= Otto Erdmann (art director) =

German art director

- Born: 16 November 1898; Berlin, German Empire
- Died: 23 January 1965 (aged 66); Berlin, Germany
- Occupation: Art director
- Years active: 1923–1961 (film)

Otto Erdmann (16 November 1898 – 23 January 1965) was a German art director. During the 1920s and 1930s he often worked alongside Hans Sohnle.

== Filmography ==
- The Weather Station (1923)
- Horrido (1924)
- The Girl from Capri (1924)
- Mother and Child (1924)
- The Stolen Professor (1924)
- The Woman in Flames (1924)
- Prater (1924)
- Joyless Street (1925)
- The Golden Calf (1925)
- Shadows of the Metropolis (1925)
- Flight Around the World (1925)
- The Third Squadron (1926)
- The Poacher (1926)
- The Great Duchess (1926)
- Tea Time in the Ackerstrasse (1926)
- Professor Imhof (1926)
- The Marriage Hotel (1926)
- Circus Romanelli (1926)
- The Pride of the Company (1926)
- The Woman Who Couldn't Say No (1927)
- The Impostor (1927)
- The Bordello in Rio (1927)
- The City of a Thousand Delights (1927)
- Hello Caesar! (1927)
- The White Slave (1927)
- Queen of the Boulevards (1927)
- Light-Hearted Isabel (1927)
- The Republic of Flappers (1928)
- The Carousel of Death (1928)
- Five Anxious Days (1928)
- The Secret Courier (1928)
- The Lady and the Chauffeur (1928)
- Pawns of Passion (1928)
- The Devious Path (1928)
- Orient (1928)
- A Girl with Temperament (1928)
- The Countess of Sand (1928)
- Who Invented Divorce? (1928)
- Scampolo (1928)
- The Story of a Little Parisian (1928)
- The Veil Dancer (1929)
- The Adjutant of the Czar (1929)
- Mascots (1929)
- Their Son (1929)
- Land Without Women (1929)
- Love in the Ring (1930)
- Alraune (1930)
- The Ring of the Empress (1930)
- Only on the Rhine (1930)
- The Great Longing (1930)
- Road to Rio (1931)
- Der Stumme von Portici (1931)
- The Yellow House of King-Fu (1931)
- The Scoundrel (1931)
- Marriage with Limited Liability (1931)
- My Wife, the Impostor (1931)
- A Night in Paradise (1932)
- The Mad Bomberg (1932)
- The Cruel Mistress (1932)
- Should We Wed Them? (1932)
- Scampolo (1932)
- The Peak Scaler (1933)
- Inge and the Millions (1933)
- Hans Westmar (1933)
- Madame Wants No Children (1933)
- The Little Crook (1933)
- Ein gewisser Herr Gran (1933)
- A Day Will Come (1934)
- The Black Whale (1934)
- Ihr größter Erfolg (1934)
- Just Once a Great Lady (1934)
- My Life for Maria Isabella (1935)
- One Too Many on Board (1935)
- Lessons in Love (1935)
- The Higher Command (1935)
- Regine (1935)
- Wer wagt - gewinnt (1935)
- Escapade (1936)
- A Hoax (1936)
- A Woman of No Importance (1936)
- Woman's Love—Woman's Suffering (1937)
- Fridericus (1937)
- Fremdenheim Filoda (1937)
- Das große Abenteuer (1938)
- Wie einst im Mai (1938)
- The Impossible Mister Pitt (1938)
- Eine Frau kommt in die Tropen (1938)
- Target in the Clouds (1939)
- Die Stimme aus dem Äther (1939)
- The Fox of Glenarvon (1940)
- You Only You (1941)
- Her Other Self (1941)
- My Life for Ireland (1941)
- A Gust of Wind (1942)
- The Big Shadow (1942)
- Symphonie eines Lebens (1943)
- Romance in a Minor Key (1943)
- Ich habe von dir geträumt (1944)
- The Concert (1944)
- Philharmonic (1944)
- Somewhere in Berlin (1946)
- Marriage in the Shadows (1947)
- No Place for Love (1947)
- The Adventures of Fridolin (1948)
- The Court Concert (1948)
- The Beaver Coat (1949)
- Don't Dream, Annette (1949)
- The Merry Wives of Windsor (1950)
- Glück muß man haben (1950)
- Story of a Young Couple (1952)
- Destinies of Women (1952)
- Die Störenfriede (1953)
- Ernst Thälmann (1954)
- Thomas Muentzer (1956)
- My Father, the Actor (1956)
- Stresemann (1957)
- Lockvogel der Nacht (1959)
- Morgen wirst du um mich weinen (1959)
- The Black Chapel (1959)
- Strafbataillon 999 (1960)
- Brandenburg Division (1960)
- The Return of Doctor Mabuse (1961)
- Blind Justice (1961)
- Auf Wiedersehen (1961)

== Bibliography ==
- Chandler, Charlotte (2011). Marlene: Marlene Dietrich, a Personal Biography. New York: Simon and Schuster. ISBN 978-1-4391-8844-6.
