= The Yellow House of Rio =

1931 film directed by Karl Grune

- Directed by: Karl Grune; Robert Péguy
- Written by: Egon Eis; Rudolph Cartier; Michael Urak
- Based on: The Yellow House of Rio by Josef M. Velter
- Starring: Charlotte Susa; Gustav Diessl; Karl Günther
- Cinematography: Werner Brandes
- Edited by: Wolfgang Loë-Bagier
- Music by: Friedrich Hollaender; Rolf Marbot; Werner Schmidt-Boelcke
- Production companies: Emelka Film; Pathé-Natan
- Distributed by: Bavaria Film; Pathé-Natan
- Release date: 17 April 1931
- Running time: 90 minutes
- Countries: France; Germany
- Languages: French; German

The Yellow House of Rio or The Yellow House of King-Fu (French: La maison jaune de Rio, German: Das gelbe Haus des King-Fu) is a 1931 French-German crime thriller film directed by Karl Grune and starring Charlotte Susa, Gustav Diessl and Karl Günther. The film was based on a novel of the same title by Josef M. Velter. It was shot at the Joinville Studios of Pathé in a co-production with Bavaria Film. The film's sets were designed by the art directors Otto Erdmann and Hans Sohnle. Separate German- and French-language versions were produced, the latter directed by Grune and Robert Péguy and featuring Renée Héribel and Charles Vanel. The German version was originally also planned to be released as The Yellow House of Rio, but to avoid confusion with another film released at the same time Road to Rio, it was retitled.

== Cast ==
=== German version ===
- Charlotte Susa as Anita
- Gustav Diessl as King-Fu / Scalpa
- Karl Günther as Smell
- Carla Gidt as Carlotta
- Willy Prager as Theaterdirektor
- Paul Graetz as Phlegmatiker
- Károly Huszár as Enthusiast
- Louis Ralph as Spießgeselle
- Jaro Fürth as Spießgeselle
- Andrews Engelmann as Spießgeselle

=== French version ===
- Charles Vanel as King-Fu / Scalpa
- Jacques Maury as Un cabotin suffisant
- Henri Valbel
- Édouard Hardoux as Le directeur du théâtre
- Jean-François Martial
- Robert Guilbert
- Andrews Engelmann
- Renée Héribel as La danseuse Anita
- Hélène Robert

== Bibliography ==
- Bock, Hans-Michael & Bergfelder, Tim. The Concise Cinegraph: Encyclopaedia of German Cinema. Berghahn Books, 2009.
- Klaus, Ulrich J. Deutsche Tonfilme: Jahrgang 1931. Klaus-Archiv, 2006.
