= The Higher Command =

1935 film

- Directed by: Gerhard Lamprecht
- Written by: Kurt Kluge; Karl Lerbs; Philipp Lothar Mayring
- Produced by: Bruno Duday
- Starring: Lil Dagover; Karl Ludwig Diehl; Heli Finkenzeller; Friedrich Kayßler
- Cinematography: Robert Baberske; Curt Courant
- Edited by: Milo Harbich
- Music by: Werner Eisbrenner; Hermann Schulenburg
- Production company: UFA
- Distributed by: UFA
- Release date: 30 December 1935
- Running time: 93 minutes
- Country: Germany
- Language: German

The Higher Command (German: Der höhere Befehl) is a 1935 German historical film directed by Gerhard Lamprecht and starring Lil Dagover, Karl Ludwig Diehl and Heli Finkenzeller. Produced and distributed by UFA, it was shot at the company's Babelsberg Studios in Potsdam. The film's sets were designed by the art directors Otto Erdmann and Hans Sohnle.

It was produced around the time of the Anglo-German Naval Agreement when the German government were still optimistic about forming an alliance with the British and saw the film as a way of recalling the historic Anglo-Prussian partnership in liberating Europe from Napoleon. The film was praised by the Minister of Propaganda Joseph Goebbels as "a national and engrossing film".

== Synopsis ==
During the Napoleonic Wars, a Prussian army officer assists a British diplomat to construct an alliance to defeat Napoleon's France.

== Cast ==
- Lil Dagover as Madame Martin
- Karl Ludwig Diehl as Rittmeister von Droste
- Heli Finkenzeller as Käte Traß
- Friedrich Kayßler as General
- Eduard von Winterstein as Major
- Aribert Wäscher as Advokat Menecke
- Hans Leibelt as Bürgermeister Stappenbeck
- Hans Mierendorff as Earl of Beckhurst
- Gertrud de Lalsky as Majorin Traß
- Karl Dannemann as Wenzel Lukas, Bursche
- Siegfried Schürenberg as Lord Beckhurst
- Günther Ballier as Premierleutnant von Bodenheim
- Johannes Bergfeldt as Mitarbeiter des Magistrats
- Gertrud Wolle as Frau Barth
- Walter Schramm-Duncker as Florian, Kutscher
- Heinz Könecke as Leutnant Eckartsberg
- Friedrich Franz Stampe as Wachtmeister Krim
- Arnim Suessenguth as Kreisgerichtsdirektor Barth
- Till Klockow as Tochter Barth
- Otti Dietze as Hotelwirtin
- Walter von Allwoerden as Vertauter des Earls
- Bertold Reissig as Mitarbeiter des Magistrats
- Robert Forsch as Apotheker Riggert
- Karl Hannemann as Holzhändler Miesling
- Leopold von Ledebur as Offizier
- Theodor Loos as Meneckes Mitarbeiter
- Werner Pledath as Kammerpräsident
- Volker von Collande as Bürger
- Claire Reigbert as Dame beim Empfang

== Bibliography ==
- Kreimeier, Klaus (1999). The Ufa Story: A History of Germany's Greatest Film Company, 1918–1945. University of California Press. ISBN 978-0-520-22069-0.
