= Gustave Preiss =

Swiss cinematographer (1881–1963)

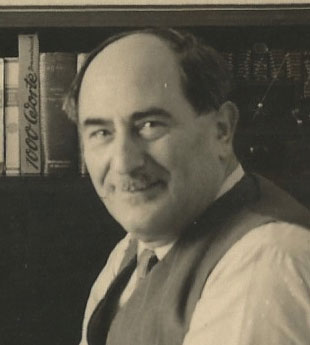
- Born: 2 July 1881; Weinfelden, Switzerland
- Died: 7 January 1963 (aged 81); Zürich, Switzerland
- Occupations: Cinematographer; film exhibitor
- Years active: 1906–1952
- Spouse: Sarine Bloch (m. 1906; div. 1917)
- Children: 3
- Father: Louis Preiss

Gustave Preiss (2 July 1881 – 7 January 1963) was a Swiss cinematographer and film exhibitor, known for his work in Weimar Germany. The son of the travelling-cinema showman Louis Praiss, he grew up in his father's fairground business, ran a cinema in Bohemia and a film company in Vienna, and from the mid-1910s became one of the most prolific camera operators of the German silent cinema before withdrawing from the industry after the transition to sound film.

== Early life and travelling cinema ==
Preiss was born in Weinfelden, in the Swiss canton of Thurgau, the son of Louis Preiss (1851–1921) — billed professionally as Louis Praiss — a showman of Prussian origin who had settled at Carouge near Geneva and who added a cinematograph to his fairground theatre from 1896. Gustave was covered, as a minor, by the federal naturalisation authorisation granted to his father on 20 April 1898; the family acquired cantonal and communal citizenship the following year, giving Gustave the Swiss place of origin of Carouge.

He learned the profession very young by taking part in his father's travelling cinema, and to broaden the still meagre supply of available films he began shooting his own material with a hand camera while in his teens. By 1904 the family establishment at Plainpalais near Geneva included a laboratory wagon in which the Praiss family exposed and developed its own films, alongside a twenty-five horsepower boiler, four projectors and eleven and a half kilometres of film stock; a procession filmed in the morning could be shown the same evening. The Tages-Anzeiger credits Gustave with coupling an Edison phonograph to his father's Lumière projector at the Swiss National Exhibition held in Geneva in 1896, producing synchronised "sound films" of five to seven minutes' duration.

From 1906 Preiss ran a travelling cinema with his elder brother Louis (1877–1908); by December of that year they were advertising in the Swiss press as "The Royal Bio & Co, Direction: L. & G. Praiss Frères", and were by then giving their shows in theatres rather than in a fairground booth. In the spring of 1907 the brothers erected a circus cinematograph seating about 1,600 at the Zelgergarten in Innsbruck under the name "The American Star"; it was struck in June after a considerable success, the proprietors donating 200 kronen to Tyrolean charities for young people and for the blind. Shortly before his death Louis had opened a Tonbildtheater at Berne, a cinema devoted to sound pictures synchronised with phonograph records; their father took over its management after the accident.

== Bohemia ==
By 1908 the Preiss family had moved to Prague. On the morning of 19 September that year Louis Preiss junior, then keeping a cinema at Berne where his father also ran one, was thrown from his motorcycle on the city's Kornhausbrücke and suffered a fatal head injury; his death was registered the following day. The family death notice listed the parents and all the surviving siblings as resident in Prague, Gustave among them with his wife and child; the Austrian trade press reported that they had travelled from there for the funeral, at which the Swiss showmen's association delivered the eulogy.

By 1910 he was the proprietor of a permanent cinema at Teplitz-Schönau, now Teplice: the Olympia Elektro-Theater, later the Olympia Licht-Spiele, at Meißnerstraße 13, with programmes changing on Wednesdays and Saturdays. He appears under that address in the Austrian trade directory of cinemas from 1910 and in the attendance list of a professional meeting held at Teplitz in October 1911, and he was still advertising as the Olympia's proprietor in 1916.

He continued to shoot films of his own in Bohemia. In May 1911 the Olympia billed his footage of the opening of the town's new Empress Elisabeth Baths as the only existing film record of the ceremony, and in May 1913 he filmed the regional exhibitors' congress at Aussig, together with a colleague from Gablonz, at the trade association's request. The Tages-Anzeiger states that he was the first newsreel cameraman granted access to the Habsburg court, and recounts his filming of Emperor Franz Joseph at a railway-station reception: finding the emperor standing too far from the lens, he called out to him from beneath the camera's black cloth to come closer, a breach of court etiquette to which the emperor responded by walking towards the camera and greeting it. The anecdote supplied the headline of the newspaper's obituary appreciation.

== Preiss-Film in Vienna ==
In 1913 Preiss and his wife established a film company in Vienna. The Preiss-Film Gesellschaft m.b.H. was entered in the commercial register on the basis of articles of association dated 26 July 1913; its stated objects were the production of cinematographic recordings, the trade in films and other cinematographic goods, and related commercial activities. The registered capital was 30,000 kronen, of which 20,000 had been paid up in cash. Preiss's wife Sarine, described in the register as a Geschäftsfrau in Wien (businesswoman in Vienna), was named sole managing director and the only person authorised to represent the company. A notice placed by the firm in November 1913 presented Preiss himself as its technical man, describing him as a first-rank specialist with eighteen years in cinematography and at the disposal of the company's customers in the event of technical or mechanical breakdowns.

Trading from successive premises in the Neubaugasse, in Vienna's Neubau district, the firm handled films from Edison, Vitagraph, Messter, Deutsche Bioscop, Éclair, Nordisk and Pasquali, and held monopoly rights to a number of titles; its rights to Stellan Rye's Der Student von Prag covered Austria with the exception of Vienna, Bohemia, Moravia and Silesia. Its reach extended to the eastern crownlands: in October 1913 it appointed the Kinograph Film-Leihanstalt of Lemberg as its agent for Galicia and Bukovina, with authority to conclude rental contracts in its name and delivery of prints from Vienna, and invited the trade to a press screening of Der Student von Prag at the Kino Kopernik in Lemberg on 23 October. Among the releases it presented in Vienna was Alt-Heidelberg, du feine…, shown at the Filmschau in March 1914. A death notice placed by the company in November 1914 for an employee who had died of wounds received at the front was signed jointly by Gustav and Sarine Preiß. The company was dissolved by resolution of the general meeting on 6 November 1915 and went into liquidation, with Sarine Preiss acting as liquidator.

== Berlin ==
Preiss's first credits as a feature cameraman in Germany date from 1916, while he was still proprietor of the Olympia at Teplitz. He settled in Berlin, where, according to the Tages-Anzeiger, the two decades from 1912 to 1932 formed the main part of his career. He became one of the busiest camera operators of the German silent period, working with directors including Harry Piel, Manfred Noa, Carl Froelich, Georg Jacoby, Léonce Perret, Carmine Gallone and Augusto Genina, and photographing performers such as Henny Porten, Lya de Putti, Liane Haid, Paul Wegener, Hans Albers, Charles Vanel, Olga Chekhova, Walter Slezak, Grete Mosheim, Adele Sandrock, Rudolf Forster, Albert Bassermann, Karel Lamač, William Dieterle, Willy Fritsch and Willy Forst.

He shot frequently outside Germany, in Paris and in North Africa: Die weiße Sklavin was photographed at Biskra in 1926 with Liane Haid and Charles Vanel. He had a particular reputation for location work, and made his own reflector boards — squares of roughly 1.5 metres faced with gold and silver paper — to redirect sunlight on exterior shoots. Kay Weniger characterises Preiss as a dependable professional whose work rarely showed artistic ambition.

His last screen credits date from 1930, and he left the German film industry after the coming of sound, returning to Switzerland; the Tages-Anzeiger wrote that he had turned his back on the Third Reich.

== Return to Switzerland ==
From 1932 to 1952 Preiss operated his own film laboratory in Zürich, much of whose equipment he designed and built himself. Distributors and exhibitors brought him damaged or defective prints at any hour of the day or night, and he kept no fixed working hours. Having earned substantial fees in Berlin, he lived modestly in Zürich, having lost money in the failure of a Swiss bank and in the collapse of Ivar Kreuger's match empire.

After retiring he remained a habitual cinema-goer, attending a different house almost every evening; Zürich exhibitors kept seats for him even at sold-out premieres. He died at his home on the Bergstrasse in Zürich on 7 January 1963, aged 81, and was buried at the Rehalp cemetery. The youngest of his three daughters had died at Geneva in January 1953; the two elder survived him.

== Personal life ==
On 18 January 1906 Preiss married Sarine Bloch (1883–1939) in Biel/Bienne, Switzerland, where she ran her own ladies' hairdressing and manicure salon at 28 Rue Centrale. The couple had three daughters, the eldest born before September 1908. The marriage was dissolved by a decree of the Landgericht I in Berlin on 20 October 1917. Sarine Preiss remained in Vienna, where on 22 February 1918 she married the film distributor and later playwright Ernst Robert Friese-Skuhra (1886–1949); she died there in 1939.

== Selected filmography ==
Year	Original title	English title	Notes
1916	Die Töchter des Eichmeisters		
1916	Theophrastus Paracelsus		
1917	Wie Bubi Detektiv wurde		
1917	Fräulein Schwindelmeier		
1919	Die siebente Großmacht		
1919	Samson		
1919	Die Geächteten	The Outcasts / Ritual Murder	
1919	Das Ende vom Liede		
1920	Aus der Werkstatt einer Tänzerin		
1920	Die Luftpiraten	The Air Pirates	
1920	Die Geheimnisse des Zirkus Barré		
1920	Das Fest der schwarzen Tulpe	The Black Tulip Festival	
1920	Die Benefiz-Vorstellung der vier Teufel		
1920	Die entfesselte Menschheit	Humanity Unleashed	
1920	Die Todeskarawane		
1921	Ehrenschuld	A Debt of Honour	
1921	Die Amazone	The Amazon	
1921	Die Geschwister Barelli		
1921	Perlen bedeuten Tränen		
1922	Das goldene Netz	The Golden Net	
1922	Zwischen Tag und Traum		
1922	Nathan der Weise	Nathan the Wise	
1922		The Unwritten Law	
1923	Koenigsmark		
1924	Helena	Helena	
1924	Das Mädel von Capri	The Girl from Capri	
1924	Prater	Prater	
1924	Mutter und Kind	Mother and Child	
1925	Das goldene Kalb	The Golden Calf	
1925	Eine Minute vor Zwölf	One Minute to Twelve	
1926	Der Wilderer	The Poacher	
1926	Der Mann aus dem Jenseits		
1926	Der dumme August des Zirkus Romanelli	Circus Romanelli	
1926	Junges Blut	Young Blood	
1926	Warum sich scheiden lassen?	Why Get a Divorce?	
1926	Das graue Haus		
1926	Die drei Mannequins	The Three Mannequins	
1926	Das Panzergewölbe	The Armoured Vault	
1927	Die weiße Sklavin	The White Slave	Shot on location at Biskra, Algeria, in 1926
1927	Wenn der junge Wein blüht	When the Young Wine Blossoms	
1927	Da hält die Welt den Atem an		
1927	Meine Tante – deine Tante	My Aunt, Your Aunt	
1927	Die Stadt der tausend Freuden	The City of a Thousand Delights	
1927	Der falsche Prinz	The False Prince	
1928	Violantha	Violantha	
1928	Lotte	Lotte	
1928	Marys großes Geheimnis		
1928	Liebe und Diebe		
1928	Zuflucht		
1928	Fünf bange Tage	Five Anxious Days	
1928	Liebe im Kuhstall	Love in the Cowshed	
1929	Die Todesfahrt im Weltrekord	Death Drive for the World Record	
1929	Die Frau, die jeder liebt, bist Du!	The Woman Everyone Loves Is You	
1929	Liebfraumilch	German Wine	
1929	Rosen blühen auf dem Heidegrab	Roses Bloom on the Moorland	
1929	Die Garde-Diva		
1930	Der Liebesmarkt	The Love Market	
1930	Ruhiges Heim mit Küchenbenutzung	Rooms to Let	
1930	Stürmisch die Nacht		
