= Der singende Tor =

- Directed by: Johannes Meyer
- Written by: L.A.C. Müller
- Produced by: Herbert Engelsing; Alberto Giacalone
- Starring: Beniamino Gigli; Kirsten Heiberg; Hilde Körber
- Cinematography: Werner Brandes
- Edited by: Max Michel
- Music by: Franco Casavola; Franz Grothe; Riccardo Zandonai
- Production company: Itala Film
- Distributed by: Tobis Film
- Release date: 22 December 1939
- Running time: 78 minutes
- Countries: Germany; Italy
- Language: German

Der singende Tor (literal English translation: The Singing Fool) is a 1939 German-Italian musical film directed by Johannes Meyer and starring Beniamino Gigli, Kirsten Heiberg, and Hilde Körber. It was a co-production made at Cinecittà Studios in Rome with a German director and a cast of mixed nationalities. The film's sets were designed by the art director Otto Guelstorff. A separate Italian version called Casa lontana was also made.

== Cast ==
- Beniamino Gigli as Carlo Franchetti
- Kirsten Heiberg as Sylvia Franchetti
- Hilde Körber as Peggy Kennedy
- Hans Olden as James Kennedy
- Elsa Wagner as Diana
- Werner Fuetterer as Antonio
- Walter Steinbeck as Franchettis Manager
- Rudolf Platte as Sekretär
- Friedrich Kayßler as Judge
- Franz Schafheitlin as Prosecutor
- Ernst Fritz Fürbringer as Defense lawyer
- Rudolf Essek as Korrepetitor Franchettis
- Else Boy as Freundin Sylvias
- Oretta Fiume as Freundin Sylvias
- Charlotte Schellhorn as Bartoli - Witness
- Angelo Ferrari as Direktor der Oper in Neapel

== Bibliography ==
- Parish, Robert. Film Actors Guide. Scarecrow Press, 1977.
