= A Night in Paradise (1932 film) =

1932 film

- Directed by: Carl Lamac
- Written by: Hans Bergmann; Adolf Lantz; Walter Schlee; Walter Wassermann; Joe Wilkin
- Starring: Anny Ondra; Hermann Thimig; Ralph Arthur Roberts
- Cinematography: Otto Heller
- Edited by: Ella Ensink
- Music by: Marc Roland
- Production companies: Lothar Stark-Film; Ondra-Lamac-Film
- Distributed by: Messtro-Film
- Release date: 5 March 1932
- Running time: 92 minutes
- Country: Germany
- Language: German

A Night in Paradise (German: Eine Nacht im Paradies) is a 1932 German musical film directed by Carl Lamac and starring Anny Ondra, Hermann Thimig and Ralph Arthur Roberts. A separate French-language version was also produced with the title Une nuit au paradis directed by Lamac and Pierre Billon. It was shot at the EFA Studios in Berlin. The film's art direction was by Otto Erdmann and Hans Sohnle.

== Cast ==
- Anny Ondra as Monika Böhnicke
- Hermann Thimig as Gerd Brenken
- Ralph Arthur Roberts as Generaldirektor Walldorf
- Grete Natzler as Seine Frau
- Oscar Sabo as Böhnicke, Nachtportier
- Margarete Kupfer as Seine Frau
- Erna Morena as Inhaberin des Modesalons 'Marguerite'
- Henry Bender as Direktor d. Wohnungskunst A.G.
- Lewis Ruth Band as Orchester

== Bibliography ==
- Waldman, Harry (2008). Nazi Films in America, 1933–1942. McFarland. ISBN 978-0-7864-3861-7.
- Klaus, Ulrich J. Deutsche Tonfilme: Jahrgang 1932. Klaus-Archiv, 1988.
