= Madame Wants No Children =

Madame Wants No Children may refer to:

- Madame Wants No Children (1926 film), a German silent drama film
- Madame Wants No Children (1933 film), an Austrian-German comedy film
