= Five Anxious Days =

1928 film

- Directed by: Gennaro Righelli
- Written by: Léo Joannon
- Produced by: Ernst Franzos
- Starring: Maria Jacobini; Anton Pointner; Nathalie Lissenko
- Cinematography: Akos Farkas; Gustave Preiss
- Production company: Lothar Stark-Film
- Distributed by: Deutsche Lichtspiel-Syndikat
- Release date: December 1928
- Running time: 107 minutes
- Country: Germany
- Languages: Silent; German intertitles

Five Anxious Days (German: Fünf bange Tage) is a 1928 German silent drama film directed by Gennaro Righelli and starring Maria Jacobini, Anton Pointner and Nathalie Lissenko. The film's sets were designed by the art directors Otto Erdmann and Hans Sohnle.

== Cast ==
- Maria Jacobini as Maria Voikoff
- Anton Pointner as Ihr Mann Wladimir Voikoff
- Nathalie Lissenko as Seine Mutter
- Gabriel Gabrio as General Vorileff
- Fritz Alberti as Fürst Kierowski
- Harry Hardt as Sein Adjutant
- Angelo Ferrari as Ivan Petrovich

== Bibliography ==
- James Robert Parish. Film Actors Guide. Scarecrow Press, 1977.
