= The Woman in Flames =

1924 film

- German: Die Frau im Feuer
- Directed by: Carl Boese
- Written by: Ernst B. Fey; Georg Hirschfeld (novel); Margarete-Maria Langen
- Starring: Asta Nielsen; Alfred Abel; Gregori Chmara
- Cinematography: Hans Karl Gottschalk; Max Grix
- Music by: Bruno Schulz
- Production company: Bavaria Film
- Distributed by: Bavaria Film
- Release date: 23 December 1924
- Country: Germany
- Languages: Silent; German intertitles

The Woman in Flames (German: Die Frau im Feuer) is a 1924 German silent thriller film directed by Carl Boese and starring Asta Nielsen, Alfred Abel, and Gregori Chmara.

It was shot at the Bavaria Studios in Munich. The film's sets were designed by the art director Hans Sohnle and Otto Erdmann. The film was released on 23 December 1924.

== Cast ==
- Asta Nielsen as Josefine
- Alfred Abel as Hans Fennhofer
- Gregori Chmara as Stanislaus, Diener
- Helene von Bolváry as Ein Straßenmädchen
- Lia Eibenschütz as Lisa
- Valeska Goldberger as Dame
- Erwin Fichtner as Fennhofers Chauffeur
- Henry Bender as Bellmann, Regisseur
