= Meier Helmbrecht (play) =

- Written by: Eugen Ortner
- Original language: German
- Genre: Tragedy

Premiere
- Date premiered: 1928
- Place premiered: Munich Kammerspiele

Meier Helmbrecht is a 1928 play by the German writer Eugen Ortner. A historical tragedy set around 1250, it was first staged at the Munich Kammerspiele. It was subsequently staged less successfully at the Staatliches Schauspielhaus in Berlin with a cast including Veit Harlan and Friedrich Kayßler.

This 1928 play draws from the ca. 1250-1280 satirical poem of the same name by the Bavarian-Austrian author Wernher der Gartenaere.

== Bibliography ==
- Noack, Frank. Veit Harlan: The Life and Work of a Nazi Filmmaker. University Press of Kentucky, 2016.
