= Werner Brandes =

German cinematographer

- Born: 10 July 1889; Brunswick; German Empire
- Died: 30 September 1968 (aged 79); Los Angeles, California; United States
- Occupation: cinematographer
- Years active: 1913 – 1957

Werner Brandes (10 July 1889 in Braunschweig – 30 September 1968) was a German cinematographer. Brandes moved to Britain in the late 1920s to work on several prestige films for British International Pictures.

== Selected filmography ==
- Der Hund von Baskerville (1914)
- The Guilt of Lavinia Morland (1920)
- The Legend of Holy Simplicity (1920)
- The Golden Bullet (1921)
- Sins of Yesterday (1922)
- The Green Manuela (1923)
- The Island of Tears (1923)
- A Woman, an Animal, a Diamond (1923)
- Man Against Man (1924)
- The Humble Man and the Chanteuse (1925)
- Flight Around the World (1925)
- A Waltz Dream (1925)
- The Man in the Fire (1926)
- His Toughest Case (1926)
- The Woman in the Cupboard (1927)
- His Late Excellency (1927)
- Moulin Rouge (1928)
- Tesha (1928)
- Piccadilly (1929)
- The League of Three (1929)
- The Informer (1929)
- The W Plan (1930)
- Waltz of Love (1930)
- The Blonde Nightingale (1930)
- The Shot in the Sound Film Studio (1930)
- Love's Carnival (1930)
- La maison jaune de Rio (1931)
- The Yellow House of Rio (1931)
- The Little Escapade (1931)
- Express 13 (1931)
- When Love Sets the Fashion (1932)
- Spoiling the Game (1932)
- Frederica (1933)
- The Country Schoolmaster (1933)
- The Star of Valencia (1933)
- A Door Opens (1933)
- Tales from the Vienna Woods (1934)
- Just Once a Great Lady (1934)
- A Day Will Come (1934)
- Song of Farewell (1934)
- Farewell Waltz (1934)
- The World's in Love (1935)
- Stradivarius (1935)
- Stradivari (1935)
- Regine (1935)
- Winter Night's Dream (1935)
- The Emperor's Candlesticks (1936)
- The Castle in Flanders (1936)
- Where the Lark Sings (1936)
- Lumpaci the Vagabond (1936)
- The Irresistible Man (1937)
- The Ruler (1937)
- Mirror of Life (1938)
- Der singende Tor (1939)
- Between River and Steppe (1939)
- Flower of the Tisza (1939)
- Dreams That Money Can Buy (1947)

== Bibliography ==
- Bergfelder, Tim & Cargnelli, Christian. Destination London: German-speaking emigrés and British cinema, 1925–1950. Berghahn Books, 2008.
