= A Hoax =

1936 film

- Directed by: E. W. Emo
- Written by: Hans Fritz Köllner; Hanns Sassmann
- Starring: Paul Hörbiger; Trude Marlen; Hans Moser
- Cinematography: Bruno Mondi
- Edited by: Wolfgang Wehrum
- Music by: Viktor Corzilius
- Production company: Algefa Film
- Distributed by: Europa Film
- Release date: 4 September 1936
- Country: Germany
- Language: German

A Hoax (German: Schabernack) is a 1936 German comedy film directed by E. W. Emo and starring Paul Hörbiger, Trude Marlen, and Hans Moser. It was shot at the National Studios in Berlin. The film's sets were designed by Otto Erdmann and Hans Sohnle.

== Synopsis ==
A hotel is financially struggling until the nearby lunatic asylum is forced to close following a fire and all the patients are relocated to the hotel. Confusion arises when a newly arrived hotel guest is mistaken for a lunatic.

== Main cast ==
- Paul Hörbiger as Peter Burgstaller, Oberkellner
- Trude Marlen as Eva Hügler, Inhaberin Hotel 'Kronprinz'
- Hans Moser as Wandl, Hausknecht 'Hotel Kronprinz'
- Heinz Salfner as Mr. Vanderbilt
- Max Gülstorff as Julius Hügler sen., Präsident Hügler AG.
- Hans Richter as Manz, Liftboy 'Hotel Kronprinz'
- Karl Ludwig Schreiber as Fred Bruckmann
- Paul Henckels as Professor Marius, Besitzer Sanatorium 'Seelenruhe'
- Erika von Schaper
- Hans Rudolf Waldburg
- Josef Reithofer
- Egon Brosig

== Bibliography ==
- Bock, Hans-Michael; Bergfelder, Tim, eds. (2009). The Concise Cinegraph: Encyclopaedia of German Cinema. New York: Berghahn Books. ISBN 978-1-57181-655-9.
- Klaus, Ulrich J. Deutsche Tonfilme: Jahrgang 1936. Klaus-Archiv, 1988.
