= Madame Wants No Children (1933 film) =

1933 film directed by Hans Steinhoff

- German: Madame wünscht keine Kinder
- Directed by: Hans Steinhoff
- Written by: Max Kolpé; Fritz Rotter; Billy Wilder
- Based on: Madame Wants No Children by Clément Vautel
- Produced by: Anatol Potock
- Starring: Liane Haid; Georg Alexander; Lucie Mannheim
- Cinematography: Hans Androschin; Willy Goldberger
- Edited by: Ella Ensink
- Music by: Walter Jurmann; Bronislau Kaper; Hans J. Salter
- Production companies: Lothar Stark-Film; Vandor Film
- Distributed by: Europa-Filmverleih
- Release date: 16 January 1933
- Running time: 86 minutes
- Countries: Austria; Germany
- Language: German

Madame Wants No Children (German: Madame wünscht keine Kinder) is a 1933 Austrian-German comedy film directed by Hans Steinhoff and starring Liane Haid, Georg Alexander and Lucie Mannheim. It is a remake of the 1926 silent film Madame Wants No Children. It was shot at the Sievering Studios in Vienna. The film's sets were designed by the art directors Otto Erdmann, Hans Sohnle and Emil Stepanek.

== Cast ==
- Liane Haid as Madelaine Wengert
- Georg Alexander as Dr. Felix Rainer
- Lucie Mannheim as Luise
- Otto Wallburg as Herr Balsam
- Erika Glässner as Frau Wengert
- Willy Stettner as Adolf
- Hans Moser as Schlafwagenschaffner
