= Paul Henckels =

German actor

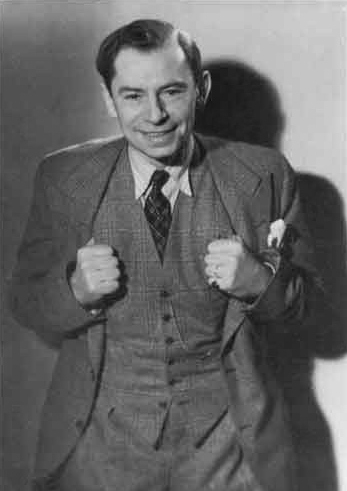
- Born: 9 September 1885; Hürth, German Empire
- Died: 27 May 1967 (aged 81); Kettwig, West Germany
- Occupation: Actor
- Years active: 1900s–1965
- Spouse: Thea Grodtczinsky

Paul Henckels (9 September 1885 – 27 May 1967) was a German film and stage actor. He appeared in more than 230 films between 1921 and 1965. Paul Henckels had started his acting career on the stage in the 1900s.

He was well known for his eccentric, colourful roles and his trademark Rhineland accent. Among his most popular roles were the school teacher Professor Bömmel in Die Feuerzangenbowle (1944) and the veterinarian Dr. Pudlich in the "Immenhof film series" during the 1950s. He was also notable as a stage actor and appeared at the Schauspielhaus Berlin for many years. His most popular stage role was Wibbel the Tailor, which he played more than 1000 times.

Henckel's father was Jewish, and he was thus a "half-Jew" by the rules of the Nazis. As a rare exception, Henckels was nonetheless allowed to work during the Third Reich. He apparently owed this exception to the intervention of his friend Gustaf Gründgens and to his continuing popularity as a character actor. His wife, Thea Grodtczinsky, was Jewish. She could not work during the Third Reich, but her connections and Henckel's apparently prevented her from being deported to concentration camps.

== Selected filmography ==
- The Secret of Brinkenhof (1923)
- Dudu, a Human Destiny (1924)
- State Attorney Jordan (1926)
- Professor Imhof (1926)
- The House of Lies (1926)
- The Trial of Donald Westhof (1927)
- Assassination (1927)
- Sex in Chains (1928)
- The Last Night (1928)
- Der Ladenprinz (1928)
- Ariadne in Hoppegarten (1928)
- The Insurmountable (1928)
- The Beaver Coat (1928)
- At Ruedesheimer Castle There Is a Lime Tree (1928)
- Thérèse Raquin (1928)
- Napoleon at Saint Helena (1929)
- Hungarian Nights (1929)
- A Mother's Love (1929)
- Diary of a Coquette (1929)
- German Wine (1929)
- Foolish Happiness (1929)
- The Love of the Brothers Rott (1929)
- Dawn (1929)
- Perjury (1929)
- Spring Awakening (1929)
- Scandalous Eva (1930)
- The Woman Without Nerves (1930)
- The Stolen Face (1930)
- Flachsmann the Educator (1930)
- Dolly Gets Ahead (1930)
- Pension Schöller (1930)
- Dreyfus (1930)
- The Immortal Vagabond (1930)
- The Great Longing (1930)
- The Tender Relatives (1930)
- Burglars (1930)
- The Last Company (1930)
- Cyanide (1930)
- Her Majesty the Barmaid (1931)
- Cadets (1931)
- The True Jacob (1931)
- Gloria (1931)
- My Leopold (1931)
- The Unfaithful Eckehart (1931)
- The Scoundrel (1931)
- Wibbel the Tailor (1931)
- The Ringer (1932)
- The Pride of Company Three (1932)
- Secret of the Blue Room (1932)
- The Testament of Cornelius Gulden (1932)
- No Money Needed (1932)
- The Mad Bomberg (1932)
- Rasputin, Demon with Women (1932)
- Things Are Getting Better Already (1932)
- This One or None (1932)
- Bon Voyage (1933)
- The Country Schoolmaster (1933)
- Typhoon (1933)
- Girls of Today (1933)
- Dream of the Rhine (1933)
- The Hunter from Kurpfalz (1933)
- The Roberts Case (1933)
- Little Man, What Now? (1933)
- Happy Days in Aranjuez (1933)
- Ripening Youth (1933)
- Charley's Aunt (1934)
- Farewell Waltz (1934)
- Between Two Hearts (1934)
- A Woman With Power of Attorney (1934)
- Holiday From Myself (1934)
- The Legacy of Pretoria (1934)
- The Grand Duke's Finances (1934)
- The Big Chance (1934)
- The Prodigal Son (1934)
- An Ideal Husband (1935)
- The Old and the Young King (1935)
- Lessons in Love (1935)
- Dreams of Love (1935)
- Every Day Isn't Sunday (1935)
- Peter, Paul and Nanette (1935)
- Victoria in Dover (1936)
- Paul and Pauline (1936)
- The Call of the Jungle (1936)
- The Night With the Emperor (1936)
- A Woman of No Importance (1936)
- A Hoax (1936)
- The Impossible Woman (1936)
- Carousel (1937)
- Capers (1937)
- The Glass Ball (1937)
- The Muzzle (1938)
- Napoleon Is to Blame for Everything (1938)
- The Immortal Heart (1939)
- Twelve Minutes After Midnight (1939)
- The Leghorn Hat (1939)
- Her Private Secretary (1940)
- Mistress Moon (1941)
- The Night in Venice (1942)
- The Great King (1942)
- Love Me (1942)
- Das Grosse Spiel (1942)
- Vienna Blood (1942)
- Two in a Big City (1942)
- Between Heaven and Earth (1942)
- Melody of a Great City (1943)
- An Old Heart Becomes Young Again (1943)
- The Bath in the Barn (1943)
- Life Calls (1944)
- Die Feuerzangenbowle (1944)
- Wozzeck (1947)
- Thank You, I'm Fine (1948)
- An Everyday Story (1948)
- The Court Concert (1948)
- Search for Majora (1949)
- I'll Never Forget That Night (1949)
- Good Fortune in Ohio (1950)
- Harbour Melody (1950)
- One Night's Intoxication (1951)
- Holiday From Myself (1952)
- No Greater Love (1952)
- Once on the Rhine (1952)
- Three Days of Fear (1952)
- Klettermaxe (1952)
- Pension Schöller (1952)
- Dutch Girl (1953)
- Prosecutor Corda (1953)
- The Dancing Heart (1953)
- The Stronger Woman (1953)
- Fanfare of Marriage (1953)
- Columbus Discovers Kraehwinkel (1954)
- The Little Czar (1954)
- Ball of Nations (1954)
- Clivia (1954)
- Reaching for the Stars (1955)
- The Immenhof Girls (1955)
- Three Girls from the Rhine (1955)
- The Spanish Fly (1955)
- You Can No Longer Remain Silent (1955)
- Mamitschka (1955)
- Hochzeit auf Immenhof (1956)
- A Thousand Melodies (1956)
- Three Birch Trees on the Heath (1956)
- The Tour Guide of Lisbon (1956)
- Fruit in the Neighbour's Garden (1956)
- Confessions of Felix Krull (1957)
- A Piece of Heaven (1957)
- Ferien auf Immenhof (1957)
- The Mad Bomberg (1957)
- Via Mala (1961)
