= The Impossible Mister Pitt =

1938 film directed by Harry Piel

- Directed by: Harry Piel
- Written by: Harald Bratt; Reinhold Meißner; Georg Mühlen-Schulte; Harry Piel
- Based on: The Impossible Mister Pitt by Georg Mühlen-Schulte
- Produced by: Hans Conradi; Harry Piel
- Starring: Harry Piel; Willi Schur; Leopold von Ledebur; Hilde Weissner
- Cinematography: Karl Puth; Fritz von Friedl
- Edited by: Carl Otto Bartning
- Music by: Ernst Leenen
- Production companies: Terra Film; Ariel-Film
- Distributed by: Terra Film
- Release date: 16 April 1938
- Running time: 92 minutes
- Country: Germany
- Language: German

The Impossible Mister Pitt (German: Der unmögliche Herr Pitt) is a 1938 German adventure crime film directed by and starring Harry Piel. It also features Willi Schur, Leopold von Ledebur and Hilde Weissner. It was shot at the Babelsberg Studios in Berlin and on location off the coast of Split in Croatia. The film's sets were designed by the art directors Otto Erdmann and Hans Sohnle. It was based on the novel of the same title by Georg Mühlen-Schulte who also worked on the screenplay.

== Synopsis ==
Tom and Tim escape from a Tunisian prison where they were doing hard labour after being arrested following a brawl and not having correct identity documents. They board a luxury yacht and encounter Lucienne and her father Thomas Cay. Tom impersonates a man called Pitt who is engaged to Lucienne and she, taking a liking to him, plays along. He soon uncovers a plot to sabotage the yacht.

== Cast ==
- Harry Piel as Tom
- Willi Schur as Tim
- Leopold von Ledebur as Thomas Cay
- Hilde Weissner as Lucienne, seine Tochter
- Hans Junkermann as Lord Bonnycastle
- Julia Serda as Lady Jane
- Hans Stiebner as Anatol Mabub
- Werner Scharf as José Galvez
- Hans Hermann Schaufuß as René Mouche
- Ursula Grabley as Amélie, seine Tochter
- Leonie Duval as Fauchette
- Hans Zesch-Ballot as Picard, Polizeiinspektor
- Olaf Bach as Nicole, Matrose
- Fritz Klaudius as Ponpon, Matrose
- Louis Brody as Hannibal, Matrose
- Klaus Pohl as Parker, Matrose
- Victor Bell as Schwarzer Kunde beim Barbier
- Charly Berger as Funker des Polizeikutters
- Horst Birr as Schiffsjunge
- Peter Busse as Italienischer Wirt
- Gerhard Dammann as Rechtsanwalt
- Jac Diehl as Kellner
- Max Diekmann as Raufender Matrose
- Erich Dunskus as Kapitän Hook
- Angelo Ferrari as Schnellrichter
- Cläre Gilb as Mädchen im Gefängnis
- Fred Goebel as Polizist
- Jochen Hauer as Duval, Erster Offizier
- Mohamed Husen as Kameltreiber
- Alfred Karen as Mann beim Notar
- Ernst Albert Schaach as Sekretär des Untersuchungsrichters
- Paul Schneider-Duncker as Sekretär bei Cay
- Georg H. Schnell as Chiron, Senator
- F.W. Schröder-Schrom as Ricaut, Notar
- Hasso Sherief-Osmann as Schwarzer Diener des Notars
- Otto Stoeckel as Untersuchungsrichter
- Aruth Wartan as Arabi
- Sergei Woischeff as Kapitän des Polizeikutters

== Bibliography ==
- Giesen, Rolf. The Nosferatu Story: The Seminal Horror Film, Its Predecessors and Its Enduring Legacy. McFarland, 2019.
- Goble, Alan. The Complete Index to Literary Sources in Film. Walter de Gruyter, 1999.
- Noack, Frank. Veit Harlan: The Life and Work of a Nazi Filmmaker. University Press of Kentucky, 2016.
- Rentschler, Eric. The Ministry of Illusion: Nazi Cinema and Its Afterlife. Harvard University Press, 1996.
