= The City of a Thousand Delights =

1927 film directed by Carmine Gallone

- German film poster
- German: Die Stadt der tausend Freuden
- Directed by: Carmine Gallone
- Based on: The City of Pleasure by Arnold Bennett
- Produced by: Ernst Franzos; Lothar Stark
- Starring: Paul Richter; Adele Sandrock; Langhorn Burton
- Cinematography: Gustave Preiss
- Music by: Hans May
- Production company: Lothar Stark-Film
- Distributed by: Lothar Stark-Film
- Release date: 29 December 1927
- Running time: 89 minutes
- Country: Germany
- Languages: Silent; German intertitles

The City of a Thousand Delights (German: Die Stadt der tausend Freuden) is a 1927 German silent drama film directed by Carmine Gallone and starring Paul Richter, Adele Sandrock and Langhorn Burton. It is based on the 1907 novel The City of Pleasure by the British writer Arnold Bennett. The film's sets were designed by the art directors Otto Erdmann and Hans Sohnle.

== Cast ==
- Paul Richter as Jack Ilam
- Adele Sandrock as Seine Mutter
- Langhorn Burton as Carlos Carpentaria
- Claire Rommer as Juliette, their sister
- Renée Héribel as Pauline, Jack Ilam's cousin
- Frances Cuyler as Rosie, Jack Ilam's cousin
- Gaston Modot as Jetsam
