= The Carousel of Death =

1928 film

- Directed by: Heinz Paul
- Written by: Hella Moja
- Produced by: Lothar Stark
- Starring: Claire Rommer; Anton Pointner; Jean Murat
- Cinematography: Willy Hameister
- Music by: Bernard Homola
- Production company: Lothar Stark-Film
- Release date: 3 April 1928
- Country: Germany
- Languages: Silent; German intertitles

The Carousel of Death (German: Das Karussell des Todes) is a 1928 German silent film directed by Heinz Paul and starring Claire Rommer, Anton Pointner and Jean Murat.

The film's art direction was by Otto Erdmann and Hans Sohnle.

== Cast ==
- Claire Rommer
- Anton Pointner
- Jean Murat
- Angelo Ferrari
- Erich Kaiser-Titz

== Bibliography ==
- Alfred Krautz. International directory of cinematographers, set- and costume designers in film, Volume 4. Saur, 1984.
