= Horrido =

1924 film

- Directed by: Johannes Meyer
- Written by: Maximilian Böttcher
- Starring: Robert Leffler; Rudolf Forster; Lia Eibenschütz
- Cinematography: Otto Tober
- Production company: Europäische Lichtbild
- Distributed by: UFA
- Release date: 17 April 1924
- Running time: 86 minutes
- Country: Germany
- Languages: Silent; German intertitles

Horrido is a 1924 German silent film directed by Johannes Meyer and starring Robert Leffler, Rudolf Forster and Lia Eibenschütz.

The film's art direction was by Otto Erdmann and Hans Sohnle.

== Cast ==
- Robert Leffler
- Rudolf Forster
- Lia Eibenschütz
- Heinrich Schroth
- Charlotte Ander
- Viktor Schwannecke
- Henry Bender
- Carl Zickner
- Georg Baselt
- Paul Rehkopf
- Jenny Nansen
- Hermann Leffler
