= Friedrich Kayssler =

German actor (1874–1945)

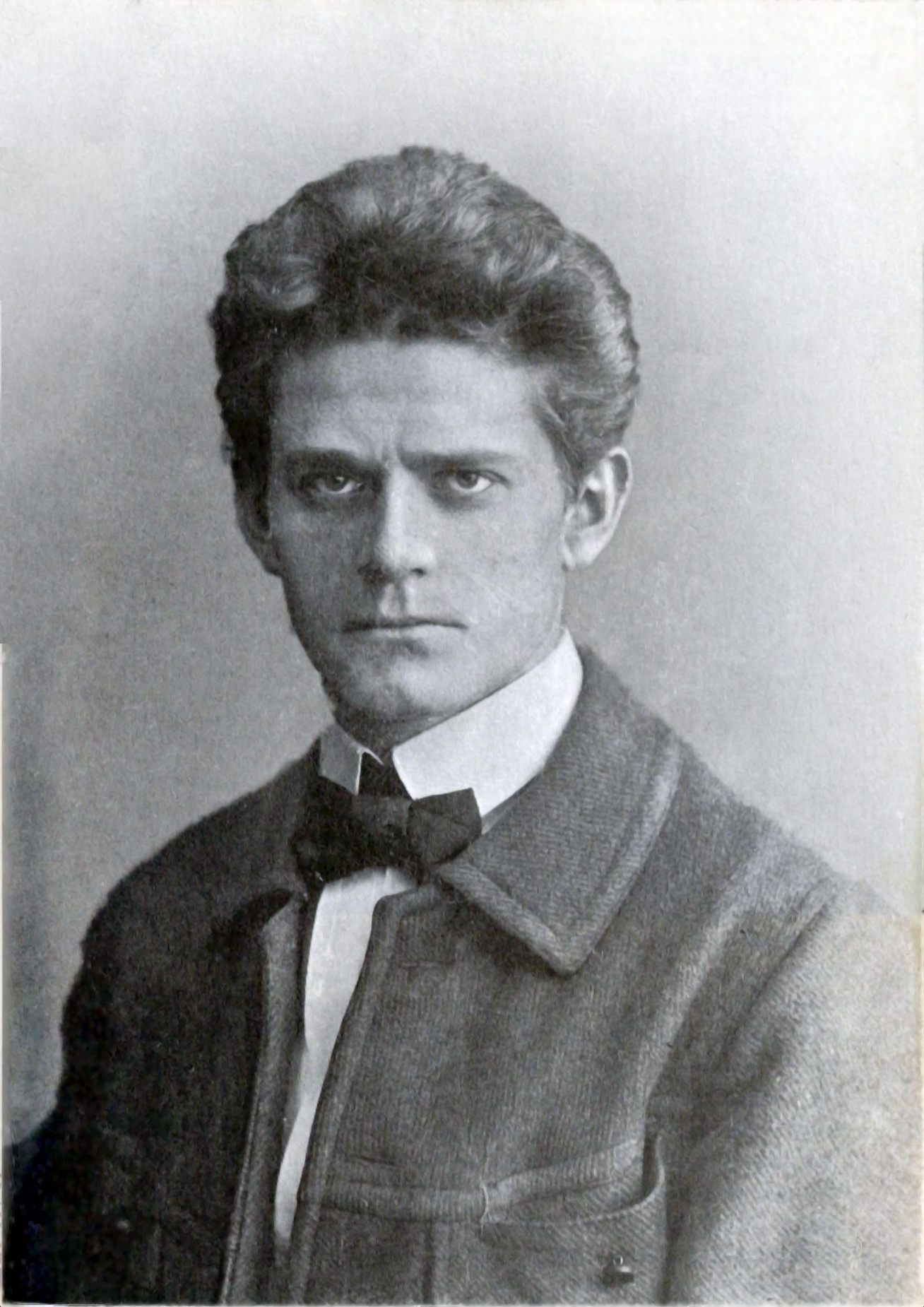
- Kayssler in 1898
- Born: Friedrich Martin Adalbert Kayssler; 7 April 1874; Neurode, German Empire
- Died: 30 April 1945 (aged 71); Kleinmachnow, Nazi Germany
- Occupation: Actor
- Years active: 1913–1945

Friedrich Martin Adalbert Kayssler, also spelled Kayßler (7 April 1874 – 30 April 1945), was a German theatre and film actor. He appeared in 56 films between 1913 and 1945.

== Biography ==
Kayssler was born in Neurode in the Silesia Province of Prussia (now Nowa Ruda in Lower Silesian Voivodeship, Poland). He attended the gymnasium in Breslau (Wrocław), where he became a close friend of Christian Morgenstern and Fritz Beblo. Graduating in 1893, Kayssler studied philosophy at the University of Breslau and the Ludwig-Maximilians-Universität München, and he began his theatre career at the Deutsches Theater in Berlin under manager Otto Brahm, later working at municipal theatres in Görlitz and Halle (Saale).

At the Deutsches Theater, Kayssler had made friends with director Max Reinhardt, whose Schall und Rauch Kabarett ensemble in Berlin he joined in 1901. He followed Reinhardt, when he became manager of the Deutsches Theater in 1905, where Kayssler performed in Kleist's The Prince of Homburg, Goethe's Faust and Ibsen's Peer Gynt. He also succeeded Reinhardt as manager of the Berlin Volksbühne from 1918 until 1923. He first appeared as a film actor in the silent movie Welche sterben, wenn sie lieben in 1913 and wrote several poems and dramas. In 1934, he starred alongside Veit Harlan in the Berlin premiere of Eugen Ortner's Meier Helmbrecht at the Staatliches Schauspielhaus .

In March 1944, his son Christian, who was also a popular film actor, was killed in an Allied bombing raid. Kayssler was named as one of the Third Reich's most important artists in the Gottbegnadeten list of September 1944. During the Battle of Berlin, Kayssler was killed by Red Army troops at his house in the suburb of Kleinmachnow, when he tried to protect his wife. Ernst Lemmer claimed in his memoirs that after Kayssler was shot, two young women hiding in his home were raped and murdered by the soldiers.

== Selected filmography ==
- The Tunnel (1915)
- Fridericus Rex (1922)
- The Love of a Queen (1923)
- Tragedy in the House of Habsburg (1924)
- Countess Donelli (1924)
- Mother and Child (1924)
- Destiny (1925)
- An Artist of Life (1925)
- Assassination (1927)
- A Modern Dubarry (1927)
- The Burning Heart (1929)
- Two People (1930)
- The Flute Concert of Sanssouci (1930)
- Cadets (1931)
- The Captain from Köpenick (1931)
- Yorck (1931)
- 24 Hours in the Life of a Woman (1931)
- Louise, Queen of Prussia (1931)
- The Man Who Murdered (1931)
- In the Employ of the Secret Service (1931)
- The Eleven Schill Officers (1932)
- Marshal Forwards (1932)
- Ship Without a Harbour (1932)
- Under False Flag (1932)
- Police Report (1934)
- Peer Gynt (1934)
- Gold (1934)
- The Higher Command (1935)
- Frisians in Peril (1935)
- The Old and the Young King (1935)
- The Girl from the Marsh Croft (1935)
- A Woman of No Importance (1936)
- The Broken Jug (1937)
- The Hound of the Baskervilles (1937)
- Anna Favetti (1938)
- Between the Parents (1938)
- Covered Tracks (1938)
- The Fox of Glenarvon (1940)

== Works ==
- Simplicius (1905)
- Sagen aus Mijnhejm (1909)
- Schauspielernotizen (1910–1914)
- Jan der Wunderbare (1917)
- Zwischen Tal und Berg der Welle (1917)
- Stunden in Jahren (1924)
