= Renée Héribel =

French actress (1903–1952)

- Born: 9 February 1903; Caen, Calvados, France
- Died: 25 July 1952 (aged 49); Neuilly-sur-Seine, France
- Other name: Renée Eugénie Aimée Héribel
- Occupation: Actress
- Years active: 1924-1933 (film)

Renée Héribel (9 February 1903 – 25 July 1952) was a French film actress.

== Selected filmography ==
- Madame Sans-Gêne (1925)
- Fanfan la Tulipe (1925)
- The White Slave (1927)
- The City of a Thousand Delights (1927)
- Prince Jean (1928)
- The Joker (1928)
- The King of Carnival (1928)
- Cagliostro (1929)
- The Three Masks (1929)
- The Night of Terror (1929)
- The Love Market (1930)
- Everybody Wins (1930)
- The Yellow House of Rio (1931)
- The Triangle of Fire (1932)

== Bibliography ==
- Goble, Alan. The Complete Index to Literary Sources in Film. Walter de Gruyter, 1999.
