= Inge and the Millions =

1933 film

- Directed by: Erich Engel
- Written by: Curt J. Braun; Emil Burri
- Produced by: Bruno Duday
- Starring: Brigitte Helm; Carl Esmond; Paul Wegener
- Cinematography: Werner Bohne; Carl Hoffmann
- Edited by: Milo Harbich
- Music by: P. Lesso-Valerio; Eric Plessow
- Production company: UFA
- Distributed by: UFA
- Release date: 22 December 1933
- Running time: 96 minutes
- Country: Germany
- Language: German

Inge and the Millions (German: Inge und die Millionen) is a 1933 German comedy film directed by Erich Engel and starring Brigitte Helm, Carl Esmond, and Paul Wegener. Produced by UFA, it was shot at the Babelsberg Studios in Potsdam. The film's sets were designed by Otto Erdmann and Hans Sohnle. Location filming took place in Berlin and around Lake Constance.

In line with the policies of the new Nazi government, the film was fiercely anti-capitalist and attacked Jewish financial speculators in particular.

== Cast ==
- Brigitte Helm as Inge, seine Sekretärin
- Carl Esmond as Walter Brink, Angestellter der Spedition
- Paul Wegener as Bankier Seemann
- Otto Wallburg as Conrady, Geschäftsfreund Seemanns
- Ernst Behmer as Kutzner, Geschäftsfreund Seemanns
- Lissy Arna as Kitty, Freundin von Conrady
- Ernst Karchow as Böttcher, Inhaber einer Speditionsfirma
- Franz Nicklisch as Lindemann, Angestellter der Spedition
- Paul Westermeier as Chauffeur Fritz, Angestellter der Spedition
- Charlotte Serda as Lotte, Lindemanns Frau
- Gerhard Bienert as Arbeiter

== Bibliography ==
- Bock, Hans-Michael; Bergfelder, Tim, eds. (2009). The Concise Cinegraph: Encyclopaedia of German Cinema. New York: Berghahn Books. ISBN 978-1-57181-655-9.
- James, Harold (2004). The Nazi Dictatorship and the Deutsche Bank. Cambridge: Cambridge University Press. ISBN 978-0-521-83874-0.
