= Professor Imhof =

1926 film

- Austrian release poster
- Directed by: Fred Sauer
- Written by: Max Jungk; Hans Land (novel)
- Produced by: Paul Ebner; Maxim Galitzenstein
- Starring: Albert Bassermann; Lee Parry; Paul Henckels
- Cinematography: Willy Gaebel; Willy Goldberger
- Production company: Maxim-Film
- Distributed by: Filmhaus Bruckmann
- Release date: 18 October 1926
- Country: Germany
- Languages: Silent; German intertitles

Professor Imhof or When the Heart Speaks to the Young (German: Wenn das Herz der Jugend spricht) is a 1926 German silent drama film directed by Fred Sauer and starring Albert Bassermann, Lee Parry and Paul Henckels.

The film's sets were designed by the art directors Otto Erdmann and Hans Sohnle.

== Cast ==
- Albert Bassermann as Professor Imhof
- Lee Parry
- Paul Henckels as Dr. Kerber
- Julius Messaros as Lucian
- Else Wasa as Frau von Arnsberg
- S.Z. Sakall as Dr. Hecht
- Frieda Lehndorf
- Sophie Pagay
- Philipp Manning

== Bibliography ==
- Grange, William. Cultural Chronicle of the Weimar Republic. Scarecrow Press, 2008.
