= The Poacher (1926 film) =

1926 film

- Directed by: Johannes Meyer
- Written by: Johannes Meyer
- Starring: Heinrich Schroth; Carl de Vogt; Rudolf Biebrach
- Cinematography: Gustave Preiss
- Production company: UFA
- Distributed by: UFA
- Release date: 20 January 1926
- Running time: 87 minutes
- Country: Germany
- Languages: Silent; German intertitles

The Poacher (German: Der Wilderer) is a 1926 German silent drama film directed by Johannes Meyer and starring Heinrich Schroth, Carl de Vogt and Rudolf Biebrach. Location shooting took place around Innsbruck and the Dolomites. The film's art direction was by Otto Erdmann and Hans Sohnle.

== Synopsis ==
After a deer is killed on his estate, a count hires a hunt to track down the poacher he believes is responsible.

== Cast ==
- Heinrich Schroth as Graf Oetzbach
- Carl de Vogt as Werner, Jäger des Grafen
- Rudolf Biebrach as Der alte Dorn, Jäger des Grafen
- Rudolf Rittner as Andreas Weiler, Bauer in Oetzbach
- Helga Thomas as Maria, seine Tochter
- Ellen Douglas as Cenz, seine Nichte
- Max Maximilian as Franz, sein Knecht
- Josef Peterhans as Baumgartner, Kaufmann in Oetzbach
- Hans Peter Peterhans as Der Geißbub
