= The Golden Calf (1925 film) =

1925 film

- Directed by: Peter Paul Felner
- Written by: Peter Paul Felner; Geza Herczeg
- Produced by: Julius Wachtel
- Starring: Henny Porten; Olga Engl; Rosa Valetti
- Cinematography: Mutz Greenbaum; Gustave Preiss
- Production company: Atlantic-Film Gesellschaft der Westi-Film
- Distributed by: Dewesti-Verleih
- Release date: 17 April 1925
- Running time: 87 minutes
- Country: Germany
- Languages: Silent; German intertitles

The Golden Calf (German: Das goldene Kalb) is a 1925 German silent drama film directed by Peter Paul Felner and starring Henny Porten, Olga Engl and Rosa Valetti. It was shot at the Halensee Studios in Berlin and on location in Dürnstein in Austria. The film's sets were designed by the art directors Otto Erdmann and Hans Sohnle.

== Cast ==
- Henny Porten as Magdalena
- Olga Engl as Frau Grahl
- Rosa Valetti as Frau Huber
- Angelo Ferrari as Nikolaus
- Alfred Schreiber as Fiber
- Colette Brettel as Judith
- Johannes Riemann as Paulus
- Ossip Runitsch as Leibgardist
- Friedrich Kühne as Auditor
- Albert Steinrück as Floris
- Edgar Klitzsch as Waisenvater

== Bibliography ==
- Grange, William. Cultural Chronicle of the Weimar Republic. Scarecrow Press, 2008.
