= Light-Hearted Isabel =

1927 film

- Gustav Fröhlich (left) and Lee Parry (centre) in a scene from the film
- Directed by: Eddy Busch; Arthur Wellin
- Written by: Eddy Busch; Hans H. Zerlett; Robert Gilbert (operetta)
- Produced by: Paul Ebner; Maxim Galitzenstein
- Starring: Lee Parry; Otto Wallburg; Gustav Fröhlich
- Cinematography: Georg Bruckbauer; Willy Goldberger
- Music by: Felix Bartsch
- Production company: Maxim-Film
- Distributed by: Filmhaus Bruckmann
- Release date: 7 April 1927
- Running time: 82 minutes
- Country: Germany
- Languages: Silent; German intertitles

Light-Hearted Isabel (German: Die leichte Isabell) is a 1927 German silent comedy film directed by Eddy Busch and Arthur Wellin and starring Lee Parry, Otto Wallburg, and Gustav Fröhlich. The film's sets were designed by the art directors Otto Erdmann and Hans Sohnle.

== Cast ==
- Lee Parry
- Otto Wallburg
- Gustav Fröhlich
- Adele Sandrock
- Julius Falkenstein
- Max Landa
- Eugen Rex
- Frida Richard
- Hans Wassmann

== Bibliography ==
- Grange, William (2008). Cultural Chronicle of the Weimar Republic. Lanham, MD: Scarecrow Press. ISBN 978-0-8108-5967-8.
