= A Day Will Come (1934 film) =

1934 film

- French film poster
- French: Un jour viendra
- Directed by: Gerhard Lamprecht; Serge Véber
- Written by: Theo Halton; Serge Véber; Josef Pelz von Felinau
- Produced by: Bruno Duday; Raoul Ploquin
- Starring: Käthe von Nagy; Jean-Pierre Aumont; Simone Héliard
- Cinematography: Werner Brandes
- Edited by: Erich Kobler
- Music by: Franz Doelle
- Production company: UFA
- Distributed by: L'Alliance Cinématographique Européenne
- Release date: 28 March 1934
- Running time: 80 minutes
- Country: Germany
- Language: French

A Day Will Come (French: Un jour viendra) is a 1934 comedy film directed by Gerhard Lamprecht and Serge Véber and starring Käthe von Nagy, Jean-Pierre Aumont and Simone Héliard. It was made by the German studio UFA as the French-language version of Just Once a Great Lady.

The film's sets were designed by the art directors Otto Erdmann and Hans Sohnle.

== Cast ==
- Käthe von Nagy
- Jean-Pierre Aumont as Henri de Langillier
- Simone Héliard as Ria
- Marfa d'Hervilly as Aunt Agathe
- Claude May as Francine
- Jacqueline Daix as Yvonne
- José Sergy as André de Langillier
- Charbonnier
- Chartier
- Gaston Dubosc
- Gustave Gallet
- Nono Lecorre
- Félix Oudart
- André Saint-Germain
