= My Aunt, Your Aunt (1927 film) =

1927 film directed by Carl Froelich

- Henny Porten in a scene from the film
- Directed by: Carl Froelich
- Written by: Robert Liebmann; Walter Supper; Hans Wilhelm
- Produced by: Carl Froelich; Henny Porten; Wilhelm von Kaufmann
- Starring: Ralph Arthur Roberts; Angelo Ferrari; Henny Porten
- Cinematography: Gustave Preiss
- Music by: Werner R. Heymann
- Production company: Henny Porten-Froelich-Produktion
- Distributed by: UFA
- Release date: 25 February 1927
- Running time: 94 minutes
- Country: Germany
- Languages: Silent; German intertitles

My Aunt, Your Aunt (German: Meine Tante – deine Tante) is a 1927 German silent comedy film directed by Carl Froelich and starring Ralph Arthur Roberts, Angelo Ferrari and Henny Porten. It was shot at the Tempelhof Studios in Berlin and premiered at the city's Ufa-Palast am Zoo. The film's sets were designed by the art director Franz Schroedter. It was made by the leading German studio of the era UFA GmbH and distributed as part of the Parufamet agreement.

It shares its name with two sound films released in 1939 and 1956.

== Cast ==
- Ralph Arthur Roberts as Bodo von Bocksdorf
- Angelo Ferrari as Edgar von Bocksdorf, dessen Neffe
- Henny Porten as Helene, seine Frau
- Harry Grunwald as Pepi Smith, Artist
- Leopold von Ledebur as Der Diener
- Willi Allen as Der Koch
- Marian Alma as Der Pfarrer
- Hans Baldner as Der Arzt
- Hugo Döblin as Der Apotheker
- Wilhelm Bendow as Dr. Gänsichen
- Alice Torning as Seine Braut

== Bibliography ==
- Grange, William. Cultural Chronicle of the Weimar Republic. Scarecrow Press, 2008.
