= Reaching for the Stars (film) =

1955 film

- Directed by: Carl-Heinz Schroth
- Written by: Helmut Käutner; Maria von der Osten-Sacken
- Produced by: Harald Braun; Georg Richter
- Starring: Erik Schumann; Liselotte Pulver; Gustav Knuth
- Cinematography: Friedl Behn-Grund; Dieter Wedekind
- Edited by: Hilwa von Boro
- Music by: Werner Eisbrenner
- Production company: N.D.F.-Produktion
- Distributed by: Allianz Filmverleih
- Release date: 30 June 1955
- Running time: 102 minutes
- Country: West Germany
- Language: German

Reaching for the Stars (German: Griff nach den Sternen) is a 1955 West German drama film directed by Carl-Heinz Schroth and starring Erik Schumann, Liselotte Pulver and Gustav Knuth.

The film's sets were designed by the art director Hans Sohnle. It was made at the Bavaria Studios in Munich. It was partly shot on location in Venice.

== Cast ==
- Erik Schumann as Turell
- Liselotte Pulver as Christine
- Gustav Knuth as Carlo
- Oliver Grimm as Christian
- Ilse Werner as Carola
- Anna-Maria Sandri as Kiki
- Nadja Tiller as Daniela
- Margarete Haagen as The Baroness
- Paul Henckels as Turell's father
- Sybil Werden as Elena
- Carsta Löck as Mrs. Vermeeren
- Michael Ande as Peppino
- Rudolf Vogel
- Paul Bildt

== Bibliography ==
- Bock, Hans-Michael & Bergfelder, Tim. The Concise Cinegraph: Encyclopaedia of German Cinema. Berghahn Books, 2009.
