= Angelo Ferrari =

Italian actor (1897–1945)

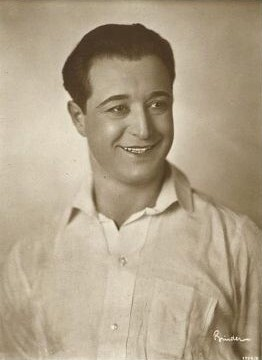
- Born: 14 August 1897; Rome, Italy
- Died: 15 June 1945 (aged 47); Niederlehme, Germany
- Occupation: Actor
- Years active: 1916-1945

Angelo Ferrari (14 August 1897 – 15 June 1945) was an Italian actor known for his work in German cinema.

== Selected filmography ==
- The Nude Woman (1922)
- The Green Manuela (1923)
- Samson (1923)
- The Faces of Love (1924)
- Prater (1924)
- The Circus Princess (1925)
- Jealousy (1925)
- The Golden Calf (1925)
- The Motorist Bride (1925)
- The Clever Fox (1926)
- Tea Time in the Ackerstrasse (1926)
- Battle of the Sexes (1926)
- When She Starts, Look Out (1926)
- The Flight in the Night (1926)
- Roses from the South (1926)
- Young Blood (1926)
- Heads Up, Charley (1927)
- Circus Renz (1927)
- My Aunt, Your Aunt (1927)
- Naples is a Song (1927)
- The Transformation of Dr. Bessel (1927)
- Orient Express (1927)
- Folly of Love (1928)
- The Lady and the Chauffeur (1928)
- Odette (1928)
- Pawns of Passion (1928)
- Five Anxious Days (1928)
- The Sinner (1928)
- The Story of a Little Parisian (1928)
- The Duty to Remain Silent (1928)
- The Carousel of Death (1928)
- Villa Falconieri (1928)
- The Third Confession (1929)
- Distinguishing Features (1929)
- The Youths (1929)
- Revolt in the Batchelor's House (1929)
- Of Life and Death (1930)
- Troika (1930)
- General Babka (1930)
- The Love Express (1931)
- Road to Rio (1931)
- The Theft of the Mona Lisa (1931)
- Queen of the Night (1931)
- Melody of Love (1932)
- The Escape to Nice (1932)
- Cavaliers of the Kurfürstendamm (1932)
- One Night with You (1932)
- Idylle au Caire (1933)
- Model Wanted (1933)
- Season in Cairo (1933)
- So Ended a Great Love (1934)
- Stradivari (1935)
- City of Anatol (1936)
- The Night With the Emperor (1936)
- Escapade (1936)
- Under Blazing Heavens (1936)
- Love's Awakening (1936)
- Victoria in Dover (1936)
- My Friend Barbara (1937)
- Fridericus (1937)
- Diamonds (1937)
- Tango Notturno (1937)
- Madame Bovary (1937)
- The Man Who Was Sherlock Holmes (1937)
- My Son the Minister (1937)
- Condottieri (1937)
- Such Great Foolishness (1937)
- Togger (1937)
- Fanny Elssler (1937)
- Faded Melody (1938)
- Napoleon Is to Blame for Everything (1938)
- The Day After the Divorce (1938)
- Nanon (1938)
- The Impossible Mister Pitt (1938)
- Comrades at Sea (1938)
- Red Orchids (1938)
- Maria Ilona (1939)
- The Dream of Butterfly (1939)
- Marriage in Small Doses (1939)
- The Sensational Casilla Trial (1939)
- Congo Express (1939)
- Der singende Tor (1939)
- A Man Astray (1940)
- Small Town Poet (1940)
- Between Hamburg and Haiti (1940)
- Counterfeiters (1940)
- The Three Codonas (1940)
- Roses in Tyrol (1940)
- The Swedish Nightingale (1941)
- Riding for Germany (1941)
- Mistress Moon (1941)
- Goodbye, Franziska (1941)
- Diesel (1942)
- The Thing About Styx (1942)
- Attack on Baku (1942)
- The Night in Venice (1942)
- An Old Heart Becomes Young Again (1943)
- Carnival of Love (1943)
- Laugh, Pagliacci (1943)
- Laugh Bajazzo (1943)
- Tonelli (1943)
- Bravo Acrobat! (1943)
- Melody of a Great City (1943)
- A Salzburg Comedy (1943)
- Women Are No Angels (1943)
- The Impostor (1944)
- A Man Like Maximilian (1945)
- Law of Love (1949)

== Bibliography ==
- Jung, Uli & Schatzberg, Walter. Beyond Caligari: The Films of Robert Wiene. Berghahn Books, 1999.
