= Bruno Duday =

German film producer (1880–1946)

- Born: 14 March 1880; Sieradz, Kalisz Governorate, Congress Poland
- Died: 31 January 1946 (aged 65); Berlin, Germany
- Occupation: Producer
- Years active: 1930–1939

Bruno Duday (14 March 1880 – 31 January 1946) was a German film producer. After military service during the First World War Duday worked for many years at Germany's largest studio UFA where he oversaw several films of the Swedish star Zarah Leander including To New Shores (1937). Duday was head of a production unit, under the overall control of studio head Ernst Hugo Correll. When the Second World War began, he resigned from UFA and volunteered for military service. He was in charge of a POW camp. Following his later capture by Allied forces at the end of the war, he suffered from ill health and died in Berlin in 1946. He was married several times, including to the Hungarian actress Maria von Tasnady.

== Selected filmography ==
- Love's Carnival (1930)
- The Stolen Face (1930)
- Farewell (1930)
- The Scoundrel (1931)
- The Wrong Husband (1931)
- Narcotics (1932)
- A Mad Idea (1932)
- The Black Hussar (1932)
- The White Demon (1932)
- Laughing Heirs (1933)
- Inge and the Millions (1933)
- What Men Know (1933)
- The Girlfriend of a Big Man (1934)
- Just Once a Great Lady (1934)
- A Day Will Come (1934)
- Fresh Wind from Canada (1935)
- The Higher Command (1935)
- The Gypsy Baron (1935)
- The Court Concert (1936)
- To New Shores (1937)
- Men Without a Fatherland (1937)
- The Blue Fox (1938)
- A Prussian Love Story (1938)
- By a Silken Thread (1938)
- Adrienne Lecouvreur (1938)

== Bibliography ==
- Kay Weniger: Das große Personenlexikon des Films. Die Schauspieler, Regisseure, Kameraleute, Produzenten, Komponisten, Drehbuchautoren, Filmarchitekten, Ausstatter, Kostümbildner, Cutter, Tontechniker, Maskenbildner und Special Effects Designer des 20. Jahrhunderts. Vol. 2: C – F. John Paddy Carstairs – Peter Fitz. Schwarzkopf & Schwarzkopf, Berlin 2001, ISBN 3-89602-340-3, p. 463 f.
- Langford, Michelle. Germany: Directory of World Cinema. Intellect Books, 2012.
