= Only on the Rhine =

1930 film directed by Max Mack

- Directed by: Max Mack
- Written by: Jacques Bachrach; Fred Hildenbrand; Max Mack
- Produced by: Lothar Stark
- Starring: Daisy D'Ora; Igo Sym; Truus Van Aalten
- Cinematography: Akos Farkas; Mutz Greenbaum
- Edited by: Geza Pollatschik
- Music by: Fred Raymond; Werner Schmidt-Boelcke
- Production company: Lothar Stark-Film
- Distributed by: Süd-Film
- Release date: 16 July 1930
- Running time: 96 minutes
- Country: Germany
- Language: German

Only on the Rhine (German: Nur am Rhein...) is a 1930 German comedy film directed by Max Mack and starring Daisy D'Ora, Igo Sym, and Truus Van Aalten.

The film's sets were designed by Otto Erdmann and Hans Sohnle. Some location filming took place at Bacharach and Koblenz on the river Rhine.

== Cast ==
- Daisy D'Ora as Hanne
- Igo Sym as Kapitän Barrymore
- Truus Van Aalten as Lore, Hannes Freundin
- Julius Falkenstein as Dolmetscher und Agent Lehmann
- Emil Rameau as Der Bürgermeister
- Maria Reisenhofer as Seine Frau
- Carl Balhaus as Karl
- Teddy Bill as Houp, Barrymores Bursche
- Hugh Douglas as Englischer Oberst
- Lene Illing as Trude, Dienstmädchen
- Marcel Wittrisch as Sänger
- Rudi Horky as Sänger
- Sylvia Torf as Klatschweib
- Frieda Langendorf as Klatschweib
- Elly Jung as Klatschweib
- Frau Palitzsch as Klatschweib
- August Pätjer as Friseur
- Otto Reinwald
- Rudolf Schündler

== Bibliography ==
- Bock, Hans-Michael; Bergfelder, Tim, eds. (2009). The Concise Cinegraph: Encyclopaedia of German Cinema. New York: Berghahn Books. ISBN 978-1-57181-655-9.
