= The Lady and the Chauffeur =

1928 film directed by Manfred Noa

- Directed by: Manfred Noa
- Written by: Königsfeld (novel); Herbert Juttke; Georg C. Klaren
- Produced by: Manfred Noa
- Starring: Jack Trevor; Fritz Alberti; Elisabeth Pinajeff
- Cinematography: Alfred Hansen
- Production company: Noa-Film
- Distributed by: Süd-Film
- Release date: 3 July 1928
- Running time: 113 minutes
- Country: Germany
- Languages: Silent; German intertitles

The Lady and the Chauffeur (German: Die Dame und ihr Chauffeur) is a 1928 German silent comedy film directed by Manfred Noa and starring Jack Trevor, Fritz Alberti and Elisabeth Pinajeff. It was shot at the Grunewald Studios and on location in Trieste and Ragusa in the Adriatic. The film's sets were designed by the art directors Hans Sohnle and Otto Erdmann.

== Cast ==
- Jack Trevor as Jan Derrik
- Fritz Alberti as Mr. Reginald Prittspitt
- Elisabeth Pinajeff as Bicky, seine Tochter
- Sig Arno as Arnolescu, der Sekretär
- Fritz Kampers as George, der Kammerdiener
- Charlotte Ander as Elli, die Jungfer
- Angelo Ferrari as Baron Hektor Suedar
- Yvette Darnys as Yvette, eine Tänzerin
- Jaro Fürth as Dr. Eck
- Aribert Wäscher as Thibault, Juwelier
- Philipp Manning as Lawyer Liemann
- Hugo Döblin

== Bibliography ==
- Bock, Hans-Michael & Bergfelder, Tim. The Concise CineGraph. Encyclopedia of German Cinema. Berghahn Books, 2009.
