= Just Once a Great Lady (1934 film) =

1934 film

- Directed by: Gerhard Lamprecht
- Written by: Theo Halton; Josef Pelz von Felinau
- Produced by: Bruno Duday
- Starring: Käthe von Nagy; Wolf Albach-Retty; Gretl Theimer; Werner Fuetterer
- Cinematography: Werner Brandes
- Edited by: Milo Harbich
- Music by: Franz Doelle
- Production company: UFA
- Distributed by: UFA
- Release date: 10 February 1934
- Running time: 90 minutes
- Country: Nazi Germany
- Language: German

Just Once a Great Lady (German: Einmal eine große Dame sein) is a 1934 German comedy film directed by Gerhard Lamprecht and starring Käthe von Nagy, Wolf Albach-Retty and Gretl Theimer. Nagy plays a car saleswoman. The film's sets were designed by the art directors Otto Erdmann and Hans Sohnle. A separate French-language version A Day Will Come (1934) was also released, with Nagy reprising her role alongside Jean-Pierre Aumont.

In 1957 the film title was used for a West German remake of the 1932 film The Countess of Monte Cristo.

== Cast ==
- Käthe von Nagy as Kitty Holm
- Wolf Albach-Retty as Heinz von Wolfenstein
- Gretl Theimer as Ria Thurner
- Werner Fuetterer as Wolf von Wolfenstein
- Ida Wüst as Baroness Agathe von Wolfenstein
- Gustav Waldau as Baron Adalbert von Wolfenstein
- Carola Höhn as Hilde
- Hans von Zedlitz as Mr Thurner
- Elfriede Sandner as Franzi, Studentin
- Josef Thuis as Student
- Peter Michael as Student
- Bert Schmidt-Maris as Flugschüler
- Tommy Thomas as Pathfinder
- Assy Oehm
- Werner Finck
- Hans Junkermann
- Hadrian Maria Netto
- Fritz Odemar
- Werner Scharf
- Arthur Schroder
- Grethe Weiser

== Bibliography ==
- Bock, Hans-Michael; Bergfelder, Tim, eds. (2009). The Concise Cinegraph: Encyclopaedia of German Cinema. New York: Berghahn Books. ISBN 978-1-57181-655-9.
- Hake, Sabine (2001). Popular Cinema of the Third Reich. Austin: University of Texas Press. ISBN 978-0-292-73458-6.
