= Tea Time in the Ackerstrasse =

1926 film

- German: Fünf-Uhr-Tee in der Ackerstraße
- Directed by: Paul L. Stein
- Written by: Alfred Schirokauer; Reinhold Schünzel
- Starring: Reinhold Schünzel; Mary Nolan; Fritz Kampers
- Cinematography: Franz Planer
- Production company: Domo-Film
- Distributed by: Domo-Film
- Release date: 29 March 1926
- Country: Germany
- Languages: Silent; German intertitles

Tea Time in the Ackerstrasse (German: Fünf-Uhr-Tee in der Ackerstraße) is a 1926 German silent drama film directed by Paul L. Stein and starring Reinhold Schünzel, Mary Nolan and Fritz Kampers.

The film's sets were designed by Otto Erdmann and Hans Sohnle.

== Cast ==
- Reinhold Schünzel
- Mary Nolan
- Maria Kamradek
- Fritz Kampers
- Heinrich Schroth
- Angelo Ferrari
- Frigga Braut
- Rosa Valetti
