= The House by the Sea (1924 film) =

1924 film

- Directed by: Fritz Kaufmann
- Written by: Fritz Kaufmann; Bobby E. Lüthge; Stefan Zweig (play)
- Produced by: Heinrich Nebenzahl
- Starring: Asta Nielsen; Gregori Chmara; Albert Steinrück
- Cinematography: Alfredo Lenci; Erich Waschneck
- Music by: Bruno Schulz
- Production company: Nero Film
- Release date: 28 March 1924
- Country: Germany
- Languages: Silent; German intertitles

The House by the Sea (German: Das Haus am Meer) is a 1924 German silent film directed by Fritz Kaufmann and starring Asta Nielsen, Gregori Chmara and Albert Steinrück. The film is adapted from the 1912 play of the same name (Das Haus am Meer) by Stefan Zweig.

The art direction was by Kurt Richter.

== Plot ==
Fisherman Enrico is living happily with his wife Teresa when a band of soldiers appear and accuse her of prostitution. As Enrico's brother is tricked into the army, Enrico takes his place. Teresa's love for him conquers all.

== Cast ==
- Asta Nielsen as Teresa, Enrico's wife
- Gregori Chmara as Enrico, Fisherman
- Albert Steinrück as Werber
- Carl Auen as Gino
- Alexandra Sorina as his wife
- Hermann Vallentin as Sergeant
- Rudolf Del Zopp as Ohm

== Bibliography ==
- Grange, William. Cultural Chronicle of the Weimar Republic. Scarecrow Press, 2008.
