= Norbert Falk =

Austrian journalist and screenwriter

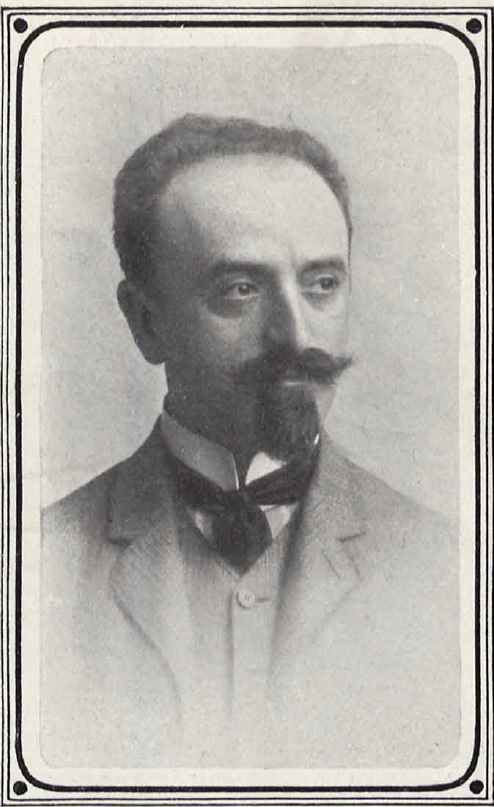
- Born: 5 November 1872; Hranice, Austria-Hungary
- Died: 16 September 1932 (aged 59); Berlin, Germany
- Occupations: Screenwriter, journalist
- Years active: 1896–1928

Norbert Falk, also credited as Fred Orbing (5 November 1872 – 16 September 1932), was an Austrian journalist, screenwriter and writer. He is best known as a screenwriter for German films made under the Weimar Republic, such as Madame Dubarry (1919), Anna Boleyn (1920), Rosita (1923) and Der Kongreß tanzt (1931). He wrote as journalist for German newspaper B.Z. am Mittag.

== Selected filmography ==
- Carmen (1918)
- A Waltz Dream (1925)
- The Loves of Casanova (1927)
- The White Slave (1927)
- Orient (1928)
- Pawns of Passion (1928)
- The Case of Prosecutor M (1928)
- Secrets of the Orient (1928)
- The Last Night (1928)
- Two Worlds (1930)
- Congress Dances (1932)

== Bibliography ==
- (in German) Kay Weniger: Das große Personenlexikon des Films, Volume 2, p 609. Berlin (2001) ISBN 3-89602-340-3
