= Akos Farkas (cinematographer) =

Hungarian cinematographer (1898–1971)

- Born: 9 September 1898; Austro-Hungarian Empire
- Died: 2 February 1971 (aged 72); United States
- Occupation: Cinematographer
- Years active: 1923-1954

Akos Farkas (1898–1971) was a Hungarian-born cinematographer who worked in a number of different countries including Germany, the Netherlands, Italy, Canada and the United States. He worked on more than thirty films during his career including Frederic Zelnik's The Forester's Daughter (1931) Because of his Jewish heritage, Farkas had to leave Germany following the Nazi takeover in 1933.

== Selected filmography ==
- The Third Watch (1924)
- The Bohemian Dancer (1926)
- Five Anxious Days (1928)
- The President (1928)
- On the Reeperbahn at Half Past Midnight (1929)
- Only on the Rhine (1930)
- Marriage Strike (1930)
- Road to Rio (1931)
- Salto Mortale (1931)
- The Forester's Daughter (1931)
- Willem van Oranje (1934)
- Pygmalion (1937)
- The Three Wishes (1937)
- Star of the Sea (1938)
- All of Life in One Night (1938)
- I Want to Live with Letizia (1938)

== Bibliography ==
- Klossner, Michael. The Europe of 1500-1815 on Film and Television. McFarland & Co., 2002.
- Prawer, S.S. Between Two Worlds: The Jewish Presence in German and Austrian Film, 1910-1933. Berghahn Books, 2005.
- Biemans, Jac. Ergens in Nederland: Akos Farkas cameraman op de vlucht 1933-1945. Boom, 2026.
