= The City of Pleasure (Bennett novel) =

1907 novel by Arnold Bennett

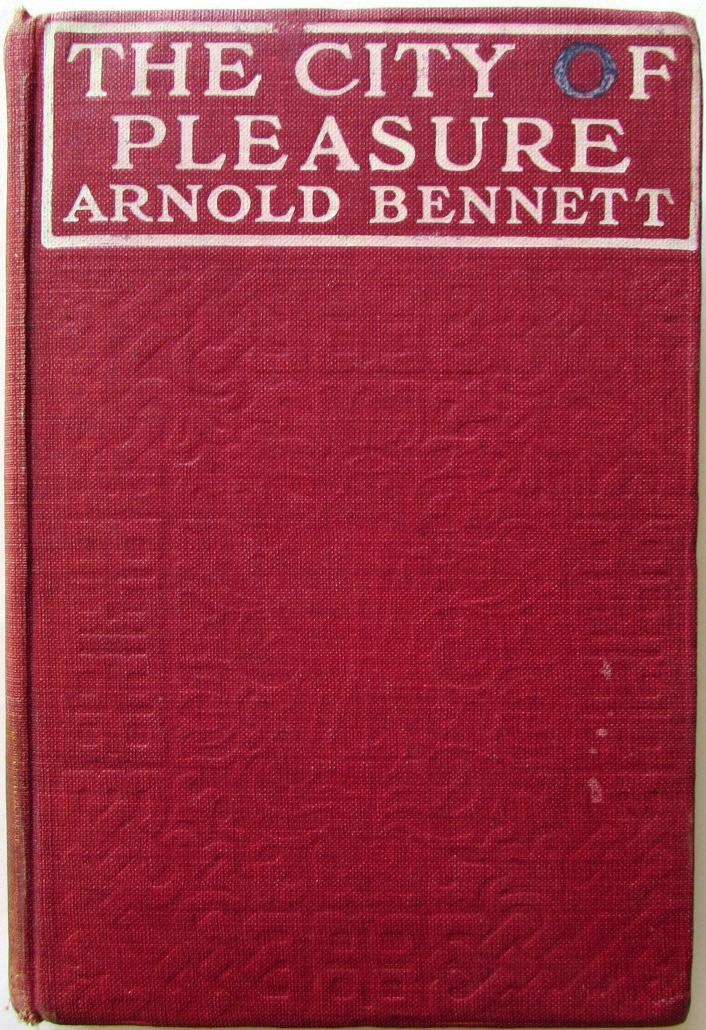
- American first edition
- Author: Arnold Bennett
- Language: English
- Genre: Fiction
- Publisher: Chatto & Windus
- Publication date: 1907
- Publication place: United Kingdom

The City of Pleasure is a 1907 novel by the British writer Arnold Bennett. Bennett was working on the idea as early as 1903, but it took several years to develop during which time it altered significantly from Bennett's original idea. It was first submitted in 1905. It was serialised in The Sentinel in 1906 and drew a mixed critical response compared to his earlier work The Grand Babylon Hotel. Bennett's publishers Chatto & Windus bought the rights, despite misgivings, in order to not lose Bennett to another publishing house. The book sold disappointingly and by 1919, it had shifted only 2,500 copies, well short of the 10,000 needed to cover the advance payment to Bennett.

== Film adaptation ==
In 1927 the novel was adapted into a German silent film The City of a Thousand Delights directed by Carmine Gallone and starring Paul Richter, Adele Sandrock, and Langhorn Burton.

== Bibliography ==
- Hepburn, James. Arnold Bennett. Routledge, 2013.
- Rappaport, Erika. Shopping for Pleasure: Women in the Making of London's West End. Princeton University Press, 2021.
