= Regine (1935 film) =

1935 film

- Directed by: Erich Waschneck
- Written by: Gottfried Keller (novella); Erich Waschneck
- Starring: Luise Ullrich; Anton Walbrook; Olga Chekhova
- Cinematography: Werner Brandes
- Edited by: W.L. Bagier
- Music by: Clemens Schmalstich
- Production company: Fanal-Filmproduktion
- Release date: 7 January 1935
- Running time: 90 minutes
- Country: Germany
- Language: German

Regine is a 1935 German drama film directed by Erich Waschneck and starring Luise Ullrich, Anton Walbrook and Olga Chekhova. It was shot at the Grunewald Studios in Berlin. The film's sets were designed by Otto Erdmann and Hans Sohnle.

== Cast ==
- Luise Ullrich as Regine
- Anton Walbrook as Frank Reynold, Ingenieur
- Olga Chekhova as Floris Bell, Schauspielerin
- Ekkehard Arendt as Merlin, Floris Bells Begleiter
- Hans Junkermann as Professor Gisevius, Franks Onkel
- Eduard von Winterstein as Keller, Regines Vater
- Hans Adalbert Schlettow as Robert, Regines Bruder
- Kurt Ackermann
- Olga Engl as Frau Sendig
- Walter Gross
- Erich Gühne
- Trude Haefelin
- Eric Harden
- Jutta Jol
- Otto Kronburger
- Carl Walther Meyer
- Hermann Meyer-Falkow
- Aribert Mog
- Ernst Albert Schaach
- Betty Sedlmayr
- Julia Serda as Frau von Steckler
- Martha von Konssatzki as Obstfrau

== Bibliography ==
- Bock, Hans-Michael & Bergfelder, Tim. The Concise Cinegraph: Encyclopaedia of German Cinema. Berghahn Books, 2009.
- Klaus, Ulrich J. Deutsche Tonfilme: Jahrgang 1933. Klaus-Archiv, 1988.
