= Willy Goldberger =

German-Spanish cinematographer

Willy Goldberger (1898–1961) was a German-Spanish cinematographer. On some Spanish films he is credited as Guillermo Goldberger.

== Selected filmography ==
- The Heiress of the Count of Monte Cristo (1919)
- The Yellow Diplomat (1920)
- The Law of the Desert (1920)
- Fanny Elssler (1920)
- The Princess of the Nile (1920)
- The Convict of Cayenne (1921)
- The Buried Self (1921)
- The House in Dragon Street (1921)
- Trix, the Romance of a Millionairess (1921)
- Miss Beryll (1921)
- Memoirs of a Film Actress (1921)
- The Golden Plague (1921)
- About the Son (1921)
- Hazard (1921)
- The Lodging House for Gentleman (1922)
- Tania, the Woman in Chains (1922)
- Raskolnikow (1923)
- The Man at Midnight (1924)
- The Power of Darkness (1924)
- Curfew (1925)
- People in Need (1925)
- Ash Wednesday (1925)
- The Dice Game of Life (1925)
- Professor Imhof (1926)
- The Good Reputation (1926)
- German Hearts on the German Rhine (1926)
- The Clever Fox (1926)
- Children's Souls Accuse You (1927)
- The Awakening of Woman (1927)
- Alpine Tragedy (1927)
- The Woman Who Couldn't Say No (1927)
- U-9 Weddigen (1927)
- Light-Hearted Isabel (1927)
- Serenissimus and the Last Virgin (1928)
- The Abduction of the Sabine Women (1928)
- Princess Olala (1928)
- Adam and Eve (1928)
- Casanova's Legacy (1928)
- Modern Pirates (1928)
- Column X (1929)
- Perjury (1929)
- My Daughter's Tutor (1929)
- The Green Monocle (1929)
- Father and Son (1929)
- Two Hearts in Waltz Time (1930)
- The Song Is Ended (1930)
- A Gentleman for Hire (1930)
- Delicatessen (1930)
- Panic in Chicago (1931)
- Madame Bluebeard (1931)
- Weekend in Paradise (1931)
- My Leopold (1931)
- I Go Out and You Stay Here (1931)
- The Theft of the Mona Lisa (1931)
- Road to Rio (1931)
- Schubert's Dream of Spring (1931)
- Hooray, It's a Boy! (1931)
- The Merry Wives of Vienna (1931)
- No Money Needed (1932)
- A Man with Heart (1932)
- I Do Not Want to Know Who You Are (1932)
- Tell Me Tonight (1932)
- One Night with You (1932)
- A Bit of Love (1932)
- Monsieur, Madame and Bibi (1932)
- The Testament of Cornelius Gulden (1932)
- The Rebel (1932)
- The Racokzi March (1933)
- One Night's Song (1933)
- Madame Wants No Children (1933)
- What Women Dream (1933)
- A Precocious Girl (1934)
- Everything for the Company (1935)
- The Wicked Carabel (1935)
- Her Highness Dances the Waltz (1935)
- Fräulein Lilli (1936)
- Cafe Moscow (1936)
- Witches' Night (1937)
- Happy Vestköping (1937)
- Comrades in Uniform (1938)
- Whirlwind (1941)
- Malvaloca (1942)
- Cristina Guzmán (1943)
- El 13 – 13 (1943)
- Life Begins at Midnight (1944)
- A New Play (1946)
- Esa pareja feliz (1951)
- Service at Sea (1951)
- The Seventh Page (1951)
