= The White Slave (1927 film) =

1927 German silent drama film

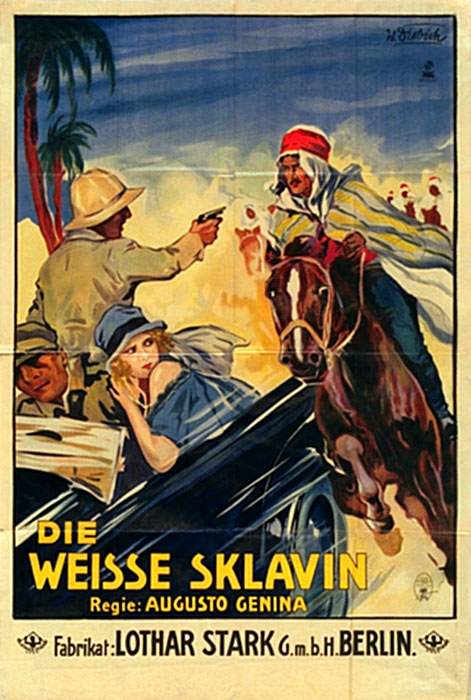
- Directed by: Augusto Genina
- Written by: Norbert Falk; Augusto Genina
- Produced by: Lothar Stark
- Starring: Liane Haid; Vladimir Gajdarov; Harry Hardt
- Cinematography: Gustave Preiss
- Music by: Gustav Gold
- Production companies: Lothar Stark-Film; Wolfe Productions
- Release date: 22 September 1927
- Running time: 96 minutes
- Country: Germany
- Languages: Silent; German intertitles

The White Slave (German: Die weisse Sklavin) is a 1927 German silent drama film directed by Augusto Genina and starring Liane Haid, Vladimir Gajdarov and Harry Hardt. The film's sets were designed by Otto Erdmann and Hans Sohnle. A remake of the same name was filmed in Germany in 1937.

The White Slave" is a 1927 German silent drama film directed by Augusto Genina. The film stars Liane Haid as Lady Mary Watson, Vladimir Gajdarov as Ali Benver Bey, and Harry Hardt as Brefont. The narrative follows Olga, a Frenchwoman of high social standing, who marries Ali Benver Bey, an Arab, against the counsel of her friends, including Dr. Alex Werner, the Bey's physician. Upon relocating to Arabia, Olga initially experiences happiness but soon confronts the challenges of adapting to Arab customs and her husband's growing possessiveness. The story explores themes of cultural clash and personal freedom.

== Cast ==
- Liane Haid as Lady Mary Watson, die weiße Sklavin
- Vladimir Gajdarov as Ali Benver Bey
- Harry Hardt as Brefont
- Charles Vanel as Dr. Warner
- Renée Héribel as Fatme, Alis Frau
- Anatol Potock
- Lucille Barns
- Oreste Bilancia
- Nino Ottavi

== Bibliography ==
- Grange, William. Cultural Chronicle of the Weimar Republic. Scarecrow Press, 2008.
