= Scampolo (1932 film) =

1932 film directed by Hans Steinhoff

- Directed by: Hans Steinhoff
- Written by: Dario Niccodemi (play); Max Kolpé; Felix Salten; Billy Wilder
- Produced by: Lothar Stark
- Starring: Dolly Haas; Karl Ludwig Diehl; Oskar Sima; Paul Hörbiger
- Cinematography: Hans Androschin; Curt Courant
- Edited by: Ella Ensink
- Music by: Artur Guttmann; Franz Waxman
- Production company: Lothar Stark-Film
- Distributed by: Bavaria Film
- Release date: 26 October 1932
- Running time: 86 minutes
- Countries: Germany; Austria
- Language: German

Scampolo (German: Scampolo, ein Kind der Straße) is a 1932 German comedy film directed by Hans Steinhoff and starring Dolly Haas, Karl Ludwig Diehl and Oskar Sima. The film is an adaptation of the Italian play Scampolo by Dario Niccodemi, which has been turned into numerous films. It was shot at the Sievering Studios in Vienna.

== Cast ==
- Dolly Haas as Scampolo
- Karl Ludwig Diehl as Maximilian
- Oskar Sima as Philippe
- Paul Hörbiger as Gabriel
- Hedwig Bleibtreu as Frau Schmid

== See also ==
- Scampolo (1928)
- Scampolo (1958)

== Bibliography ==
- Hake, Sabine. Popular Cinema of the Third Reich. University of Texas Press, 2001.
