= Gustav Fröhlich =

German actor and film director (1902–1987)

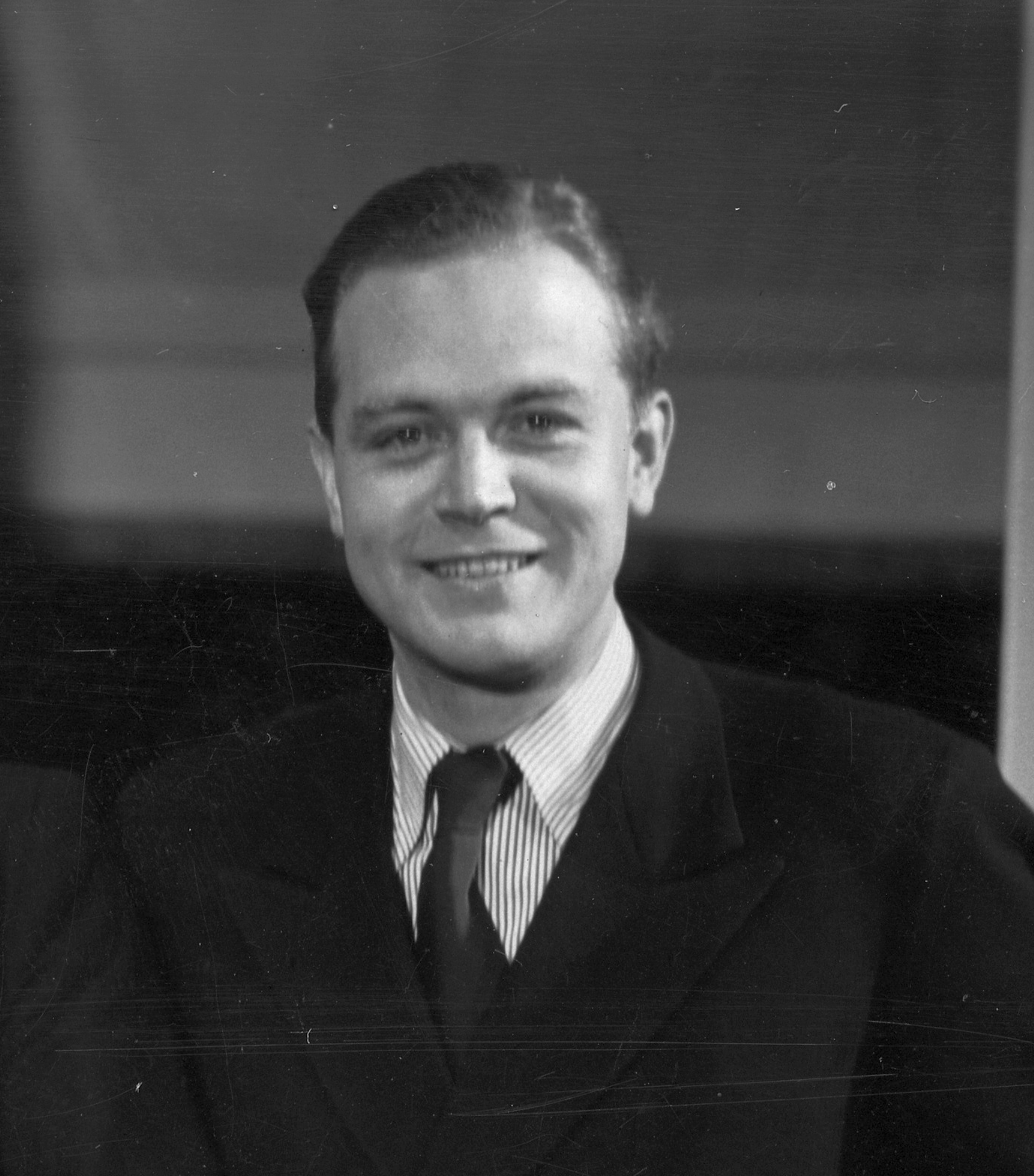
- Fröhlich in 1938
- Born: 21 March 1902; Hanover, German Empire
- Died: 22 December 1987 (aged 85); Lugano, Switzerland
- Occupations: Actor; film director
- Years active: 1922–1956 (sporadically until early 1980s)
- Spouse(s): Gitta Alpar (1931–1935, divorced) (1 child); Maria Hajek (1941–1987, her death)

Gustav Friedrich Fröhlich (21 March 1902 – 22 December 1987) was a German actor and film director. He landed secondary roles in a number of films and plays before landing his breakthrough role of Freder Fredersen in Fritz Lang's 1927 film Metropolis. He remained a popular film star in Germany until the 1950s.

== Early life and career ==
Gustav Fröhlich was born an illegitimate child in Hanover and was raised by foster parents. Before becoming an actor, he worked for a short time as an editor of a provincial newspaper and as the author of popular novels. During World War I, he also volunteered for duty in occupied Brussels as a press supervisor.

=== Weimar Republic ===
Gustav Fröhlich began his stage career in the early 1920s at minor theatres in Germany. He quickly achieved more important roles and appeared as The Prince of Homburg at the Deutsche Theater under the direction of Max Reinhardt.

One of Fröhlich's first film roles was composer Franz Liszt in Paganini in 1922. This was followed by a string of bit parts and supporting roles in films.

He landed his breakthrough role as the "dashing" Freder Fredersen in Fritz Lang's epic film Metropolis (1927). Fröhlich described Lang as a demanding director, recalling that "In scenes of physical discomfort, he tormented his actors until they did suffer".

Although the film itself was a financial failure, it established him as a leading film star in Germany. He was also notable for his appearance in Asphalt (1929), in which his restrained performance is still impressive today. In 1930, he was called to Hollywood to play roles in German versions of American films such as Die heilige Flamme and Kismet. He often appeared in musicals or comedies as a romantic hero and smart gentleman.

=== Third Reich ===
In 1933, Fröhlich directed the film Rakoczy-Marsch, in which he also portrayed the leading role. He would direct another seven films and was screenwriter on five, until the 1950s.

During the Third Reich, Gustav Fröhlich remained one of the foremost male stars in German film (along with Hans Albers, Willy Fritsch and Heinz Rühmann). Between 1931 and 1935, Fröhlich was married to Hungarian opera star, and actress Gitta Alpár, with whom he had a child, Julika.

For a time, he lived with the actress Lida Baarova until she became involved with the Nazi propaganda minister, Joseph Goebbels.

There is also an unconfirmed story that Fröhlich slapped Goebbels in a fit of jealous rage. In 1937, he rented his house in Berchtesgaden to Hitler's architect, Albert Speer. In 1941, he served in the Wehrmacht Landschützen-Regiment and in the same year, married Maria Hajek. They remained married until her death in 1987.

== Later life ==
Gustav Fröhlich was seldom involved in Nazi propaganda films, a fact that helped him to establish a new film career after World War II. He remained a busy actor after the war but his roles changed from leading men to supporting parts as he got older. His best-known role during this time was perhaps in Die Sünderin (1951) with Hildegard Knef, in which Fröhlich portrayed a terminally ill painter. Die Sünderin caused a scandal because of its open treatment of several taboos such as nudity, suicide and euthanasia.

Fröhlich retired from the film business in 1956, but he still managed to make occasional film and television appearances until the early 1980s. In 1973, he received the German Film Award for Lifetime Achievements. From 1956, Fröhlich lived in Lugano, Switzerland, where he died in 1987, from complications after surgery.

== Selected filmography ==
- De bruut (1922)
- Paganini (1923) – Franz von Liszt
- The Way to the Light (1923)
- Frisian Blood (1925) – Jörg Larsen Fischer
- Ship in Distress (1925) – Harry Petersen
- The Woman Who Did (1925) – James Compson
- The Woman Who Couldn't Say No (1927) – Edgar Jefferson
- Metropolis (1927) – Freder Fredersen – Joh Fredersens Sohn
- Light-Hearted Isabel (1927)
- Eva and the Grasshopper (1927) – Armand Noret
- Their Last Love Affair (1927) – Marys Mann
- Gehetzte Frauen (1927) – Junger Fürst
- The Master of Nuremberg (1927) – Walter von Stolzing
- The Eleven Devils (1927) – Tommy, der Mittelstürmer
- Tough Guys, Easy Girls (1927) – Martin Overbeck jun.
- The Duty to Remain Silent (1928) – Gerhard, ihr Sohn
- The Market of Life (1928)
- The Foreign Legionnaire (1928) – Martin Frey
- Angst (1928)
- The Green Alley (1928) – Gustav Brenner
- Homecoming (1928) – Karl
- Hurrah! I Live! (1928) – Hendrik Hansen
- The Burning Heart (1929) – Georg Wittig
- Asphalt (1929) – Wachtmeister Albert Holk
- High Treason (1929) – Wassil Gurmai
- The Immortal Vagabond (1930) – Hans Ritter
- Fire in the Opera House (1930) – Richard Faber
- Two People (1930) – Junker Rochus
- Liebeslied (1931) – Heinrich Brandt
- Kismet (1931)
- Inquest (1931) – Fritz Bernt, Student
- The Sacred Flame (1931)
- Gloria (1931) – Georg Köhler
- A Waltz by Strauss (1931) – Johann Strauß – der Sohn
- Liebeskommando (1931) – Leutnant von Lorenz
- My Leopold (1931)
- Sang viennois (1931)
- Under False Flag (1932) – Hauptmann Herbert Frank
- The Company's in Love (1932) – Werner Loring jr. - stellvertr. Direktor der Ideal Tonfilm
- Gitta Discovers Her Heart (1932) – Peter, Komponist
- Ein Lied, ein Kuss, ein Mädel (1932) – Peter Franke
- I Do Not Want to Know Who You Are (1932) – Robert Lindt
- A Man with Heart (1932) – Paul Ritter
- What Women Dream (1933) – Walter Koenig
- Die Nacht der großen Liebe (1933) – Holger Rhon
- Sonnenstrahl (1933) – Hans
- Rund um eine Million (1933) – Léon Saval
- The Racokzi March (1933, also directed) Oberleutnant Tarjan
- Gardez le sourire (1933) – Jean
- The Fugitive from Chicago (1934) – Michael Nissen
- Abenteuer eines jungen Herrn in Polen (1934, director) – Leutnant von Keller
- Sergeant Schwenke (1934) – Oberwachtmeister Willi Schwenke
- Barcarole (1935) – Eugen Colloredo
- A Night of Change (1935) – Frank Cornelius
- Stradivari (1935) – Sándor Teleki
- Leutnant Bobby, der Teufelskerl (1935) – Leutnant Bobby Tompson
- Liebesleute (1935) – Hermann v. Goren
- Es flüstert die Liebe (1935) – Peter von Ronan
- Die Entführung (1936) – Gerard Frehel
- The Impossible Woman (1936) – Ingenieur Wiegand
- The Hour of Temptation (1936) – Rechtsanwalt Dr. Leuttern
- Inkognito (1936) – Severin Matthias
- City of Anatol (1936) – Jacques Gregor
- Dangerous Crossing (1937) – Hans Scheffler – U-Bahn-Beamter
- Alarm in Peking (1937) – Oberleutnant Brock
- Gabriele: eins, zwei, drei (1937) – Der Ingenieur
- The Great and the Little Love (1938) – Prinz Louis Alexander alias Dr. Alexander Bordam
- Frau Sixta (1938) – Markus
- Secret Mission (1938) – Jan Jenssen, Steuermann
- Renate in the Quartet (1939) – Kurt Kielmansdorf
- Alarm at Station III (1939) – Arne Kolk, Zollwachtmeister
- Goodbye Vienna (1939) – Franz Mansfield
- Her Private Secretary (1940) – Der Privatsekretär
- Alles Schwindel (1940) – Peter Graf von Asfeld
- Herz – modern möbliert (1940) – Thomas Ostenhoff
- Herz geht vor Anker (1940) – Fritz Ullmann
- Clarissa (1941) – Lutz Bornhoff
- Six Days of Leave (1941) – Unteroffizier Werner Holt
- Der Große König (1942) – Sgt. Treskow
- With the Eyes of a Woman (1942) – Paul von Detky
- Tolle Nacht (1943) – Peter
- The Buchholz Family (1944) – Dr. Wrenzchen
- Marriage of Affection (1944) – Dr. Franz Wrenzchen
- Der Große Preis (1944) – Westhoff
- Das Konzert (1944) – Dr. Jura
- Tell the Truth (1946) – Peter Hellmer
- Paths in Twilight (1948, director) – Otto Lukas
- The Lost Face (1948) – Dr. Thomas Martin
- An Everyday Story (1948) – Bernd Falkenhagen
- I'll Never Forget That Night (1949) – Dr. Paul Schröter
- Der große Fall (1949) – Cerberus, der Tausendsassa
- The Prisoner (1949, only director)
- This Man Belongs to Me (1950) – Dr. Wilhelm Löhnefink
- The Lie (1950, only director)
- The Sinner (1951) – Alexander Kless
- Stips (1951) – Dr. Klaus Michael Dirkhoff, genannt Stips
- Torreani (1951, also directed) – Erich Holsten
- Adventure in Vienna (1952) – Toni Sponer
- House of Life (1952) – Dr. Peter Haidt
- Marriage for One Night (1953) – Pedro
- We'll Talk About Love Later (1953) – Jonny Pitter
- The Little Town Will Go to Sleep (1954) – Peter Bruck – Bildhauer
- Roses from the South (1954) – Julien de Costa
- Ball of Nations (1954) – Percy Buck
- His Daughter is Called Peter (1955, only director)
- The First Day of Spring (1956) – Paul Frank
- Vergiß wenn Du kannst (1956) – Dr. Georg Sudeny, ihr Gatte
- Sag nicht addio (1956)
- It Happened Only Once (1958) – Himself
- …und keiner schämte sich (1960) – Dr. Lebrecht
- Das Kriminalmuseum: Die Frau im Nerz (1963, TV Series) – Eberhard Eggers
- Die Dubarry (1963, TV Movie) – König Ludwig XV
- Laubenkolonie (1968, TV Movie) – Richard Scheibe
- Schicht in Weiß (1980, TV Series) – Dr. Sodener
- Pommi Stern (1981, TV Movie) – Alter Mann
