= Young Blood (1926 film) =

1926 film directed by Manfred Noa

- Directed by: Manfred Noa
- Written by: Max Glass
- Starring: Lya De Putti; Walter Slezak; Angelo Ferrari; Grete Mosheim
- Cinematography: Gustave Preiss
- Production company: Terra Film
- Distributed by: Terra Film
- Release date: 23 March 1926
- Country: Germany
- Languages: Silent; German intertitles

Young Blood (German: Junges Blut) is a 1926 German silent drama film directed by Manfred Noa and starring Lya De Putti, Walter Slezak and Angelo Ferrari. The film's art direction was by Oscar Friedrich Werndorff. It premiered in Berlin on 23 March 1926.

== Cast ==
- Lya De Putti as Schauspielerin Grita
- Walter Slezak as Oberprimaner
- Angelo Ferrari as Schlagertexter
- Grit Haid as Schauspielerin
- Grete Mosheim as Obersekundanerin
- Maria Reisenhofer as Mutter des Oberprimaners
- Emil Heyse
- Geza L. Weiss
- Julius Falkenstein
- Karl Etlinger
- Karl Elzer
- Rudolf Lettinger

== Bibliography ==
- Grange, William. Cultural Chronicle of the Weimar Republic. Scarecrow Press, 2008.
