= The Green Manuela =

1923 film directed by Ewald André Dupont

- Directed by: Ewald André Dupont
- Written by: Clara Ratzka (novel); Fritz Podehl; Imre Frey
- Produced by: Hanns Lippmann
- Starring: Lucie Labass; Josef Winter; Grete Berger; Angelo Ferrari
- Cinematography: Werner Brandes; Karl Puth
- Production company: Gloria-Film
- Distributed by: UFA
- Release date: 10 October 1923
- Country: Germany
- Languages: Silent; German intertitles

The Green Manuela (German: Die grüne Manuela) is a 1923 German silent drama film directed by Ewald André Dupont and starring Lucie Labass, Josef Winter and Grete Berger. The film is based on a novel by Clara Ratzka. A gypsy dancer becomes involved with some smugglers in Spain. The film's plot bears a number of similarities to Carmen. It was the first time Dupont worked with the cinematographer Werner Brandes and the art director Alfred Junge who were to become important collaborators with him.

The poster of this movie is seen in Russian director Dziga Vertov's movie Man with a Movie Camera (1929) playing at a theater named the Proletarian, symbolizing Vertov's disdain of Western fanciful films.

== Cast ==
- Lucie Labass as Manuela
- Josef Winter as Carlos Llorrente
- Grete Berger as Frau Gazul
- Kálmán Zátony as Juan Llorrente
- Angelo Ferrari as Count Henri d'Amirón
- Arthur Bergen as Pedro
- Lydia Potechina as Leocadia Barboza
- Louis Ralph as Alfredo
- Geo Bergal as Vincente Delano
- Franz Groß as Old Man Llorrente
- Ari Anzo as Tonia Llorrente
- William Dieterle as Brito
- Giorgio De Giorgetti as Sergeant

== Bibliography ==
- Bergfelder, Tim & Cargnelli, Christian. Destination London: German-speaking emigrés and British cinema, 1925-1950. Berghahn Books, 2008.
