= A Woman of No Importance (1936 film) =

1936 German film

- German film poster
- German: Eine Frau ohne Bedeutung
- Directed by: Hans Steinhoff
- Written by: Bernd Hofmann; Thea von Harbou
- Based on: A Woman of No Importance by Oscar Wilde
- Produced by: Helmut Eweler; Franz Tappers
- Starring: Gustaf Gründgens; Käthe Dorsch; Friedrich Kayßler
- Cinematography: Ewald Daub
- Edited by: Martha Dübber
- Music by: Clemens Schmalstich
- Production company: Majestic-Film
- Distributed by: Tobis Film
- Release date: 26 October 1936
- Running time: 81 minutes
- Country: Germany
- Language: German

A Woman of No Importance (German: Eine Frau ohne Bedeutung) is a 1936 German drama film directed by Hans Steinhoff and starring Gustaf Gründgens, Käthe Dorsch and Friedrich Kayßler. It is based on Oscar Wilde's play A Woman of No Importance. It was shot at the Johannisthal Studios in Berlin. The film's sets were designed by the art directors Otto Erdmann and Hans Sohnle.

== Cast ==
- Gustaf Gründgens as Lord George Illingworth
- Käthe Dorsch as Sylvia Kelvil
- Friedrich Kayßler as Pfarrer Kelvil
- Hans Leibelt as Lord Illingworth sen.
- Marianne Hoppe as Hester
- Albert Lieven as Gerald Arbuthnot
- Paul Henckels as Lord Hunstaton
- Käthe Haack as Lady Hunstaton
- Julia Serda as Lady Patricia
- Annemarie Steinsieck as Lady Caroline
- Friedl Haerlin as Lady Stutfield
- Genia Nikolaieva as Mrs. Allonwy
- Albert Florath as Lord Caverstam
- Hans Junkermann as Lord Pontefreat
- S. O. Schoening as Erzdiakon Daubeney
- Heinrich Marlow as Lord Ashley
- Hugo Werner-Kahle as Butler Wilkins
- Wolf Trutz as Clubdiener Ward
- Philipp Manning as Diener Parker
- Eduard Bornträger as Archer
- Karl Junge-Swinburne as Lord Warfield
- Borwin Walth as Johnson
- Art Winkler as Francis
- Alfred Karen as Lord Illingworth
- Charlotte Krause-Walter

== Bibliography ==
- Klaus, Ulrich J. Deutsche Tonfilme: Jahrgang 1936. Klaus-Archiv, 1988.
