= The Woman Who Couldn't Say No =

1927 film

- Hans Albers and Lee Parry in a scene from the film
- Directed by: Fred Sauer
- Written by: Eddy Busch
- Produced by: Paul Ebner; Maxim Galitzenstein
- Starring: Lee Parry; Gustav Fröhlich; Hans Albers
- Cinematography: Georg Bruckbauer; Willy Goldberger
- Music by: Willy Schmidt-Gentner
- Production company: Maxim-Film
- Distributed by: Filmhaus Bruckmann
- Release date: 6 January 1927
- Country: Germany
- Languages: Silent; German intertitles

The Woman Who Couldn't Say No (German: Die Frau die nicht nein sagen kann) is a 1927 German silent film directed by Fred Sauer and starring Lee Parry, Gustav Fröhlich and Hans Albers.

The film's sets were designed by the art directors Otto Erdmann and Hans Sohnle. It premiered at the Marmorhaus in Berlin.

== Cast ==
- Lee Parry
- Gustav Fröhlich as Edgar Jefferson
- Hans Albers
- Jean Dehelly
- Francine Mussey
- Sophie Pagay
- Hermann Picha

== Bibliography ==
- Grange, William. Cultural Chronicle of the Weimar Republic. Scarecrow Press, 2008.
