= Orient (1928 film) =

1928 film

- Directed by: Gennaro Righelli
- Written by: Norbert Falk; Gennaro Righelli
- Produced by: Lothar Stark
- Starring: Dolly Davis; Vladimir Gajdarov; Claire Rommer
- Cinematography: Mutz Greenbaum
- Production company: Lothar Stark-Film
- Distributed by: Deutsche Lichtspiel-Syndikat
- Release date: 18 February 1928
- Country: Germany
- Languages: Silent; German intertitles

Orient (German title: Frauenraub in Marokko) is a 1928 German silent adventure film directed by Gennaro Righelli and starring Dolly Davis, Vladimir Gajdarov and Claire Rommer. It was shot at the Halensee Studios in Berlin. The film's art direction was by Otto Erdmann and Hans Sohnle. It premiered at the Ufa-Pavillon am Nollendorfplatz.

== Cast ==
- Dolly Davis as Daisy
- Vladimir Gajdarov
- Claire Rommer as Elinor
- Gregori Chmara
- Aruth Wartan as Ros Ben Rawak
- Charlie Charlia as Bobby

== Bibliography ==
- Hans-Michael Bock and Tim Bergfelder. The Concise Cinegraph: An Encyclopedia of German Cinema. Berghahn Books.
