= Prater (film) =

1924 film

- Directed by: Peter Paul Felner
- Written by: Peter Paul Felner
- Produced by: Julius Wachtel
- Starring: Henny Porten; Cläre Lotto; Ossip Runitsch
- Cinematography: Mutz Greenbaum; Gustave Preiss
- Production companies: Atlantik-Film; Westi Film
- Distributed by: Dewesti-Verleih
- Release dates: November 1924 (Austria); 18 December 1924 (Berlin)
- Country: Germany
- Languages: Silent; German intertitles

Prater is a 1924 German silent film directed by Peter Paul Felner and starring Henny Porten, Cläre Lotto, and Ossip Runitsch.

The film's art direction was by Otto Erdmann and Hans Sohnle.

== Cast ==
- Henny Porten as Annemarie
- Cläre Lotto as Franzil
- Ossip Runitsch as Graf Rynon
- Angelo Ferrari as Marquis de Monroir
- Gertrud de Lalsky as Mutter des Marquis
- Lilian Jaernefelt as Gräfin Wy
- Friedrich Lobe as Diurnist
- Johannes Riemann as Fritz, Lokomotivführer
- Carl de Vogt as Martin, ein Matrose
- Auguste Prasch-Grevenberg as Die Amme
- Friedrich Kühne as Ein Landstreicher
- Griebel as First old sister
- Alice Hetsey as Second old sister
- M. Fering as Third old sister
- Alfred Schreiber as Peter

== Bibliography ==
- Belach, Helga (1986). Henny Porten: Der erste deutsche Filmstar 1890–1960 [Henny Porten: The First German Film Star 1890–1960] (in German). Berlin: Haude und Spener. ISBN 978-3-7759-0280-9.
