= Stradivari (1935 film) =

1935 film directed by Géza von Bolváry

- Directed by: Géza von Bolváry
- Written by: Ernst Marischka
- Produced by: Siegfried Fritz Fromm; Helmut Schreiber
- Starring: Gustav Fröhlich; Sybille Schmitz; Harald Paulsen
- Cinematography: Werner Brandes
- Edited by: Hermann Haller
- Music by: Alois Melichar
- Production company: Boston Film
- Distributed by: Rota-Film
- Release date: 26 August 1935
- Running time: 97 minutes
- Country: Germany
- Language: German

Stradivari is a 1935 German drama film directed by Géza von Bolváry and starring Gustav Fröhlich, Sybille Schmitz and Harald Paulsen.

The film's sets were designed by the art director Emil Hasler. It was shot at the Johannisthal Studios in Berlin. A French-language version Stradivarius produced the same year was also directed by Géza von Bolváry but with a different cast.

== Synopsis ==
In 1914 a Hungarian officer inherits a Stradivarius which is believed to bring bad luck to its owner. He and his Italian fiancée are separated by the First World War, and he is badly wounded.

== Cast ==
- Gustav Fröhlich as Sándor Teleki
- Sybille Schmitz as Maria Belloni
- Harald Paulsen as Imre Berczy
- Hilde Krüger as Irene Kardos
- Albrecht Schoenhals as Dr. Pietro Rossi
- Hans Leibelt as Professor Hoefer
- Aribert Wäscher as Carnetti
- Theodor Loos as Lazarettkommandant
- Edith Linn as Krankenschwester
- Heinrich Schroth as Oberst
- Veit Harlan as Antonio Stradivari
- Fritz Staudte as Nicolo Amati
- Hedda Björnson as Beatrice Amati
- Angelo Ferrari as Italienischer Offizier
- Armin Schweizer as Vilmos, alter Diener
- Armin Münch as Pista, Offiziersbursche
- Paul Rehkopf as Hotelportier
- S.O. Schoening as Fürst Nousinoff
- Marcella Albani as Fürstin Tatjana Nousinoff
- Fritz Kösling as Marquis Chambort

== Bibliography ==
- Noack, Frank. Veit Harlan: The Life and Work of a Nazi Filmmaker. University Press of Kentucky, 2016.
