= Eugen Ortner =

German playwright and writer (1890–1947)

- Born: 26 November 1890; Glaishammer, Bavaria, German Empire
- Died: 19 March 1947 (aged 56); Traunstein, Bavaria, Germany
- Occupation: Writer

Eugen Ortner (1890–1947) was a German playwright and writer. His works include the 1928 tragedy Meier Helmbrecht and an antisemitic stage version of Jud Süß, written to ingratiate himself with the new Nazi regime. He later concentrated on writing historical biographies and novels, including of George Frideric Handel in 1942.

== Bibliography ==
- Noack, Frank. Veit Harlan: The Life and Work of a Nazi Filmmaker. University Press of Kentucky, 2016.
- Schmidt, Alexander. Kultur in Nürnberg 1918–1933: die Weimarer Moderne in der Provinz. Sandberg-Verlag, 2005.
