= Hans Sohnle =

German art director (1895–1976)

- Born: 17 September 1895; Beeskow, Brandenburg, German Empire
- Died: 24 March 1976 (aged 80); Munich, Bavaria, West Germany
- Occupation: Art director
- Years active: 1920-1964 (film)

Hans Sohnle (17 September 1895 – 24 March 1976) was a German art director. He frequently collaborated with Otto Erdmann on set designs.

== Selected filmography ==
- The Loves of Käthe Keller (1919)
- The Woman in Doctor's Garb (1920)
- Kean (1921)
- The Solemn Oath (1921)
- Seafaring Is Necessary (1921)
- The Curse of Silence (1922)
- The Homecoming of Odysseus (1922)
- Two Worlds (1922)
- The Weather Station (1923)
- Horrido (1924)
- Prater (1924)
- The Stolen Professor (1924)
- The Woman in Flames (1924)
- Joyless Street (1925)
- Flight Around the World (1925)
- The Golden Calf (1925)
- Shadows of the Metropolis (1925)
- The Third Squadron (1926)
- The Great Duchess (1926)
- The Poacher (1926)
- Professor Imhof (1926)
- Tea Time in the Ackerstrasse (1926)
- The Pride of the Company (1926)
- The White Slave (1927)
- The City of a Thousand Delights (1927)
- Queen of the Boulevards (1927)
- The Bordello in Rio (1927)
- Light-Hearted Isabel (1927)
- The Impostor (1927)
- The Woman Who Couldn't Say No (1927)
- Orient (1928)
- Who Invented Divorce? (1928)
- Five Anxious Days (1928)
- A Girl with Temperament (1928)
- The Secret Courier (1928)
- The Lady and the Chauffeur (1928)
- The Carousel of Death (1928)
- The Story of a Little Parisian (1928)
- The Veil Dancer (1929)
- Land Without Women (1929)
- The Adjutant of the Czar (1929)
- Only on the Rhine (1930)
- Love in the Ring (1930)
- Road to Rio (1931)
- The Yellow House of King-Fu (1931)
- Marriage with Limited Liability (1931)
- The Mad Bomberg (1932)
- A Night in Paradise (1932)
- Madame Wants No Children (1933)
- The Peak Scaler (1933)
- The Little Crook (1933)
- Inge and the Millions (1933)
- A Day Will Come (1934)
- Just Once a Great Lady (1934)
- One Too Many on Board (1935)
- My Life for Maria Isabella (1935)
- Regine (1935)
- Lessons in Love (1935)
- Escapade (1936)
- A Hoax (1936)
- A Woman of No Importance (1936)
- Fridericus (1937)
- The Impossible Mister Pitt (1938)
- In the Name of the People (1939)
- The Leghorn Hat (1939)
- The Little Residence (1942)
- The Endless Road (1943)
- Don't Talk to Me About Love (1943)
- The Song of the Nightingale (1944)
- Law of Love (1949)
- The Disturbed Wedding Night (1950)
- Who Is This That I Love? (1950)
- The Secret of a Marriage (1951)
- The Exchange (1952)
- Fanfare of Marriage (1953)
- Must We Get Divorced? (1953)
- The Little Town Will Go to Sleep (1954)
- A Girl Without Boundaries (1955)
- Reaching for the Stars (1955)
- Two Bavarians in St. Pauli (1956)
- Between Munich and St. Pauli (1957)

== Bibliography ==
- Chandler, Charlotte. Marlene: Marlene Dietrich, A Personal Biography. Simon and Schuster, 2011.
