= Gregori Chmara =

Ukrainian-born stage and film actor

Grigori Chmara
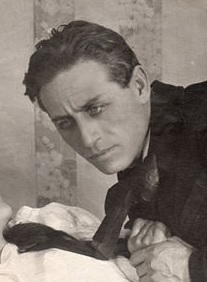
- Gregori Chmara in 1918
- Born: Gregori Mikhailovich Chmara; 29 July 1878; Poltava, Russian Empire
- Died: 3 February 1970 (aged 91); Paris, France
- Occupation: Actor
- Years active: 1910–1970
- Partner: Asta Nielsen (1923–1936)

Gregori Mikhailovich Chmara (Ukrainian: Григорій Михайлович Хмара, Russian: Григорий Михайлович Хмара; 29 July 1878 – 3 February 1970) was a Ukrainian-born stage and film actor whose career spanned six decades.

== Biography ==
Born in Poltava, Russian Empire (now Ukraine), Chmara began his career in 1910 at the Moscow Art Theater. He made several films in Russia and following the Russian Revolution he went to Germany where he performed as a singer. After meeting the Danish actress Asta Nielsen, the two fell in love and lived together, but never married.

In 1930, he began appearing in Polish and French films, as well as German films. His last film role was in the Stellio Lorenzi-directed French television film adaptation of Fyodor Dostoevsky novel Crime and Punishment (Crime et châtiment), filmed in 1970 and released in 1971. Chmara died in France in 1970.

== Selected filmography ==
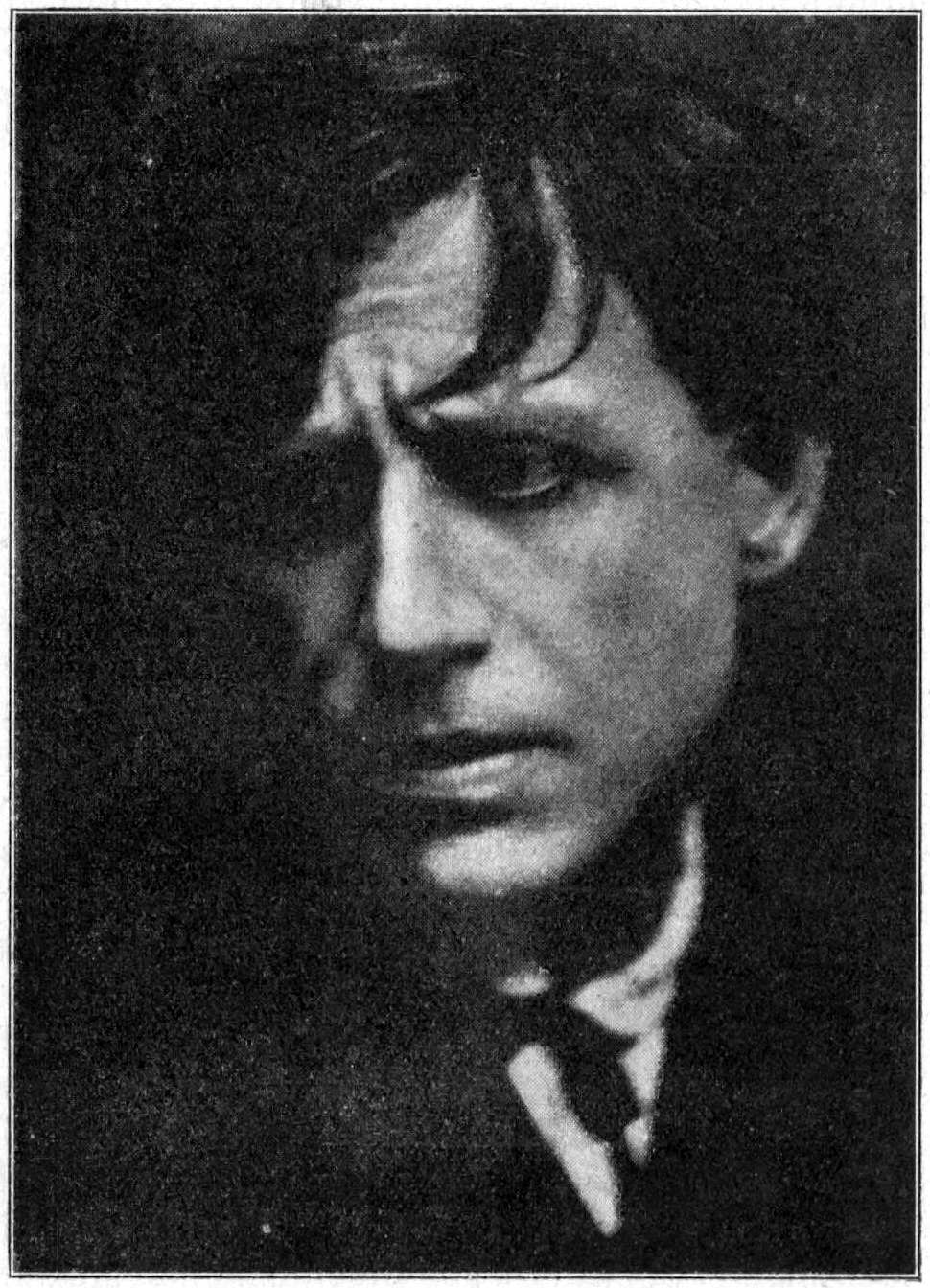
Gregori Chmara as Raskolnikow, 1923

- Raskolnikow (1923) as Rodion Raskolnikow
- I.N.R.I. (1923) as Jesus Christ
- The House by the Sea (1924) as Enrico
- Hedda Gabler (1925) as Eilert Lövborg
- Joyless Street (1925) as Pjotr Orlow
- Athletes (1925) as Dr. Kürer
- Living Buddhas (1925) as Jebsun
- The Case of Prosecutor M (1928) as Poljarin
- Orient (1928)
- Rasputin (1928) as Grigori Rasputin
- A Strong Man (1929)
- The Schlemihl (1931) as Fürst Janitscheff
- The Man Who Murdered (1931) as Prince Cernuwicz
- The Black Hussar (1932) as Prince Potovski
- Man Without a Name (1932)
- The Tsar's Diamond (1932) as Falscher Großfürst
- Peter Voss, Thief of Millions (1932) as the pasha
- A Friend Will Come Tonight (1946) as the monocle-wearing German officer
- Mission in Tangier (1949) as the Russian singer
- Mannequins of Paris (1956) as Boris
- Elena and Her Men (1956) as Elena's servant
- A Bomb for a Dictator (1957) as the inquisitive passenger
- Mon pote le gitan (1959) as Grandpa
- Arsène Lupin Versus Arsène Lupin (1962) as Basile
- Paris Does Not Exist (1969) as the old man

== Bibliography ==
- Jung, Uli & Schatzberg, Walter. Beyond Caligari: The Films of Robert Wiene. Berghahn Books, 1999.
