= Mother and Child (1924 film) =

1924 film directed by Carl Froelich

- Directed by: Carl Froelich
- Written by: Friedrich Hebbel (story); Robert Liebmann; Walter Supper
- Produced by: Carl Froelich
- Starring: Henny Porten; Friedrich Kayßler; Wilhelm Dieterle; Erna Morena
- Cinematography: Willy Gaebel; Gustave Preiss
- Production company: European Film Alliance
- Distributed by: Bayerische Film
- Release date: 22 October 1924
- Country: Germany
- Languages: Silent; German intertitles

Mother and Child (German: Mutter und Kind) is a 1924 German silent drama film directed by Carl Froelich and starring Henny Porten, Friedrich Kayßler, and Wilhelm Dieterle. It was shot at the EFA Studios in Berlin. It was remade in 1934 as a sound film of the same title also starring Porten.

== Cast ==
- Henny Porten as Köchin Lene
- Friedrich Kayßler as Senator Hansen
- Wilhelm Dieterle as Kutscher Christian
- Erna Morena as Renate, Senator Hansen's Frau
- Willy Fritsch as Werner, Senator Hansen's Neffe
- Wilhelm Diegelmann as Hausarzt
- Arnold Rieck as Schuster
- Hanne Brinkmann as Schusterin
- Hans Land as Pastor
- Loni Nest as Kind

== Bibliography ==
- Bock, Hans-Michael & Bergfelder, Tim. The Concise CineGraph. Encyclopedia of German Cinema. Berghahn Books, 2009.
