= Pawns of Passion =

1928 German film

- Olga Chekhova and Hans Stüwe
- Directed by: Wiktor Biegański; Carmine Gallone
- Written by: Carmine Gallone; Norbert Falk
- Starring: Olga Chekhova; Harry Frank; Hans Stüwe; Henri Baudin
- Cinematography: Victor Arménise; Mutz Greenbaum
- Music by: Werner Schmidt-Boelcke
- Production company: Erda-Film
- Distributed by: Deutsche Universal
- Release date: 8 August 1928
- Country: Germany
- Languages: Silent; German intertitles

Pawns of Passion (German: Marter der Liebe) is a 1928 German silent drama film directed by Wiktor Biegański and Carmine Gallone and starring Olga Chekhova, Harry Frank and Hans Stüwe. The film was released in the United States in 1929. The film is also known by several other alternative titles including Liebeshölle.

== Cast ==
- Olga Chekhova as Ala Suminska
- Harry Frank as Ihr Mann, Offizier
- Hans Stüwe as Bruno Bronek, Maler
- Henri Baudin as Pierre, Offizier
- Oreste Bilancia as Jean, Bildhauer
- Helmuth Krauß as Viktor, Maler
- Angelo Ferrari as Robert, Maler
- Lola Josane as Lolotte, Modell
- Sofia Szuberla as Alas Kind
- Max Maximilian as Ein Bauer
- Sylvia Torf as Eine Bäuerin
- Diana Karenne
- Sidney Suberly

== Bibliography ==
- Helker, Renata. Die Tschechows: Wege in die Moderne. Deutsches Theatermuseum München, 2005.
- Street, Sarah. Transatlantic Crossings: British Feature Films in the United States. Continuum, 2002.
