= Their Son =

1929 film directed by Gennaro Righelli

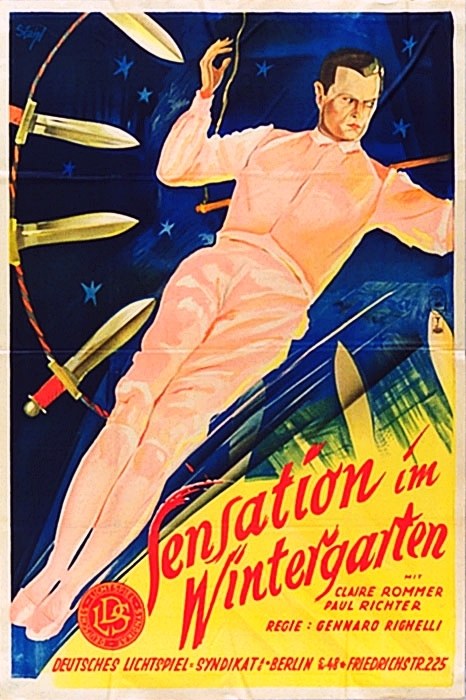
- Directed by: Gennaro Righelli
- Screenplay by: Angus MacPhail
- Based on: Their Son by A. Elton
- Produced by: Lothar Stark
- Starring: Gaston Jacquet; Paul Richter
- Cinematography: Max Greene
- Music by: Pasquale Perris
- Production company: Lothar Stark-Film
- Distributed by: Deutsche Lichtspiel-Syndikat
- Release date: 1929
- Country: Germany
- Languages: Silent film German intertitles

Their Son (also known as Sensation im Wintergarten) is a 1929 silent film directed by Gennaro Righelli.

== Synopsis ==
The son of the Countess Mensdorf runs away when he can no longer stand her relationship with the Baron Von Mallock. The son becomes the famous trapeze artist Frattani, and after many years he returns home and meets Madeleine, a young dancer. They fall in love and he wants to give up the circus and have a normal life. But when he returns to his mother he finds she doesn't recognize him. The Baron is unhappy with his return and uses criminal means to get rid of him, but in trying to kill Frattani the Baron ultimately loses his own life. The young couple look forward to a happy life together.
