= Road to Rio (1931 film) =

1931 film directed by Manfred Noa

- Directed by: Manfred Noa
- Written by: Bobby E. Lüthge; Margarete-Maria Langen
- Starring: Maria Matray; Oskar Homolka; Oskar Marion; Senta Söneland
- Cinematography: Willy Goldberger; Akos Farkas
- Music by: Artur Guttmann; Friedrich Hollaender; Stefan Rényi
- Production company: Lothar Stark-Film
- Distributed by: Süd-Film
- Release date: 15 January 1931
- Running time: 82 minutes
- Country: Germany
- Language: German

Road to Rio (German: Der Weg nach Rio) is a 1931 German crime film directed by Manfred Noa and starring Maria Matray, Oskar Homolka and Oskar Marion. It premiered on 15 January 1931. It was shot at the Babelsberg Studios in Potsdam. The film's sets were designed by the art directors Hans Sohnle and Otto Erdmann.

== Cast ==
- Maria Matray as Inge Weber - das Opfer
- Oskar Homolka as Ricardo
- Oskar Marion as Karl Plattke
- Senta Söneland as Berta Andersen, Hotel Manager
- Louis Ralph as Felice
- Hertha von Walther as Marietta
- Kurt Gerron as Director for Casino
- Julius Falkenstein as Muchica, Pantagenbesitzer
- Eduard von Winterstein as Polizeikommissär
- Alexa von Porembsky as Die Unerfahrene
- Eugen Rex
- Maria Forescu
- Ernst Reicher
- Gustav Püttjer
- Karl Platen
- Fritz Greiner
- Erwin van Roy
- Georg Schmieter
- Loo Hardy
- Angelo Ferrari
- Aruth Wartan

== Bibliography ==
- Grange, William. Cultural Chronicle of the Weimar Republic. Scarecrow Press, 2008.
