= Grete Mosheim =

German actress (1905–1986)

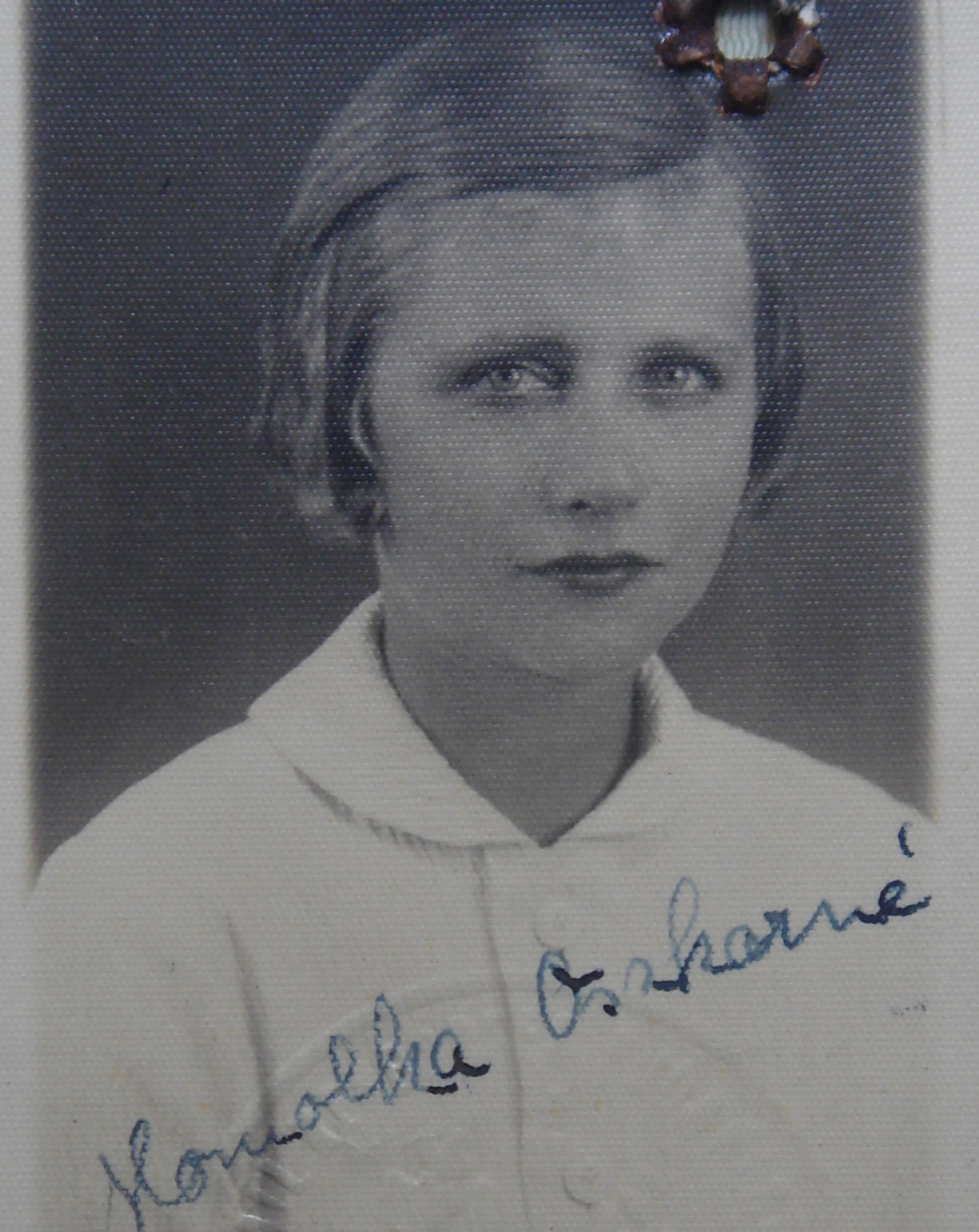
- Mosheim's 1936 Hungarian passport photo
- Born: Margarete Emma Dorothea Mosheim; 8 January 1905; Berlin, Germany
- Died: 29 December 1986 (aged 81); New York City, US
- Occupation: Actress
- Spouses: Oskar Homolka (m. 1928; div. 1937) Howard Gould (m. 1937; div. 1948) Robert Cooper (divorced)

Margarete Emma Dorothea "Grete" Mosheim (8 January 1905 – 29 December 1986) was a German film, theatre, and television actress.

== Early life ==
Mosheim was born in Berlin, Germany, on 8 January 1905, the daughter of a Jewish man, Markus Mosheim (1868–1956) and his non-Jewish wife, Clara Mosheim née Hilger (1875–1970). Her sister was actress Lore Mosheim, who appeared in at least nine movies.

== Theatre ==
Mosheim started her acting career at the age of 17 and was a member of Deutsches Theater, Berlin from 1922 to 1931. She began studying at Max Reinhardt's School of Drama under Berthold Held in early 1922, alongside Marlene Dietrich.

Mosheim became established under Max Reinhardt, and in 1925 he gave her the chance to substitute in the play Der sprechende Affe by René Fauchois when the female lead became ill. Mosheim learned the difficult role from Albert Bassermann in just 24 hours and became a superstar almost overnight. Until 1933, when she went to London to escape Adolf Hitler's rise to power, she was pre-eminent in the Berlin theatre scene. She performed in a wide variety of roles, being equally at home in drama and comedy. She also appeared in musical revues and recorded songs by Friedrich Hollaender and others.

After intensive study, she mastered English well enough to appear in Two Share a Dwelling by Alice Campbell in London in 1935. She appeared again on stage in Germany from 1952 on, but did not return to films – other than in a few TV roles – until her appearance as the grandmother in Moritz, Dear Moritz in 1978.

== Films ==
Mosheim appeared in numerous German films, mostly silent movies, starting with Michael in 1924. Until she fled Germany in 1933, she starred in many films, including Dreyfus (1930) and Yorck (1931). In 1935, she starred in the British film Car of Dreams. In 1976, she appeared in Rosa von Praunheim's film Underground and Emigrants.

== Personal life ==
Mosheim was married three times: to actor Oskar Homolka in Berlin (1928–1933), to industrialist Howard Gould in London (1937–1948) and to journalist Robert Cooper, who was a correspondent for The Times. She had no children.

== Death ==
Mosheim died from cancer in New York City on 29 December 1986, aged 81.

== Honours ==
In 1984, she was awarded the Order of Merit of the Federal Republic of Germany, Germany's highest civilian award.

== Partial filmography ==
- Michael (Germany 1924)
- An Artist of Life (Germany 1925)
- Derby (Germany 1926)
- The Flames Lie (Germany 1926)
- The Fiddler of Florence (Germany 1926)
- Young Blood (Germany 1926)
- Assassination (Germany 1927)
- The Awakening of Woman (Germany 1927)
- The Sporck Battalion (Germany 1927)
- Carnival Magic (Germany 1927)
- Die Siebzehnjährigen (Germany 1928)
- The Little Slave (Germany 1928)
- The Green Alley (Germany 1928)
- Cyanide (Germany 1930)
- Dreyfus (Germany 1930)
- The Murderer Dimitri Karamazov (Germany 1931)
- Yorck (Germany 1931)
- Poor as a Church Mouse (Germany 1931)
- Car of Dreams (UK 1935)
- Underground and Emigrants (US 1976)
- Moritz, Dear Moritz (Germany 1978)
