= Lothar Stark =

German Flim Producer

- Born: 5 September 1876; Klein Strehlitz, Silesia, Prussia, German Empire
- Died: 31 March 1944 (aged 67); Stockholm, Sweden
- Occupation: Film producer
- Years active: 1913–1936

Lothar Stark (5 September 1876 – 31 March 1944) was a German film producer. Stark was originally a journalist, but was brought into the film industry by the tycoon Paul Davidson. Stark worked as a distributor and worked then as an independent producer during the First World War and the Weimar Republic, founding his own company Lothar Stark-Film. Following the Nazi takeover in 1933, he faced increasing difficulties. In 1933 when evidence of his Jewish background was discovered, Stark went into exile in Copenhagen. Later he also went to London. He tried to produce new films there, but was unable to secure funding. Then he returned to Denmark, which was then invaded by Germany in 1940. In 1943 Stark, along with the majority of the Danish Jewish population, managed to escape to Sweden.

== Selected filmography ==
- The Tales of Hoffman (1916)
- Wrath of the Seas (1926)
- The False Prince (1927)
- The White Slave (1927)
- The City of a Thousand Delights (1927)
- The Carousel of Death (1928)
- Orient (1928)
- Their Son (1929)
- Only on the Rhine (1930)

== Bibliography ==
- Weniger, Kay. 'Es wird im Leben dir mehr genommen als gegeben ...' Lexikon der aus Deutschland und Österreich emigrierten Filmschaffenden 1933 bis 1945: Eine Gesamtübersicht. ACABUS Verlag, 2011.
