= Grandstand for General Staff =

Grandstand for General Staff (German: Der Feldherrnhügel) may refer to:

- Grandstand for General Staff (play), a work by Alexander Roda Roda
- Grandstand for General Staff (1926 film), an Austrian-German silent film directed by Erich Schönfelder
- Grandstand for General Staff (1932 film), a German film directed by Eugen Thiele
- Grandstand for General Staff (1953 film), an Austrian film directed by Ernst Marischka
