= The Fake (play) =

- Original language: English
- Written by: Frederick Lonsdale
- Genre: drama

Premiere
- Place: Apollo Theatre, Broadway

The Fake is a 1924 play by the British writer Frederick Lonsdale. It was staged at the Apollo Theatre in the West End with a cast that included Godfrey Tearle, Franklyn Bellamy and Allan Jeayes. Unlike most of his successful plays, generally farce-like comedies, this was intended as a serious drama although it contains a happy ending. It ran for 211 performances.

When the play transferred to Broadway, Claudette Colbert was originally cast as the female lead, but was replaced by Frieda Inescort.

== Film adaptation ==
In 1927 it was turned into a British silent film The Fake directed by Georg Jacoby and starring Henry Edwards, Elga Brink, Juliette Compton and Miles Mander.

== Bibliography ==
- Dick, Bernard F. Claudette Colbert: She Walked in Beauty. University Press of Mississippi, 2008.
- Donaldson, Frances. Freddy Lonsdale. Bloomsbury Publishing, 2011.
