= Marriage in Trouble =

1929 film directed by Richard Oswald

- French-language poster
- Directed by: Richard Oswald
- Written by: Georges Antequil (novel); Herbert Juttke; Georg C. Klaren
- Produced by: Leo Meyer; Seymour Nebenzal
- Starring: Elga Brink; Walter Rilla; Evelyn Holt; Alfred Abel
- Cinematography: Friedl Behn-Grund
- Production company: Nero Film
- Distributed by: Vereinigte Star-Film
- Release date: 6 December 1929
- Running time: 91 minutes
- Country: Germany
- Languages: Silent; German intertitles

Marriage in Trouble (German: Ehe in Not) is a 1929 German silent drama film directed by Richard Oswald and starring Elga Brink, Walter Rilla and Evelyn Holt. It was shot at the EFA Studios in Berlin. The film's art direction was by Franz Schroedter. A man considers leaving his wife for another woman, but eventually decides against it. The film was based on a French novel by Georges Antequil.

== Cast ==
- Elga Brink as Frau
- Walter Rilla as Mann
- Evelyn Holt as Mädchen
- Hannele Meierzak as Kind
- Alfred Abel as Lawyer
- Fritz Kampers as Cafétier
- Otto Wallburg
- Willy Rosen
- Trude Berliner
- Elsa Wagner

== Bibliography ==
- Prawer, S.S. Between Two Worlds: The Jewish Presence in German and Austrian Film, 1910–1933. Berghahn Books, 2005.
