= Fear (1954 film) =

- Belgian theatrical release poster
- Directed by: Roberto Rossellini
- Written by: Roberto Rossellini; Sergio Amidei; Franz von Treuberg
- Based on: Fear by Stefan Zweig
- Produced by: Herman Millakowsky
- Starring: Ingrid Bergman; Mathias Wieman; Renate Mannhardt; Kurt Kreuger
- Cinematography: Carlo Carlini; Heinz Schnackertz
- Edited by: Jolanda Benvenuti; Walter Boos
- Music by: Renzo Rossellini
- Distributed by: Minerva Film
- Release dates: 5 November 1954 (West Germany); 18 February 1955 (Italy)
- Running time: 83 minutes
- Countries: West Germany; Italy
- Languages: German; English

Fear (Italian: La Paura or German: Angst) is a 1954 German-Italian drama film directed by Roberto Rossellini and starring his wife, Ingrid Bergman. It is loosely based on Stefan Zweig 1925 novella Fear. Rossellini created it because he wanted to explore the reconstruction of Germany from both a material and moral standpoint ten years after making his previous German film Germany, Year Zero. The film is noirish with aspects reminiscent of Hitchcock and German Expressionism.

== Plot ==
Irene is the wife of a pharmaceutics manager. When she decides to leave her lover, she finds herself being blackmailed by an extortionist. She does everything in her power to conceal the truth, without knowing that her husband already knows everything and is sadistically enjoying the situation.

== Cast ==
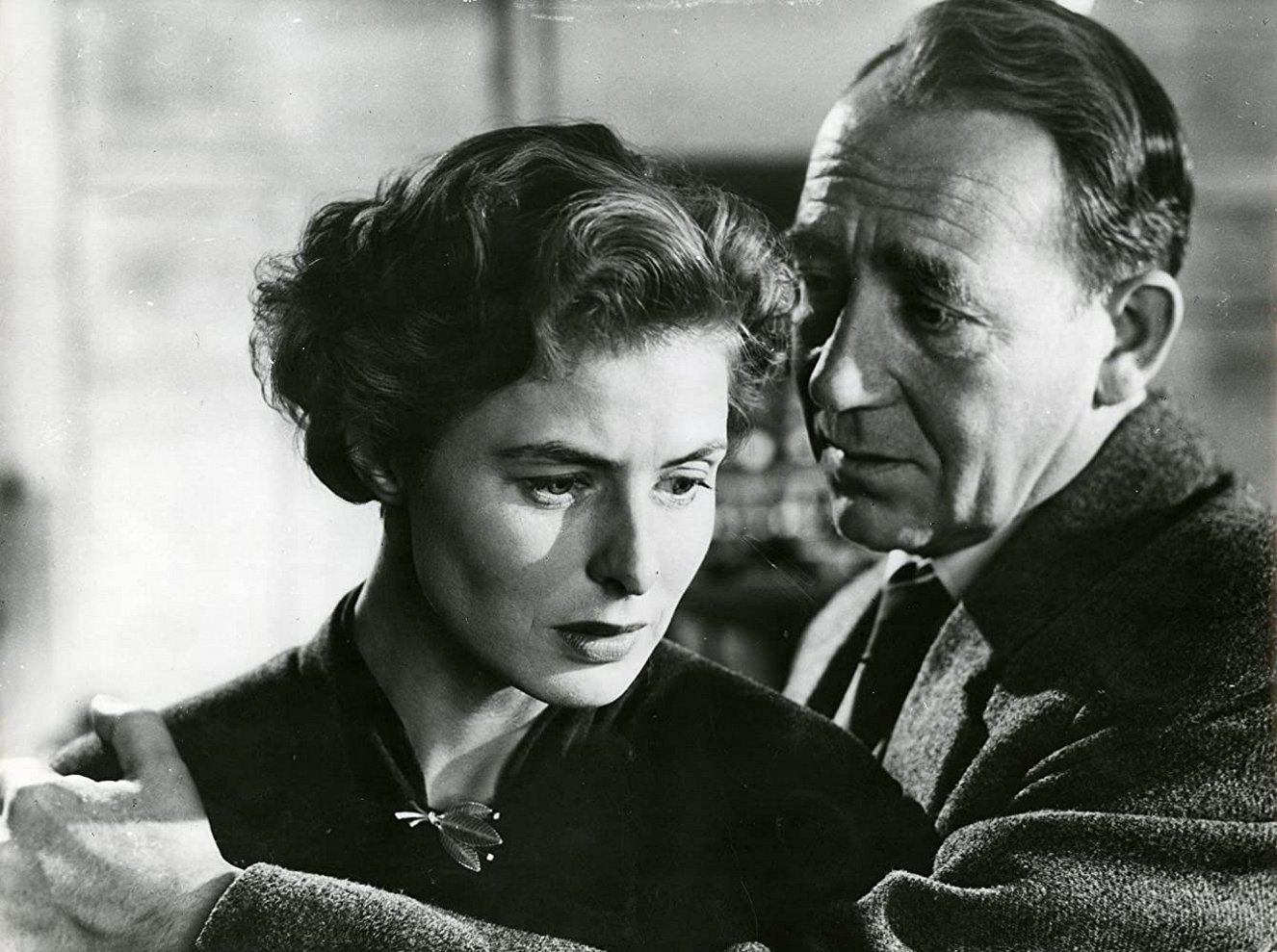
Ingrid Bergman and Mathias Wieman in Fear

- Ingrid Bergman as Irene Wagner
- Mathias Wieman as Professor Albert Wagner
- Renate Mannhardt as Luisa Vidor, alias Johann Schultze
- Kurt Kreuger as Erich Baumann
- Elise Aulinger as Haushaelterin
- Edith Schultze-Westrum
- Steffi Stroux (credited as Steffi Struck)
- Annelore Wied
- Klaus Kinski as Cabaret Performer

== Production ==
Fear was shot simultaneously in English and German language and released as Fear in the international, English-language version and as Angst in Germany.

== Reception ==
On the review aggregator website Rotten Tomatoes, the film has a 41% approval rating based on 3 critics' reviews.

Fear received one vote in the Sight and Sound 2022 poll to determine the greatest films of all time.

The film did not do well when it was released in Italy and Germany. Consequently, the Italian distributor edited the film (originally titled La Paura in the Italian-dubbed version) and re-released it as Non credo più all'amore. In this edited version, a fishing scene is shortened and an explanatory narration is added to two silent scenes. In addition, the ending was changed from a scene showing Bergman attempting suicide to a scene showing her family in the countryside, after Bergman had left her husband, living on for the sake of her children.

== The Rossellini Project ==
This initiative involves 10 films by Roberto Rossellini that are being digitally restored and will then be promoted internationally. Carrying out the restoration work are Cinecittà Luce-Filmitalia, the Cineteca di Bologna, the Centro Sperimentale di Cinematografia, and the Coproduction Office.

Fear is one of the ten films being restored. The others are: Rome, Open City (Roma città aperta), Paisan (Paisà), Germany Year Zero (Germania anno zero), L’amore, Stromboli (Stromboli terra di Dio), The Machine that Kills Bad People (La Macchina ammazzacattivi), Journey to Italy (Viaggio in Italia), India: Matri Bhumi, and Interview with Salvador Allende (Intervista a Salvador Allende: La forza e la ragione).

== North American TV release ==
On 15 March 2013, Turner Classic Movies broadcast Fear for the first time on TV in North America.

== See also ==
Other film adaptations of Stefan Zweig's novella are:

- Angst (1928)
- La Peur (1936)
