= Intoxicated Love =

1927 film

- Swedish poster
- German: Liebe im Rausch
- Directed by: Georg Jacoby
- Written by: Alfred Schirokauer
- Produced by: Georg Jacoby
- Starring: Georg Alexander; Stewart Rome; Elga Brink
- Cinematography: Emil Schünemann; Károly Vass
- Music by: Pasquale Perris
- Production company: Georg Jacoby-Film
- Distributed by: Matador-Film
- Release date: April 1927
- Country: Germany
- Languages: Silent; German intertitles

Intoxicated Love (German: Liebe im Rausch) is a 1927 German silent film directed by Georg Jacoby and starring Elga Brink, Stewart Rome and Georg Alexander. It was shot at the EFA Studios in Berlin. The film's art direction was by Franz Schroedter and Hermann Warm.

== Cast ==
- Elga Brink as Elga Lee
- Stewart Rome as Jack Kent
- Georg Alexander as Richard Courday
- Marietta Millner as Harriet Milton
- Jack Trevor as Robert Elliot
- Karl Meinhardt as Fu-Chow
- Nien Soen Ling as Sein Diener
- Frida Richard as Wirtschafterin
