= Accommodations for Marriage =

1926 film

- German: Das Gasthaus zur Ehe
- Directed by: Georg Jacoby
- Written by: Gerd Briese; Ruth Goetz
- Based on: Accommodations for Marriage by Fedor von Zobeltitz
- Starring: Elga Brink; Georg Alexander; Kurt Vespermann; Ida Wüst
- Cinematography: Otto Kanturek
- Production company: Domo-Film
- Distributed by: Süd-Film
- Release date: 18 March 1926
- Country: Germany
- Languages: Silent; German intertitles

Accommodations for Marriage (German: Das Gasthaus zur Ehe) is a 1926 German silent comedy film directed by Georg Jacoby and starring Elga Brink, Georg Alexander and Kurt Vespermann.The film was shot at the EFA Studios in Berlin. It was based on a novel by Fedor von Zobeltitz. The film premiered in Berlin on 18 March 1926.

== Cast ==
- Elga Brink
- Georg Alexander
- Kurt Vespermann
- Ida Wüst
- Mary Kid
- Lotte Lorring
- Livio Pavanelli
- Rosa Valetti
- Hugo Werner-Kahle
