= Women on the Edge (1929 film) =

1929 film

- Inge Landgut and Elga Brink
- Directed by: Georg Jacoby
- Written by: Emanuel Alfieri; Johannes Brandt
- Starring: Gustav Diessl; Elga Brink; Inge Landgut; André Roanne
- Cinematography: Franz Planer
- Production company: Ilma Film
- Distributed by: Bavaria Film
- Release date: 16 October 1929
- Running time: 90 minutes
- Country: Germany
- Languages: Silent; German intertitles

Women on the Edge (German: Frauen am Abgrund) is a 1929 German silent drama film directed by Georg Jacoby and starring Gustav Diessl, Elga Brink and Inge Landgut. It was shot at the Halensee Studios in Berlin. The film's sets were designed by the art director Max Heilbronner. Paul Hörbiger notably played the supporting role of a Jewish impresario Siegfried Nürnberger.

== Cast ==
- Gustav Diessl as Robert Stevens
- Elga Brink as Maria Stevens
- Inge Landgut as Inge, a child
- André Roanne as Harry Bernd
- Valerie Boothby as Lilly Bernd
- Livio Pavanelli as Mario Giorgini, a kammersänger
- Paul Hörbiger as Siegfried Nürnberger, an impresario
- Ibolya Szekely as Rosy, a stenotypist
- Arthur Duarte

== Bibliography ==
- Prawer, S.S. Between Two Worlds: The Jewish Presence in German and Austrian Film, 1910-1933. Berghahn Books, 2005.
