= Nameless Woman =

1927 film

- Film poster
- German: Die Frau ohne Namen
- Directed by: Georg Jacoby
- Written by: Hans Brennert
- Produced by: Georg Jacoby
- Starring: Georg Alexander; Jack Trevor; Elga Brink
- Cinematography: Emil Schünemann; Károly Vass
- Music by: Willy Schmidt-Gentner
- Production company: Georg Jacoby-Film
- Distributed by: Matador-Film
- Release dates: 27 January 1927 (Part I); 3 February 1927 (Part II)
- Country: Germany
- Languages: Silent; German intertitles

Nameless Woman (German: Die Frau ohne Namen) is a 1927 German silent adventure film directed by Georg Jacoby and starring Elga Brink, Jack Trevor and Georg Alexander. It was released in two parts. A pair of American journalists embark on a world-wide tour in which they enjoy many adventures.

It was shot at the EFA Studios in Berlin and on location in the United States and East Asia. The film's sets were designed by Franz Schroedter and Hermann Warm.

== Cast ==
- Elga Brink as Violett Jeffrey
- Jack Trevor as Frank Milton
- Georg Alexander as Bobby Dix
- Marietta Millner as Vivian Ried
- Stewart Rome as Bareira
- Georg Baselt as editor
- Willi Schaeffers as head clerk
- Paul Biensfeldt as consul
- Nien Soen Ling as the Chinese
- Jakob Tiedtke as a rich Korean
- Magnus Stifter
