= Should We Get Married? =

1925 film directed by Manfred Noa

- Max Landa and Olga Chekhova
- Directed by: Manfred Noa
- Written by: Robert Liebmann
- Produced by: Hanns Lippmann
- Starring: Vilma Bánky; Angelo Ferrari; Max Landa
- Cinematography: Károly Vass
- Music by: Eduard Prasch
- Production company: Gloria-Film
- Distributed by: UFA
- Release date: 9 October 1925
- Country: Germany
- Languages: Silent; German intertitles

Should We Get Married? (German: Soll man heiraten?) is a 1925 German silent film directed by Manfred Noa and starring Vilma Bánky, Angelo Ferrari and Max Landa.

The film's art direction was by Hermann Warm.

== Cast ==
In alphabetical order

- Vilma Bánky
- Olga Chekhova
- Angelo Ferrari
- Max Landa
- Toni Tetzlaff
- Ludwig Ujvari

== Bibliography ==
- Schildgen, Rachel A. More Than A Dream: Rediscovering the Life and Films of Vilma Banky. 1921 PVG Publishing, 2010.
