= The Island of Forbidden Kisses =

1927 film

- Film poster
- German: Die Insel der verbotenen Küsse
- Directed by: Georg Jacoby
- Written by: Alfred Schirokauer
- Produced by: Georg Jacoby
- Starring: Stewart Rome; Marietta Millner; Elga Brink
- Cinematography: Emil Schünemann; Károly Vass
- Production company: Georg Jacoby-Film
- Distributed by: Matador-Film
- Release date: 21 February 1927
- Country: Germany
- Languages: Silent; German intertitles

The Island of Forbidden Kisses (German: Die Insel der verbotenen Küsse) is a 1927 German silent adventure film directed by Georg Jacoby and starring Stewart Rome, Marietta Millner and Elga Brink. The interiors were shot at the EFA Studios in Berlin. The film's art direction was by Franz Schroedter and Hermann Warm.

== Cast ==
In alphabetical order

- Georg Alexander
- Georg Baselt
- Henry Bender
- Elga Brink
- Georg Jacoby
- Margarete Kupfer
- Marietta Millner
- Stewart Rome
- Jack Trevor
