= The Ride in the Sun =

1926 film

- German: Der Ritt in die Sonne
- Directed by: Georg Jacoby
- Written by: Paul Rosenhayn (novel); Hans Brennert; Georg Jacoby
- Produced by: Leo Meyer
- Starring: Livio Pavanelli; Paul Heidemann; Hugo Werner-Kahle
- Cinematography: Otto Kanturek
- Music by: Felix Bartsch
- Production company: Domo-Strauß-Film
- Distributed by: Filmhaus Bruckmann
- Release date: 28 January 1926
- Country: Germany
- Languages: Silent; German intertitles

The Ride in the Sun (German: Der Ritt in die Sonne) is a 1926 German silent film directed by Georg Jacoby and starring Livio Pavanelli, Paul Heidemann and Hugo Werner-Kahle.

The film's sets were designed by art director Walter Reimann.

== Plot ==
The American self-made billionaire Cornelius Vandergould is so incredibly wealthy that more people claim to be his friends than is even possible or desirable for him. His father was friends with the nobleman Marquis d'Orsay, so it was always understood that Cornelius would one day marry his daughter, Dina. Since Cornelius now believes that everyone is only after his money, he decides to test the young woman first and introduces himself to her as a certain Fritz Jacobsen. During his journey to meet his prospective bride, the supposed Fritz encounters two shady men who remark on his striking resemblance to the American magnate and persuade him to impersonate Cornelius Vandergould, so now Cornelius is playing Cornelius.

== Cast ==
- Livio Pavanelli as Fritz Jacobsen
- Paul Heidemann as Jonny Reimers
- Hugo Werner-Kahle as Hieronymi
- Hans Mierendorff as Marquis d'Orsay
- Elga Brink as Dina
- Elena Lunda as Bianca Bell
- Henry Bender as Richwald, the banker
