= Angst (1928 film) =

1928 German-British film by Hans Steinhoff

- Directed by: Hans Steinhoff
- Written by: Stefan Zweig (novel); Ernst B. Fey
- Produced by: Georg Jacoby
- Starring: Gustav Fröhlich; Henry Edwards; Elga Brink
- Cinematography: Karl Puth
- Production company: Orplid-Film
- Distributed by: Messtro-Orplid
- Release date: 6 August 1928
- Countries: Germany; United Kingdom
- Languages: Silent; German intertitles

Angst is a 1928 German-British silent drama film directed by Hans Steinhoff and starring Gustav Fröhlich, Henry Edwards and Elga Brink. It is based on the 1925 novella Fear by Stefan Zweig. The film was a co-production between Germany and Britain, with the British star Edwards included to give the work greater commercial appeal in the British Isles.

== Cast ==
- Gustav Fröhlich
- Henry Edwards as Henry Duhan
- Elga Brink as Inge Duhan
- Bruno Kastner as Herr Born
- Margit Manstad as Frau Claire
- Vivian Gibson
- Valerie Boothby
- Inge Landgut

== Plot ==
Inge Duhan (Brink), a wealthy wife, begins conducting an affair, only to find herself blackmailed by another woman.

== See also ==
- La Peur (1936)
- Fear (1954)

== Bibliography ==
- Bergfelder, Tim; Harris, Sue; Street, Sarah (2007). Film Architecture and the Transnational Imagination: Set Design in 1930s European Cinema. Amsterdam University Press. ISBN 978-90-5356-984-9.
