= Frigga Braut =

German actress (1889–1975)

- Born: 18 September 1889; Hamburg, German Empire
- Died: 13 February 1975 (aged 85); Düsseldorf, West Germany
- Occupation: Actress
- Years active: 1925–1949 (film)

Frigga Braut (18 September 1889 – 13 February 1975) was a German stage and film actress.

== Selected filmography ==
- Cock of the Roost (1925)
- Slums of Berlin (1925)
- Malice (1926)
- We'll Meet Again in the Heimat (1926)
- Tea Time in the Ackerstrasse (1926)
- Heaven on Earth (1927)
- The Bordellos of Algiers (1927)
- Aftermath (1927)
- Adam and Eve (1928)
- Anesthesia (1929)
- Scandalous Eva (1930)
- The Stolen Face (1930)
- Who Takes Love Seriously? (1931)
- Paprika (1932)
- Madonna in Chains (1949)

== Bibliography ==
- Rentschler, Eric. The Films of G.W. Pabst: An Extraterritorial Cinema. Rutgers University Press, 1990.
