= Cock of the Roost =

1925 film

- German: Der Hahn im Korb
- Directed by: Georg Jacoby
- Written by: Alfred Schirokauer; Reinhold Schünzel
- Starring: Reinhold Schünzel; Elga Brink; Maly Delschaft
- Cinematography: Otto Kanturek
- Production company: Domo-Film
- Distributed by: Westfalia-Film
- Release date: 12 April 1925
- Running time: 97 minutes
- Country: Germany
- Languages: Silent; German intertitles

Cock of the Roost (German: Der Hahn im Korb) is a 1925 German silent comedy film directed by Georg Jacoby and starring Reinhold Schünzel, Elga Brink and Maly Delschaft. The film's sets were designed by the art director Walter Reimann.

== Synopsis ==
In a small, provincial town the clumsy young Peter Abendrot dreams of being the "cock of the roost" and enjoying success amongst the woman of the town. However, he is scorned until an unexpected inheritance from an American uncle suddenly makes him very wealthy. The mother's of the town now all want their daughters to marry him, but he decides to head for the capital Berlin, believing he can now set his sights higher. In the capital he is snared by Jutta, the daughter of a banker, whose father desires to get his hands on the young man's wealth.

== Cast ==
- Reinhold Schünzel as Peter Abendrot
- Elga Brink as Käthe
- Maly Delschaft as Emma
- Frida Richard as Frau Abnendrot
- William Dieterle as Anton
- Sig Arno as Onkel Eli
- Harry Hardt as Lieblich
- Hugo Werner-Kahle as Oberspritzmeister
- Sophie Pagay as Oberspritzmeisters Frau
- Olly Orska as Marie
- Henry Bender as Gastwirt
- Paula Eberty as Frau Gastwirt
- Gyula Szöreghy as Bürgermeister
- Frigga Braut as Bürgermeisters Frau
- Annette Benson as Olga, Bürgermeisters Tochter
- Emmy Wyda as Lehrerin
- Rudolf Meinhard-Jünger as Briefträger
- Max Zilzer as Gemeindediener
- Max Winter as pastor
- Karl Harbacher as Lehrer
- F. W. Schröder-Schrom as Dr. Gerlach
- Hans Mierendorff as Romberg
- Margarete Kupfer as Frau Romberg
- Tamara Geva as Jutta
- Antonie Jaeckel as Zimmervermieterin
- Tamara Karsavina
- Paul Morgan as Bureauvorsteher

== Bibliography ==
- Dyer, Richard & Vincendeau, Ginette. Popular European Cinema. Routledge, 2013.
