= Heaven on Earth (1927 German film) =

1927 film

- Directed by: Alfred Schirokauer; Reinhold Schünzel
- Written by: Wilhelm Jacobi (play); Arthur Lippschütz (play); Alfred Schirokauer; Reinhold Schünzel
- Produced by: Reinhold Schünzel
- Starring: Reinhold Schünzel; Charlotte Ander; Adele Sandrock
- Music by: Giuseppe Becce
- Production company: Reinhold Schünzel Film
- Distributed by: UFA
- Release date: 26 June 1927
- Running time: 91 minutes
- Country: Germany
- Languages: Silent; German intertitles

Heaven on Earth (German: Der Himmel auf Erden) is a 1927 German silent comedy film directed by Alfred Schirokauer and Reinhold Schünzel and starring Schünzel, Charlotte Ander, and Adele Sandrock. A prohibitionist inherits a cabaret called Heaven on Hearth.

The film's art direction was by Oscar Friedrich Werndorff.

== Cast ==
- Reinhold Schünzel as Traugott Bellmann
- Charlotte Ander as Juliette
- Adele Sandrock as Präsidentin des Sittlichkeitsvereins
- Erich Kaiser-Titz as Dr. Dresdner
- Otto Wallburg as Louis Martiny
- Paul Morgan as Herr Kippel
- S.Z. Sakall as Geschäftsführer
- Ellen Plessow as Frau Kippel
- Ida Perry as Frau Martiny
- Johanna Ewald
- Frigga Braut
- Maria Kamradek
- Emmy Wyda

== Bibliography ==
- Ginsberg, Terri; Mensch, Andrea, eds. (2012). A Companion to German Cinema. Oxford: John Wiley & Sons. ISBN 978-1-4051-9436-5.
