= The Hunt for the Bride =

1927 film

- German: Die Jagd nach der Braut
- Directed by: Georg Jacoby
- Written by: Alfred Schirokauer
- Produced by: Georg Jacoby
- Starring: Georg Alexander; Stewart Rome; Elga Brink
- Cinematography: Emil Schünemann; Károly Vass
- Music by: Walter Ulfig
- Production company: Georg Jacoby-Film
- Distributed by: Matador-Film
- Release date: 17 May 1927
- Country: Germany
- Languages: Silent; German intertitles

The Hunt for the Bride (German: Die Jagd nach der Braut) is a 1927 German silent film directed by George Jacoby and starring Georg Alexander, Stewart Rome and Elga Brink.

The film's art direction was by Franz Schroedter and Hermann Warm.

== Cast ==
- Georg Alexander as Robert Brook
- Paul Otto as Albert Brook, his father
- Stewart Rome as Jeremias Ronald
- Elga Brink as Florence
- Marietta Millner as Elinor Mall
- Jack Trevor as Bill Hoot
- Eugen Burg as Thomas Atkins
- Paula Eberty as Mrs. Booth
