= The Model from Montparnasse =

1929 film

Adieu Mascotte
- Directed by: Wilhelm Thiele
- Written by: Michel Linsky (novel); Franz Schulz
- Produced by: Günther Stapenhorst
- Starring: Lilian Harvey; Igo Sym; Marietta Millner
- Cinematography: Nikolai Toporkoff
- Music by: Willy Schmidt-Gentner
- Production company: UFA
- Distributed by: UFA
- Release date: 2 August 1929
- Country: Germany
- Language: German

The Model from Montparnasse (German: Das Modell vom Montparnasse) or Adieu Mascotte is a 1929 German comedy film directed by Wilhelm Thiele and starring Lilian Harvey, Igo Sym and Marietta Millner. Originally made as a silent film, it later had synchronized sound added. It is set in the Demimonde of Paris with a heroine working as an artist's model.

The film's sets were designed by the art directors Heinz Fenchel and Jacek Rotmil. It was shot at the Babelsberg, Staaken and Tempelhof Studios in Berlin. Location shooting took place in Paris and Nice.

== Cast ==
- Lilian Harvey as Mascotte
- Igo Sym as Jean Dardier, author
- Marietta Millner as Josette, his wife
- Harry Halm as Gaston, her lover
- Julius Falkenstein as Giron
- Ernst Pröckl as Servant at the Gastons
- Erika Dannhoff as A model
- Oskar Sima as Servant at the Dardiers
- Hubert von Meyerinck as Sleeper conductor
- Albert Paulig
- Eugen Thiele

== Bibliography ==
- Prawer, S.S. Between Two Worlds: The Jewish Presence in German and Austrian Film, 1910–1933. Berghahn Books, 2005.
