= The Rainbow (1929 film) =

1929 film directed by Reginald Barker

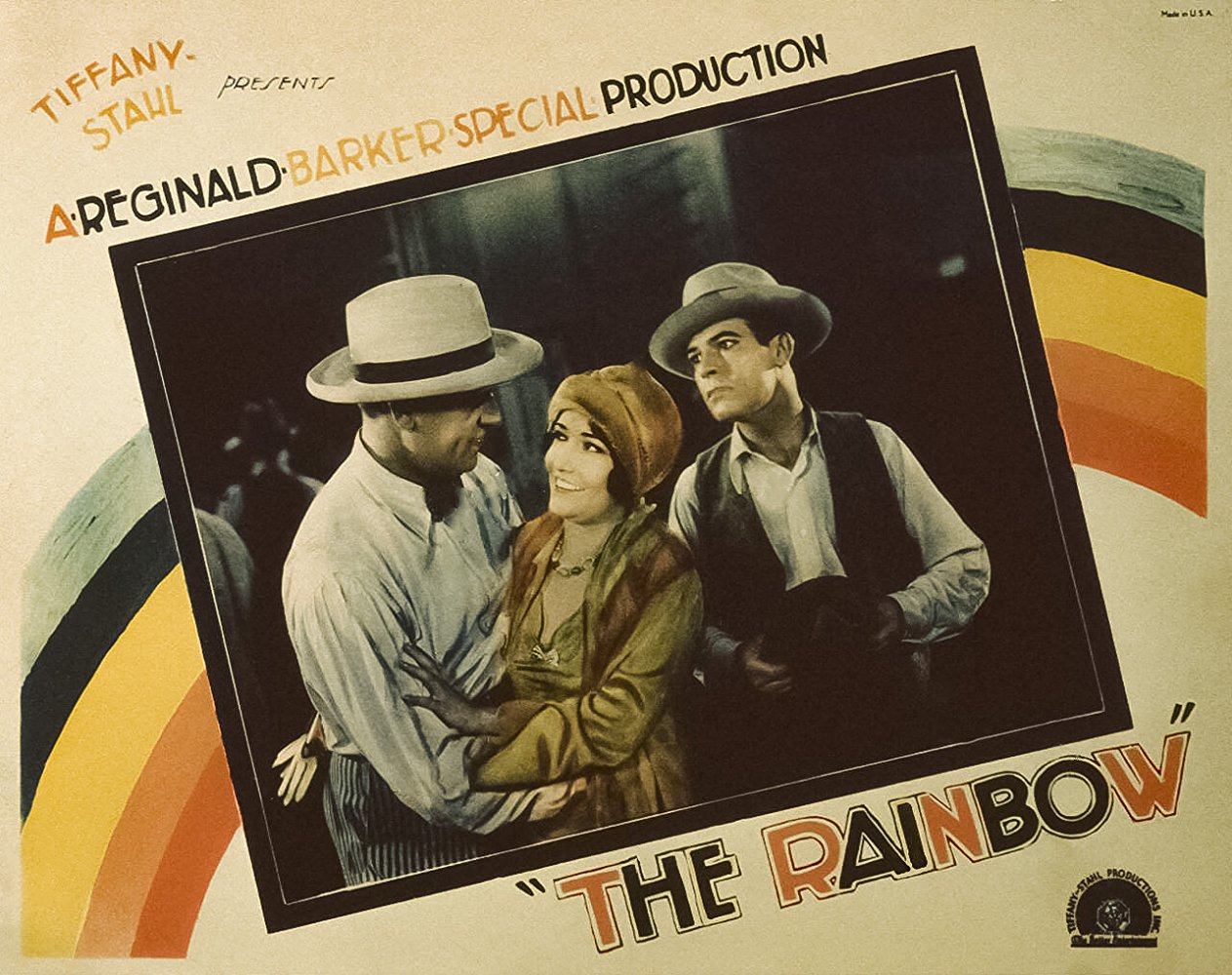
- Directed by: Reginald Barker
- Written by: Fanny Hatton; Frederic Hatton; Gordon Rigby
- Produced by: John M. Stahl
- Starring: Dorothy Sebastian; Lawrence Gray; Sam Hardy
- Cinematography: Ernest Miller
- Edited by: Robert Kern
- Music by: Joseph Littau
- Production company: Tiffany Pictures
- Distributed by: Tiffany Pictures
- Release date: February 1, 1929
- Running time: 68 minutes
- Country: United States
- Languages: Sound (Synchronized) (English Intertitles)

The Rainbow is a 1929 American synchronized sound pre-Code Western film directed by Reginald Barker and starring Dorothy Sebastian, Lawrence Gray and Sam Hardy. While the film has no audible dialog, it was released with a synchronized musical score with sound effects using both the sound-on-disc and sound-on-film process. The soundtrack was recorded using the Tiffany-Tone process using RCA Photophone equipment.

== Cast ==
- Dorothy Sebastian as Lola
- Lawrence Gray as Jim Forbes
- Sam Hardy as Derby Scanlon
- Harvey Clark as Baldy
- Paul Hurst as Pat
- Gino Corrado as Slug
- King Zany as Dummy

== Music ==
The film featured a theme song entitled "The Song of Gold" which was composed by Jimmie V. Monaco and Edgar Leslie.

== See also ==
- List of early sound feature films (1926–1929)

== Bibliography ==
- Pitts, Michael R. Poverty Row Studios, 1929–1940: An Illustrated History of 55 Independent Film Companies, with a Filmography for Each. McFarland & Company, 2005.
