= Fear (Zweig novella) =

1925 novella by Stefan Zweig

- First edition (German)
- Author: Stefan Zweig
- Original title: Angst
- Translator: Anthea Bell
- Language: German
- Publisher: Reclam
- Publication date: 1925
- Publication place: Austria
- English publication date: 2010
- Pages: 75

Fear (German: Angst) is a 1925 novella by the Austrian writer Stefan Zweig. It was adapted into a 1928 silent film, Angst, directed by Hans Steinhoff, a 1936 film, La Peur, directed by Victor Tourjansky, and a 1954 film, Fear, directed by Roberto Rossellini.

== Plot ==
The protagonist, Irene Wagner, is a married and young bourgeois who has a secret affair with a pianist. Due to blackmails from the pianist's girlfriend who is aware of the affair, Irene is seized with fear of losing her dolce vita.

== Reception ==
Nicholas Lezard of The Guardian reviewed the book in 2010: "This is the stuff of melodrama: the typical Zweigian scenario in which, beneath the trappings of respectability, storms of carnal passion, guilt, shame and rage. It is no accident, you feel, that Zweig was writing at the same time and in the same city as Sigmund Freud."

== See also ==
- 1925 in literature
- Austrian literature
