= The Danger Rider (1928 film) =

1928 film

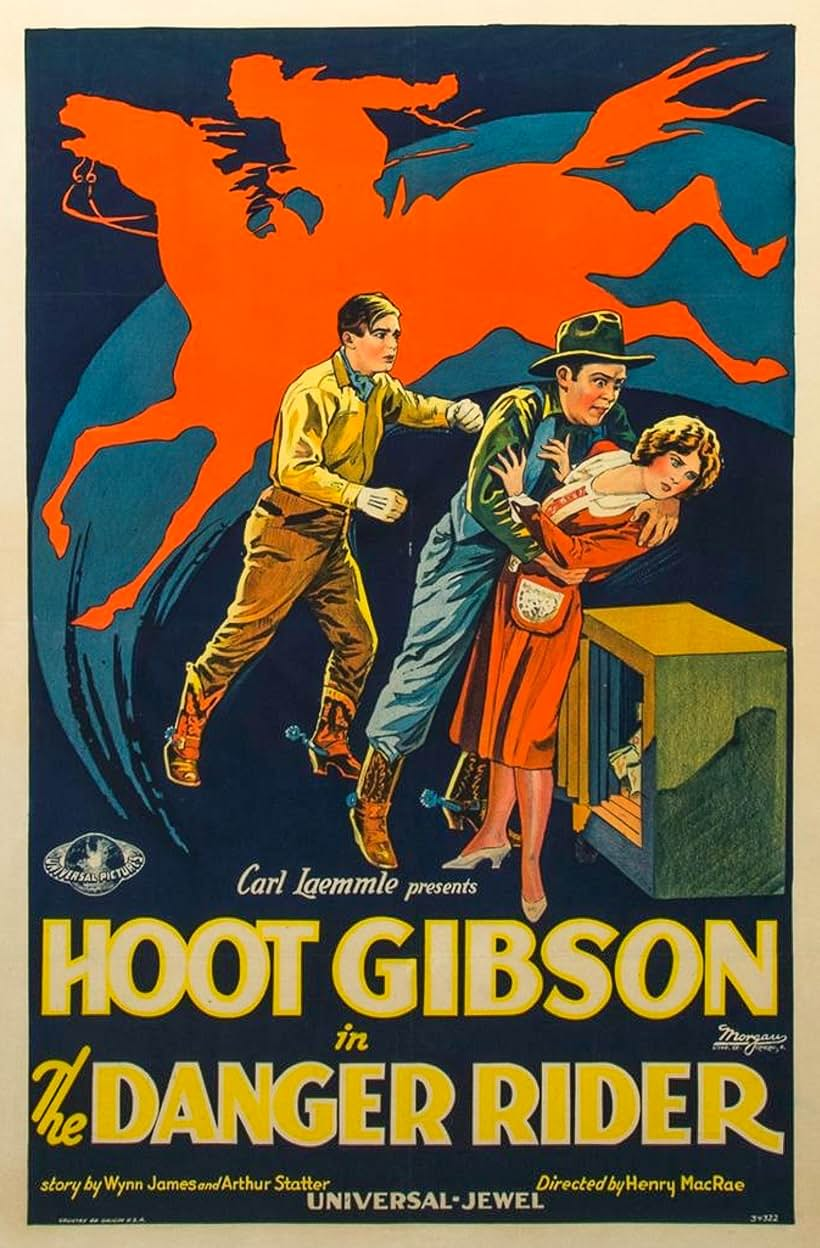
- Directed by: Henry MacRae
- Written by: Arthur Statter
- Based on: screen story by Wynn James
- Produced by: Carl Laemmle
- Starring: Hoot Gibson
- Cinematography: Harry Neumann
- Edited by: Gilmore Walker
- Distributed by: Universal Pictures
- Release date: November 18, 1928
- Running time: 6 reels
- Country: United States
- Languages: Silent; English intertitles

The Danger Rider is a lost 1928 American silent Western film directed by Henry MacRae and starring Hoot Gibson. It was produced and distributed by Universal Pictures.

== Cast ==
- Hoot Gibson - Hal Doyle
- Eugenia Gilbert - Mollie Dare
- B. Reeves Eason - Tucson Joe
- Monte Montague - Scar Bailey
- King Zany - Blinky Ben
- Frank Beal - Warden Doyle
- Milla Davenport - Housekeeper
- Bud Osborne - Sheriff

== Preservation ==
With no holdings located in archives, The Danger Rider is considered a lost film.
