= The Physician (1928 film) =

1928 film

- Directed by: Georg Jacoby
- Written by: Edwin Greenwood
- Based on: The Physician by Henry Arthur Jones
- Produced by: Maurice Elvey; Gareth Gundrey
- Starring: Miles Mander; Elga Brink; Ian Hunter; Lissy Arna
- Cinematography: Gaetano di Ventimiglia
- Production company: Gaumont British Picture Corporation
- Distributed by: Gaumont British
- Release date: 15 May 1928
- Running time: 100 minute
- Country: United Kingdom
- Languages: Silent; English intertitles

The Physician is a 1928 British silent drama film directed by Georg Jacoby and starring Miles Mander, Elga Brink and Ian Hunter. The film is based on the 1897 play of the same title by Henry Arthur Jones. It was shot at the Lime Grove Studios of Gaumont British in London. The film's sets were designed by the art director Andrew Mazzei. It was distributed in the United States by Tiffany Pictures.

== Plot ==
A former alcoholic Walter Amphiel tries to lead a public crusade against drinking, but is himself repeatedly tempted by alcohol. In addition his fiancée Edana discovers that he once had a child with his former mistress. Edana approaches a physician Doctor Carey in the hope that he can treat him. But as she becomes aware of Walter's hopelessness she turns her affections to Carey who has fallen in love with her.

== Cast ==
- Miles Mander as Walter Amphiel
- Elga Brink as Edana Hinde
- Ian Hunter as Dr. Carey
- Lissy Arna as Jessie Gurdon
- Humberston Wright as Stephen Gurdon
- Julie Suedo as Lady Valerie Camille
- Mary Brough as Landlady
- Henry Vibart as Reverend Peregrine Hinde
- Johnny Ashby as Jessie's Son

== Production ==
Jacoby, a German director, shot the film in England. His camera assistant was David Lean in what is his third film credit.

The film "was made as a joint Anglo-German production at Shepherd's Bush by Georg Jacoby and shot by Baron Ventimiglia".
