= The Song of the Nations =

1931 film directed by Rudolf Meinert

- German film poster
- German: Das Lied der Nationen
- Directed by: Rudolf Meinert
- Written by: Johannes Brandt; Wolfgang Geiger
- Starring: Camilla Horn; Igo Sym; Betty Amann
- Cinematography: René Guichard; Günther Krampf; Paul Portier
- Music by: Francis Casadesus; Pablo Labor; Marc Roland
- Production company: Union-Film
- Distributed by: Omnium-Film
- Release date: 17 March 1931
- Running time: 106 minutes
- Country: Germany
- Language: German

The Song of the Nations (German: Das Lied der Nationen) is a 1931 German musical film directed by Rudolf Meinert and starring Camilla Horn, Igo Sym and Betty Amann. A separate French-language version La chanson des nations was also produced.

== Cast ==
- Camilla Horn
- Igo Sym
- Betty Amann
- Erna Morena
- Weiß Ferdl
- Jack Trevor
- Charles Willy Kayser
- Ernst Reicher
- Rudolf Meinert
