= The Five Accursed Gentlemen =

1932 film

- Directed by: Julien Duvivier
- Written by: André Reuze (novel); Julien Duvivier
- Produced by: Charles Delac; Marcel Vandal
- Starring: Anton Walbrook; Camilla Horn; Jack Trevor
- Cinematography: René Moreau; Armand Thirard
- Edited by: Marc Sorkin
- Music by: Jacques Ibert
- Production company: Les Films Marcel Vandal et Charles Delac
- Distributed by: Vereinigte Star-Film
- Release date: 23 March 1932
- Running time: 80 minutes
- Country: France
- Language: German

The Five Accursed Gentlemen (German: Die fünf verfluchten Gentlemen) is a 1932 French mystery drama film directed by Julien Duvivier and starring Anton Walbrook, Camilla Horn and Jack Trevor. It was made as the German-language version of Moon Over Morocco.

== Cast ==
- Anton Walbrook as Petersen
- Camilla Horn as Camilla
- Jack Trevor as Strawber
- Allan Durant as Midlock
- Georges Péclet as Lawson
- Marc Dantzer as Woodland
- Hans Sternberg as Marouvelle

== Bibliography ==
- Bock, Hans-Michael; Bergfelder, Tim, eds. (2009). The concise Cinegraph : encyclopaedia of German cinema. New York: Berghahn Books. ISBN 978-1-57181-655-9.
