= The Joker (1928 film) =

1928 film

- Official poster from 1928 by Palle Wennerwald
- German: Jokeren
- Directed by: Georg Jacoby
- Written by: Georg Jacoby; Jens Locher
- Based on: The Joker by Noel Scott
- Starring: Henry Edwards; Elga Brink; Miles Mander
- Cinematography: Poul Eibye; Louis Larsen; Emil Schünemann
- Music by: Walter Ulfig
- Production company: Nordisk Film
- Distributed by: Kinografen
- Release date: 10 March 1928
- Countries: Denmark; Germany
- Languages: Silent; Danish intertitles

The Joker (1928)

The Joker (Danish: Jokeren) is a 1928 Danish-German silent drama film directed by Georg Jacoby and starring Henry Edwards, Elga Brink, Miles Mander and Renée Héribel. It is based upon the 1927 play The Joker by Noel Scott. The film was also released under the German language title Der Faschingskönig (English: The King of the Carnival).

It was shot at the Grunewald Studios in Berlin as well as on location in Nice. The film's sets were designed by the art director Willi Herrmann.

== Cast ==
- Henry Edwards as Mr. Carstairs
- Elga Brink as Gill
- Miles Mander as Mr. Borwick
- Aage Hertel as Jonny
- Renée Héribel as Lady Powder
- Christian Schrøder as James
- Philip Bech as Edward
- Ruth Komdrup as Lou Lou
- Aage Bendixen
- Olga Svendsen
- Gabriel Gabrio as Sir Herbert Powder

== Bibliography ==
- Hans-Michael Bock and Tim Bergfelder. The Concise Cinegraph: An Encyclopedia of German Cinema. Berghahn Books, 2009.
