= José Germain Drouilly =

French writer

José Germain Drouilly (Paris, 1884-1964), more commonly writing under the name José Germain, was a French writer. Some of his works were turned into Silent era film scripts, such as The Magnificent Flirt (1928), from the novel Maman.

== Works ==
More than 200 works are listed in the Bibliothèque nationale de France, some of them under the name (Jean-)Germain Drouilly, others under the name of Lieutenant D., among which:

- À bas les calottes, Paris, A. Lesot, 1911.
- Notre guerre, Paris, Renaissance du livre, 1918.
- Notre France en guerre, Paris, Hachette, 1919.
- Nos marins en guerre, Paris, Berger-Levrault, 1919.
- Rosa Berghem, Paris, Albin Michel, 1921.
- Danseront-elles ? Enquête sur les danses modernes, Paris, Povolozki, 1921.
- Un fils de France, Paris, Plon, 1922.
- Le général Laperrine, grand saharien, Paris, Plon, 1922.
- Le Sosie, Paris, Albin Michel, 1922.
- Pour Genièvre, Paris, Ferenczi, 1923.
- La seconde jeunesse, Paris, Ed. du Monde Nouveau, 1924.
- Le nouveau monde français, Paris, Plon, 1924.
- Le Roi des rosiers, Paris, Ferenczi, 1925.
- Oh! Qu'elle était belle (sous l'Empire), Paris, Les pamphlets du Capitole, 1926.
- L'étreinte des races, Paris, Baudinière, 1928.
- Le Syndicalisme de l'intelligence, Paris, Librairie Valois, 1928.
- La touchante histoire de Geneviève de Brabant, Elbeuf, 1928.
- Femme, Paris, Baudinière, 1929.
- La danse de folie, Paris, Ed. Cosmopolites, 1930.
- Une heure de musique avec les chansons de guerre, Paris, Ed. Cosmopolites, 1930.
- Les yeux de l'âme, Monaco, Société de Conférences, 1930.
- Bretagne en France et l'union de 1532, Paris, Tallandier, 1931.
- La Cormorandière, Ed. des Portiques, 1932.
- Minuit. Histoire de vingt-sept nuits, Paris, Tallandier, 1932.
- L'Amour mathématique, Paris, Tallandier, 1932.
- Ma Poupette chérie, Paris, Ferenczi, 1933.
- Seule parmi les hommes, Paris, Tallandier, 1933.
- Les Enfants perdus, Paris, Albin Michel, 1936.
- Le roman d'Anet ou les amours de Diane de Poitiers, Paris, Les Editions nationales, 1936.
- Trésor des héros, Paris, Spes, 1937.
- Héros d'un jour, Paris, Spes, 1939.
- Notre chef Pétain, Paris, Technique du livre, 1941.
- Héros de France, Paris, Éditions de France, 1942.
- Mes Catastrophes, Paris, La Couronne littéraire, 1948, dédicacé au général René Chambe.
- La première leçon d'amour, Paris, La Couronne littéraire, 1948.
- Première leçon d'amour, Paris, La Couronne littéraire, 1950.
- Sappho de Lesbos, Paris, Deux rives, 1954.
- Richemont, compagnon de Jeanne d'Arc, Paris, Pierre Amiot, 1957.
- Le théâtre des familles, Paris, Albin Michel, 1961.
- L'Amour aux étapes, Paris, Renaissance du Livre, s.d.
- La Flotte rouge, Paris, Baudinière, s.d.
