= Károly Vass (cinematographer) =

- Born: 20 June 1896; Budapest, Austria-Hungary
- Died: 3 October 1953 (aged 57); Budapest, Hungary
- Other names: Karl Vass, Karl Vash
- Occupation: Cinematographer
- Years active: 1917–1944 (film)

Károly Vass (1896–1953) was a Hungarian cinematographer. He worked in Germany during the silent era where he was often credited as Karl Vass.

== Selected filmography ==
- Casanova (1918)
- Lili (1918)
- The Hustler (1920)
- Lucrezia Borgia (1922)
- The Island of Tears (1923)
- Paganini (1923)
- The Wonderful Adventure (1924)
- Should We Get Married? (1924)
- The Hanseatics (1925)
- Ballettratten (1925)
- Two and a Lady (1926)
- The Island of Forbidden Kisses (1927)
- The Hunt for the Bride (1927)
- Vacation from Marriage (1927)
- Intoxicated Love (1927)
- Nameless Woman (1927)
- Only a Viennese Woman Kisses Like That (1928)
- Sweet Pepper (1929)
- The Night Without Pause (1931)
- Grandstand for General Staff (1932)
- The Call of the Jungle (1936)
- Rosemary (1938)
- No Coincidence (1939)
- Wildflowers of Gyimes (1939)
- Sarajevo (1940)
- Gábor Göre Returns (1940)
- On the Way Home (1940)
- Taken by the Flood (1941)
- Left-Handed Angel (1941)
- Sister Beáta (1941)
- Yellow Rose (1941)
- Costume Ball (1942)
- The Perfect Family (1942)
- The Last Song (1942)

== Bibliography ==
- Krautz, Alfred. International directory of cinematographers set- and costume designers in film: Volume VIII. Saur, 1989.
