= Hugo Werner-Kahle =

German actor

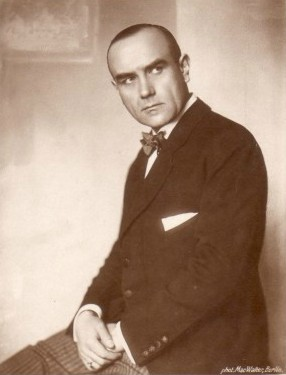
- Born: 5 August 1882; Aachen, Rhine Province, German Empire
- Died: 1 May 1961 (aged 78); West Berlin, West Germany
- Occupation: Actor
- Years active: 1914–1944 (film)
- Spouse: Annemarie Steinsieck

Hugo Werner-Kahle (5 August 1882 – 1 May 1961) was a German stage and film actor (and sporadically, a movie director). He appeared in around a hundred films during his career.

== Selected filmography ==
- Midnight (1918)
- The Bracelet (1918)
- Europe, General Delivery (1918)
- The Count of Cagliostro (1920)
- Biribi (1922)
- Money in the Streets (1922)
- Tabitha, Stand Up (1922)
- Miss Madame (1923)
- Friend Ripp (1923)
- The Lost Soul, or: The Dangers of Hypnosis (1923)
- Modern Vices (1924)
- The Other Woman (1924)
- Hunted Men (1924)
- A Woman for 24 Hours (1925)
- The Uninvited Guest (1925)
- Shadows of the Metropolis (1925)
- Cock of the Roost (1925)
- The Woman with That Certain Something (1925)
- Accommodations for Marriage (1926)
- The Pride of the Company (1926)
- We'll Meet Again in the Heimat (1926)
- The Ride in the Sun (1926)
- Department Store Princess (1926)
- The Great Unknown (1927)
- Aftermath (1927)
- The Awakening of Woman (1927)
- Modern Pirates (1928)
- Adam and Eve (1928)
- Fair Game (1928)
- Yacht of the Seven Sins (1928)
- The Strange Night of Helga Wangen (1928)
- The Man with the Frog (1929)
- Painted Youth (1929)
- Lux, King of Criminals (1929)
- Distinguishing Features (1929)
- Revolt in the Reformatory (1929)
- A Mother's Love (1929)
- Dear Homeland (1929)
- Come Back, All Is Forgiven (1929)
- Affair at the Grand Hotel (1929)
- The Road to Dishonour (1930)
- Louise, Queen of Prussia (1931)
- Checkmate (1931)
- The Mad Bomberg (1932)
- The Heath Is Green (1932)
- Roses from the South (1934)
- One Too Many on Board (1935)
- Fresh Wind from Canada (1935)
- Streak of Steel (1935)
- Punks Arrives from America (1935)
- Moscow-Shanghai (1936)
- Port Arthur (1936)
- Ninety Minute Stopover (1936)
- A Woman of No Importance (1936)
- The Yellow Flag (1937)
- Togger (1937)
- The Muzzle (1938)
- Our Miss Doctor (1940)
- The Roedern Affair (1944)

== Bibliography ==
- Soister, John T. Conrad Veidt on Screen: A Comprehensive Illustrated Filmography. McFarland, 2002.
