= Alexander Roda Roda =

Austrian writer

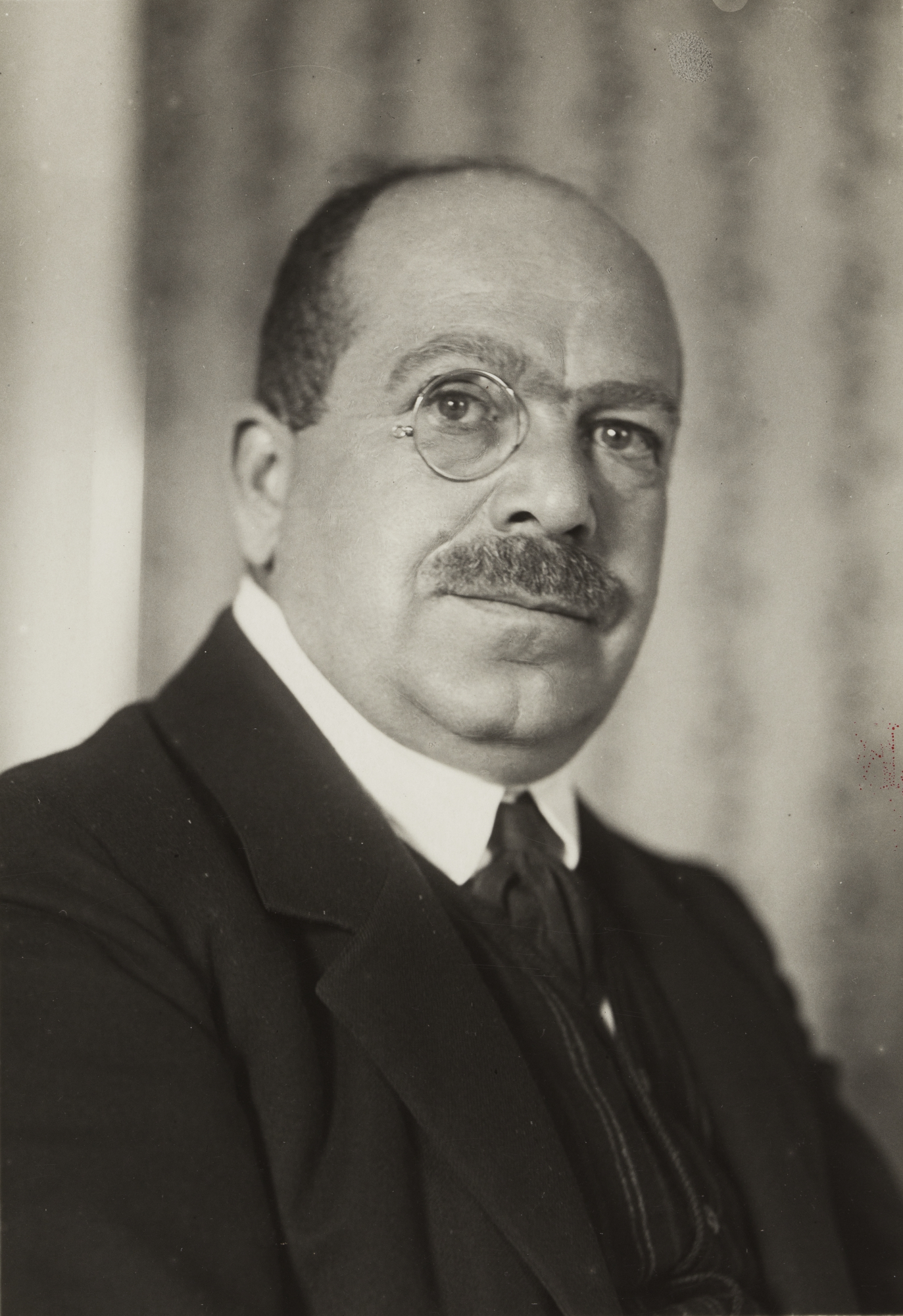
- Born: Šandor Friedrich Rosenfeld; 13 April 1872; Drnowitz, Moravia, Austro-Hungarian Monarchy (now Drnovice, Czech Republic)
- Died: 20 August 1945 (aged 73); New York City
- Occupation: Writer
- Relatives: Gisela Januszewska (sister)

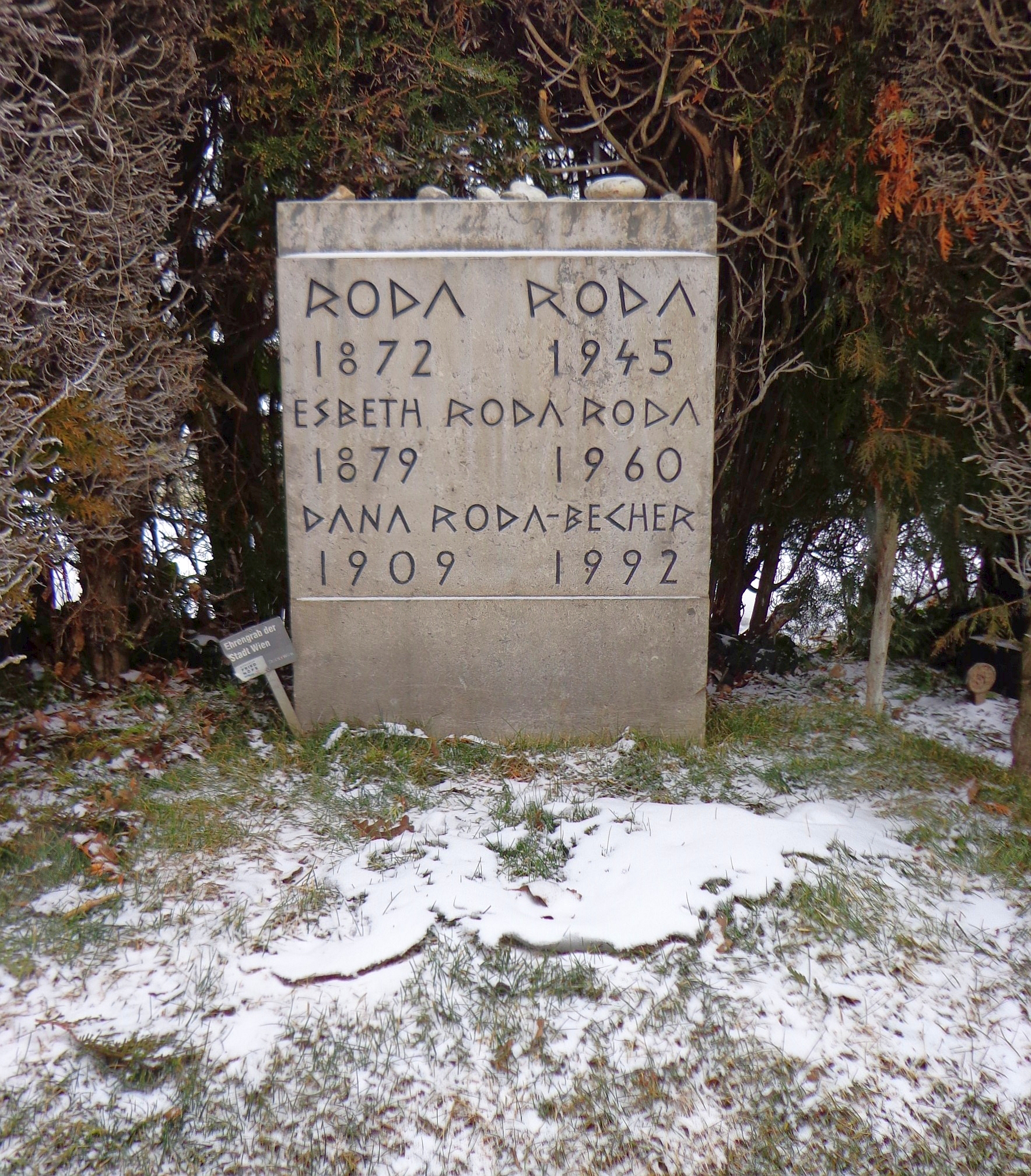
Grave of Roda Roda, Feuerhalle Simmering

Alexander Friedrich Ladislaus Roda Roda (13 April 1872 – 20 August 1945) was an Austrian writer and satirist.

== Biography ==
Roda Roda was born as Šandor Friedrich Rosenfeld in Drnowitz, Moravia, Austria-Hungary (now Drnovice, Czech Republic). His sister was the physician Gisela Januszewska. As a child, he moved with his family to Slavonia. He Germanized his name from Šandor to Alexander, and his surname from Rosenfeld to Roda Roda. Roda is the Croatian word for stork. He chose his new surname because storks nested on the chimney of his house in Esseg (today Osijek).

In 1894, Roda Roda converted from Judaism to Catholicism. In 1902, Roda Roda quit the military career and became a journalist (during World War I he was war correspondent); he contributed to the German satirical magazine Simplicissimus. In 1938, he emigrated to the US. He wrote many comedies (Der König von Crucina, 1892; Bubi, 1912, with Gustav Meyrink), tales and novels (Soldatengeschichten, 2 volumes, 1904; Der Ehegarten, 1913, Der Schnaps, der Rauchtabak und die verfluchte Liebe, 1908; Die Panduren, 1935), and autobiographical books (Irrfahrten eines Humoristen 1914–1919, 1920; Roda Rodas Roman, 1925). He died in New York City.

In 1911 Roda Roda published a series of articles for the Neue Freie Presse, one of Austria's most respected newspapers. Between 1914 and 1917, he produced nearly 700 articles as war correspondent for the paper as well as the German-language newspaper published in Budapest, Pester Lloyd. In the 1920s, Roda Roda's humorous and satirical book publications were largely successful. He appeared in cabarets, traveled extensively, and had contact with dozens of authors, actors, filmmakers, and other artists of his milieu. His work was part of the literature event in the art competition at the 1936 Summer Olympics.

Roda Roda's ashes are buried at Feuerhalle Simmering.

Roda Roda was also a passionate chess player and often played in the Munich coffee house Café Stefanie. Here he found inspiration for his humorous text that discusses chess, "Das Pensionistengambit" (The Pensioners' Gambit), originally the chapter "Schach" in his 1932 collection Roda Roda und die vierzig Schurken.

In 1952, Vienna's city district Floridsdorf (the 21st district) named a street, Roda-Roda-Gasse, after the author. The city of Osijek, Croatia, also boasts a bust of Roda Roda in front of the library building in Europska avenija.

== Bibliography ==
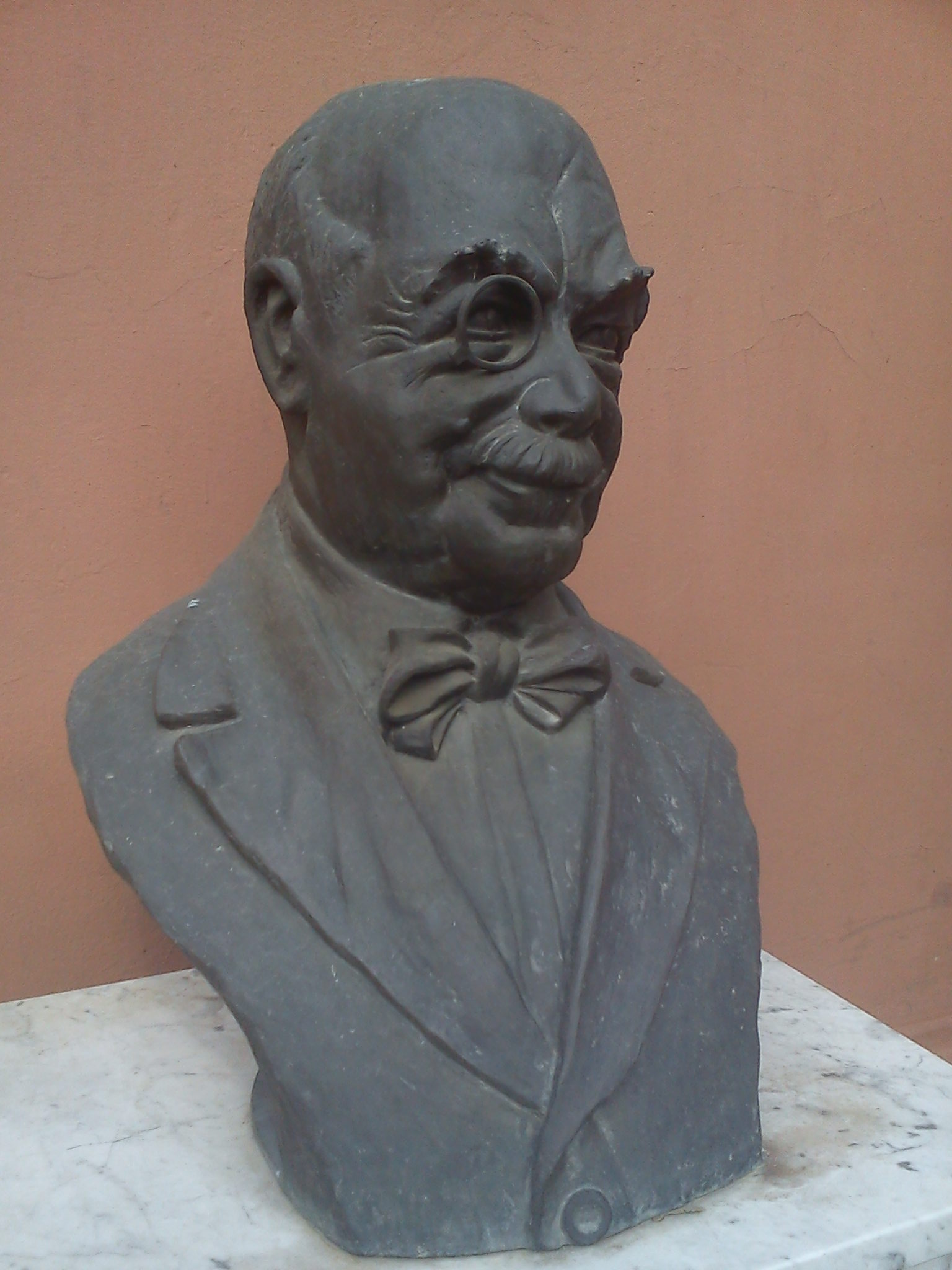
Bust in Osijek

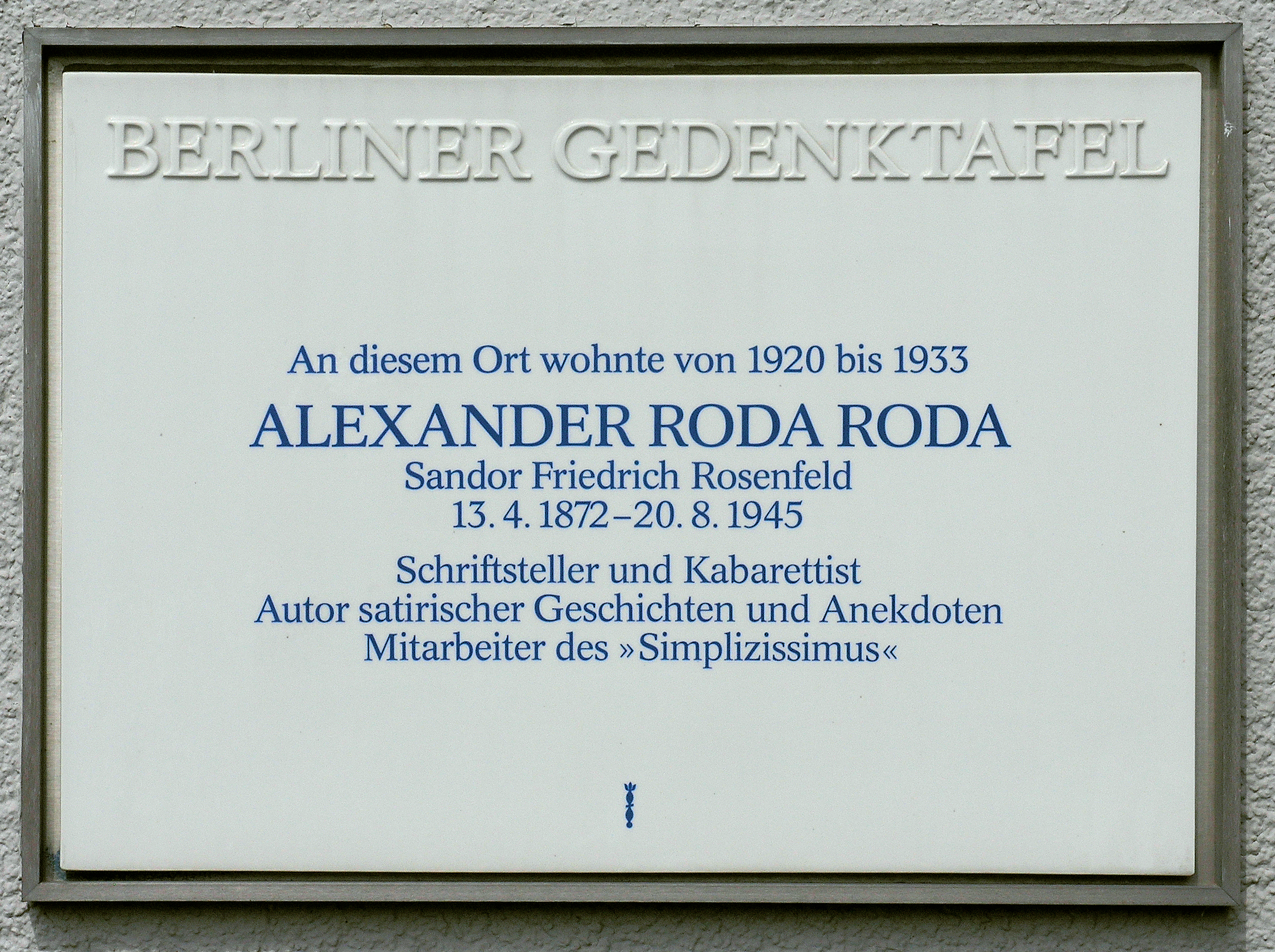
Memorial plaque, Berlin

- 1892 – Der Gutsherr von Ljublin
- 1906 – Eines Esels Kinnbacken
- 1908 – Von Bienen, Drohnen und Baronen
- 1909 – Bummler, Schummler und Rossetummler
- 1913 – 500 Schwänke
- 1924 – Ein Frühling in Amerika; new 2021 by Berlinica
- 1925 – Roda Rodas Roman, Roda Roda erzählt
- 1927 – Donner und Doria

== Filmography ==
=== Film adaptations ===
- Der Feldherrnhügel, directed by Hans Otto and Erich Schönfelder (1926, based on the 1910 play of that name)
- Grandstand for General Staff, directed by Eugen Thiele (1932, based on the play Der Feldherrnhügel)
- Der Feldherrnhügel, directed by Ernst Marischka (1953)
- Der Knabe mit den 13 Vätern, directed by Thomas Fantl (1976, TV series, based on the novel Der Knabe mit den 13 Vätern)

=== Screenwriter ===
- K. und K. Feldmarschall, directed by Karel Lamač (1930, German adaptation of a Czech screenplay)
- Er und seine Schwester, directed by Karel Lamač (1931, German adaptation of a Czech screenplay)
- Liebeskommando, directed by Géza von Bolváry (1931)
