= Three Around Edith =

1929 film

- Directed by: Erich Waschneck
- Written by: Walther Harich
- Starring: Camilla Horn; Jack Trevor; Gustav Diessl
- Cinematography: Friedl Behn-Grund
- Music by: Pasquale Perris
- Production company: National Film
- Distributed by: National Film
- Release date: 12 November 1929
- Country: Germany
- Languages: Silent; German intertitles

Three Around Edith (German: Die Drei um Edith) is a 1929 German silent crime film directed by Erich Waschneck and starring Camilla Horn, Jack Trevor and Gustav Diessl. It was shot at the National Studios in Berlin. The film's sets were designed by the art director Alfred Junge.

== Cast ==
- Camilla Horn as Lady Edith Trent
- Jack Trevor as Thomas Morland
- Gustav Diessl as Roger Brown
- Paul Hörbiger as Nick
- Fritz Rasp as Pistol
- Adele Sandrock as Ediths Tante
- Hubert von Meyerinck as Scherbe
- Lothar Körner as Beby

== Bibliography ==
- Hans-Michael Bock and Tim Bergfelder. The Concise Cinegraph: An Encyclopedia of German Cinema. Berghahn Books.
