= Circus Romanelli =

1926 film

- German: Der dumme August des Zirkus Romanelli
- Directed by: Georg Jacoby
- Written by: Alfred Schirokauer; Reinhold Schünzel
- Starring: Reinhold Schünzel; Claire Rommer; Victor Janson
- Cinematography: Otto Kanturek; Gustave Preiss
- Music by: Willy Schmidt-Gentner
- Production company: Domo-Film
- Distributed by: Strauss-Film
- Release date: 13 May 1926
- Country: Germany
- Languages: Silent; German intertitles

Circus Romanelli (German: Der dumme August des Zirkus Romanelli) is a 1926 German silent comedy film directed by Georg Jacoby and starring Reinhold Schünzel, Claire Rommer and Victor Janson.

== Cast ==
- Reinhold Schünzel as August
- Claire Rommer as Viola
- Victor Janson as director
- Trude Hesterberg as Frau Direktor
- Anton Pointner as Robert, Violas Bräutigam Kunstreiter
- Sig Arno as Jolli
- Paul Westermeier as Polli
- Julius Falkenstein as Eberhard, Majoratsherr auf Stockeling
- Elga Brink as Elga
- Fritz Greiner as Karussellbesitzer
- Hermann Picha
- Paul Biensfeldt
- Paul Morgan
