= The Little Napoleon =

1923 film directed by Georg Jacoby

- Directed by: Georg Jacoby
- Written by: Robert Liebmann; Georg Jacoby
- Starring: Egon von Hagen; Paul Heidemann; Harry Liedtke; Jakob Tiedtke
- Cinematography: Max Schneider; Emil Schünemann; Walter von Gudenberg
- Production company: European Film Alliance
- Release date: 29 November 1923
- Country: Germany
- Languages: Silent; German intertitles

The Little Napoleon (German: Der kleine Napoleon) is a 1923 German silent historical comedy film directed by Georg Jacoby and starring Egon von Hagen, Paul Heidemann and Harry Liedtke. It depicts the life and amorous adventures of Jérôme Bonaparte, the younger brother of Napoleon, who installed him as King of Westphalia.

The film is best known for the small role played by Marlene Dietrich as Kathrin, a lady's maid. Her brief appearance was filmed over several days during the summer of 1922. It marked Dietrich's film debut, though she was later unhappy with her early silent films. She was cast after impressing the director, Georg Jacoby, during a meeting arranged for them. Dietrich played gradually more substantial roles during the rest of the decade until her breakthrough film The Blue Angel (1930).

The film was made by the European Film Alliance (EFA), a failed attempt by the American firm Paramount to establish a production base in the lucrative German market. The EFA was wound up shortly after the film's completion, which delayed its release. It finally premièred on 29 November 1923 at the Marmorhaus in Berlin.

The Little Napoleon is one of many works from 1923 that entered the public domain in the United States in 2019.

== Cast ==
- Paul Heidemann as Jérôme Bonaparte
- Egon von Hagen as Napoleon Bonaparte
- Harry Liedtke as George von Melsungen
- Jakob Tiedtke as Jeremias von Katzenellenbogen
- Wilhelm Bendow as Jerômes Diener
- Paul Biensfeldt as Feldmarchall
- Marquisette Bosky as Primaballerina
- Antonia Dietrich as Charlotte
- Marlene Dietrich as Kathrin
- Kurt Fuß as Leiter des königlichen Baletts
- Alice Hechy as Annemarie
- Loni Nest as Lieselotte
- Kurt Vespermann as Florian Wunderlich
- Loni Pyrmont

== Bibliography ==
- Bach, Steven (2011) [1992]. Marlene Dietrich: Life and Legend. Minneapolis: University of Minnesota Press. ISBN 978-0-8166-7584-5.
- Prawer, Siegbert Salomon (2005). Between Two Worlds: The Jewish Presence in German and Austrian Film, 1910–1933. New York: Berghahn Books. ISBN 978-1-84545-074-8.
- Spoto, Donald (2000). Blue Angel: The Life of Marlene Dietrich. New York: Cooper Square Press. ISBN 978-1-4616-2421-9.
