= Gisela Januszewska =

19th and 20th-century Austrian physician

- Born: Gisela Rosenfeld; 22 January 1867; Drnovice, Moravia, Austria-Hungary
- Died: 2 March 1943 (aged 76); Theresienstadt concentration camp, Protectorate of Bohemia and Moravia
- Education: University of Zurich
- Occupation: Physician
- Known for: First female physician in Banja Luka
- Spouses: Joachim Kuhn; Ladislaus Januszewski
- Awards: German Red Cross Decoration; Austrian Order of the Civil Merit; Knight's Cross of the Order of Merit

Gisela Januszewska (also known by surnames Kuhn, Rosenfeld and Roda; 22 January 1867 – 2 March 1943) was an Austrian physician. Having earned her degree in Switzerland, she briefly worked in Germany before becoming the first female physician in the ethnically Serbian town of Banja Luka in Bosnia Herzegovina within the Austro-Hungarian Empire. She received the highest decorations for her service during the First World War and social activism in Austria afterwards, but was deported to a Nazi concentration camp, where she died, during the Second World War.

== Early life and education ==
Gisela Januszewska was born on 22 January 1867 in the Moravian village of Drnovice, then part of Austria-Hungary and now in the Czech Republic. She was one of five children of Leopold Rosenfeld, an estate manager in the Slavonian town of Grubišno Polje. The family was Jewish, and were informally called Roda (Serbo-Croatian word for stork). Januszewska's younger brother Alexander, a satire writer, legally adopted that name. After attending a private school in Brno, she married the much older Joachim Kuhn. Feeling trapped in the marriage, she filed for divorce within a few years. Januszewska then moved to Switzerland, where she took matura and enrolled in the University of Zürich. She received a degree in medicine as Gisela Kuhn on 12 April 1898.

== Career ==
Having gained her first experience in the obstetrics volunteering at the Women's Hospital in Zürich, Januszewska moved in June 1898 to Remscheid, German Empire, and became an insurance doctor for Allgemeine Ortskrankenkasse. In March 1899, she was appointed Amtsärztin, a public health official, in the Bosnian town of Banja Luka, becoming its first female physician.

During her career in Banja Luka, Januszewska was one of few physicians who strove to ensure that Bosnian Muslim women had proper access to healthcare. Her initial supervisor there, the 20 years older Ladislaus Januszewski, became her second husband in 1900. Upon their marriage, Januszewska had to abandon her post as public health official. Instead she served as head of an outpatient clinic for Muslim women of Banja Luka. She performed minor surgeries and gained fame treating patients with smallpox, typhoid, typhus and syphilis, but most of all osteomalacia (the last being especially rampant among Muslim women, according to Teodora Krajewska, another physician in Bosnia at the time).

Following Januszewski's retirement, the couple moved to Graz. She took up doctoral studies shortly before the outbreak of the First World War, enrolling at the University of Graz. Widowed in 1916, she volunteered to enter the military medical corps as the only physician available to the Militärkommando.

Januszewska received several medals for her services, including German Red Cross Decoration and the Austrian Order of the Civil Merit. After the war, in 1919, she opened her own practice in Graz. Until 1933, she functioned as a panel physician for Styria and Carinthia's Association of Health Insurance. She was widely respected for her social responsibility: not only did she treat the underprivileged for free, she also financially supported some of them. She was the second Austrian physician to be awarded the title Medizinalrat, an award for outstanding contributions to medicine.

== Later life ==
By the end of 1935, Januszewska had closed her practice but continued her social work. In 1937, her work was rewarded with the Knight's Cross of the Order of Merit, Austria's highest honour. Within a year, however, Austria was invaded and annexed by Nazi Germany. Januszewska found herself a victim of its racial policy. Her Graz apartment was confiscated in 1940, and she was forced to move to Vienna, from where she was deported to the Theresienstadt concentration camp. She died there on 2 March 1943, aged 76.
