= Marietta Millner =

Austrian silent film actress (1894–1929)

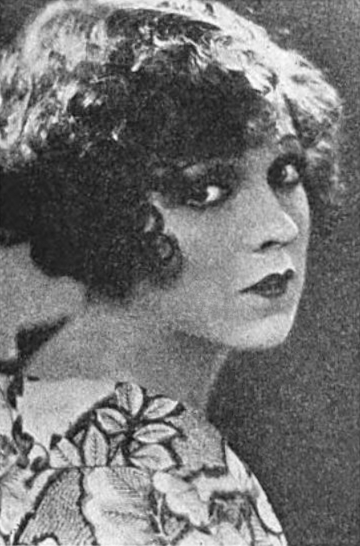
- Born: 8 December 1894; Linz, Austro-Hungarian Empire
- Died: 26 June 1929 (aged 34); Baden bei Wien, Austria
- Other name: Maria Anna Paula Bieberhöfer
- Occupation: Actress
- Years active: 1926–1929 (film)

Marietta Millner (8 December 1894 – 26 June 1929) was an Austrian film actress of the silent era.

== Personal life ==
Millner married a businessman from Klagenfurt.

Millner died from tuberculosis on 26 June 1929, in Baden bei Wien. Her death was attributed to "extreme dieting".

== Selected filmography ==
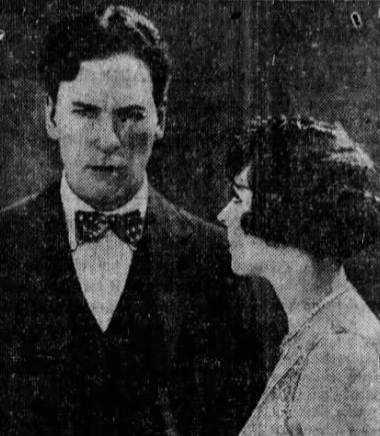
Millner (right) alongside Thomas Meighan in The City Gone Wild (1927)

- Das Spielzeug von Paris (1925)
- Sons in Law (1926)
- The City Gone Wild (1927)
- The Hunt for the Bride (1927)
- We're All Gamblers (1927)
- The Island of Forbidden Kisses (1927)
- Drums of the Desert (1927)
- Nameless Woman (1927)
- Intoxicated Love (1927)
- Modern Pirates (1928)
- The Magnificent Flirt (1928)
- The Model from Montparnasse (1929)
- The Tsarevich (1929)

== Bibliography ==
- Wendy Warwick White. Ford Sterling: The Life and Films. McFarland, 2007.
