= Broadway or Bust =

1924 film directed by Edward Sedgwick

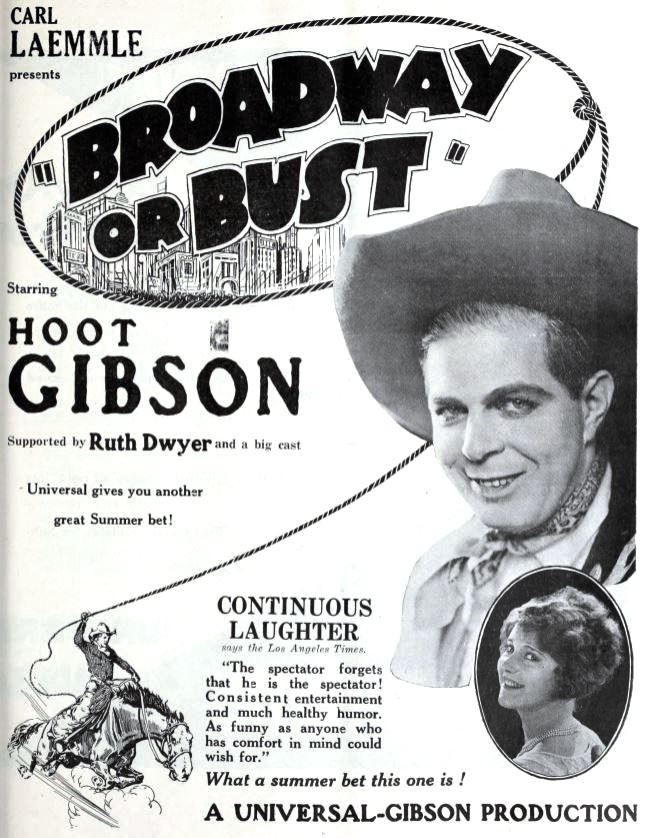
- Advertisement
- Directed by: Edward Sedgwick
- Written by: Dorothy Yost
- Story by: Edward Sedgwick; Raymond L. Schrock
- Produced by: Carl Laemmle
- Starring: Hoot Gibson
- Cinematography: Virgil Miller
- Distributed by: Universal Pictures
- Release date: June 9, 1924
- Running time: 1 hour; 6 reels
- Country: United States
- Languages: Silent; English intertitles

Broadway or Bust is a 1924 American silent Western comedy film directed by Edward Sedgwick and starring Hoot Gibson. It was produced and distributed by Universal Pictures.

== Cast ==
- Hoot Gibson as Dave Hollis
- Ruth Dwyer as Virginia Redding
- King Zany as Jeff Peters
- Gertrude Astor as Mrs. Dean Smythe
- Stanhope Wheatcroft as Freddie
- Fred Malatesta as Count Dardnelle

== Preservation ==
With no prints of Broadway or Bust located in any film archives, it is a lost film.

== See also ==
- Hoot Gibson filmography
- Gertrude Astor filmography
