= The Magnificent Flirt =

1928 film

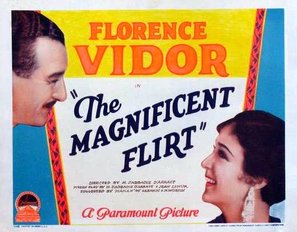
- Directed by: Harry d'Abbadie d'Arrast
- Screenplay by: José Germain Drouilly; Herman J. Mankiewicz; Harry d'Abbadie d'Arrast; Jean de Limur
- Produced by: Jesse L. Lasky; Adolph Zukor
- Starring: Florence Vidor; Albert Conti; Loretta Young; Matty Kemp; Marietta Millner; Ned Sparks
- Cinematography: Henry W. Gerrard
- Edited by: Frances Marsh
- Production company: Famous Players–Lasky Corporation
- Distributed by: Paramount Pictures
- Release date: June 2, 1928
- Running time: 74 minutes
- Country: United States
- Language: English

The Magnificent Flirt is a lost 1928 American comedy silent film directed by Harry d'Abbadie d'Arrast and written by José Germain Drouilly, Herman J. Mankiewicz, Harry d'Abbadie d'Arrast and Jean de Limur. The film stars Florence Vidor, Albert Conti, Loretta Young, Matty Kemp, Marietta Millner and Ned Sparks. The film was released on June 2, 1928, by Paramount Pictures.

== Plot ==
Count D'Estrange tries to save his nephew Hubert from Denise Laverne he believes a heartless flirt. Denise's mother Mme. Florence Laverne uses all her charms to solve the problems. Finally Count D'Estrange marries Mme. Florence Laverne. Both couples leave for a honeymoon in Venice.

== Cast ==
- Florence Vidor as Mme. Florence Laverne
- Albert Conti as Count D'Estrange
- Loretta Young as Denise Laverne
- Matty Kemp as Hubert
- Marietta Millner as Fifi
- Ned Sparks as Tim
