= Biribi (film) =

1922 film

- Directed by: Hans Steinhoff
- Starring: Hugo Werner-Kahle
- Production company: Volo-Film
- Release date: 1922
- Country: Austria
- Languages: Silent; German intertitles

Biribi is a 1922 Austrian silent film directed by Hans Steinhoff and starring Hugo Werner-Kahle.

== Bibliography ==
Elisabeth Büttner & Christian Dewald. Das tägliche Brennen: eine Geschichte des österreichischen Films von den Anfängen bis 1945, Volume 1. Residenz, 2002.
