= Annemarie Steinsieck =

German actress

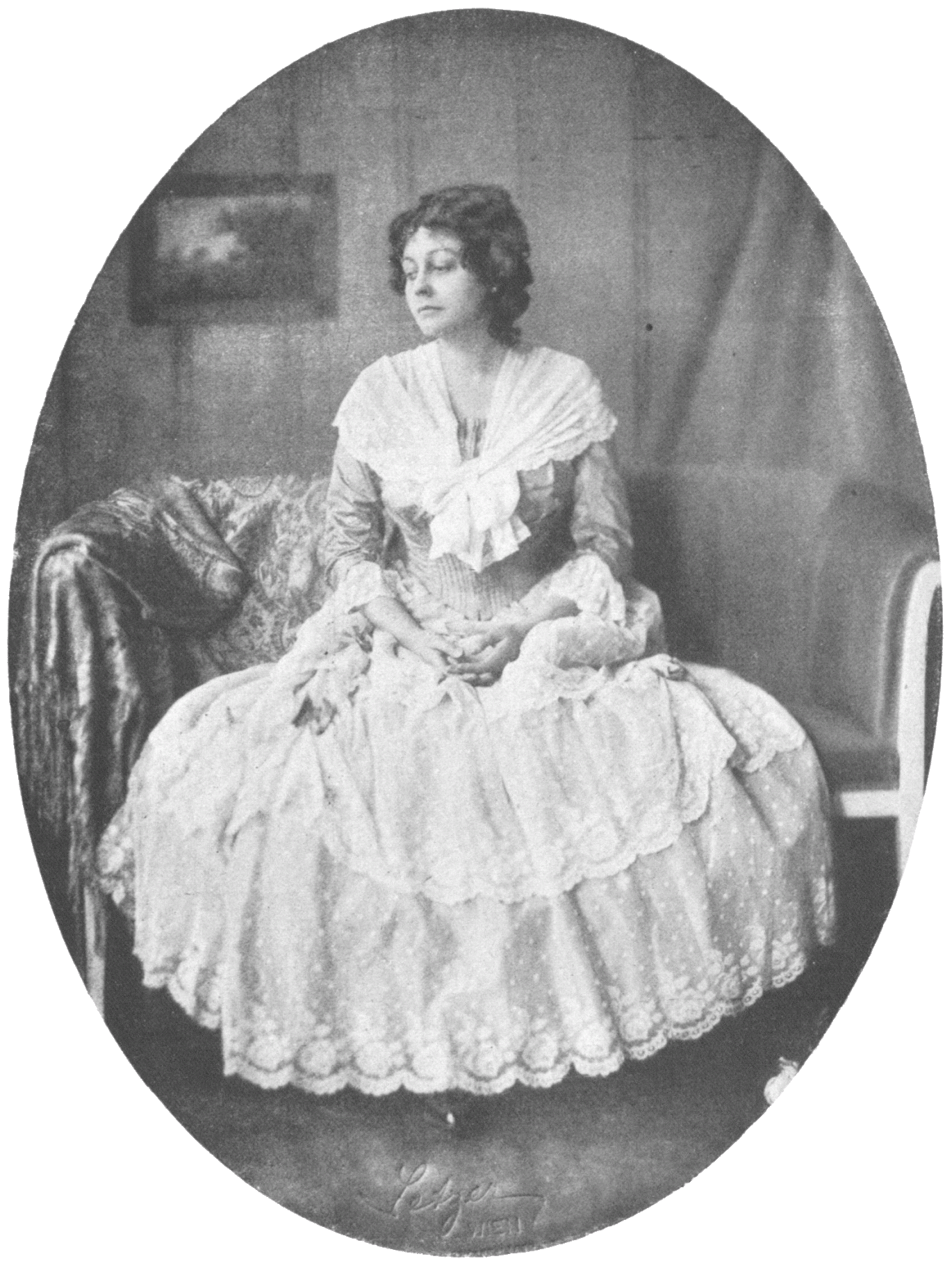
Annemarie Steinsieck, 1917.

Annemarie Steinsieck (21 September 1889 – 29 August 1977) was a German actress. She was married to actor Hugo Werner-Kahle.

== Selected filmography ==
- The Duke of Reichstadt (1920)
- Modern Vices (1924)
- Dear Homeland (1929)
- Ariane (1931)
- So Ended a Great Love (1934)
- Hermine and the Seven Upright Men (1935)
- If It Were Not for Music (1935)
- Fresh Wind from Canada (1935)
- One Too Many on Board (1935)
- A Strange Guest (1936)
- Family Parade (1936)
- The Mysterious Mister X (1936)
- A Woman of No Importance (1936)
- The Divine Jetta (1937)
- Another World (1937)
- Freight from Baltimore (1938)
- The Great and the Little Love (1938)
- Friedemann Bach (1941)
