= Anesthesia (1929 film) =

1929 film

- Directed by: Alfred Abel
- Written by: Stefan Zweig (novella); Béla Balázs
- Produced by: Alfred Abel
- Starring: Renée Héribel; Jack Trevor
- Cinematography: Günther Krampf
- Music by: Alexander Laszlo; Werner Schmidt-Boelcke
- Production company: G.P. Film
- Distributed by: Bavaria Film
- Release date: 9 September 1929
- Country: Germany
- Languages: Silent; German intertitles

Anesthesia (German: Narkose) is a 1929 German silent film directed by Alfred Abel and starring Renée Héribel and Jack Trevor.

The film's art direction was by Willy Brummer and Julius von Borsody.

== Cast ==
- Renée Héribel as Angélique Laumain
- Jack Trevor as René Vernon
- Alfred Abel as Jean
- Fritz Alberti as Ein Herr
- Bobby Burns as Kind
- Frigga Braut as Mutter
- Bruno Ziener as Arzt
- Gustav Rickelt
- Karl Platen

== Bibliography ==
- Bock, Hans-Michael; Bergfelder, Tim, eds. (2009). The Concise Cinegraph: Encyclopaedia of German Cinema. New York: Berghahn Books. ISBN 978-1-57181-655-9.
