= Jack Trevor =

British film actor and Nazi collaborator (1893–1976)

- German postcard, 1928-1929
- Born: Anthony Cedric Sebastian Steane; 14 December 1893; London, England
- Died: 19 December 1976 (aged 83); Deal, Kent, England
- Other name: Cedric Steane
- Occupation: Actor
- Years active: 1922-1943

Anthony Cedric Sebastian Steane (14 December 1893 – 19 December 1976), known by the stage name Jack Trevor, was a British film actor of the silent and early sound era. Based in Weimar (and later Nazi) Germany, he acted in 67 films between 1922 and 1943. He was later convicted of collaboration for appearing in multiple propaganda films of the Nazi regime, but his sentence was overturned on the basis that he had worked under duress.

== Early life and military service ==
Trevor was born Anthony Cedric Sebastian Steane in London in 1893, to upper-class parents. He studied at New College, Oxford, and joined the British Army, where he was posted to the Manchester Regiment. In 1915 he served in Gallipoli and later France as an acting Second Lieutenant. He was wounded in action in 1916, and was for a time invalidated out of service.

In June 1917 he absented himself when due to return to France after sick leave; and in December was convicted at the Central Criminal Court on a charge of obtaining jewellery by fraud and sentenced to 6 months imprisonment at Wormwood Scrubs. He was cashiered from the army the same month, but was re-drafted in March 1918. He subsequently deserted again in May of that year. He would later falsely claim to have won the Military Cross for his service.

== Germany and film stardom ==
Sometime after the war, he married an Austrian woman named Alma, supposedly an illegitimate daughter of Crown Prince Rudolf, who committed suicide a year into their marriage.

He moved to Berlin in 1922 following an offer by producer Frederic Zelnik, and began acting in silent films under the stage name "Jack Trevor." He was often cast as a prototypical "English gentleman" or other sophisticate, in everything from minor to major roles.

He remarried and had two sons, re-settling in Oberammergau and living off his affluent family's fortune.

== Nazi propaganda films ==
In September 1939, he was arrested and interned by the Gestapo as an enemy alien. Propaganda Minister Joseph Goebbels demanded he record English-language radio broadcasts for the regime. Though he initially refused, he later complied due to threats against himself and his family. Over the course of the war, he appeared in several propaganda films, including Carl Peters, Ohm Krüger, and My Life for Ireland.

== Post-war life and trial ==
After the surrender and dissolution of the Nazi government, Trevor surrendered himself to Allied forces. He was extradited to the United Kingdom in 1945 and interned for two years while awaiting trial for collaborationism. In 1947, he was convicted by the Central Criminal Court of "doing acts likely to assist the enemy with intent to assist the enemy" and sentenced to three years imprisonment (of a possible life sentence), but later successfully appealed the conviction, on the grounds that he was acting under duress. The case is recorded as R v Steane.

Trevor eventually moved to Deal, Kent, and died in 1976.

== Filmography ==
- Pages of Life (1922) as Lord Mainwaring
- The Grass Orphan (1922)
- Petticoat Loose (1922) as Max Lorraine
- Not for Sale (1924) as Desmond North
- The Venus of Montmartre (1925) as the Prince of Chéran
- Den of Iniquity (1925) as Hellmuth Roeder
- The Second Mother (1925) as Baron Fred Brochstädt
- Secrets of a Soul (1926) as Erich
- Love is Blind (1926) as the film director
- Cab No. 13 (1926) as François Tapin
- The Golden Butterfly (1926) as Teddy Aberdeen
- Trude (1926)
- The Great Duchess (1926) as the adventurer
- Rhenish Girls and Rhenish Wine (1927) as Baron Wendlingen
- The Love of Jeanne Ney (1927)
- Circle of Lovers (1927) as Paul Neurath
- The Hunt for the Bride (1927) as Bill Hoot
- Chance the Idol (1927) as Golding
- The Great Unknown (1927) as Major Paul Roy Amery
- Intoxicated Love (1927) as Robert Elliot
- The Prisoners of Shanghai (1927) as Consul Ralph Sinclair
- Nameless Woman (1927) as Frank Milton
- The Girl with the Five Zeros (1927) as the swindler
- The Catwalk (1927) as Baron Boreslav von Schrandens Sohn
- The Island of Forbidden Kisses (1927)
- The Devious Path (1928) as Walter Frank
- The Countess of Sand (1928)
- Rasputin, the Holy Sinner (1928) as Prince Yusupov
- The Duty to Remain Silent (1928) as Robert
- Folly of Love (1928)
- Love's Masquerade (1928) as the writer
- Modern Pirates (1928) as Major John Brent
- Champagne (1928) as the officer
- The Lady and the Chauffeur (1928) as Jan Derrik
- The Alley Cat (1929) as Jimmy Rice
- Fräulein Else (1929) as Paul
- Three Around Edith (1929) as Thomas Morland
- Anesthesia (1929) as René Vernon
- My Sister and I (1929) as Baron Udo von Ebenhausen
- The White Roses of Ravensberg (1929) as Dr. Marcel Hochwald
- Bright Eyes (1929) as Jean
- Foolishness of His Love (1929)
- The Great Longing (1930) as himself
- Two Worlds (1930) as Capitain Stanislaus
- The Song of the Nations (1931)
- A Voice Said Goodnight (1932) as Gerald Creighton
- The Five Accursed Gentlemen (1932) as Strawber
- Lily Christine (1932) as Ivor Summerset
- Hangmen, Women and Soldiers (1935) as Capitain MacCallum
- Engel mit kleinen Fehlern (1936)
- Under Blazing Heavens (1936) as Mr. Hicks
- Das schöne Fräulein Schragg (1937)
- Cause for Divorce (1937) as Fenton
- Tango Notturno (1937) as Pilot Commander
- Mirror of Life (1938)
- Women for Golden Hill (1938) as Larry
- Napoleon Is to Blame for Everything (1938) as Minister
- Police Report (1939)
- Stars of Variety (1939) as Jeffrey Keats
- Der letzte Appell (1939)
- Carl Peters (1941) as the British Consul of Zanzibar
- Uncle Kruger (1941) as British Officer
- My Life for Ireland (1941) as the president of the martial court
- Rembrandt (1942)
- The Eternal Tone (1943) as the American
- Immensee (1943) as Kellner

== See also ==
- R v Steane
