= The Weekend Bride =

1928 film

- French-language poster
- German: Die Wochenendbraut
- Directed by: Georg Jacoby
- Written by: Max Ehrlich; Friedrich Stein
- Starring: Elga Brink; Ossi Oswalda; Paul Hörbiger
- Cinematography: Eduard Hoesch
- Music by: Walter Ulfig
- Production company: Orplid-Film
- Distributed by: Messtro-Film
- Release date: 25 November 1928
- Country: Germany
- Languages: Silent; German intertitles

The Weekend Bride (German: Die Wochenendbraut) is a 1928 German silent comedy film directed by Georg Jacoby and starring Elga Brink and Ossi Oswalda. The film's sets were designed by the art director Franz Schroedter.

== Cast ==
In alphabetical order

- Elga Brink as Uschi Poehlmann
- Werner Fuetterer as Dr. Schwarzecker
- Carola Höhn
- Paul Hörbiger as secretary
- Ossi Oswalda
- Kurt Vespermann as Fritz Bornemann
