= The Fake (1927 film) =

1927 film

- Directed by: Georg Jacoby
- Written by: George A. Cooper
- Based on: The Fake; 1924 play by Frederick Lonsdale
- Produced by: Julius Hagen
- Starring: Henry Edwards; Elga Brink; Juliette Compton; Miles Mander
- Cinematography: William Shenton; Horace Wheddon
- Edited by: Ivor Montagu
- Production company: Julius Hagen Productions
- Distributed by: Williams and Pritchard Films
- Release date: September 1927
- Country: United Kingdom
- Language: English

The Fake is a 1927 British silent drama film directed by Georg Jacoby and starring Henry Edwards, Elga Brink and Juliette Compton. It is based on a 1924 play of the same title by Frederick Lonsdale. It was made at Twickenham Studios in London.

== Plot ==
An M.P. pressures his daughter to marry an aristocrat in spite of his drug addiction.

== Cast ==
- Henry Edwards as Geoffrey Sands
- Elga Brink as Mavis Stanton
- Juliette Compton as Mrs. Hesketh Pointer
- Norman McKinnel as Ernest Stanton
- Miles Mander as Honourable Gerald Pillick
- J. Fisher White as Sir Thomas Moorgate
- A. Bromley Davenport as Hesketh Pointer
- Julie Suedo as Dancer
- Ivan Samson as Clifford Howe
- Ursula Jeans as Maid
