= Malice (1926 film) =

1926 film

- Directed by: Manfred Noa
- Written by: Alfred Nelius (novel); Leo Birinsky
- Produced by: Hanns Lippmann
- Starring: Paul Wegener; Olga Chekhova; Anton Pointner
- Cinematography: Gustave Preiss
- Production company: Gloria-Film
- Distributed by: Süd-Film
- Release date: 26 February 1926
- Country: Germany
- Languages: Silent; German intertitles

Malice (German: Der Mann aus dem Jenseits) is a 1926 German silent film directed by Manfred Noa and starring Paul Wegener, Olga Chekhova and Anton Pointner. The film's art direction was by Artur Günther.

== Cast ==
- Paul Wegener as Hauptmann Römer
- Olga Chekhova as His Wife
- Anton Pointner as Leutnant Teutenberg
- Bruno Ziener as Lawyer
- Zehra Achmed
- Hans Albers
- Frigga Braut
- Jaro Fürth

== Bibliography ==
- Jennifer M. Kapczynski & Michael D. Richardson. A New History of German Cinema.
