= We're All Gamblers =

1927 film directed by James Cruze

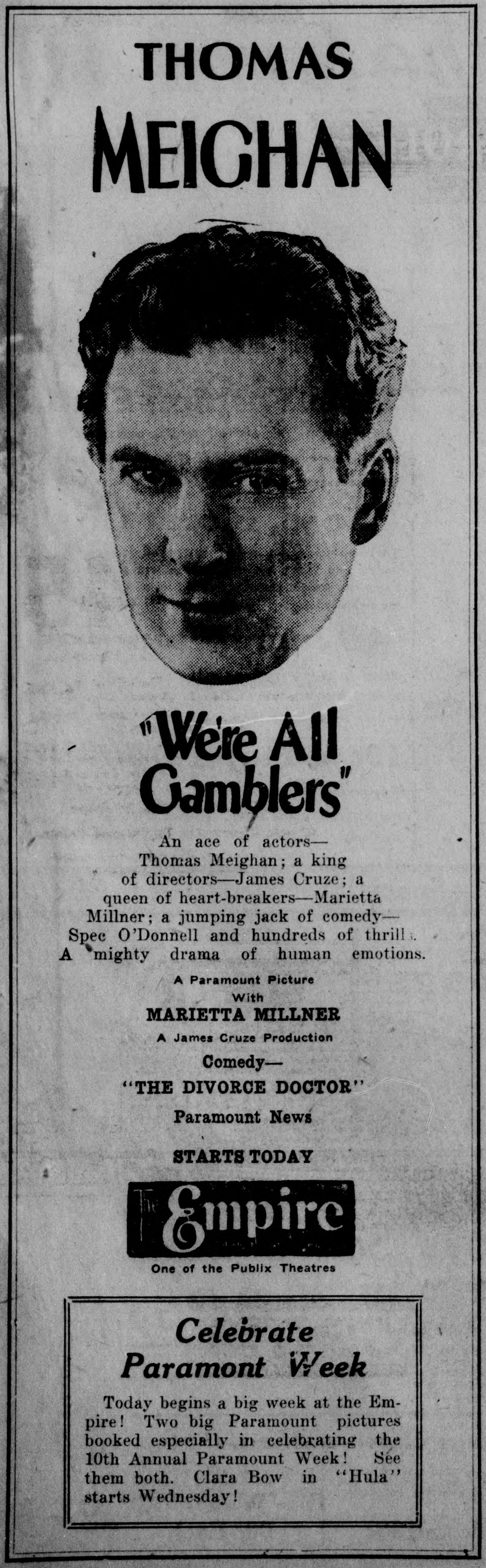
- Contemporary advertisement
- Directed by: James Cruze
- Screenplay by: John W. Conway; Hope Loring
- Based on: play, Lucky Sam McCarver, by Sidney Howard
- Produced by: James Cruze; Jesse L. Lasky; Adolph Zukor
- Starring: Thomas Meighan; Marietta Millner; Cullen Landis; Philo McCullough; Gertrude Claire; Gunboat Smith; Spec O'Donnell
- Cinematography: Bert Glennon
- Production company: Famous Players–Lasky Corporation
- Distributed by: Paramount Pictures
- Release date: September 3, 1927
- Running time: 70 minutes
- Country: United States
- Language: English

We're All Gamblers is a lost 1927 American drama silent film directed by James Cruze and written by John W. Conway and Hope Loring. The film stars Thomas Meighan, Marietta Millner, Cullen Landis, Philo McCullough, Gertrude Claire, Gunboat Smith and Spec O'Donnell. The film was released on September 3, 1927, by Paramount Pictures.

== Cast ==
- Thomas Meighan as Lucky Sam McCarver
- Marietta Millner as Carlotta Asche
- Cullen Landis as Georgie McCarver
- Philo McCullough as Monty Garside
- Gertrude Claire as Mrs. McCarver
- Gunboat Smith as Gunboat
- Spec O'Donnell as Spec
