= Modern Vices (film) =

1924 film

- Directed by: Leopold Niernberger
- Written by: Leopold Niernberger
- Starring: Nora Gregor; Annemarie Steinsieck; Hugo Werner-Kahle
- Production company: Staatliche Filmstelle
- Release date: 4 January 1924
- Country: Austria
- Languages: Silent; German intertitles

Modern Vices (German: Moderne Laster) is a 1924 Austrian silent drama film directed by Leopold Niernberger and starring Nora Gregor, Annemarie Steinsieck and Hugo Werner-Kahle. It is part of the tradition of silent era enlightenment films, which blended a mixture of documentary-style realism and melodrama in portrayals of social problems such as drugs.

It is also known by the alternative title of Narkotica.

== Cast ==
- Heinz Fischer
- Nora Gregor
- Karl Günther
- Annemarie Steinsieck
- Hugo Werner-Kahle

== Bibliography ==
- Robert Von Dassanowsky. Austrian Cinema: A History. McFarland, 2005.
