= The City Gone Wild =

1927 film directed by James Cruze

- Lobby card
- Directed by: James Cruze
- Written by: Jules Furthman (story, scenario); Charles Furthman (scenario); Herman J. Mankiewicz
- Produced by: Adolph Zukor; Jesse L. Lasky
- Starring: Louise Brooks
- Cinematography: Bert Glennon
- Distributed by: Paramount Pictures
- Release date: November 12, 1927
- Running time: 6 reels (5,408 feet)
- Country: United States
- Language: Silent (English intertitles)

The City Gone Wild is a 1927 American silent crime film produced by Famous Players–Lasky and distributed by Paramount Pictures. The film starred Thomas Meighan, Marietta Millner, and Louise Brooks and was directed by James Cruze.

== Cast ==
- Thomas Meighan as John Phelan
- Marietta Millner as Nada Winthrop
- Louise Brooks as Snuggles Joy
- Fred Kohler as Gunner Gallagher
- Duke Martin as Lefty Schroeder
- Nancy Phillips as Lefty's girl
- Wyndham Standing as Frank Ames
- Charles Hill Mailes as Luther Winthrop
- King Zany as the Bondsman
- Gunboat Smith as the Policeman

== Preservation ==
The film was shot between June 22 and July 7, 1927 at Paramount’s studio in Hollywood, with location shooting at Griffith Park in Los Angeles. Pre-release Paramount production records list the film length at 6 reels (5,601 feet) for the domestic release, and 6 reels (5,390 feet) for the foreign release.

With no prints of The City Gone Wild located in any film archives, it is a lost film. The last known copy of this film was nearly saved in the late 1960s by preservationist David Shepard for deposit at AFI. Paramount had also contracted with junk men to haul off their old rusting reels with the film still wound on. Shepard arrived at the studio just as junkmen carted the film off for disposal.
