= Modern Pirates =

1928 film directed by Manfred Noa

- Directed by: Manfred Noa
- Written by: Margarete-Maria Langen; Bobby E. Lüthge
- Starring: Jack Trevor; Marietta Millner; Sig Arno
- Cinematography: Willy Goldberger
- Production company: Noa-Film
- Distributed by: Süd-Film
- Release date: 25 October 1928
- Country: Germany
- Languages: Silent; German intertitles

Modern Pirates (German: Moderne Piraten) is a 1928 German silent comedy film directed by Manfred Noa and starring Jack Trevor, Marietta Millner, and Sig Arno.

The film's sets were designed by the art director Alexander Ferenczy. The film was considered lost until a 7 second fragment was found on May 10, 2022.

== Cast ==
- Jack Trevor as Major John Brent
- Marietta Millner as Dorothy Gordon, Filmdiva
- Sig Arno as Fredy Pitpit, Filmkomiker
- John Mylong as Henry Lincoln, Filmschauspieler
- Corry Bell as Juarez / Juanita
- Ramsay Hill as James Morton, Marine-Offizier
- Hugo Werner-Kahle as Bernardo Esperaso
- Nien Soen Ling as Chinesischer Anreißer
- Max Maximilian as Johannson, Kapitän
- Max Schreck as Philipps, Anführer
- O. Barcelona as Carlsen
- Emil Fenyő as Polizeikommissar
- Georg H. Schnell as Kapitän der Sultana
- Fritz Greiner as Der Unbekannte
- Edgar Charles as Junt-Offizier
- Nico Turoff

== Bibliography ==
- Bock, Hans-Michael; Bergfelder, Tim, eds. (2009). The Concise Cinegraph: Encyclopaedia of German Cinema. New York: Berghahn Books. ISBN 978-1-57181-655-9.
