= The Pride of the Company =

1926 film

- German: Der Stolz der Kompanie
- Directed by: Georg Jacoby
- Starring: Reinhold Schünzel; Georg H. Schnell; Camilla Spira
- Cinematography: Otto Kanturek
- Production company: Domo-Film
- Distributed by: Strauss-Film
- Release date: 25 February 1926
- Country: Germany
- Languages: Silent; German intertitles

The Pride of the Company (German: Der Stolz der Kompanie) is a 1926 German silent comedy film directed by Georg Jacoby and starring Reinhold Schünzel, Georg H. Schnell and Camilla Spira.

The film's sets were designed by the art directors Otto Erdmann and Hans Sohnle.

== Cast ==
- Reinhold Schünzel as Wilhelm - der Stolz der Kompagnie
- Georg H. Schnell as DCaptain
- Camilla Spira as Minna
- Henry Bender as sergeant
- Sig Arno as recruit #2
- Paul Morgan as recruit #2
- Kurt Vespermann as Musketier Franz
- Werner Pittschau as Leutnant Fritz von Gernsdorf
- Fritz Kampers as Sergeant Müller
- Lydia Potechina as Frau Witwe Niemeyer
- Hugo Werner-Kahle as Gutsbesitzer von Redern
- Elga Brink as Meta von Redern
- Julius Falkenstein as Oberstleutnant Erich von Falkenhagen
- Olga Engl as Karla von Wendhausen
