= Comedians of Life =

1924 film

- German: Komödianten des Lebens
- Directed by: Georg Jacoby
- Written by: Hanns Kräly; Robert Liebmann; Rudolph Stratz
- Cinematography: Curt Courant
- Production company: Georg Jacoby-Film
- Distributed by: Trianon-Film
- Release date: 27 November 1924
- Country: Germany
- Languages: Silent; German intertitles

Comedians of Life (German: Komödianten des Lebens) is a 1924 German silent film directed by Georg Jacoby and starring Elga Brink, Georg Alexander and Bruno Kastner.

The film's art direction was by Ludwig Kainer.

== Cast ==
- Elga Brink
- Georg Alexander
- Bruno Kastner
- Bob-Roy
- Martin Herzberg
- Edith Meller
- Paul Otto
- Lona Schmidt
- Willy Schröder
