= Camilla Horn =

German actress (1903–1996)

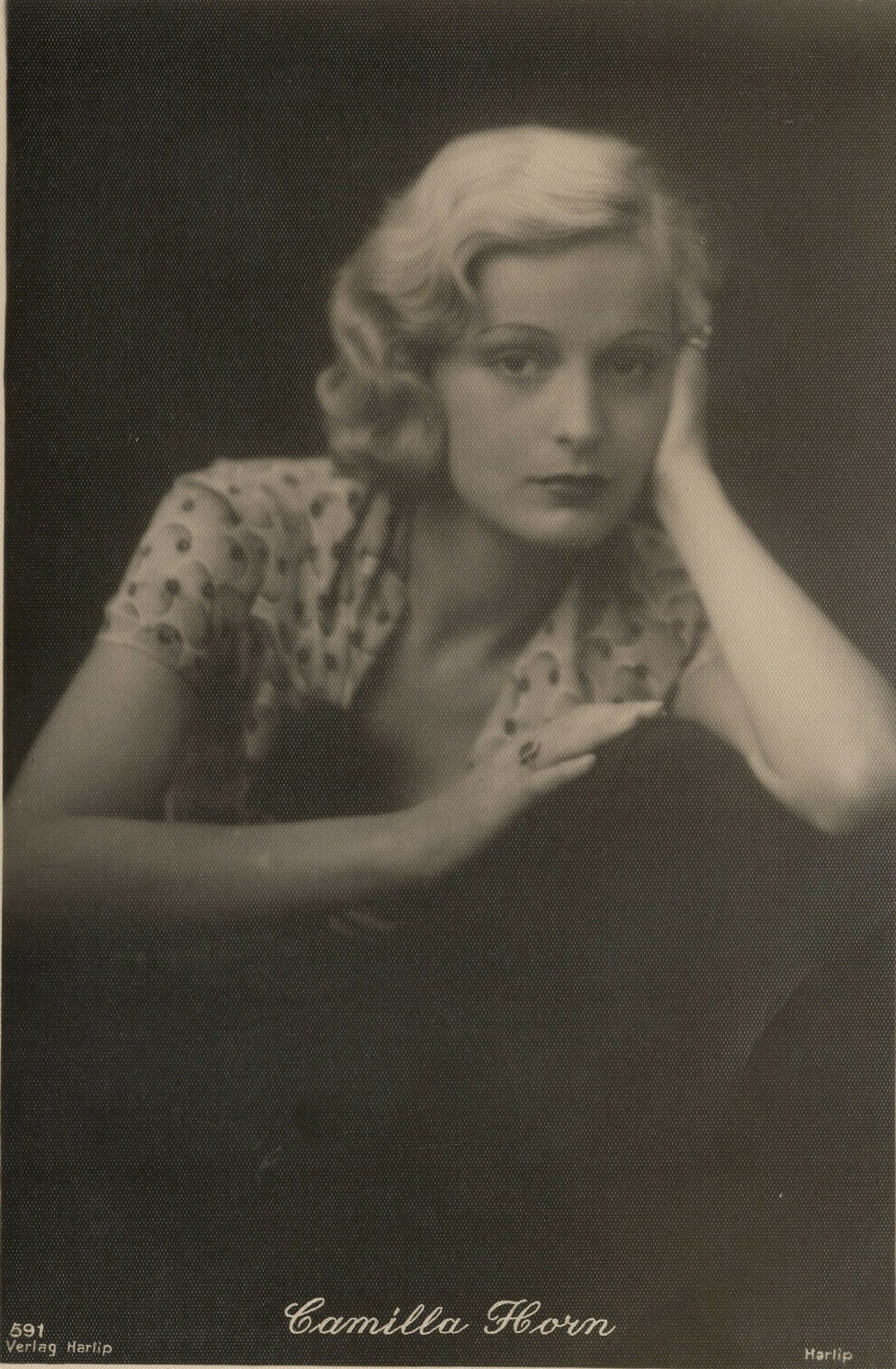
- Horn in the 1920s
- Born: 25 April 1903; Frankfurt am Main, Germany
- Died: 14 August 1996 (aged 93); Gilching, Germany
- Occupation: Actress

Camilla Martha Horn (25 April 1903 – 14 August 1996) was a German dancer and actress of the silent and sound eras. She starred in several Hollywood films of the late 1920s and in a few British and Italian productions.

== Biography ==
The daughter of a civil servant, Horn was educated as a dressmaker and worked at Erfurt.In 1926, Camilla Horn appeared as a dancer in the German film Madame Wants No Children, while Marlene Dietrich appeared as an extra, and later she was seen in a musical revue by director Alexander Korda. She made her great breakthrough in 1926, when she replaced Lillian Gish as "Gretchen" in F. W. Murnau's UFA production of Faust.

In 1928 she sailed for Hollywood, where she played opposite John Barrymore in Tempest and Eternal Love. She returned to Europe, and in the 1930s refused to follow the official line of the Nazis and was prosecuted for a monetary offense. After the war the British military court at Delmenhorst convicted herfor minor offenses (among them travelling without permission) and she was imprisoned for three months at the women's prison in Vechta.

From 1930 until her retirement in 1953, she remained a screen favorite in German, British, and Italian films, and late in life, she was invited to make her screen comeback, in the 1987's Schloss Konigswald. She spent her old age at Herrsching, and died at Gilching near Starnberg, where she had lived during the last year of her life.

Between April 1972 and February 1973 a song was written about her by the then-unsigned Bruce Springsteen. This still-unreleased song surfaced in the 1990s on a bootleg, "Early Years".

== Awards ==
- 1987 Bavarian Film Awards, Best Actress

== Selected filmography ==
- Kean (1921)
- Ways to Strength and Beauty (1925) - (uncredited)
- Tartuffe (1925)
- Faust (1926) - Gretchen / Marguerite
- Madame Wants No Children (1926) - Dancer
- The Bordellos of Algiers (1927) - Adrienne Brisson
- Eva and the Grasshopper (1927) - Camille de Saxe
- The Merry Vineyard (1927) - Clärchen Gunderloch
- The Tempest (1928) - Princess Tamara
- Eternal Love (1929) - Ciglia
- Three Around Edith (1929) - Lady Edith Trent
- The Royal Box (1929) - Alice Doren
- You'll Be in My Heart (1930) - Diane D'Artois
- Fundvogel (1930) - Esther
- Morals at Midnight (1930) - Nelly Wendt
- The Great Longing (1930) - Eva von Loe
- Hans in Every Street (1930) - Elisabeth, seine Braut
- Sunday of Life (1931) - Ellen Hobart
- The Song of the Nations (1931)
- I Go Out and You Stay Here (1931) - Gaby, Mannequin
- Reckless Youth (1931) - Lydia Thorne
- The Night Without Pause (1931) - Letta Larbo
- The Five Accursed Gentlemen (1932) - Camilla
- The Cheeky Devil (1932) - Alice Ménard
- The Return of Raffles (1932) - Elga
- Moral und Liebe (1933) - Vera
- Rund um eine Million (1933) - Lilly
- The Rakoczi March (1933) - Vilma
- The Love Nest (1933) - Fifi
- Matinee Idol (1933) - Sonia Vance
- If I Were King (1934) - Inge Winkler
- The Double (1934) - Jenny Miller
- The Big Chance (1934) - Helga, seine Tochter
- The Luck of a Sailor (1934) - Louise
- Ein Walzer für dich (1934) - Fürstin Stefanie
- The Last Waltz (1934) - Vera, ihre Nichte
- Ich sehne mich nach dir (1934) - Ivonne Brandt
- The Red Rider (1935) - Hasia Nowrowska
- White Slaves (1937) - Manja - seine Tochter
- Sein letztes Modell (1937) - Maria Várady
- Crooks in Tails (1937) - Vera Dalmatoff
- Travelling People (1938) - Pepita
- Red Orchids (1938) - Baronin Ogolenska
- Secret Mission (1938) - Marion
- Roman eines Arztes (1939) - Käthe Üding - seine Frau
- Central Rio (1939) - Diane Mercier
- Polterabend (1940) - Lissi
- Herz ohne Heimat (1940) - Dina Horster
- Die letzte Runde (1940) - Lilly
- Die keusche Geliebte (1940) - Renée Lemonier
- Friedemann Bach (1941) - Mariella Fiorini
- Vertigine (1942) - Corinna Dellys, l'amante di Alberto
- Paura d'amare (1942) - Barberina / Zia Barbara
- Angelo del crepuscolo (1942) - Anna
- Seine beste Rolle (1944) - Elise Sander
- Intimitäten (1948) - Helene
- Search for Majora (1949) - Gritt Faller
- Queen of the Arena (1952) - Diana Bianca, Dompteuse
- Father Is Being Stupid (1953) - Baronin von Baran
- Appointment in Beirut (1969) - Mrs. Evelyn Brown
- Wer weint denn schon im Freudenhaus? (1970) - Paula
- Immer bei Vollmond (1970) - Wegelins Mutter
- Der Unsichtbare (1987) - Olga Benjamin
- Schloß Königswald (1988) - FürstinGroßmutter
