= Emil Schünemann =

German cinematographer

Emil Schünemann (18 April 1882 – 26 May 1964) was a German cinematographer.

== Selected filmography ==
- In Nacht und Eis (1912)
- The Plague of Florence (1919)
- Madame Récamier (1920)
- The Spiders (1920)
- Humanity Unleashed (1920)
- The Little Napoleon (1923)
- The Fifth Street (1923)
- Aelita: Queen of Mars (1924)
- The Prince and the Maid (1924)
- A Woman for 24 Hours (1925)
- Semi-Silk (1925)
- Rags and Silk (1925)
- Upstairs and Downstairs (1925)
- The Story of Lilian Hawley (1925)
- The Old Ballroom (1925)
- The Adventurers (1926)
- Light Cavalry (1927)
- The Glass Boat (1927)
- Intoxicated Love (1927)
- Nameless Woman (1927)
- The Hunt for the Bride (1927)
- The Island of Forbidden Kisses (1927)
- The King of Carnival (1928)
- The Joker (1928)
- Rasputin (1928)
- The Beloved of His Highness (1928)
- Fight of the Tertia (1929)
- A Throw of Dice (1929)
- The Man in the Dark (1930)
- The Return of Raffles (1933)
- Maid Happy (1933)
- Manolescu, Prince of Thieves (1933)
- The Riders of German East Africa (1934)
- The Black Whale (1934)
- Artist Love (1935)
- Paul and Pauline (1936)
- Love's Awakening (1936)
- The Call of the Sea (1951)
- Anna Susanna (1953)

== Bibliography ==
- Trimborn, Jürgen. Leni Riefenstahl: A Life. Macmillan, 2007 .
