= King Zany =

American poet, lyricist, and actor (c. 1889–1939)

Charles W. Dill (c. 1889 – February 19, 1939), known as King Zany, was an American poet, lyricist, and actor.

== Early life ==
Zany was born around 1889 in Ohio. He had a brother (Joseph) and a sister.

== Film career ==
Zany starred in several films throughout the 1920s, including Hollywood, Broadway or Bust and The City Gone Wild. His acting career came to an end in the late 1920s, following back injuries sustained after horseriding.

== Poetry career ==
Zany was a popular poet within Southern Californian literary circles, speaking and reading his poems at various clubs throughout the state. He portrayed himself as a "desert poet", with his poetry collections being made from desert objects like Joshua tree wood.

As well as writing poetry, Zany published various periodicals, starting with a monthly circular called The Vagabond Voice and then a monthly newsletter of poetry and philosophy called The Desert Breeze. His poetry was featured on a 1936 KNX radio show by Jimmy McMasters.

== Personal life ==
Zany's wife, Florence, assisted in the physical creation of his poetry collections. They lived in a "desert shack" at Pearblossom, but later moved to a ranch in Ramona. The couple had a son, Charles L. Dill.

Zany died on February 19, 1939, in Ramona, aged around 50.

== Works ==
=== Films ===
- Hollywood (1923) as Horace Pringle
- Broadway or Bust (1924)
- The City Gone Wild (1927)
- The Danger Rider (1928)
- The Rainbow (1929)

=== Poetry collections ===
- Star brew from a lean-to (1936)
- Pity the Dreamless (1937)
- Carols from Cactus Land (1938)

=== Songs ===
- "All She'd Say Was Umh-Hum" (1920; with Mac Emery and Van and Schenck)
- "Coral Sea" (1920; music by Nacio Herb Brown)
- "Every Now and Then" (1929; with Don McNamee)
- "I'm Laughing" (1929; with Don McNamee, for The Great Gabbo)
