= Jumping Into the Abyss =

1933 film directed by Harry Piel

- Directed by: Harry Piel
- Written by: Hans Rameau; Werner Scheff; Harry Piel
- Produced by: Harry Piel
- Starring: Harry Piel; Elga Brink; Anton Pointner
- Cinematography: Ewald Daub
- Edited by: Max Brenner
- Music by: Fritz Wenneis
- Production company: Ariel-Film
- Release date: 30 March 1933
- Running time: 102 minutes
- Country: Germany
- Language: German

Jumping Into the Abyss (German: Sprung in den Abgrund) is a 1933 German crime film directed by Harry Piel and starring Piel, Elga Brink and Anton Pointner. The film's sets were designed by the art directors Artur Günther and Willi Herrmann.

== Cast ==
- Harry Piel as Harry Peters
- Elga Brink as Betty Bergen
- Anton Pointner as Baron Moll
- Hermann Blaß as Karl Schöning
- Gerhard Bienert as Walter Volkmann
- Hilde Hildebrand as Eva Volkmann
- Hans Ritter as Prank
- Max Diekmann as Rattke
- Camilla Spira as Anni
- Justus Glatz as Toni, ein Bergführer
- Engelbert Freudling as Geiersbacher, ein Bergführer
- Hermann Vallentin as Generaldirektor Schenk
- Georg John as Fotograf

== Bibliography ==
- Rentschler, Eric (1996). The Ministry of Illusion: Nazi Cinema and Its Afterlife. Harvard University Press. ISBN 978-0-674-57640-7.
