= R v Steane =

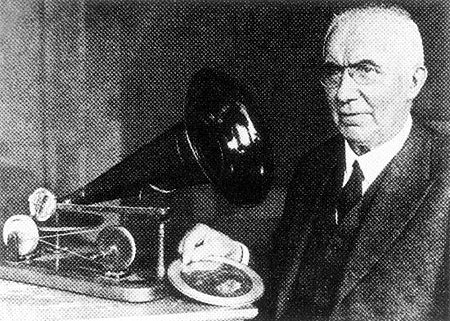
- Court: Court of Criminal Appeal
- Full case name: The Crown against (most formally Rex versus) Steane
- Decided: 1 May 1947
- Citation: 1947 KB 997
- Cases cited: None
- Legislation cited: Defence (General) Regulations, 1939, Reg. 2a

Case history
- Prior action: Conviction in Crown Court: namely the Central Criminal Court
- Subsequent action: None

Court membership
- Judges sitting: Goddard, CJ - sitting alone

Keywords
- Intent; Duress; Motive; allegedly oblique; pressures of enemy regime in wartime

R v Steane (1947) was a decision of the English Court of Criminal Appeal examining the supplemental statutory words (requirement of) "with intent to assist the enemy" in criminal liability.

== Facts ==
Jack Trevor (Steane) was an actor living in Germany leading into World War II with his wife and children. At the war's outbreak, he was arrested, assaulted and interned. He was then sent for by Joseph Goebbels, who asked him to broadcast in English on Germany's behalf. He initially refused but, being in fear of the fate of his family, relented. At the end of the war, he reported to the liberating forces and described his experiences to them. As a result, he appeared before Mr Justice Henn-Collins at the Central Criminal Court, charged with

doing acts likely to assist the enemy with intent to assist the enemy

contrary to Regulation 2A of the Defence (General) Regulations 1939, which bore a maximum sentence of life imprisonment.

The extent of broadcasting was not needed to be proven as was by admission. No expert evidence was adduced to show the broadcasts assisted the enemy or harmed the United Kingdom. It was argued by his defence team that his intention was not to assist the enemy but to secure the safety of his family.

He was convicted and sentenced to three years penal servitude.

== Appeal ==
Goddard, CJ, sitting alone, considered intention, making it clear that the prosecution bore the burden of proving the specific intent required by the definition of the offence. This point had been settled by Woolmington v. DPP in 1935. Principles were cited but no authorities in his judgement. The pivotal dictum of his

if the prosecution prove an act the natural consequences of which would be a certain result ... then a jury may ... find that the prisoner is guilty of doing the act with the intent alleged ... but, if ... there is room for more than one view as to the intent of the prisoner ... (and) if they either think that the intent did not exist or they are left in doubt as to the intent, the prisoner is entitled to be acquitted.

Goddard also referred to duress as a possible defence but ruled that it was unnecessary to consider it because of the particular conditions pertaining while he was under the control of an enemy power. He said that an inference must be drawn that the defendant intended the natural consequences of his acts merely from the fact, on the facts, that he did them, but went on to say that this did not necessarily impute a guilty intent.

He decided the appeal decrying the trial judge's summing up jury instructions, stating that the various threats to which the defendant had been exposed were not adequately put to the jury and that as a result

the jury may well have been left with the impression that, as a man must be taken to intend the natural consequence of his actions, these matters as to which he had given evidence were of no moment.

and on this basis quashed the conviction.

== Commentary ==
The decision has been analysed as of its own type and closely dependent upon the circumstances of the offence. In support a legal academic has published that applying too rigid a definition of intent/intention would remove "moral elbow-room" from the jury.

Much opprobrium is expressed that R v Steane on its face extends the traditional definition of criminal liability by adding a criterion of true or moral purpose to offences for which a specific intent must be shown (not just actus reus and mens rea).

In R v Howe, Bannister & Burke (R v Clarkson) conjoined appeals the highest domestic court held that co-murderers were liable even if they acted under a threat to their own lives, the idea of purpose being considered irrelevant, arguably obiter as the certified questions for the consecutive appeals were limited to duress — leave for such a question was denied from the senior courts as to any "oblique purpose" in the more common context of a set of facts of a violent offence.

If such leave is obtained for an offence where oblique purpose is morally defensible, such as broadcasting, or morally debatable such as in the scenario of unforeseen polluting, harming health over a long course of time in R v Cunningham, Steane's reasoning endures as a binding legal principle.
