= Elga Brink =

German actress (1905–1985)

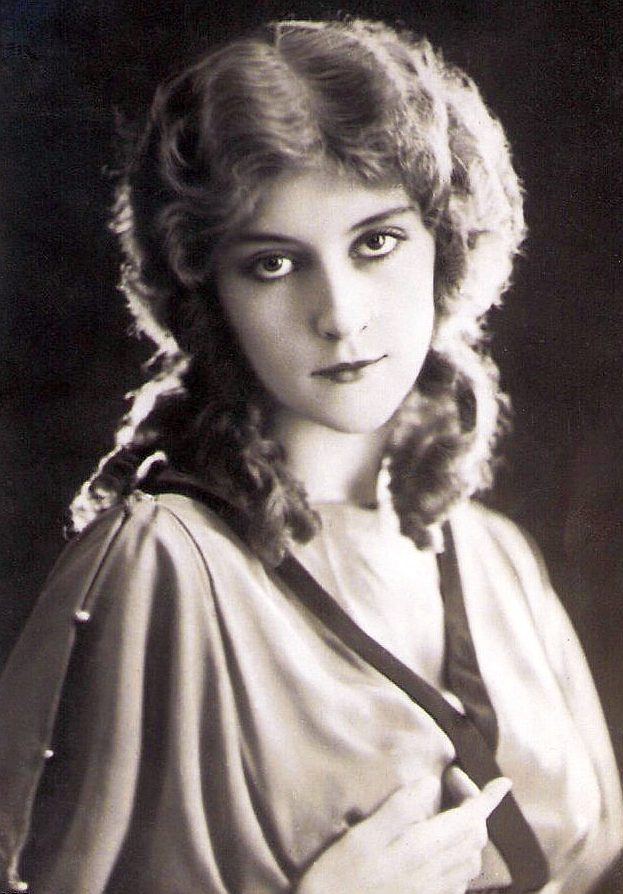
- Elga Brink in Quo Vadis, 1924
- Born: Elisabeth Margarete Frey; 2 April 1905; Berlin, German Empire
- Died: 28 October 1985 (aged 80); Hamburg, West Germany
- Occupation: Actress
- Years active: 1922–1951
- Spouse(s): Fritz Borchardt (died 1926); George Jacoby (divorced); Friedrich Goldbaum (divorced 1934); Franz Biermann (died 1949)

Elisabeth Margarete Biermann (born Frey, formerly Brink; 2 April 1905 – 28 October 1985), known professionally as Elga Brink, was a German film actress. Brink rose to prominence in the early 1920s, when she starred in many silent films. Her last silent film was Marriage in Trouble in 1928. After silent films, Brink continued acting in sound films until her retirement in 1951. Her last role was in the 1951 movie Das fremde Leben. After her retirement, Brink remarried and worked as a clerk in Hamburg until her death in 1985.

== Life ==
Elga Brink was born Elisabeth Margarete Frey in Berlin on 2 April 1905, the daughter of a banker in Berlin-Waidmannslust. Shortly after her birth, her surname was changed to Brink.

Brink attended a business school before being introduced to silent films by Albert Pommer, the brother of Erich Pommer. Her first role was in a romantic comedy Lebenshunger, where she played a supporting role alongside Ressel Orla. After several more films, Brink rose to prominence as an actress in the 1924 movie Quo Vadis. Although the tapes of the movie were considered lost, in 2012, Vatican newspaper L'Osservatore Romano reported that a copy of the film was found in the Vatican Film Library.

She starred in a number of films. Her second husband was the director Georg Jacoby, who divorced her and married actress Marika Rökk. After the Second World War Elga Brink worked on the stage until she retired in 1951. She then worked as a clerk at a law firm in Hamburg until her death in 1985.

== Filmography ==
- Lust for Life (1922)
- Between Evening and Morning (1923)
- Paradise in the Snow (1923)
- Comedians of Life (1924)
- Quo Vadis (1924)
- Cock of the Roost (1925)
- Hussar Fever (1925)
- Should We Be Silent? (1926)
- The Ride in the Sun (1926)
- Circus Romanelli (1926)
- The Pride of the Company (1926)
- Accommodations for Marriage (1926)
- Nameless Woman (1927)
- Intoxicated Love (1927)
- The Hunt for the Bride (1927)
- The Fake (1927)
- The Island of Forbidden Kisses (1927)
- The Physician (1928)
- Angst (1928)
- The Weekend Bride (1928)
- The Joker (1928)
- The King of Carnival (1928)
- The Most Beautiful Woman in Paris (1928)
- Land Without Women (1929)
- Marriage in Trouble (1929)
- Dawn (1929)
- Women on the Edge (1929)
- The Great Longing (1930)
- Josef the Chaste (1930)
- Pension Schöller (1930)
- Different Morals (1931)
- By a Nose (1931)
- Der Herr Finanzdirektor (1931)
- Im Banne der Berge (1931)
- Marshal Forwards (1932)
- Night of Temptation (1932)
- Grandstand for General Staff (1932)
- Crime Reporter Holm (1932)
- Strafsache van Geldern (1932)
- The Tunnel (1933)
- Jumping Into the Abyss (1933)
- The Hymn of Leuthen (1933)
- The Daring Swimmer (1934)
- Da stimmt was nicht (1934)
- Playing with Fire (1934)
- Uncle Bräsig (1936)
- Carousel (1937)
- The Chief Witness (1937)
- Heimatland (1939)
- In letzter Minute (1939)
- Weißer Flieder (1940)
- Quax the Crash Pilot (1941)
- Clarissa (1941)
- The Swedish Nightingale (1941)
- Voice of the Heart (1942)
- With the Eyes of a Woman (1942)
- Eines Tages (1945)
- Frühlingsmelodie (1945)
- Dr. Semmelweis (1950)
- Das fremde Leben (1951)
