= Hermann Warm =

German art director (1889–1976)

Hermann Warm was a German art director for films. Born in 1889 (died 1976) in Berlin, Germany, Warm was an important figure in the expressionist movement of the 1920s. Warm entered the German film industry in 1912 after working on-stage for a while. As well as doing set work on films such as The Cabinet of Dr. Caligari and Fritz Lang's Destiny, Warm also worked with Danish film director Carl Theodor Dreyer on films including The Passion of Joan of Arc and Vampyr. During World War II, Warm lived in Switzerland and returned to Germany in 1947.

== Selected filmography ==
- The Silent Mill (1914)
- The Tunnel (1915)
- The Dance of Death (1919)
- The Mayor of Zalamea (1920)
- Island of the Dead (1921)
- Destiny (1921)
- The Eternal Curse (1921)
- Circus of Life (1921)
- The Last Battle (1923)
- Countess Donelli (1924)
- Darling of the King (1924)
- Love Story (1925)
- The Flight in the Night (1926)
- Intoxicated Love (1927)
- Nameless Woman (1927)
- The Hunt for the Bride (1927)
- The Woman from the Folies Bergères (1927)
- The Island of Forbidden Kisses (1927)
- It Happens Every Day (1930)
- The Man Who Murdered (1931)
- Two in a Car (1932)
- When the Village Music Plays on Sunday Nights (1933)
- Pappi (1934)
- Gypsy Blood (1934)
- Peer Gynt (1934)
- I Love All the Women (1935)
- The Night With the Emperor (1936)
- A Wedding Dream (1936)
- The Citadel of Warsaw (1937)
- Dangerous Game (1937)
- Talking About Jacqueline (1937)
- An Enemy of the People (1937)
- Wozzeck (1947)
- Heart's Desire (1951)
- The Private Secretary (1953)
- The Royal Waltz (1955)
- Arms and the Man (1958)
- The Head (1959)
