= Grandstand for General Staff (1932 film) =

1932 film

- German: Der Feldherrnhügel
- Directed by: Eugen Thiele
- Written by: Roda-Roda (play); Carl Rößler (play); Jenõ Szatmári
- Starring: Iván Petrovich; Elga Brink; Betty Bird
- Cinematography: Károly Vass
- Music by: Otto Stransky
- Production company: Münchner Lichtspielkunst
- Distributed by: Bavaria Film
- Release date: 2 April 1932
- Running time: 84 minutes
- Country: Germany
- Language: German

Grandstand for General Staff (German: Der Feldherrnhügel) is a 1932 German historical comedy film directed by Eugen Thiele and starring Iván Petrovich, Elga Brink, and Betty Bird. It was shot at the Bavaria Studios in Munich. The film's sets were designed by the art director Ludwig Reiber.

== Cast ==
- Iván Petrovich as Rittmeister von Jennewein
- Elga Brink as Frau von Landiesen
- Betty Bird as Lilli Kopsch, Braut von Jennewein
- Fritz Spira as Oberst Leukfeld
- Hansi Arnstaedt as Frau Oberst Leukfeld
- Ida Perry as Gräfin Kopsch, Lillis Mutter
- Fritz Steiner as Orenstein, Bursche bei Jennewein
- Ernst Dumcke as Hoheit
- Alexander Roda Roda as Korpskommandant
- Julius Brandt as Exzellenz von Hechendorf
- Hermann Blaß as Regimentsarzt
- Julius Eckhoff as Kunitschki
- Louis Ralph as Koruga, Wachtmeister
- Ernst Morgan as Bezirkshauptmann
- Albert von Kersten as Adjutant Riedl
- Christian Bummerstaedt as v. Lützelburg, preußischer Offizier
- Walter Pittschau as Koppel, Bursche bei v. Lützelburg
- Max Hermann as Gerichtsvollzieher Petak
- Max Weydner as Mittermeyer, ein Wucherer
- Dominik Löscher as Onkel Theobald
- Edith d'Amara as Zofe der Frau Landiesen
- Fritz Schlenk as Rittmeister v. Hartenstein
- Karl Kyser as Major Türk
- Alfred von Schluga as Proviantoffizier

== See also ==
- Grandstand for General Staff (1926)
- Grandstand for General Staff (1953)

== Bibliography ==
- Krautz, Alfred (1984). International Directory of Cinematographers, Set- and Costume Designers in Film. Vol. 4. Munich: Saur. ISBN 978-3-598-21434-9.
