= Grandstand for General Staff (1926 film) =

1926 film by Hans Otto and Erich Schönfelder

- Scene from a film
- German: Der Feldherrnhügel
- Directed by: Hans Otto; Erich Schönfelder
- Written by: Alexander Roda Roda (play); Carl Rößler (play); Robert Liebmann
- Produced by: Herman Millakowsky
- Starring: Alexander Roda Roda; Harry Liedtke; Olga Chekhova
- Production companies: Greenbaum-Film; Lux-Film Wien
- Distributed by: Parufamet
- Release dates: 7 October 1926 (Berlin); 29 October 1926 (Vienna)
- Countries: Austria; Germany
- Languages: Silent; German intertitles

Grandstand for General Staff (German: Der Feldherrnhügel) is a 1926 Austrian-German silent comedy film directed by Hans Otto and Erich Schönfelder and starring Alexander Roda Roda, Harry Liedtke and Olga Chekhova. It is based on a play of the same name.

== Cast ==
- Alexander Roda Roda as Korpskomandant
- Robert Valberg as Erzherzog
- Frederick Schrecker as Regimentsarzt
- Harry Liedtke as Rittmeister Jennewein
- Maria Mindzenty as Komptesse Lilly
- Olga Chekhova as Gräfin Landieren
- Hansi Niese as Frau Oberst von Leukfeld
- Karl Forest as Feldmarschalleutnant
- Hans Moser as Regimentsschneider
- Iván Petrovich as Colonel Esterhazy
- Hans Marr
- Mizzi Zwerenz
- Hans Junkermann
- Lupu Pick

== See also ==
- Grandstand for General Staff (1932)
- Grandstand for General Staff (1953)
