= Georg Jacoby =

German film director (1882–1964)

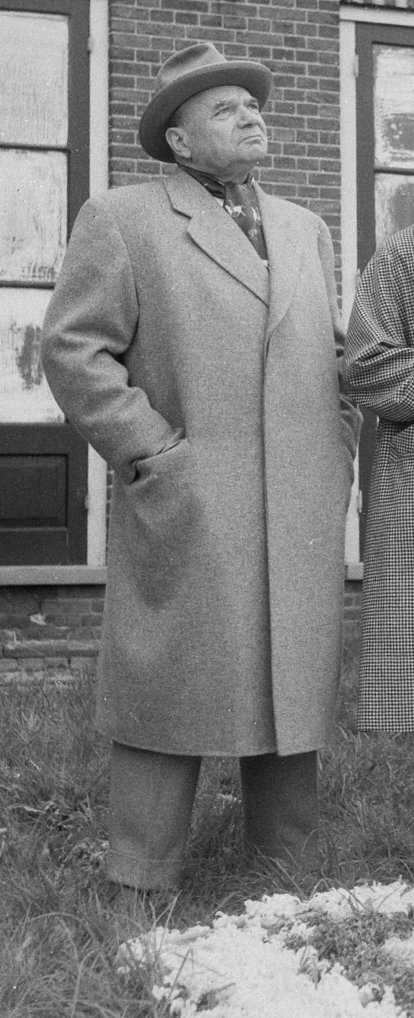
- Georg Jacoby (1953)
- Born: 23 July 1882; Mainz, German Empire
- Died: 21 February 1964 (aged 81); Munich, West Germany
- Occupations: Film director, Screenwriter
- Years active: 1913–1960
- Spouse(s): Edith Meller (m.1922, divorced); Elga Brink (divorced); Marika Rökk (m.1940)
- Children: Gabriele Jacoby

Georg Jacoby (23 July 1882 – 21 February 1964) was a German film director and screenwriter.

== Biography ==
Jacoby was born in Mainz, Germany, the son of Wilhelm Jacoby (1855–1925), a German comedic playwright, who concentrated largely on creating farces, such as The Duchess of Athens (1883) and Pension Schöller (1890), which he co-authored with Carl Laufs. Georg adapted Pension Schöller into film versions on no fewer than three occasions.

In 1923, Georg Jacoby gave Marlene Dietrich her film debut, casting her in a small role in The Little Napoleon (1923). His involvement with large-budget Italian epic Quo Vadis (1924), which was a critical and commercial disaster, damaged his reputation. He rebuilt his career by directing a series of popular comedies and musicals.

He was married to Marika Rökk from 1940 until his death. Actress Gabriele Jacoby is his daughter. During the Nazi era, Jacoby specialised in light comedies featuring Rökk. In 1941 he directed the first Agfacolor film Women Are Better Diplomats. He remained active in West Germany, directing his final film in 1960.

Georg Jacoby died, aged 81, in Munich.

== Selected filmography ==
- The Dancer (1915)
- Bogdan Stimoff (1916)
- Rübezahl's Wedding (1916)
- Unusable (1917)
- Jan Vermeulen, the Miller of Flanders (1917)
- The Flyer from Goerz (1918)
- The Seeds of Life (1918, 3 parts)
- The Carousel of Life (1919)
- The Swabian Maiden (1919)
- The Woman at the Crossroads (1919)
- Countess Doddy (1919)
- Superstition (1919)
- The Teahouse of the Ten Lotus Flowers (1919)
- Out of the Depths (1919)
- Temperamental Artist (1920)
- Hundemamachen (1920, writer)
- Va banque (1920, writer)
- The Woman Without a Soul (1920)
- Indian Revenge (1920)
- Wibbel the Tailor (1920, writer)
- The Sins of the Mother (1921)
- Peter Voss, Thief of Millions (1921, 6 parts)
- His Excellency from Madagascar (1922, 2 parts)
- The Big Shot (1922)
- The Girl with the Mask (1922)
- The Little Napoleon (1923)
- Paradise in the Snow (1923)
- Quo Vadis (1924)
- Comedians of Life (1924)
- Hussar Fever (1925)
- Cock of the Roost (1925)
- Accommodations for Marriage (1926)
- The Pride of the Company (1926)
- Circus Romanelli (1926)
- The Bordello in Rio (1927)
- The Fake (1927)
- Nameless Woman (1927)
- Intoxicated Love (1927)
- The Hunt for the Bride (1927)
- The Island of Forbidden Kisses (1927)
- The Weekend Bride (1928)
- Behind Monastery Walls (1928)
- The Joker (1928)
- Angst (1928, producer)
- The Physician (1928)
- Perjury (1929)
- Women on the Edge (1929)
- A Mother's Love (1929)
- Latin Quarter (1929)
- Money on the Street (1930)
- A Thousand Words of German (1930)
- The Widow's Ball (1930)
- Josef the Chaste (1930)
- Pension Schöller (1930)
- Cadets (1931)
- Storm in a Water Glass (1931)
- Hooray, It's a Boy! (1931)
- The Spanish Fly (1931)
- Melody of Love (1932)
- The Big Bluff (1933)
- Tell Me Who You Are (1933)
- The Last Waltz (1934)
- A Girl Whirls By the World (1934)
- The Daring Swimmer (1934)
- Police Report (1934)
- Tales from the Vienna Woods (1934)
- The Csardas Princess (1934)
- Marriage Strike (1935)
- The Beggar Student (1936)
- Gasparone (1937)
- The Chief Witness (1937)
- A Night in May (1938)
- The Curtain Falls (1939)
- Kora Terry (1940)
- Women Are Better Diplomats (1941)
- The Woman of My Dreams (1944)
- Child of the Danube (1950)
- Sensation in San Remo (1951)
- The Csardas Princess (1951)
- Pension Schöller (1952)
- The Divorcée (1953)
- Mask in Blue (1953)
- Hooray, It's a Boy! (1953)
- Hello, My Name is Cox (1955)
- Three Girls from the Rhine (1955)
- Three Days Confined to Barracks (1955)
- Kleren Maken de Man (1957)
- The Schimeck Family (1957)
- At Green Cockatoo by Night (1957)
- The Night Before the Premiere (1959)
- Pension Schöller (1960)
- Bombs on Monte Carlo (1960)

== Bibliography ==
- Grange, William. Historical Dictionary of German Theater. Scarecrow Press, 2006.
