= La Peur (1936 film) =

1936 film by Victor Tourjansky

La Peur, also known under the title Vertige d'un soir, is a 1936 French film by Russian director Viktor Tourjansky. The film is based on Joseph Kessel's adaptation of the story Fear by Stefan Zweig.
