= EFA Studios =

Historic film studios in Berlin

The interior of the EFA Studios in 1923.

The EFA Studios or Halensee Studios were film studios located in the Berlin suburb of Halensee. They were a prominent centre of film production in the silent and early sound era. Constructed in 1919 after the First World War, they were part of a wave of modern studios that used artificial lighting rather than the earlier glasshouse studios that relied on natural light. Early productions included The Head of Janus by F.W. Murnau. They were located close to Berlin Zoo and were sometimes also known as the Zoo Studios.

In 1921 the Europäische Film-Allianz (EFA) took over the studios. Led by Paul Davidson, former head of PAGU, the company had ambitious plans to challenge the largest film companies in Europe and America. The company produced several epics directed by Ernst Lubitsch and featuring two of Germany's biggest stars of the era Pola Negri and Emil Jannings. After the EFA outfit folded Lubitsch, Negri and several other key figures emigrated to the United States. Nonetheless the studios continued to be known as EFA. Several films with the popular actress Henny Porten were shot there.

In 1925 the studios shifted to the nearby Cicerostrasse, with the redesigned studios constructed by the architect Jürgen Bachmann. A variety of independent producers used the facilities. In 1930 the Halensee Studios were converted to produce sound films in line with the rest of the film industry. They remained in use during the Nazi era until they were destroyed during the Second World War.

== Bibliography ==
- Allred, Mason Kamana. Weimar Cinema, Embodiment, and Historicity: Cultural Memory and the Historical Films of Ernst Lubitsch. Taylor & Francis, 2017.
- Ganeva, Mila . Women in Weimar Fashion: Discourses and Displays in German Culture, 1918–1933. Camden House, 2008.
