= Das Opfer =

Das Opfer may refer to:

- The Sacrifice (1918 film)
- Das Opfer, a 1937 opera by Winfried Zillig
- Das Opfer, opera in 1 act by Emil von Reznicek on a libretto by Poul Knudsen (composed 1932)
