= Hotel Zipser =

Coordinates: 48.210944°N 16.351652°E

Hotel Zipser (Austerer & Co Gesellschaft m.b.H.)
- Interactive map of the Hotel Zipser (Austerer & Co Gesellschaft m.b.H.) area

General information
- Location: Lange Gasse, Vienna, Austria
- Opening: 1904
- Owner: Bernhard Austerer (Owner)

Design and construction
- Developer: Karoline Zipser

Other information
- Number of rooms: 55

Website
- zipser.at

The Hotel Zipser is located in the Lange Gasse in the 8th district of Vienna. The hotel is a member of the PrivateCityHotels Group.

== History ==
In the 19th century, the houses “Zum Heiligen Anton” and later “Zur Goldenen Ente” (registration 113/1846) stood here.

Ms. Karoline Zipser's home for young girls was completed in 1904 at what is today Lange Gasse No. 49. Alterations were made soon thereafter, converting it to the Pension Zipser with eleven single and two double rooms.

The Austrian writer Ödön von Horváth lodged in the Pension Zipser a number of times between 1920 and 1931, which he also references in his book Tales from the Vienna Woods.

Hedwig Austerer bought the pension in 1967 and extended the 28 rooms at that time to a total of 53. Manfred Austerer took over his parents’ business in 1972. Manfred and his wife Elisabeth Austerer renovated and altered the building over the years. Their younger son, Bernhard Austerer, joined the family business in 1999. Ongoing extensions and modernisation finally transformed the Pension Zipser into today's Hotel Zipser.

== Coat of arms ==
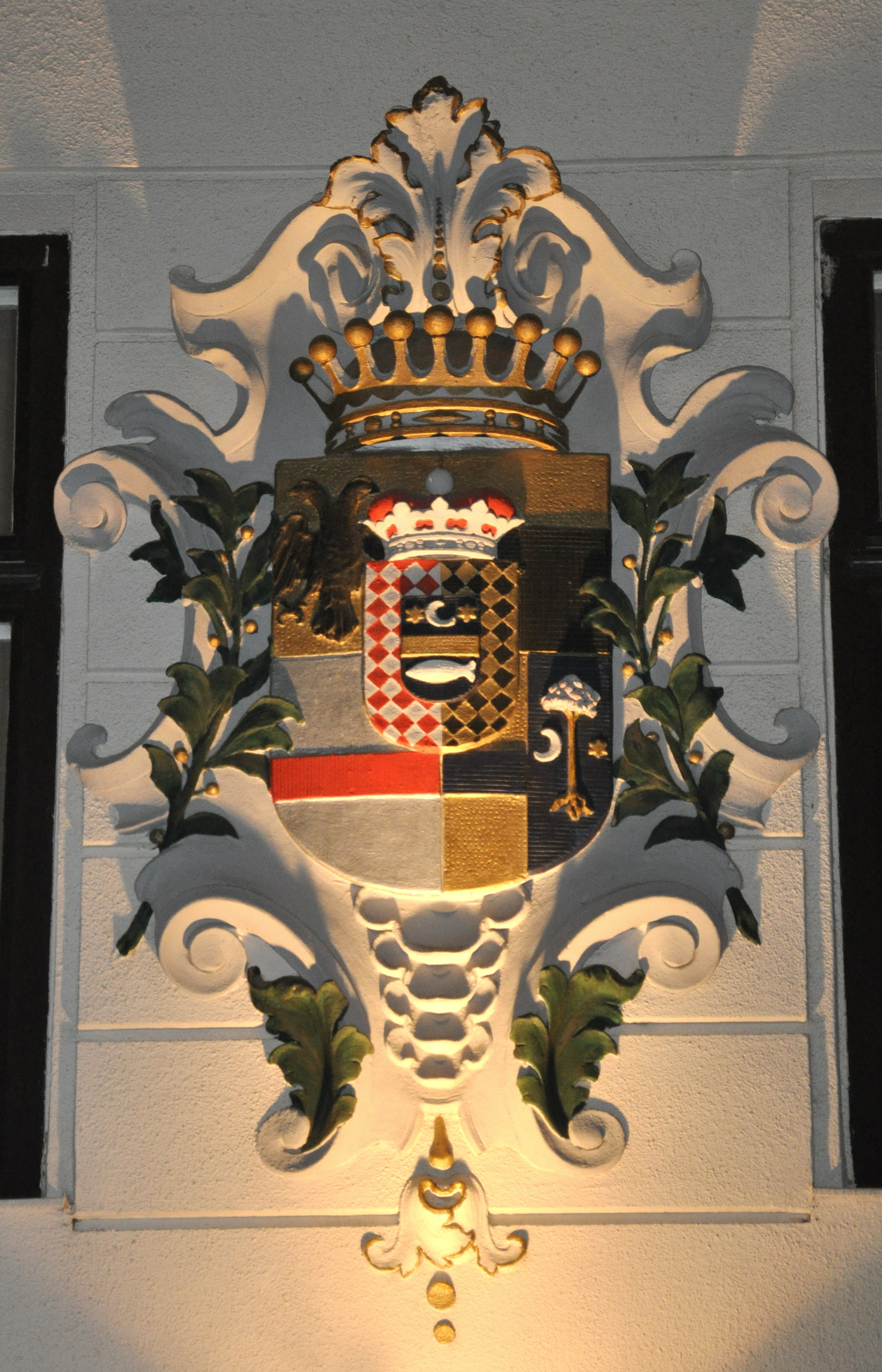
The coat of arms on the front of the hotel

The coat of arms on the façade of the building has the coat of arms of the French community Orsay at its centre.

== Literature ==
References:

- Traugott Krischke: Horváth-Chronik. Suhrkamp Verlag, 1988, S.29, S.70
- Traugott Krischke: Horváths „Geschichten aus dem Wiener Wald“. Suhrkamp Verlag, 1983, S.36
- Jürg Amann: Zimmer zum Hof. Haymon Verlag, 2006, S.14
