= Mikosch Comes In =

Mikosch Comes In may refer to:

- Mikosch Comes In (1928 film), a German silent comedy film
- Mikosch Comes In (1952 film), a West German comedy film
