= Truus van Aalten =

Dutch actress (1910–1999)

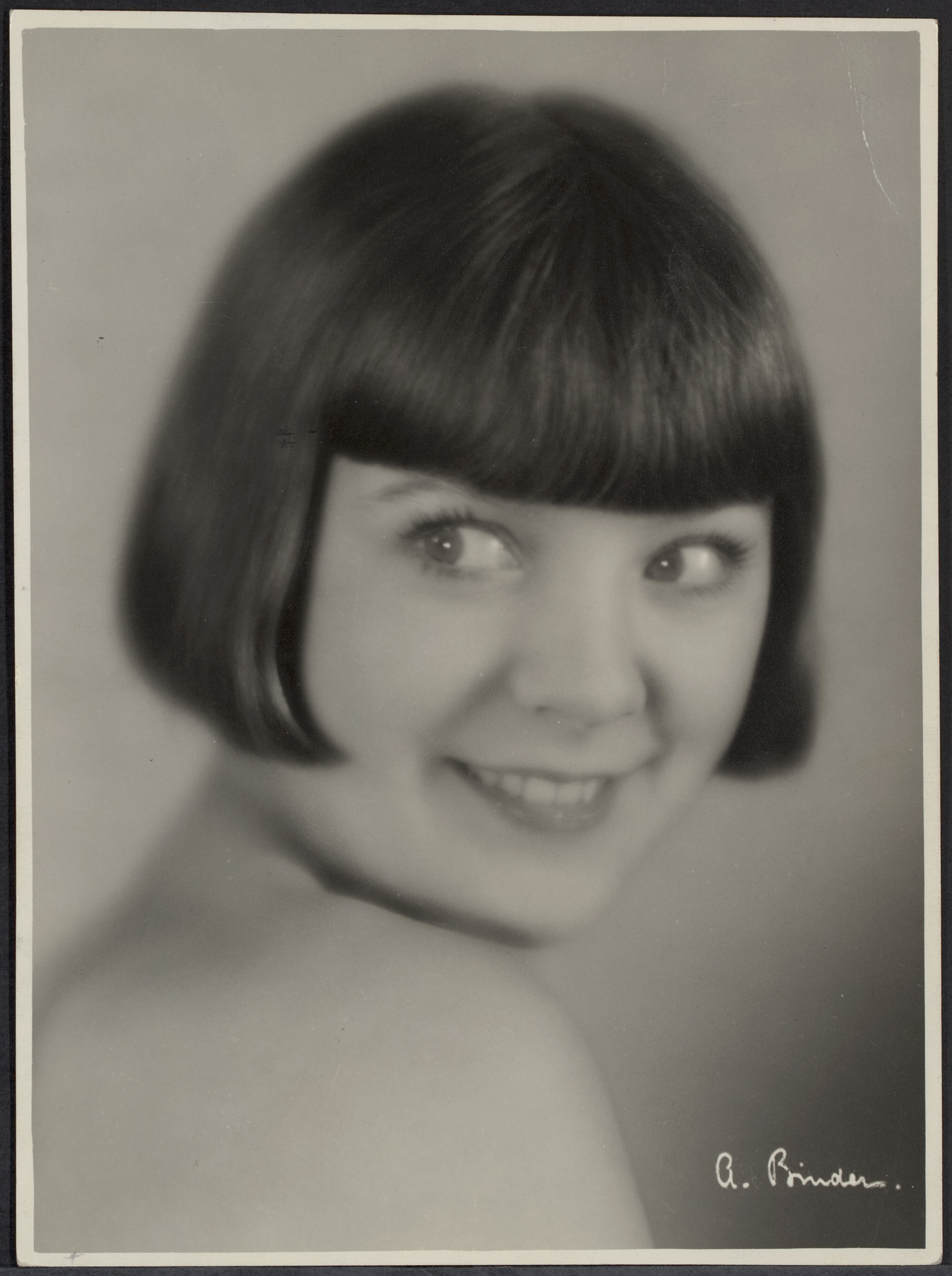
- van Aalten in 1920s
- Born: Geertruida Everdina Wilhelmina van Aalten; August 2, 1910; Arnhem, Netherlands
- Died: June 27, 1999 (aged 88); Warmond, Netherlands
- Years active: 1926–1939

Geertruida Everdina Wilhelmina van Aalten (August 2, 1910 – June 27, 1999) was a Dutch actress who appeared in many German films in the 1920s and 1930s.

== Biography ==
=== Early life ===
Van Aalten was born on August 2, 1910, in Arnhem family of a Geertruida van den Anker and pharmacist Franciscus (Frans) van Aalten. van Aalten found a job with a milliner after school, then trained as a salesgirl at a fashion store in Amsterdam. She passionately wanted to be a movie actress, but very few films were made in the Netherlands at the time.

=== Early career with Ufa ===
In 1926, van Aalten entered a beauty competition in a Dutch magazine, which would give her the chance to audition for a part in a real movie in Berlin if she won. Not long after, she was summoned to the German capital for an audition - along with two hundred other girls. Van Aalten had never had an acting lesson in her life, and she was the youngest entrant, so she didn't expect to win, but when the director saw her screen tests, van Aalten's good humor shone through, and she got the job.

Like its counterparts in California, Rome and New York, Ufa was run like a factory, where scripts were written, scenes were shot in big, barn-like studios, and editors assembled printed footage in cutting rooms. There were plasterers' workshops, carpentry shops, prop stores, hair and wardrobe departments, and publicity offices planning the release of completed movies (Ufa ran 3,000 cinemas, admitting nearly a million people a day). Van Aalten met the other members of the cast - her six "sisters" (including English actress Betty Balfour) and Willy Fritsch as Count Horkay., and she soon fell in love with Fritsch.

While van Aalten's German was wobbly at best, she was sparkly and funny and camera-friendly, so Ufa offered to train van Aalten and put her in more films, and presented her father with a contract, which he signed, so van Aalten moved to Berlin. At Ufa, van Aalten was introduced to a major figure in her life, highly respected actress Olga Chekhova, who became her unofficial mentor and mother-figure in the industry. van Aalten adored Chekhova, later citing her as a major influence both personally and professionally. Nicknaming her "Trulala", Chekhova taught her the disciplines of movie work and encouraged her to approach her work more seriously. She also pressured van Aalten to lose weight, begging "Have you done any exercises yet today, Trulala? Which ones? For how long? Go get a copy of 'Eat Well And Stay Healthy' - we can't use fat girls in films!"

Ufa cast van Aalten in the film His Late Excellency in 1927. It starred Willy Fritsch, Max Hansen and Olga Chekhova, and was directed by William Thiele.

While van Aalten had a dress made in preparation for the premiere of A Sister of Six, she was distraught to find that the film had been edited severely to get it to length, and her scenes had been shortened or cut altogether. Despite this, she decided to stay in Berlin and make a career as an actress, and Ufa continued to employ her for the following year, after which she worked for various other film companies.

Van Aalten's stardom meant that she was asked to appear in advertisements, and earned a surprising amount of money endorsing Bubisan hair products and Marylan face cream. Van Aalten had a distinctive look, with a mixture of boyish yet feminine energy which was characteristic of the 1920s. Her sharply bobbed hair and uninhibited style owed a lot to American comic actress Colleen Moore, who'd appeared in her first film in 1916.

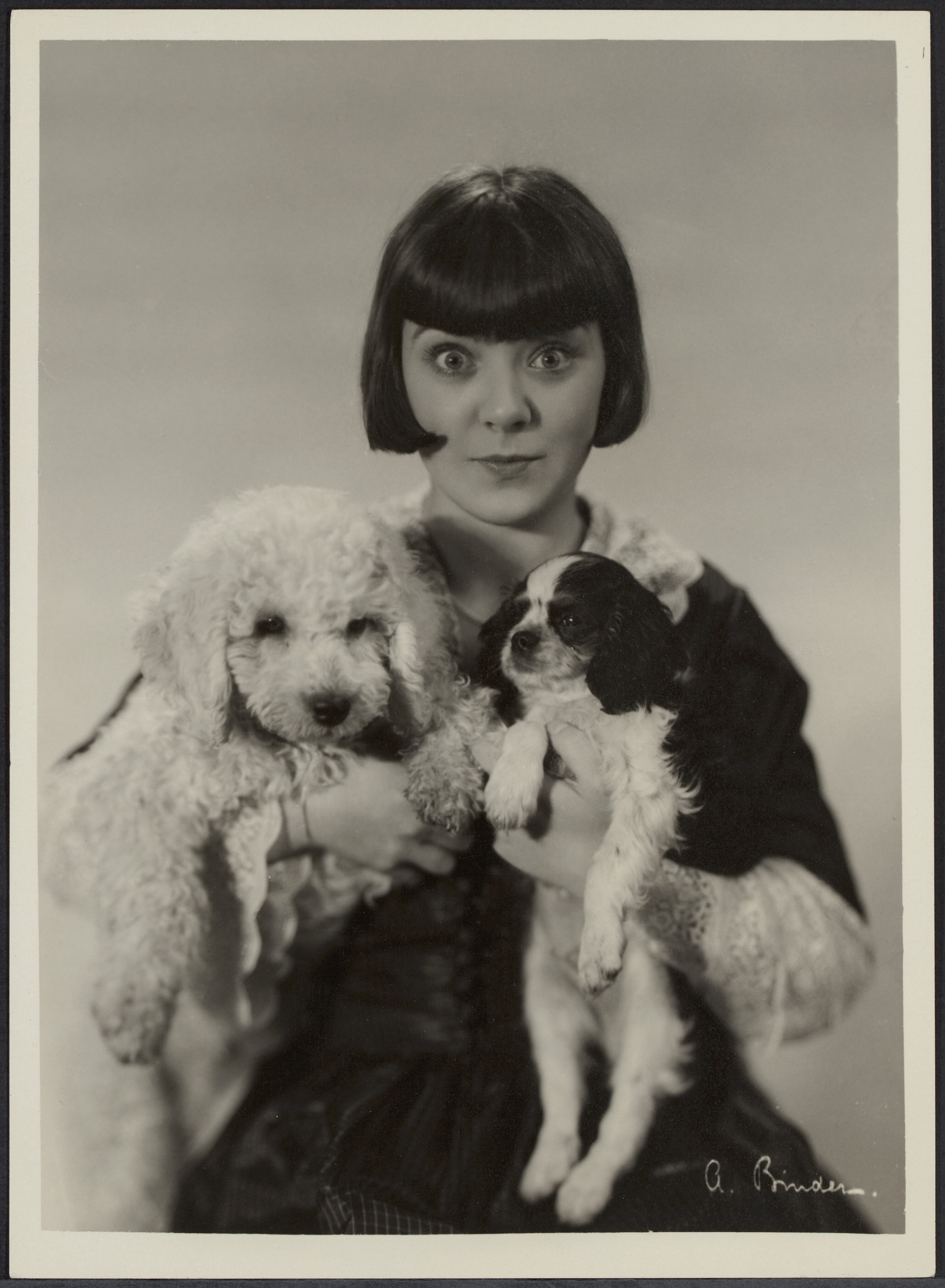
van Aalten in the 1920s

Van Aalten's experience and fanbase grew as she continued to make films. In 1928 alone, van Aalten worked on Six Girls and a Room for the Night, When the Guard Marches, Leontine's Husbands, The Happy Vagabonds and A Modern Casanova. The film-making community adored her, and referred to her affectionately as "die kleine Hollandische Käse" (The Little Dutch Cheese). A 1927 article about her in the Dutch weekly magazine "Het Leven" ("Life") described her as a "spirited, comical talent who's winning all hearts in Germany," and said that "She's a young thing who's passionately wrapped up in film, and she's chasing round the Ufa lot in the Kochstrasse like a real rascal, making it a dangerous place with her tricks and happy laughter". In 1929, van Aalten appeared in I Lost My Heart on a Bus, Jenny's Stroll Through Men and Gentlemen Among Themselves. Also in 1929, she starred in The Eccentric alongside one of Germany's comedy giants, Karl Valentin. Valentin, a hypochondriac, was sometimes troublesome to work with, but he gave van Aalten third billing after Liesl Karlstadt, his longterm working partner.

=== Talkies ===
Van Aalten's 1930 film O Mädchen, mein Mädchen, wie lieb' ich Dich! ("Oh Girlie, My Girlie, How I Love You!") was to be one of Germany's last silent films, but she successfully made the transition to talking pictures, with public excusing her Dutch accent and she (unlike a number of her contemporaries) continued to work. Film magazines featured articles about "das Mädchen aus Holland" (that girl from Holland), publisher Ross Verlag (and others) issued postcards of her, and tobacco companies used her face on collectors' album cards.

Van Aalten was a particular favourite in the Netherlands, where she was hailed as the local girl who'd become a film star. They called her Truusje ("Truusie"), an affectionate form of her name. She wasn't just popular in Europe, either - she was building a following across the Atlantic too. German-language cinemas in New York and many other cities showed all the big German movies, though sometimes a couple of years after their European releases.

Van Aalten's 1930 film Susanne macht Ordnung ("Susanne Cleans Up") proved very popular both in Germany and in America. For the first time, van Aalten got top billing for her part as Susanne Braun, a 17-year-old orphan attending a Swiss boarding school. The film, a musical comedy, was reviewed by the New York Times in October 1931: "With the arrival at the Belmont of Truus von (sic) Aalten, as the stellar performer in Susanne Macht Ordnung, those understanding German will have an opportunity of enjoying the work of an excellent young screen actress," the reviewer wrote, adding that van Aalten was "alert and interesting" in her role. "The banking concern of which Susanne's father is a member is in distress, and can be saved only through his marriage to the adipose sister of the firm's heaviest creditor. He is about to consent to the marriage, when Susanne's arrival causes great confusion. It seems impossible for her to ascertain who is her father and finally she gives up the investigation, refusing the protection of the man who really is her father. But all is not lost, for Robert, who has had his own troubles trying to find Susanne in Berlin, encounters her eventually and all is well."

Another 1930 film in which van Aalten appeared were Headfirst into Happiness and Darling of the Gods, which was produced by Ufa's top producer, Erich Pommer. The film starred Emil Jannings, the first recipient of the Academy Award for Best Actor, who'd just completed The Blue Angel with Marlene Dietrich. Van Aalten's German had improved by then- one interviewer quipped that "she occasionally mixes up 'mir' and 'mich', but felt that this was excusable since "that happens to even the best linguists!".

By 1931, van Aalten was living in her own fourth-floor apartment in Berlin's Königin-Augusta-Straße, overlooking a canal. Her friends called her flat "The Nursery" - a ribbon-strewn, white-painted place with posters on the walls, shared with Pucki (her Airedale terrier), Didi (a Maltese dog) and a Cyprian cat (whose name has not survived). Also among Truus' prized possessions were a gramophone and a glass cabinet filled with souvenirs from the Netherlands.

That same year, van Aalten worked for director Georg Jacoby on two projects, first on an Ufa short film called Eine Ideale Wohnung ("An Ideal Flat"), and then on his Tales from the Vienna Woods. Shot in Austria, the film was a musical with tunes by Johann Strauss. Musicals were extremely popular, and Viennese operettas could always find an enthusiastic German audience. The New York Times called Tales from the Vienna Woods "a tasty mélange of comedy and music", and mentioned "the little Dutch actress". She and Lien Deyers were among the few Dutch film stars of the era.

1934 saw van Aalten in the Netherlands, starring in her only film in Dutch, Het Meisje met den Blauwen Hoed ("The Girl In The Blue Hat"). The rise of the talkie had increased local demand for Dutch films, and the Netherlands' film industry was thriving.

However, the rise of the Nazi German government severely impeded her career. It wasn't until 1939, that van Aalten was offered another film part, the widow Anni in Ein ganzer Kerl ("A Regular Chap").

=== Return to the Netherlands ===
In the autumn of 1940, van Aalten returned to live in the Netherlands now under German occupation. She was offered roles in Dutch films, but refused to appear in projects which would be controlled and censored by the Nazis. Once the war ended, the German film industry that van Aalten had relied on had been completely transformed, and Ufa was gone. Van Aalten tried to find acting work in the Netherlands, then in England, but in the economically depressed atmosphere of post-war Britain, she could not find work as an unknown actress with a foreign accent, and van Aalten never acted again.

=== Later life ===
In 1954, van Aalten lived in Voorhout, a town in the western Netherlands, and set up what became a successful business importing and exporting souvenirs and promotional items.

In 1972, Dutch TV transmitted a four-part version of "Het meisje met den blauwen Hoed" ("The Girl In The Blue Hat"), an update of van Aalten's 1934 film. She was not mentioned by textbooks on German film like "The BFI Companion to German Cinema", "Das gab's nur einmal" and "The German Cinema Book", but a 1987 book by European culture expert Kathinka Dittrich, "Achter het doek" ("Behind The Screen"), helped bring the story of Dutch movie history of the 1920s and 1930s back to public knowledge.

Van Aalten' old age was marred by bouts of mental illness, and she spent her last two years at a psychiatric clinic in the village of Warmond, where she died on the 27th of June 1999, aged 88.

Very few of Truus van Aalten's films have ever been released for home viewing. One possible reason is that the Russian Army seized the Ufa studios in April 1945 and appropriated the contents, including copies of a huge number of German films that have never been seen since.

== Filmography ==
Year	Film	Role	Notes
1926	A Sister of Six		Uncredited
1927	His Late Excellency		
1928	Sajenko the Soviet	Lilian, Edward's sister	
1928	Six Girls and a Room for the Night		
1928	When the Guard Marches	Steffi	
1928	Leontine's Husbands		
1928	A Modern Casanova	Veronika Abendroth	
1929	The Happy Vagabonds		
1929	Jenny's Stroll Through Men	Anny, apprentice	
1929	I Lost My Heart on a Bus		
1929	Gentlemen Among Themselves		
1929	The Eccentric	Anni	
1930	O Mädchen, mein Mädchen, wie lieb' ich Dich!	Kitty	
1930	Only on the Rhine	Lore, Hanne's friend	
1930	Darling of the Gods		
1930	Pension Schöller	Grete, their daughter	
1930	Susanne Cleans Up	Susanne Braun	
1931	Kasernenzauber	Rosl	
1931	Headfirst into Happiness	Lily	
1931	The Beggar Student	Bronislava	
1931	Ausflug ins Leben	Alma Marfield, office miss	
1932	Teilnehmer antwortet nicht	Erika Becker	
1933	Eine ideale Wohnung		Short film
1934	Tales from the Vienna Woods	Mary Limford	
1934	Het Meisje met den Blauwen Hoed	Betsie	Dutch film
1939	A Regular Fellow	Anni, young widow	
