= The Country Schoolmaster =

The Country Schoolmaster may refer to:

- The Country Schoolmaster (1933 film), a 1933 German drama film
- The Country Schoolmaster (1954 film), a 1954 West German drama film
