= The Happy Vagabonds =

1929 film

- Directed by: Jacob Fleck; Luise Fleck
- Written by: Max Ehrlich; Ida Jenbach; Bobby E. Lüthge
- Produced by: Liddy Hegewald
- Starring: Georg Alexander; Lotte Lorring; Ernö Verebes
- Cinematography: Eduard Hoesch
- Production company: Hegewald Film
- Distributed by: Hegewald Film
- Release date: 1929
- Country: Germany
- Languages: Silent; German intertitles

The Happy Vagabonds (German:Die lustigen Vagabunden) is a 1929 German silent film directed by Jacob Fleck and Luise Fleck and starring Georg Alexander, Lotte Lorring and Ernö Verebes.

The film's art direction was by Jacek Rotmil.

== Cast ==
- Georg Alexander as Fürst Adolar Gilka
- Lotte Lorring as Tütü, Revuestar
- Ernö Verebes as August Fliederbusch, Landstreicher
- Truus Van Aalten as Bertha, seine Weggenossin
- Gyula Szőreghy as Lajos von Geletnecky
- Adolphe Engers as Alois Gradwohl, Wirt
- Hilde Maroff as Anna, seine Tochter
- Leo Peukert as Ferdinand Niggerl, Hotelbesitzer
- Willi Forst as Roland, Richter
- Hermann Picha as Kampl, Gerichtsdiener
- Karl Falkenberg

== Bibliography ==
- Bock, Hans-Michael & Bergfelder, Tim. The Concise CineGraph. Encyclopedia of German Cinema. Berghahn Books, 2009.
