= A Modern Casanova =

1928 German film

- German film poster
- German: Der moderne Casanova
- Directed by: Max Obal; Rudolf Walther-Fein
- Written by: Franz Rauch
- Produced by: Gabriel Levy
- Starring: Harry Liedtke; María Corda; Ernö Verebes
- Cinematography: Edoardo Lamberti; Guido Seeber
- Music by: Bernard Homola
- Production company: Aafa-Film
- Distributed by: Aafa-Film
- Release date: 16 November 1928
- Running time: 95 minutes
- Country: Germany
- Languages: Silent; German intertitles

A Modern Casanova (German: Der moderne Casanova) is a 1928 German silent romantic comedy film directed by Max Obal and Rudolf Walther-Fein and starring Harry Liedtke, María Corda and Ernö Verebes. It was shot at the Staaken Studios in Berlin. The film's art direction was by Botho Hoefer and Hans Minzloff.

== Cast ==
- Harry Liedtke as Dr. Christian Friedhold
- María Corda
- Ernö Verebes
- Lydia Potechina as Frau Lydia Abendroth
- Vivian Gibson
- Truus Van Aalten as Veronika Abendroth
- Trude Berliner as Nina Ly
- Valeria Blanka as Frau Werner, director
- Colette Brettel as Trude Krauss
- Lya Christy
- Vala De Lys as Charlotte, Zofe
- Hugh Douglas as Dr. Arnstedt
- Lia Eibenschütz as Lieselotte Abendroth
- Johanna Ewald as Auguste, Dienstmädchen bei Abendroth
- Manfred Koempel-Pilot as Egon Mannstadt
- Viktor Kowarzik as Bobby Berndt
- Irene Parma as Violette 'Casanovas', secretary
- Hermann Picha as Hieronymus Abendroth, city councillor
- Otto Wallburg
- Hans Wallner as Revue director
- Ballet Mary Wiggmann
