= Six Girls and a Room for the Night =

1928 film

- Soviet poster
- Directed by: Hans Behrendt
- Written by: Fritz Löhner-Beda; Franz Schulz; Hans Tintner
- Produced by: Hermann Fellner; Josef Somlo
- Starring: Georg Alexander; Ilse Baumann; Jenny Jugo
- Cinematography: Otto Kanturek
- Music by: Willy Schmidt-Gentner
- Production company: Felsom Film
- Distributed by: Deutsche Fox
- Release date: 16 March 1928
- Running time: 106 minutes
- Country: Germany
- Languages: Silent; German intertitles

Six Girls and a Room for the Night (German: Sechs Mädchen suchen Nachtquartier) is a 1928 German silent film directed by Hans Behrendt and starring Georg Alexander, Ilse Baumann and Jenny Jugo. It was shot at the Tempelhof Studios in Berlin. The film's sets were designed by the art director Oscar Friedrich Werndorff.

== Cast ==
In alphabetical order

- Georg Alexander
- Ilse Baumann
- Julius E. Herrmann
- Hilde Hildebrand
- Paul Hörbiger
- Jenny Jugo
- Carla Meissner
- Ilse Mindt
- Ellen Müller
- Edgar Pauly
- Ellen Plessow
- Adele Sandrock
- Truus Van Aalten
- Ernö Verebes
- Else Wasa
- Aribert Wäscher
