= The Eccentric =

1929 film

- Directed by: Walter Jerven
- Written by: Walter Jerven
- Produced by: Walter Jerven; Franz Osten
- Starring: Karl Valentin; Liesl Karlstadt; Truus Van Aalten
- Cinematography: Hans Karl Gottschalk
- Production company: Union-Film
- Release date: 28 December 1929
- Running time: 88 minutes
- Country: Germany
- Languages: Silent; German intertitles

The Eccentric (1929)

The Eccentric or The Odd One (German: Der Sonderling) is a 1929 German silent comedy film directed by Walter Jerven and starring Karl Valentin, Liesl Karlstadt, and Truus van Aalten. It was made at the Emelka Studios in Munich.

== Cast ==
- Karl Valentin as Karl Valentin, Schneidergeselle
- Liesl Karlstadt as Frau Paula Kuhn
- Truus van Aalten as Anni
- Ferdinand Martini as Friedrich Kuhn, Schneidermeister
- Heinz Könecke as Herr Lechner
- Otto Welte
- Karl Raab
- Ulrich Verden
- Georg Rückert
- Maria Byk
- Gustl Gstettenbaur as Uhrmacherlehrling Toni

== Bibliography ==
- Bock, Hans-Michael; Bergfelder, Tim, eds. (2009). The Concise Cinegraph: Encyclopaedia of German Cinema. New York: Berghahn Books. ISBN 978-1-57181-655-9.
