= Het Meisje met de Blauwe Hoed =

1934 film directed by Rudolf Meinert

Het Meisje met den Blauwen Hoed
- Directed by: Rudolf Meinert
- Written by: Alex de Haas; Will Tuschinski
- Release date: 20 December 1934
- Running time: 109 minutes
- Country: Netherlands
- Language: Dutch

Het Meisje met de Blauwe Hoed is a 1934 Dutch comedy film directed by Rudolf Meinert.

== Cast ==
- Truus Van Aalten as Betsy
- Lou Bandy as Toontje
- Roland Varno as Daantje
- Adrienne Solser as Juffrouw Pieters (as Adriënne Solser)
- Hein Harms as Pieters
- Willem van der Veer as Kapitein
- Willy Haak as Zijn vrouw
- Matthieu van Eysden as De Fourier
- Dries Krijn as De Schrijver
- Johnny Roeg as De Sergeant
- Emilie van Stuve as De Luitenant (as Emile van Stuwe)
- Gusta Chrispijn-Mulder as Juffrouw Jansma
- Tony van den Berg as Truus (as Toni van den Berg)
- M. Braakensiek as Betsie's moeder

== Gallery ==
Promotional photos for this film

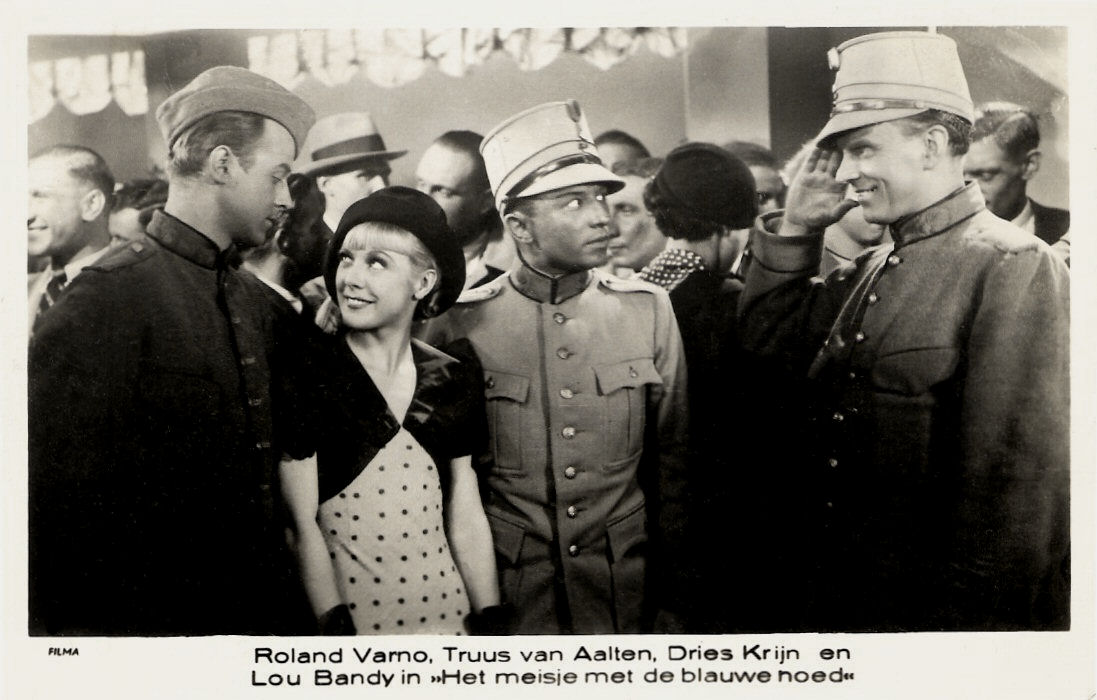

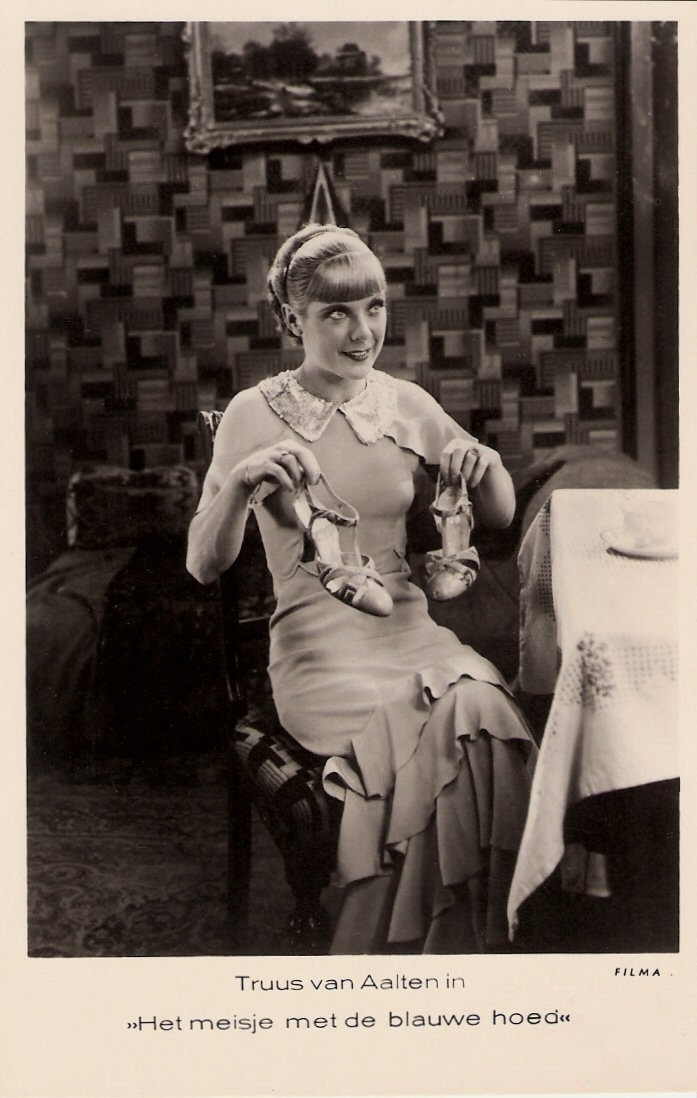

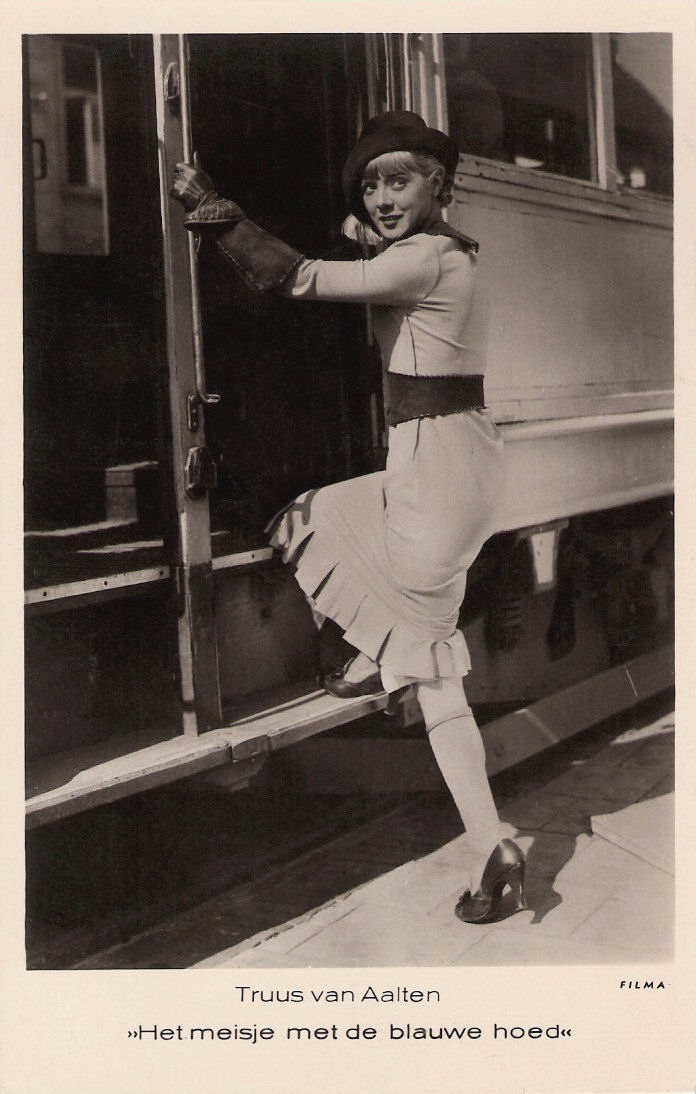

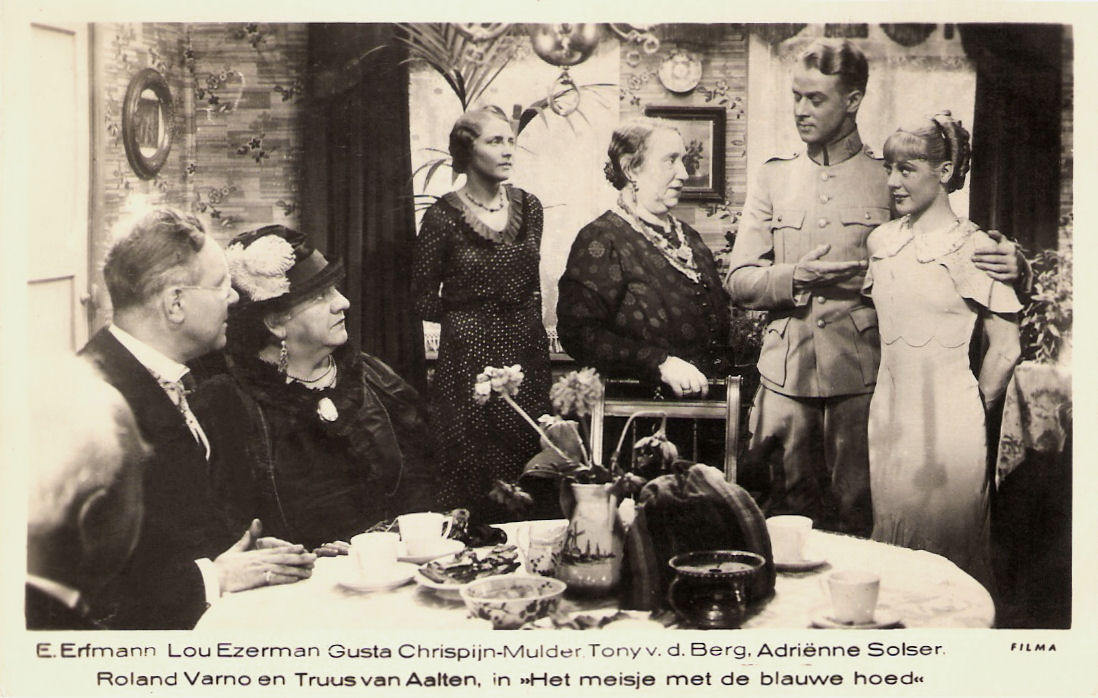

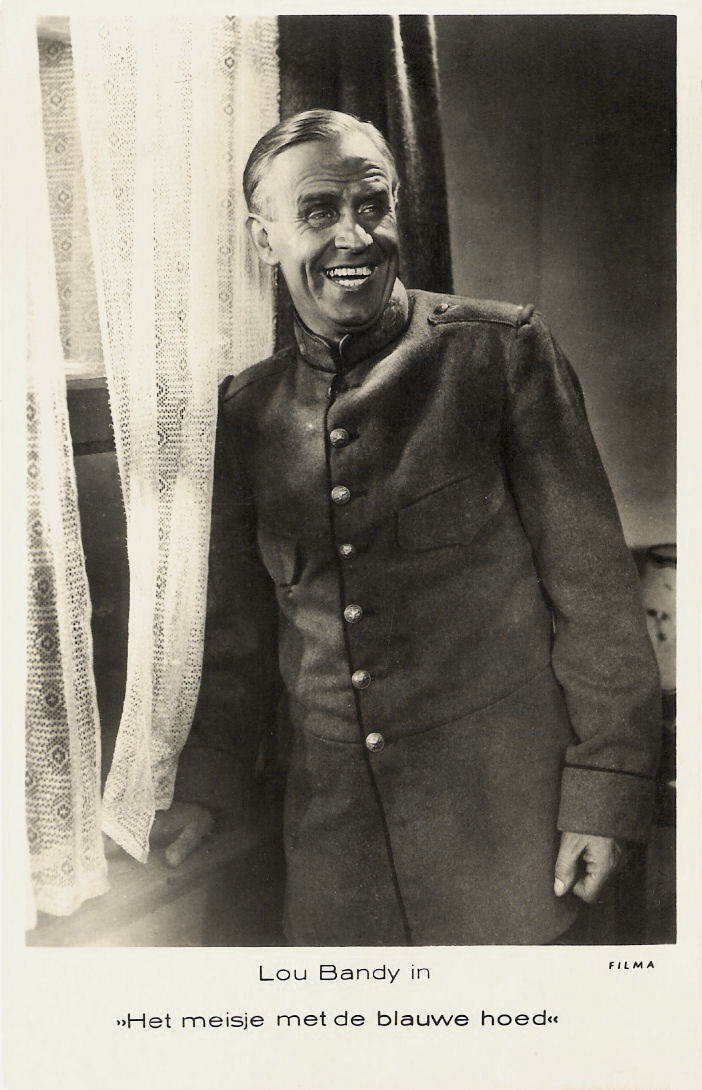

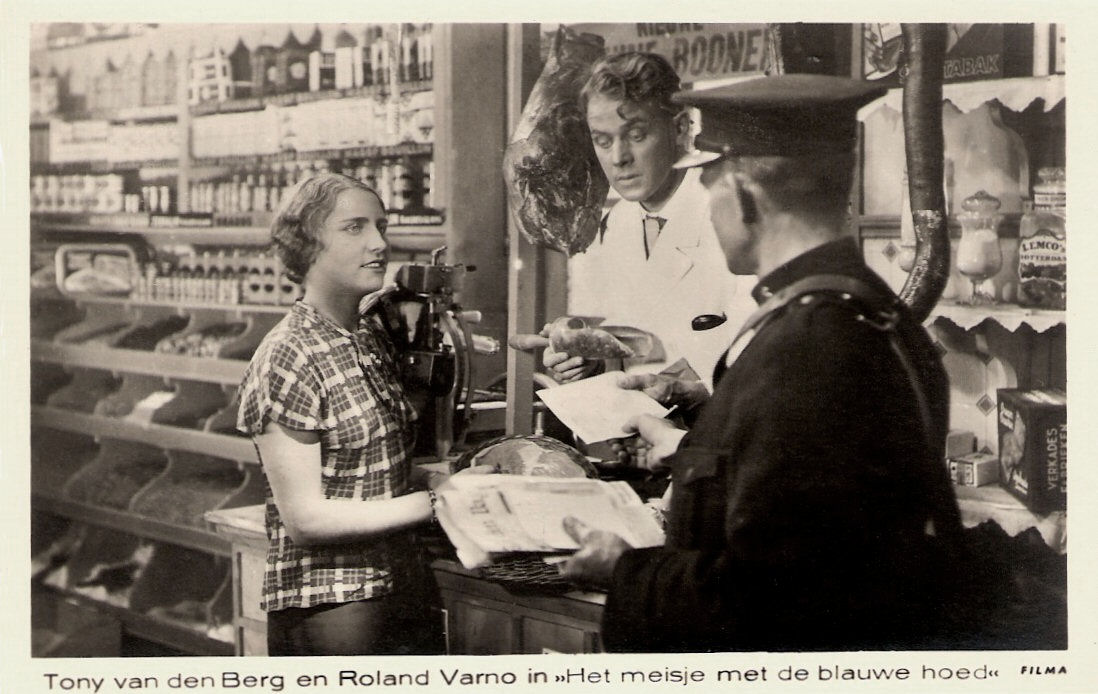

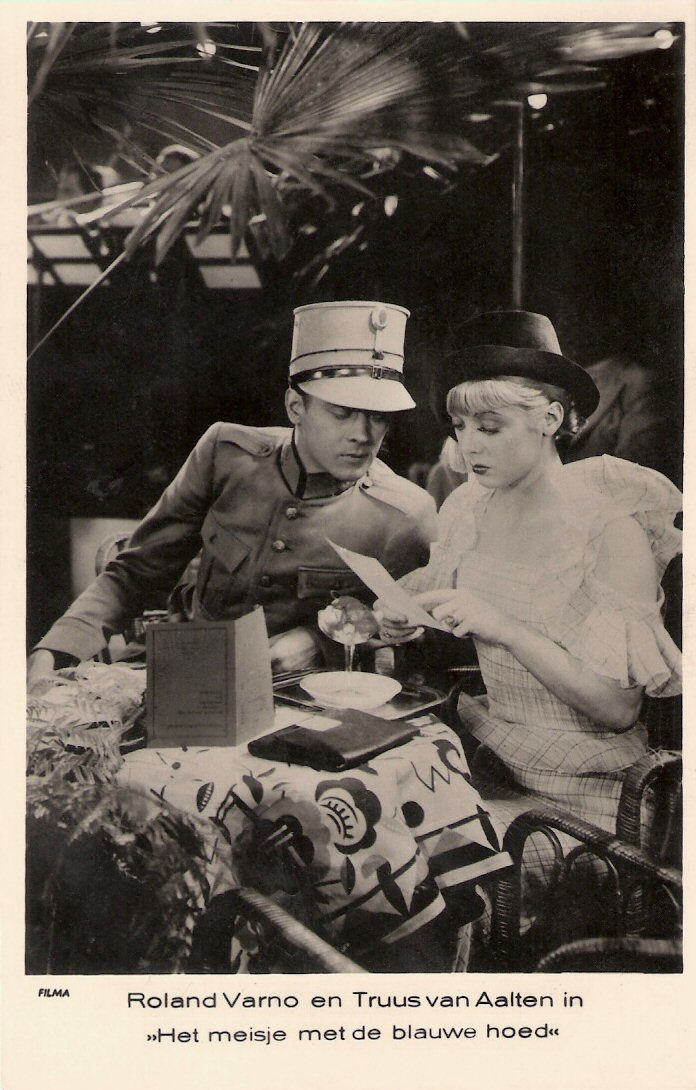

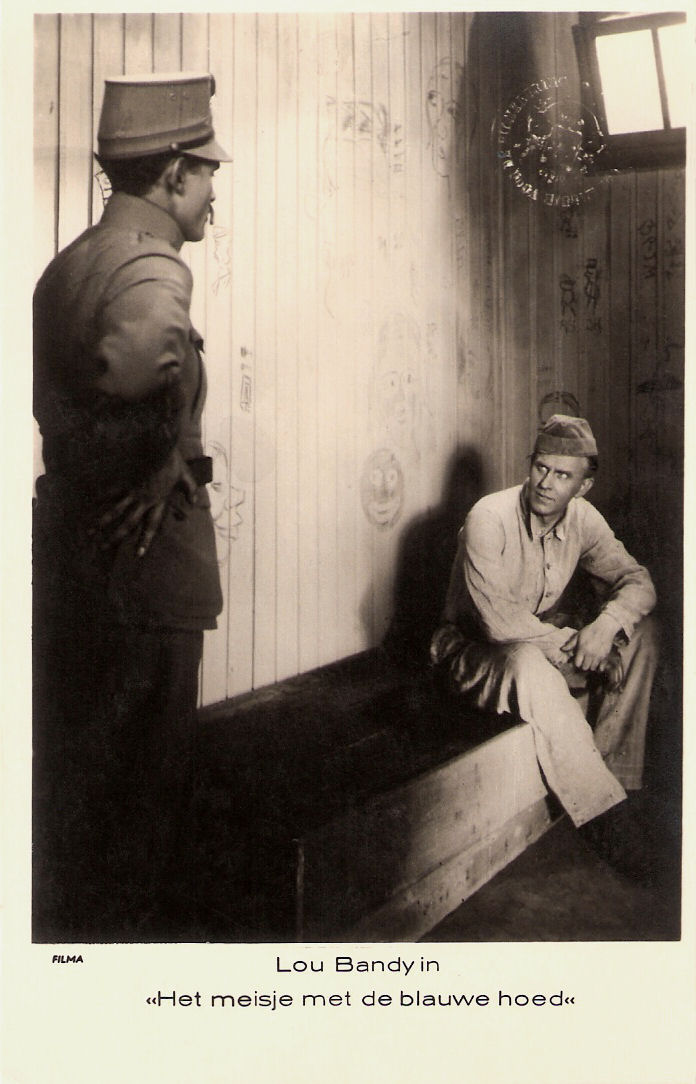

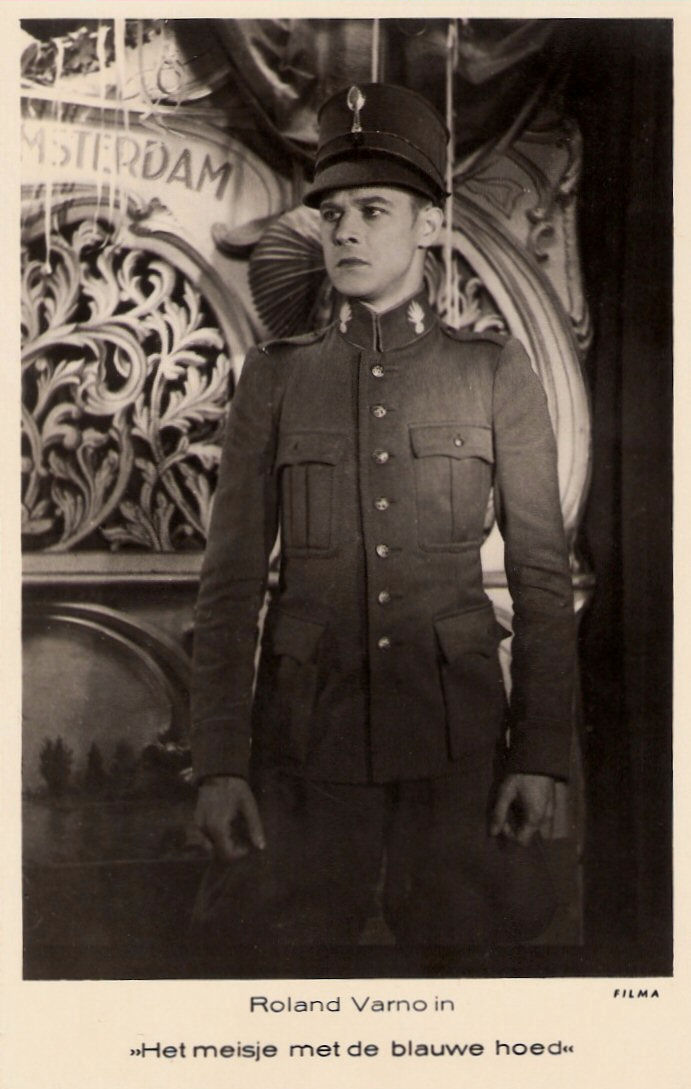

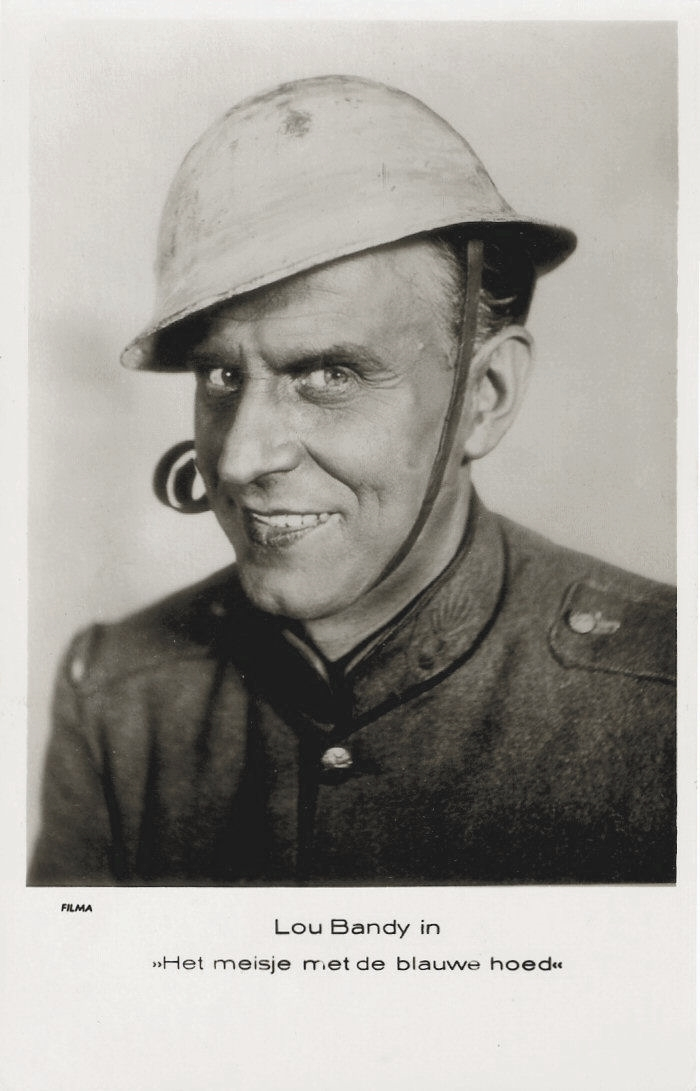
