= Fruit in the Neighbour's Garden =

Fruit in the Neighbour's Garden (German:Kirschen in Nachbars Garten) may refer to:

- Fruit in the Neighbour's Garden (1935 film), a German film
- Fruit in the Neighbour's Garden (1956 film), a West German remake film
