= Once I Loved a Girl in Vienna =

1931 film

- German: In Wien hab' ich einmal ein Mädel geliebt
- Directed by: Erich Schönfelder
- Written by: Ernst Neubach; Hans Pflanzer; Richard Rillo
- Starring: Werner Fuetterer; Gretl Theimer; Ernö Verebes
- Cinematography: Edgar S. Ziesemer
- Production company: Hegewald Film
- Distributed by: Hegewald Film
- Release date: 9 April 1931
- Running time: 84 minutes
- Country: Germany
- Language: German

Once I Loved a Girl in Vienna (German: In Wien hab' ich einmal ein Mädel geliebt) is a 1931 German comedy film directed by Erich Schönfelder and starring Werner Fuetterer, Gretl Theimer and Ernö Verebes.

== Cast ==
- Werner Fuetterer as Franz von Wergenthin
- Gretl Theimer as Annerl
- Ernö Verebes as Imre von Kövesháza
- Hans Junkermann as treasurer von Wergenthin
- Trude Hesterberg as Marchesa Giuseppina Savigliani
- Ludwig Stössel as Valentin Rainer
- Hermann Blaß as jeweller
- Eugen Rex as Wenzel
- Max Ehrlich as film director
- Rudolf Lettinger
- Fritz Spira
- Erwin van Roy
- Carl Geppert
- Senta Liberty
