= Violanta (1942 film) =

1942 film

- Directed by: Paul May
- Written by: Ernst Zahn (novel); Paul May; E. von Richter
- Produced by: Peter Ostermayr
- Starring: Annelies Reinhold; Richard Häussler; Hans Schlenck
- Cinematography: Ekkehard Kyrath
- Edited by: Hans Domnick
- Music by: Winfried Zillig
- Production company: UFA
- Distributed by: UFA
- Release date: 8 May 1942
- Country: Germany
- Language: German

Violanta is a 1942 German drama film directed by Paul May and starring Annelies Reinhold, Richard Häussler, and Hans Schlenck. It is based on a novel by Ernst Zahn which had previously been turned into a silent film in 1928.

Location filming took place around Kufstein in Tyrol.

== Cast ==
- Annelies Reinhold as Violanta
- Richard Häussler as Marianus Renner
- Hans Schlenck as Andreas Renner
- Lili Schoenborn-Anspach as Mutter Renner
- Hedwig Wangel as Frau Zureiss
- Karl Skraup as Vater Zureiss
- Betty Sedlmayr as Sophie Zureiss
- Hans Kratzer as Christoph
- Gisa Wurm as Mühlbacherin
- Ludwig Schmid-Wildy as Kreuzwirt
- Emil Matousek as Franz
- Lizzi von Calmar as Hertha

== Bibliography ==
- Goble, Alan (1999). The Complete Index to Literary Sources in Film. Berlin: Walter de Gruyter. ISBN 978-3-11-095194-3.
