= Tales from the Vienna Woods (1934 film) =

1934 Austrian musical film

- Film poster
- German: G'schichten aus dem Wienerwald
- Directed by: Georg Jacoby
- Written by: Mary Stephans
- Starring: Magda Schneider; Wolf Albach-Retty; Leo Slezak
- Cinematography: Werner Brandes
- Music by: Willy Schmidt-Gentner
- Production companies: Bosser-Films; Mondial-Film
- Distributed by: Lux-Film Wien; Siegel-Monopolfilm (Germany)
- Release date: 27 September 1934
- Running time: 88 minutes
- Country: Austria
- Language: German

Tales from the Vienna Woods (German: G'schichten aus dem Wienerwald) is a 1934 Austrian musical film directed by Georg Jacoby and starring Magda Schneider, Wolf Albach-Retty and Leo Slezak. The title refers to the waltz Tales from the Vienna Woods by Johann Strauss.

== Cast ==
- Magda Schneider as Milly Scheffers
- Wolf Albach-Retty as Graf Rudi von Waldheim
- Leo Slezak as Alois Jeremias Schopf
- Georg Alexander as Prince Kiriloff
- Truus Van Aalten as Mary Limford
- Oscar Sabo as Pomeisl
- Henry Lorenzen as Bobby Limford
- Lotte Lang
- Herbert Hübner
- Karl Kneidinger
- Eduard Loibner
- Karl Zeska
- Karl Bachmann

== Reception ==
Writing for Night and Day in 1937, Graham Greene gave the film a poor review, complaining primarily about the acting of Magda Schneider. Greene claimed that Slezak's "magnificent buffoonery tries to save the film," but concluded that "Austrian films are born dead: horrible bright fakes from a ruined country, libellous laughter".
