= The Roedern Affair =

1944 film

- Directed by: Erich Waschneck
- Written by: Toni Huppertz; Gerda Ital
- Produced by: Christoph Mülleneisen; Franz Tappers
- Starring: Paul Hartmann; Annelies Reinhold; Rudolf Fernau
- Cinematography: Walter Pindter
- Edited by: Marthe Rau
- Music by: Norbert Schultze
- Production company: Berlin Film
- Distributed by: Deutsche Filmvertriebs
- Release date: 14 July 1944
- Running time: 89 minutes
- Country: Germany
- Language: German
- Budget: 1,873,000 RM
- Box office: 2,608,000 RM

The Roedern Affair (German: Die Affäre Rödern) is a 1944 German historical drama film directed by Erich Waschneck and starring Paul Hartmann, Annelies Reinhold and Rudolf Fernau. It is part of the tradition of Prussian films.

The film's sets were designed by the art director Heinrich Beisenherz and Alfred Bütow. It was shot at the Althoff Studios in Berlin and on location in Potsdam.

== Cast ==
- Paul Hartmann as Festungsbaumeister Dietrich von Roedern
- Annelies Reinhold as Sängerin Maria Raven
- Clementia Egies as Elisabeth von Roedern
- Rudolf Fernau as Graf Wengen
- Karl Dannemann as Soldat Knuse
- Franz Schafheitlin as Marquis d'Orion
- Herbert Hübner as General von Krusemarck
- Hans Leibelt as Hofmarschall
- Inge Drexel as Zofe Jeanette
- Hugo Werner-Kahle as Herzog von Braunschweig
- Ursula Herking as Marias Dienerin Luise
- Karl Günther as Major von Moder
- Werner Schott as Oberst von Sack
- Otz Tollen as Herr von Sponseck
- Elfie Dugall as Liese
- Otto Hüsch as Theseus

== Bibliography ==
- Bruce Murray & Christopher J. Wickham. Framing the Past: The Historiography of German Cinema and Television. SIU Press, 1992.
