= Georg Alexander =

German actor (1888–1945)

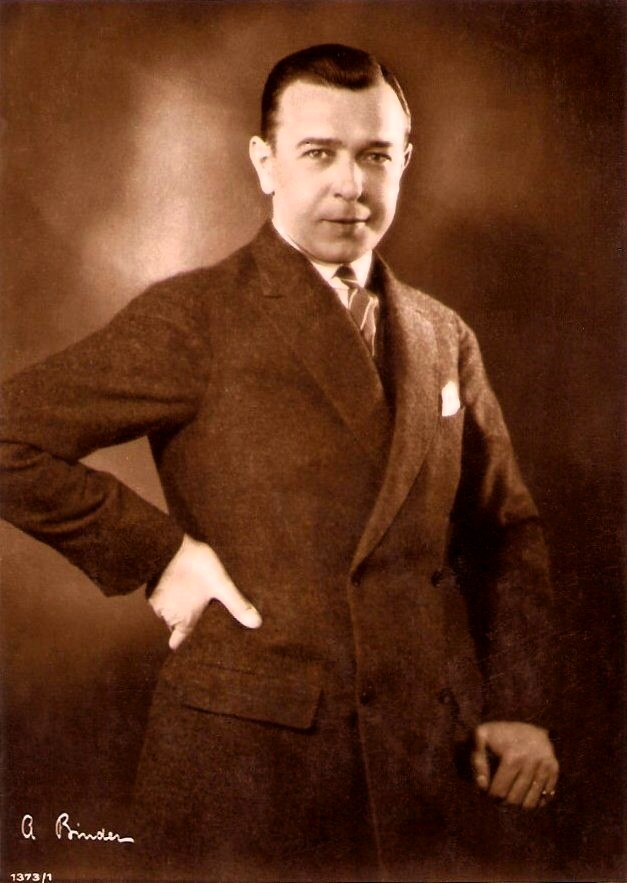
- Georg Alexander in 1928
- Born: Werner Ludwig Georg Lüddeckens; 3 April 1888; Hannover, German Empire
- Died: 30 October 1945 (aged 57); Berlin, Allied-occupied Germany
- Occupations: Actor, Director
- Years active: 1921–1944
- Spouse: Aud Egede-Nissen (m. 1915; div. 1924)
- Children: Georg Richter

Georg Alexander (born Werner Ludwig Georg Lüddeckens; 3 April 1888 – 30 October 1945) was a German film actor who was a prolific presence in German cinema. He also directed a number of films during the silent era.

== Personal life ==
He was married to the Norwegian actress Aud Egede-Nissen from 1915 to 1924. Their son Georg Richter also became an actor.

== Filmography ==
- Es war einst ein Prinzesschen (1916)
- Der Verräter (1917)
- Das Verhängnis der schönen Susi (1917)
- The Platonic Marriage (1919)
- Die lachende Seele (1919)
- Erblich belastet (1919)
- A Drive into the Blue (1919)
- Zwischen Lachen und Weinen (1919)
- Luxuspflänzchen (1919)
- False Start (1919)
- Indian Revenge (1920)
- Nixchen (1920)
- In the Whirl of Life (1920)
- Lady Hamilton (1921)
- Peter Voss, Thief of Millions (1921, 6 parts)
- His Excellency from Madagascar (1922, 2 parts)
- The Game with Women (1922)
- Miss Rockefeller Is Filming (1922)
- The Girl of the Golden West (1922)
- Lola Montez, the King's Dancer (1922)
- Paradise in the Snow (1923)
- The Woman Worth Millions (1923)
- King of Women (1923)
- Das Milliardensouper (1923)
- The Most Beautiful Woman in the World (1924)
- The Wonderful Adventure (1924)
- Comedians of Life (1924)
- My Leopold (1924)
- The Great Unknown (1924)
- The Gentleman Without a Residence (1925)
- The Adventure of Mr. Philip Collins (1925)
- Jealousy (1925)
- Hussar Fever (1925)
- Accommodations for Marriage (1926)
- Nanette Makes Everything (1926)
- Love is Blind (1926)
- The World Wants To Be Deceived (1926)
- The Mill at Sanssouci (1926)
- The Little Variety Star (1926)
- The Hunt for the Bride (1927)
- The Orlov (1927)
- The Lady with the Tiger Skin (1927)
- Nameless Woman (1927)
- Intoxicated Love (1927)
- The Indiscreet Woman (1927)
- One Plus One Equals Three (1927)
- Venus in Evening Wear (1927)
- The Island of Forbidden Kisses (1927)
- The Dollar Princess and her Six Admirers (1927)
- Leontine's Husbands (1928)
- Six Girls and a Room for the Night (1928)
- Immorality (1928)
- Princess Olala (1928)
- Batalla de damas (1928)
- Flucht vor Blond (1928)
- He Goes Right, She Goes Left! (1928)
- Dyckerpotts' Heirs (1928)
- Mikosch Comes In (1928)
- The Great Adventuress (1928)
- Dyckerpotts' Heirs (1928)
- The Happy Vagabonds (1929)
- Love in the Snow (1929)
- Autobus Number Two (1929)
- His Majesty's Lieutenant (1929)
- What's Wrong with Nanette? (1929)
- Black Forest Girl (1929)
- The Diva (1929)
- The Love Waltz (1930)
- Tenderness (1930)
- The Singing City (1930)
- Money on the Street (1930)
- Marriage Strike (1930)
- Waltz of Love (1930)
- The Right to Love (1930)
- Lieutenant, Were You Once a Hussar? (1930)
- Die Bräutigamswitwe (1931)
- Wiener Liebschaften (1931)
- Let's Love and Laugh (1931)
- Die Fledermaus (1931)
- Marriage with Limited Liability (1931)
- The Opera Ball (1931)
- The Love Express (1931)
- Trara um Liebe (1931)
- Hooray, It's a Boy! (1931)
- Der verjüngte Adolar (1931)
- The Testament of Cornelius Gulden (1932)
- When Love Sets the Fashion (1932)
- Modern Dowry (1932)
- Durchlaucht amüsiert sich (1932)
- The Escape to Nice (1932)
- A Bit of Love (1932)
- The Importance of Being Earnest (1932)
- How Shall I Tell My Husband? (1932)
- Mamsell Nitouche (1932)
- The Tsarevich (1933)
- Madame Wants No Children (1933)
- And Who Is Kissing Me? (1933)
- Love Must Be Understood (1933)
- Our Emperor (1933)
- A Woman Like You (1933)
- Ist mein Mann nicht fabelhaft? (1933)
- The English Marriage (1934)
- The Flower Girl from the Grand Hotel (1934)
- Gypsy Blood (1934)
- The Double (1934)
- Tales from the Vienna Woods (1934)
- The Bird Seller (1935)
- Alles hört auf mein Kommando (1935)
- The Old and the Young King (1935)
- Ein falscher Fuffziger (1935)
- Der Schlafwagenkontrolleur (1935)
- Ein Mädel aus guter Familie (1935)
- Leutnant Bobby, der Teufelskerl (1935)
- Dance Music (1935)
- An Ideal Husband (1935)
- Escapade (1936)
- Rendezvous in Vienna (1936)
- Martha (1936)
- Donaumelodien (1936)
- Girls in White (1936)
- Das Frauenparadies (1936)
- The Castle in Flanders (1936)
- Adventure in Warsaw (1937)
- Eine Nacht mit Hindernissen (1937)
- Krach und Glück um Künnemann (1937)
- Die Fledermaus (1937)
- Carousel (1937)
- Zweimal zwei im Himmelbett (1937)
- Hahn im Korb (1937)
- Kleiner Mann – ganz groß! (1938)
- Gastspiel im Paradies (1938)
- Geld fällt vom Himmel (1938)
- Unsere kleine Frau (1938)
- The Deruga Case (1938)
- The Woman at the Crossroads (1938)
- The Girl of Last Night (1938)
- Heimat (1938)
- Mia moglie si diverte (1938)
- Adventure in Love (1938)
- Linen from Ireland (1939)
- The Wise Mother in Law (1939)
- Der arme Millionär (1939)
- Woman at the Wheel (1939)
- Wenn Männer verreisen (1940)
- Small Town Poet (1940)
- Das himmelblaue Abendkleid (1941)
- Oh, diese Männer (1941)
- Mistress Moon (1941)
- Women Are Better Diplomats (1941)
- What Does Brigitte Want? (1941)
- Ein Zug fährt ab (1942)
- Abenteuer im Grandhotel (1943)
- ...und die Musik spielt dazu (1943)
- Die beiden Schwestern (1943)
- The Woman of My Dreams (1944)
- The Master Detective (1944)

== Bibliography ==
- Hardt, Usula.i to California: Erich Pommer's Life in the In
