= Heinrich Beisenherz =

German painter

- Born: 5 February 1891; Dortmund, German Empire
- Died: 24 March 1977 (aged 86); Wiesbaden, West Germany
- Occupations: Art director, painter
- Years active: 1922-1955 (film)

Heinrich Beisenherz (1891 – 1977) was a German art director and painter.

== Life ==
Heinrich Beisenherz was the son of a carpenter who after training as an artist, worked in the field of arts and crafts and decorative painting, interrupted only by military service from 1913 to 1917.

In 1920, Beisenherz switched to the film industry. In the early 1920s, he designed some films for the first time, but continued to work as an artist. He was then invited to the Soviet Union by the Ukrainian Photo and Cinema Administration (ВУФКУ) and worked from 1926 to 1928 in the Odessa Film Studios under the Russified name Georgiy Bayzengerts (Ru: Георгий Байзенгерц). At the beginning of the 1930s, he returned to German cinema. There he created the sets for comedies by and with Heinz Rühmann, but also for Nazi propaganda films such as Wunschkonzert and Spähtrupp Hallgarten. Between 1939 and 1945, and in 1952, he worked regularly with his colleague Alfred Bütow.

Beisenherz's post-war works were almost insignificant.

== Selected filmography ==
- Downfall (1923)
- The Secret of Brinkenhof (1923)
- The Love of a Queen (1923)
- Garragan (1924)
- Anna and Elizabeth (1933)
- Secret Mission (1938)
- Police Report (1939)
- Hurrah! I'm a Father (1939)
- Mistress Moon (1941)
- Mask in Blue (1943)
- Carnival of Love (1943)
- The Roedern Affair (1944)
- Free Land (1946)
- Thank You, I'm Fine (1948)
- King for One Night (1950)
- Fritz and Friederike (1952)
- The Silent Angel (1954)
- The Dark Star (1955)

== Bibliography ==
- Giesen, Rolf. Nazi Propaganda Films: A History and Filmography. McFarland & Company, 2003.
