= Otto Ernst Lubitz =

- Born: 23 June 1896; Berlin, German Empire
- Died: 30 April 1943 (aged 46); Berlin, Germany
- Occupations: Producer, Writer
- Years active: 1933-1943 (film)

Otto Ernst Lubitz (1896 – 1943) was a German screenwriter, film producer and production manager. During the 1930s he worked for the Munich-based Bavaria Film. He later became part of the Berlin Film group of independent producers.

== Selected filmography ==
- A Woman Like You (1933)
- The Fugitive from Chicago (1934)
- The Legacy of Pretoria (1934)
- The Fight with the Dragon (1935)
- The King's Prisoner (1935)
- The Three Around Christine (1936)
- The Glass Ball (1937)
- The Model Husband (1937)
- Marionette (1939)
- Voice of the Heart (1942)
- Wild Bird (1943)

== Bibliography ==
- Ulrich J. Klaus. Deutsche Tonfilme: Filmlexikon der abendfüllenden deutschen und deutschsprachigen Tonfilme nach ihren deutschen Uraufführungen, Volume 9. Klaus-Archiv, 2006.
