= King for One Night =

1950 film

- Directed by: Paul May
- Written by: Werner Eplinius
- Produced by: Max G. Hüske; Paul May
- Starring: Anton Walbrook; Willy Fritsch; Annelies Reinhold
- Cinematography: Josef Illig; Franz Koch
- Edited by: Anneliese Schönnenbeck
- Music by: Winfried Zillig
- Production company: Orbis Filmproduktion
- Distributed by: Union-Film
- Release date: 22 December 1950
- Running time: 100 minutes
- Country: West Germany
- Language: German

King for One Night (German: König für eine Nacht) is a 1950 West German historical comedy film directed by Paul May and starring Anton Walbrook, Willy Fritsch and Annelies Reinhold. It was made at the Bavaria Studios in Munich. The film's sets were designed by the art directors Heinrich Beisenherz and Bruno Monden.

== Cast ==
- Anton Walbrook as Graf von Lerchenbach
- Willy Fritsch as König Ludwig I von Bayern
- Annelies Reinhold as Gräfin Franziska Rosenau
- Margarete Slezak as Karoline
- Elisabeth Flickenschildt as Wilma
- Gustav Waldau
- Karl Schopp
- Georg Vogelsang
- Dieter Suchsland
- Michl Lang
- Erich Fischer

== Bibliography ==
- Bock, Hans-Michael & Bergfelder, Tim. The Concise Cinegraph: Encyclopaedia of German Cinema. Berghahn Books, 2009.
