= Jenny's Stroll Through Men =

1929 film

- Directed by: Jaap Speyer
- Written by: Hans Backwitz
- Produced by: Julius Sternheim
- Starring: Ferry Sikla; Olga Limburg; Harry Halm
- Cinematography: Bruno Mondi
- Music by: Giuseppe Becce
- Production company: Terra Film
- Distributed by: Terra Film
- Release date: 26 September 1929
- Country: Germany
- Languages: Silent; German intertitles

Jenny's Stroll Through Men (German: Jennys Bummel durch die Männer) is a 1929 German silent film directed by Jaap Speyer and starring Ferry Sikla, Olga Limburg, and Harry Halm.

The film's art direction was by Bernhard Klein and Bruno Lutz.

== Cast ==
- Ferry Sikla as Dusterberg sen.
- Olga Limburg as Frau Dusterberg
- Harry Halm as Dr. Frank Dusterberg, der Neffe
- Inge Borg as Jenny, Mannequin
- Truus Van Aalten as Anny, Lehrmädchen
- Hubert von Meyerinck as Lorenz, Modezeichner
- Eugen Burg as Mr. Pierpont Bruce
- Toni Tetzlaff as Mrs. Bruce
- John Mylong as Mr. Dinessen
- Else Reval

== Bibliography ==
- Ganeva, Mila (2008). Women in Weimar Fashion: Discourses and Displays in German Culture, 1918–1933. Rochester, NY: Camden House. ISBN 978-1-57113-205-5.
