= Lydia Potechina =

Russian actress (1883–1934)

- Born: 5 September 1883; St. Petersburg, Russian Empire
- Died: 30 April 1934 (aged 50); Berlin, Germany
- Occupation: Actress
- Years active: 1921–1932

Lydia Potechina (5 September 1883 – 30 April 1934) was a Russian actress. She emigrated to Germany in 1918. She was married to the Russian-German film producer Max Pfeiffer.

== Selected filmography ==
- Destiny (1921)
- The Conspiracy in Genoa (1921)
- Parisian Women (1921)
- Circus of Life (1921)
- Wandering Souls (1921)
- Barmaid (1922)
- Dr. Mabuse the Gambler (1922)
- Insulted and Humiliated (1922)
- The Green Manuela (1923)
- Fräulein Raffke (1923)
- Resurrection (1923)
- Carousel (1923)
- Comedy of the Heart (1924)
- Darling of the King (1924)
- Leap Into Life (1924)
- The Great Unknown (1924)
- Passion (1925)
- The Found Bride (1925)
- Women of Luxury (1925)
- Oh Those Glorious Old Student Days (1925)
- A Waltz Dream (1925)
- The Telephone Operator (1925)
- Athletes (1925)
- Peter the Pirate (1925)
- The Pride of the Company (1926)
- The Schimeck Family (1926)
- People to Each Other (1926)
- She Is the Only One (1926)
- Darling, Count the Cash (1926)
- The Three Mannequins (1926)
- The Wooing of Eve (1926)
- Countess Ironing-Maid (1926)
- The Third Squadron (1926)
- A Sister of Six (1926)
- We Belong to the Imperial-Royal Infantry Regiment (1926)
- Chaste Susanne (1926)
- The Pink Diamond (1926)
- The Three Mannequins (1926)
- Eva and the Grasshopper (1927)
- The Girl from Abroad (1927)
- A Serious Case (1927)
- The Bordellos of Algiers (1927)
- Always Be True and Faithful (1927)
- The Prince of Pappenheim (1927)
- German Women - German Faithfulness (1927)
- The Awakening of Woman (1927)
- The Transformation of Dr. Bessel (1927)
- His Late Excellency (1927)
- Homesick (1927)
- Looping the Loop (1928)
- Mikosch Comes In (1928)
- The Criminal of the Century (1928)
- Don Juan in a Girls' School (1928)
- A Better Master (1928)
- The Last Performance of the Circus Wolfson (1928)
- A Modern Casanova (1928)
- Do You Know That Little House on Lake Michigan? (1929)
- Love on Skis (1928)
- On the Reeperbahn at Half Past Midnight (1929)
- Gentlemen Among Themselves (1929)
- My Heart is a Jazz Band (1929)
- I Lost My Heart on a Bus (1929)
- The Circus Princess (1929)
- The Widow's Ball (1930)
- The White Devil (1930)
- The Tsar's Diamond (1932)
- I by Day, You by Night (1932)

== Bibliography ==
- Hardt, Ursula. From Caligari to California: Erich Pommer's Life in the International Film Wars. Berghahn Books, 1996.
