= Duel with Death =

- Belgian release poster
- Directed by: Paul May
- Written by: Paul May; Georg Wilhelm Pabst
- Produced by: Georg Wilhelm Pabst
- Starring: Rolf von Nauckhoff; Annelies Reinhold; Fritz Hinz-Fabricius
- Cinematography: Helmut Ashley
- Music by: Alfred Schneider
- Production company: Pabst-Kiba-Filmproduktionsgesellschaft
- Distributed by: Union Film
- Release date: 20 July 1949
- Running time: 114 minutes
- Country: Austria
- Language: German

Duel with Death (German: Duell mit dem Tod) is a 1949 Austrian war drama film directed by Paul May and starring Rolf von Nauckhoff, Annelies Reinhold, and Fritz Hinz-Fabricius. The film depicts the Austrian resistance to Nazi Germany during the Second World War, and takes influence from May's and his friends real-life experiences during the war.

The sets were designed by the art director Otto Pischinger.

It premiered at the Locarno Film Festival in July 1949 before its general release in Austria that December.

== Plot ==
A Professor is brought before an Allied military court to explain apparently incriminating evidence against him. This gives him a chance to recount what really happened during the war years.

== Cast ==
- Rolf von Nauckhoff as Dr. Ernst Romberg
- Annelies Reinhold as Maria Romberg
- Fritz Hinz-Fabricius as Pfarrer Menhardt
- Hans Dreßler as Defense lawyer Dr. Hallmann
- Louis V. Arco as Gerichtsvorsitzender
- Ernst Waldbrunn as Franz Lang
- Maria Eis as Frau Lang
- Erich Auer as Geisler
- Martin King as Ziegler
- Manfred Schuster as Beierle
- Hannes Schiel as Rainer, Standartenführer der SS
- Josef Krastel as Kaindl
- Emmerich Schrenk as Dietz, Sturmführer der SS
- Otto Schmöle as Präsident des deutschen Feldkriegsgerichts
- Ulrich Bettac
- Erich Dörner
- Heinz Moog

== Bibliography ==
- Fritsche, Maria (2013-05-01). Homemade Men in Postwar Austrian Cinema: Nationhood, Genre and Masculinity. Berghahn Books. ISBN 978-0-85745-946-6.
