= Wilhelmine Sandrock =

German actress (1861 - 1948

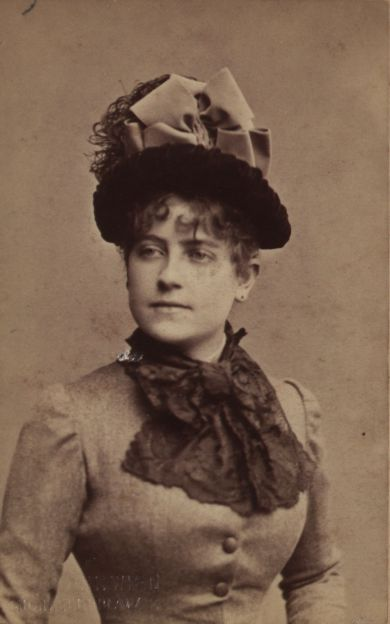
- Born: February 5, 1861; Rotterdam, Netherlands
- Died: November 29, 1948 (aged 87); Berlin, Allied-occupied Germany
- Resting place: Vienna, Austria
- Citizenship: German
- Occupations: Actress, singer
- Years active: 1881–1930
- Relatives: Adele Sandrock

Wilhelmine Sandrock (born 5 February 1861 in Rotterdam; † 29 November 1948 in Berlin-Charlottenburg) was a German actress, active in theatre, silent and early sound films.

Similar to her younger and more famous sister Adele Sandrock, she was known for acting in well-known theatres in the respective imperial capitals Berlin and Vienna in the decades before the turn of the century. Before World War I, Sandrock retired from the stage and settled in Berlin-Charlottenburg. In the German cinema of the 1920s and 1930, she appeared in films directed by Carl Theodor Dreyer and Steve Sekely.

== Life and career ==
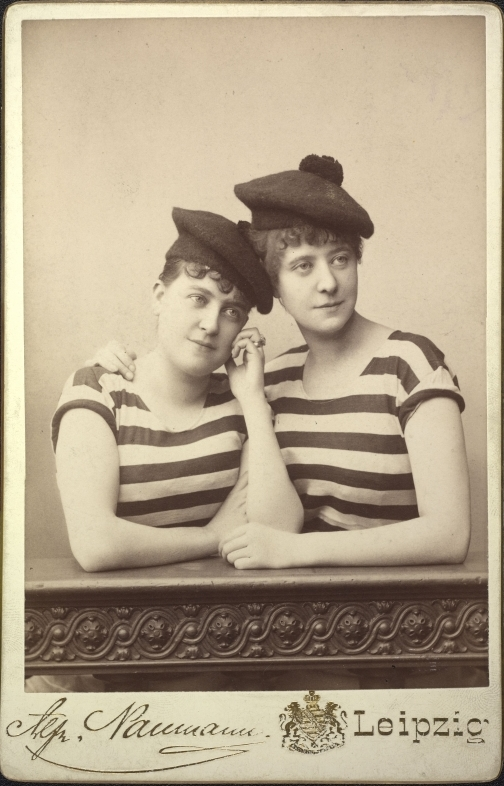
Sisters Adele Sandrock (left) and Wilhelmine Sandrock, 1885

Wilhelmine Sandrock was the eldest child of the German merchant Eduard Sandrock (1834–1897) and the Dutch actress Johanna Simonetta ten Hagen (1833–1917). With her younger siblings Christian Sandrock and Adele Sandrock, she grew up in Rotterdam and later, after her parents' marriage was divorced in 1869, in Berlin, where she continued her schooling and learned the German language.

From an early age, Sandrock took on small acting roles at school festivals. She received singing lessons from German musician Theodor Kullak at the Neue Akademie der Tonkunst; her mother and later the court actor Heinrich Oberländer gave her acting lessons. Supported by their mother, Wilhelmine and Adele got their first roles. Thanks to this, she was soon able to make her successful debut at the Royal Schauspielhaus Berlin. Later, Sandrock was signed to the Wallner Theater. From there she went on to the Court Theatre in Saint Petersburg. After this engagement, she returned to Berlin and was first seen there as the "Puppet Princess" at the Kroll'sches Theater. Sandrock also was successful as a singer, for example in 1898 as vocal soubrette at Berlin's Thalia Theatre.

In 1886 she was appointed by the artistic director Adolf von Wilbrandt at the Hofburgtheater in Vienna, then capital of the Austrian-Hungarian Empire, where Adele followed her a few years later, so that the sisters performed together from 1895 to 1898. Wilhelmine also had a romantic relationship with Austrian writer Hermann Bahr, while her sister Adele had a relationship with Austrian dramatist Arthur Schnitzler. In 1894, Austrian writer Karl Kraus met Adele Sandrock and Hermann Bahr and maintained a friendly relationship with Wilhelmine Sandrock. His correspondence between 1899 and 1904 shows a close familiarity between Kraus and Sandrock. Both sisters never married and shared their apartment in Berlin-Charlottenburg until their respective deaths.

After having been a member of the Hofburgtheater for 14 years, Wilhelmine's contract was not renewed in March 1898. Adele resigned out of solidarity, and the case attracted wide attention: The two sisters even received an audience with the Austrian emperor. Wilhelmine did not receive an extension, but a pension, and Adele remained at the Burgtheater for the time being. Wilhelmine Sandrock first performed at the Kaiser-Jubiläums-Stadttheater (now Volksoper) and then returned to Berlin in autumn of 1898 for the next season at the Residenztheater. She was joined by Adele in 1904, who was engaged by the Deutsches Theater in Berlin to work with director Max Reinhardt.

Before World War I, Sandrock retired from the stage and lived in Berlin-Charlottenburg. Turning to acting in movies, she played the role of Widow de Monthieu in Michael, the 1924 German silent drama film directed by Carl Theodor Dreyer. In Steve Sekely's 1930 German comedy film The Great Longing, she played herself, alongside her sister and a number of other famous film stars of the day.

When her sister died in Berlin in 1937, Wilhelmine completed Adele's autobiography and published it in 1940. Wilhelmine Sandrock died at the age of 87 in November 1948 and found her final resting place in the family grave at the Matzleinsdorf cemetery in Vienna, where Adele and the bones of their parents, exhumed from a family grave, had been buried in 1937.

== Roles ==
Theatre

- Eduard Jacobson, Otto Girndt: Die Puppenprinzessin (role: Puppet Prinzess).
- Enrica von Handel-Mazzetti, Ich kauf' ein Mohrenkind (role: Mission sister). 1904.

Films

- 1924: Michael
- 1930: The Great Longing

== Literature ==
- Adele Sandrock: Mein Leben. Ergänzt und herausgegeben von Wilhelmine Sandrock. Mit einem Vorwort von Joseph Gregor. Buchwarte-Verlag, Berlin 1940. (Projekt Gutenberg, in German)
