= False Start (film) =

- Directed by: Georg Alexander
- Written by: Georg Alexander
- Produced by: Georg Alexander
- Starring: Georg Alexander; Marija Leiko; Kissa von Sievers
- Cinematography: Kurt Lande
- Distributed by: Neue Berliner Film
- Release date: 1919
- Country: Germany
- Languages: Silent; German intertitles

False Start (German: Falscher Start) is a 1919 German silent film directed by Georg Alexander and starring Alexander, Marija Leiko and Kissa von Sievers.

== Cast ==
- Georg Alexander as George Broosten
- Marija Leiko as Inge
- Kissa von Sievers as Varietékünstlerin Daisy

== Bibliography ==
- Bock, Hans-Michael & Bergfelder, Tim. The Concise CineGraph. Encyclopedia of German Cinema. Berghahn Books, 2009.
