= Violantha =

1928 film directed by Carl Froelich

- Henny Porten
- Directed by: Carl Froelich
- Written by: Ernst Zahn (novel); Walter Supper; Hans Wilhelm
- Produced by: Carl Froelich; Henny Porten; Wilhelm von Kaufmann
- Starring: Henny Porten; Mathilde Sussin; William Dieterle
- Cinematography: Robert Freckmann; Axel Graatkjær; Gustave Preiss
- Music by: Walter Winnig
- Production companies: Henny Porten-Froelich-Produktion; Monopol-Film
- Distributed by: Parufamet
- Release date: 8 January 1928
- Countries: Germany; Switzerland
- Languages: Silent; German intertitles

Violantha is a 1928 German-Swiss silent film directed by Carl Froelich and starring Henny Porten, Mathilde Sussin and William Dieterle. The film is set in Switzerland and is based on a novel by Ernst Zahn. In 1942 it was remade by Paul May as a sound film under the slightly different title of Violanta.

The film's art direction was by Franz Schroedter. It was shot at the Halensee Studios in Berlin and on location in Switzerland.

== Cast ==
- Mathilde Sussin as Die alte Frau Renner
- William Dieterle as Adelrich - ihr erster Sohn
- Alexander Sascha as Marianus - ihr zweiter Sohn
- Henny Porten as Violantha Zureich
- Karl Platen as Jeremias Zureich / Kneipenwirt / ihr Onkel
- Elsa Wagner as Seine Frau
- Gerd Fricke as Xaver - sein Sohn
- Wilhelm Diegelmann as Hofer, Gastwirt
- Sophie Pagay as seine Frau
- Blandine Ebinger as Bella - Kellnerin bei Zureich
- Inge Landgut as Fini
- Max Maximilian as Ein Viehhändler

== Bibliography ==
- James Robert Parish & Kingsley Canham. Film Directors Guide: Western Europe. Scarecrow Press, 1976.
