= Headfirst into Happiness =

1931 film

- German film poster
- German: Kopfüber ins Glück
- Directed by: Hans Steinhoff
- Written by: Richard Arvay; Bruno Hardt-Warden; Charlie Roellinghoff
- Produced by: Marcel Hellman
- Starring: Jenny Jugo; Fritz Schulz; S. Z. Sakall
- Cinematography: Victor Arménise; Karl Puth
- Music by: Nico Dostal; Walter Kollo
- Production company: Marcel Hellmann Film
- Distributed by: Vereinigte Star-Film
- Release date: 26 January 1931
- Running time: 86 minutes
- Country: Germany
- Language: German

Headfirst into Happiness (German: Kopfüber ins Glück) is a 1931 German comedy film directed by Hans Steinhoff and starring Jenny Jugo, Fritz Schulz and S. Z. Sakall. A separate French-language version Everybody Wins was also produced. Such multiple-language versions were common during the early years of sound before dubbing became more widespread. It was shot at the Joinville Studios in Paris. The film's sets were designed by the art director Jacques Colombier.

== Cast ==
- Jenny Jugo as Madeleine
- Fritz Schulz as Marcel Durant
- Alexa Engström as Baronin Clairisse Monteuil
- S. Z. Sakall as Baron Monteuil
- Berthe Ostyn as Jvonne Linné
- Kurt Lilien
- Truus Van Aalten as Lily
- Austin Egen
- Gisa Bergmann
- Albert Paulig
- Luigi Bernauer
- Eugen Rex
