= The Great Longing =

1930 film

- Directed by: Steve Sekely
- Written by: Emeric Pressburger; Hans H. Zerlett; Steve Sekely
- Starring: Camilla Horn; Theodor Loos; Harry Frank; Paul Kemp
- Cinematography: Mutz Greenbaum
- Music by: Karl Brüll; Paul Dessau; Rudolf Eisner; Friedrich Hollaender
- Production company: Cicero Film
- Distributed by: Deutsche Universal-Film
- Release date: 25 August 1930
- Running time: 100 minutes
- Country: Germany
- Language: German

The Great Longing (German: Die große Sehnsucht) is a 1930 German comedy film directed by Steve Sekely in his directorial debut and starring Camilla Horn, Theodor Loos, and Harry Frank. It was shot at the EFA Studios in Berlin. The film's sets were designed by the art directors Hans Sohnle and Otto Erdmann. It was distributed by the German branch of Universal Pictures.

== Cast ==
- Camilla Horn as Eva von Loe
- Theodor Loos as Regisseur Hall
- Harry Frank as Paul Wessel
- Paul Kemp as Regieassistent Mopp
- Paul Henckels as Aufnahmeleiter Klieht
- Berthe Ostyn as Carla Marventa
- Irma Godau as Mary
- Anna Müller-Lincke as Garderobiere
- Erwin van Roy as Regisseur Berg
- Karl Platen as Fridericus Rex
- Ferdinand Bonn as Cornelius
- Walter Steinbeck as Filmdirector
- Betty Amann as herself
- Elga Brink as herself
- Lil Dagover as herself
- Liane Haid as herself
- Jenny Jugo as herself
- Anny Ondra as herself
- Maria Paudler as herself
- Adele Sandrock as herself
- Wilhelmine Sandrock as herself
- Charlotte Susa as herself
- Olga Chekhova as herself
- Camilla von Hollay as herself
- Gustav Diessl as himself
- Paul Heidemann as himself
- Walter Janssen as himself
- Fritz Kortner as himself
- Francis Lederer as himself
- Harry Liedtke as himself
- Theo Lingen as himself
- Charles Puffy as himself
- Fritz Rasp as himself
- Walter Rilla as himself
- Hans Adalbert Schlettow as himself
- Luis Trenker as himself
- Jack Trevor as himself
- Conrad Veidt as himself
- Ernő Verebes as himself

== Bibliography ==
- Hagener, Malte (2007). Moving Forward, Looking Back: The European Avant-Garde and the Invention of Film Culture, 1919–1939. Amsterdam: Amsterdam University Press. ISBN 978-90-5356-961-0.
