= Circus of Life =

1921 film directed by Johannes Guter

- Directed by: Johannes Guter
- Written by: Hans Janowitz; Franz Schulz
- Produced by: Erich Pommer
- Starring: Werner Krauss; Lydia Potechina; Rudolf Klein-Rogge
- Cinematography: Axel Graatkjær
- Production company: Decla-Bioscop
- Distributed by: UFA
- Release date: 15 December 1921
- Country: Germany
- Languages: Silent; German intertitles

Circus of Life (German: Zirkus des Lebens) is a 1921 German silent drama film directed by Johannes Guter and starring Werner Krauss, Lydia Potechina and Rudolf Klein-Rogge.

The film's sets were designed by the art director Hermann Warm. It premiered at the Marmorhaus in Berlin.

== Cast ==
- Werner Krauss as Philipp Hogger
- Lydia Potechina as Stepanida
- Rudolf Klein-Rogge as Chauffeur Tom
- Emil Heyse as Clown Apapit
- Joseph Klein as George Garpin
- Philipp Manning as Alter Diener
- J.N. Douvan-Tarzow as Senator Hartwich
- Gustav May as Henry Hogger
- Paul Richter as Francesco
- Greta Schröder as Alegria
- Vicky Werckmeister as Elinor Hartwich

== Bibliography ==
- Hardt, Ursula. From Caligari to California: Erich Pommer's life in the International Film Wars. Berghahn Books, 1996.
