= I Lost My Heart on a Bus =

1929 German film

- Directed by: Carlo Campogalliani; Domenico Gambino
- Written by: Mario Sarocchi (novel); Isa Querio
- Produced by: Jacob Lorsch
- Starring: Domenico Gambino; Truus Van Aalten; Lydia Potechina
- Cinematography: Giovanni Vitrotti
- Music by: Bernard Homola
- Production company: Boston-Films
- Release date: 1 October 1929
- Country: Germany
- Languages: Silent; German intertitles

I Lost My Heart on a Bus (German: Ich hab mein Herz im Autobus verloren) is a 1929 German silent comedy film directed by Carlo Campogalliani and Domenico Gambino and starring Domenico Gambino, Truus Van Aalten and Lydia Potechina. The title is a reference to a popular song "I Lost My Heart in Heidelberg". It was made in Italy.

== Cast ==
- Domenico Gambino as Tommy
- Truus Van Aalten as Dorrit
- Lydia Potechina
- Robert Garrison
- Philipp Manning
- Karl Harbacher
- Karl Junge-Swinburne
- Margarete Sachse

== Bibliography ==
- Alfred Krautz. International directory of cinematographers, set- and costume designers in film, Volume 4. Saur, 1984.
