= Michael (1924 film) =

1924 German silent drama film by Carl Theodor Dreyer

- Directed by: Carl Theodor Dreyer
- Screenplay by: Thea von Harbou; Carl Theodor Dreyer
- Based on: Mikaël by Herman Bang
- Produced by: Erich Pommer
- Starring: Benjamin Christensen; Walter Slezak; Max Auzinger; Robert Garrison; Nora Gregor
- Cinematography: Karl Freund; Rudolph Maté
- Production company: Decla-Bioscop AG
- Distributed by: Decla-Bioscop-Verleih GmbH, Berlin
- Release date: 26 September 1924 (Berlin)
- Running time: 90 min. 86 min. (2004 alternate)
- Country: Germany

Michael (also known as Mikaël, Chained: The Story of the Third Sex, and Heart's Desire) is a 1924 German silent drama film directed by Carl Theodor Dreyer. The film stars Walter Slezak as the titular Michael, the young assistant and model to the artist Claude Zoret (Benjamin Christensen). Along with Different from the Others (1919) and Sex in Chains (1928), Michael is widely considered a landmark in gay silent cinema.

The film is based on Herman Bang's 1902 novel Mikaël. It is the second screen adaptation of the book, the first being The Wings, made eight years prior by director Mauritz Stiller. Michael, however, follows Bang's storyline much more closely than the earlier film version did.

== Plot ==
Michael (1924)

A famous painter named Claude Zoret falls in love with one of his models, Michael, and for a time the two live happily as partners. Self-conscious of being considerably older than Michael, Zoret acts jealous and possessive. Michael begins to drift from him, causing Zoret to passive aggressively drive Michael away further. When a bankrupt countess comes to Zoret to have a portrait made she finds Michael to be more receptive to her advances. At her lead, the two quickly become a couple but when she tells Michael she's in need of money, he sells a precious painting Zoret has given him. When Zoret discovers what has been going on, he is crushed and his work suffers terribly.

Michael later steals sketches Zoret made of their time in Algiers, where they first fell in love. Zoret begins work on his masterpiece: a large-scale painting of a man lying on a beach, using Algiers as a background, depicting "a man who has lost everything", as one character put it on first sight of the work.

After completing the painting, Zoret falls ill. Charles Switt sits beside Zoret on his deathbed. Switt had always loved Zoret, and has stayed with him throughout, never criticizing Michael for fear of hurting his unrequited love. Switt sends a message to Michael, telling him that Zoret is dying and to come at once, but the Countess prevents him from getting it. Zoret's last words, which also serve as the prologue to the film, are "Now I can die in peace, for I have seen true love."

== Cast ==
- Walter Slezak as Michael
- Benjamin Christensen as Claude Zoret
- Nora Gregor as Countess Lucia Zamikow
- Robert Garrison as Charles Switt, journalist
- Max Auzinger as Jules, principal steward of the house
- Didier Aslan as Duke de Monthieu
- Alexander Murski as Mr. Adelsskjold
- Grete Mosheim as Mrs. Alice Adelsskjold
- Karl Freund as LeBlanc, art dealer
- Wilhelmine Sandrock as Widow de Monthieu

== Release ==
Michael was shown in Berlin on 26 September 1924.

== Critical reception and legacy ==
Initial responses to the film included some major objections. Film critic Mordaunt Hall, writing in December 1926 for The New York Times, pronounced:

"Chained" is a dull piece of work, redeemed only by some artistic scenes and Benjamin Christensen's able portrayal of Claude Zoret, an artist...The actress cast as a princess does not screen well, and Walter Slezak, who figures as the youth, gives a stilted, amateurish impersonation.

He criticizes the film for what he perceived as opportunism for a German director to take a "fling at France" by filming less than favorable national figures on the screen (Zoret was purportedly based on French sculptor Auguste Rodin). The homosexual undertones also upset reviewers, since "Michael [was] one of the very few big-budget mainstream studio productions from the silent period that [dealt] with homosexuality; although it remains implicit, it was readily apparent to many contemporaries."

After Dreyer had further established himself as a prominent director through his later films – most notably The Passion of Joan of Arc (1928), critics began to reevaluate Michael. From the perspective of auteur theory, this film exhibits many trademark elements of Dreyer's personal directorial style, such as his use of close-ups in a "way that... makes a tranquil picture of overwhelming feelings." It has also been suggested that the film reflects personal feelings harbored by Dreyer after a purported homosexual affair.

The film has been cited to have influenced several directors. Alfred Hitchcock drew upon motifs from Michael for his script for The Blackguard (1925). The film is considered an important early work in gay silent cinema.

== Home media ==
The film was released in Region 2 by Eureka Entertainment Ltd. as part of the Masters of Cinema Series on 25 October 2004 with the title Michael. Two months later on 14 December, Kino International released a Region 1 version with the title Carl Theodor Dreyer's Michael. Kino International retained the copyright in the United States until the film reached the public domain in that country in 2020.
