= Leontine's Husbands =

1928 film

- Directed by: Robert Wiene
- Written by: Alfred Capus (play); Max Glass
- Produced by: Max Glass
- Starring: Claire Rommer; Georg Alexander; Carl Walther Meyer
- Cinematography: Giovanni Vitrotti
- Music by: Giuseppe Becce
- Production company: Max Glass Film
- Distributed by: Terra Film
- Release date: 25 September 1928
- Country: Germany
- Languages: Silent; German intertitles

Leontine's Husbands (German: Leontines Ehemänner) is a 1928 German silent comedy film directed by Robert Wiene and starring Claire Rommer, Georg Alexander and Carl Walther Meyer. It was based on a play by Alfred Capus (Les Maris de Léontine). A French dancer works her way through a series of husbands, spending their money. The film received poor reviews from critics, who expected better from the director.

It was produced by Max Glass.

== Cast ==
- Claire Rommer - Leontine
- Georg Alexander
- Carl Walther Meyer
- Adele Sandrock
- Luigi Serventi
- Oskar Sima
- Lotte Stein
- Truus Van Aalten
- Alexa von Porembsky

== Bibliography ==
- Jung, Uli & Schatzberg, Walter. Beyond Caligari: The Films of Robert Wiene. Berghahn Books, 1999.
