= A Woman Like You (1933 film) =

1933 film directed by Carl Boese

- Directed by: Carl Boese
- Written by: Georg C. Klaren
- Produced by: Otto Ernst Lubitz
- Starring: Liane Haid; Georg Alexander; S. Z. Sakall
- Cinematography: Franz Koch; Reimar Kuntze
- Edited by: Hilde Grebner
- Music by: Willy Engel-Berger
- Production company: Atalanta-Film
- Distributed by: Bavaria Film
- Release date: 14 February 1933
- Running time: 89 minutes
- Country: Germany
- Language: German

A Woman Like You (German: Eine Frau wie Du) is a 1933 German comedy film directed by Carl Boese and starring Liane Haid, Georg Alexander, and S. Z. Sakall.It was shot at the Bavaria Studios in Munich and on location in Garmisch-Partenkirchen. The film's sets were designed by the art director Ludwig Reiber.

== Cast ==
- Liane Haid as Erika
- Georg Alexander as Alwin Roehn
- S. Z. Sakall as Theobald Roehn, Fabrikant
- Adele Sandrock as Freifrau von der Heyde
- Fritz Kampers as Klemm-Maxe
- Fritz Odemar as Herr von Hohensee
- Georgia Lind as Mieze, die Ganovenbraut
- Josef Eichheim as Dorfgendarm Müller III
- Fritz Fischer as Refrainsänger
- Max Schreck as Dr. Kurtz, Amtsarzt
- Max Weydner as Balder, Polizeihauptmann
- Peter Kreuder as Ein Klavierspieler
- Mina Höcker-Behrens as Frau Krause, Wirtschafterin
- Herbert Langhofer as Gastwirt
- Julius Falkenstein
- Liesl Karlstadt
- Arthur Peiser

== Bibliography ==
- Bock, Hans-Michael; Bergfelder, Tim, eds. (2009). The Concise Cinegraph: Encyclopaedia of German Cinema. New York: Berghahn Books. ISBN 978-1-57181-655-9.
