= The Fight with the Dragon =

1935 film

- Directed by: Franz Seitz
- Written by: Joseph Dalman; Joe Stöckel
- Produced by: Otto Ernst Lubitz
- Starring: Adele Sandrock; Joe Stöckel; Lucie Englisch
- Cinematography: Franz Koch
- Edited by: Gottlieb Madl
- Music by: Toni Thoms
- Production company: Bavaria Film
- Distributed by: Bavaria Film
- Release date: 14 June 1935
- Country: Germany
- Language: German

The Fight with the Dragon (German: Der Kampf mit dem Drachen) is a 1935 German comedy film directed by Franz Seitz and starring Adele Sandrock, Joe Stöckel and Hans Schlenck.

It was made at the Bavaria Studios in Munich. The film's sets were designed by the art director Max Seefelder.

== Synopsis ==
A countess stubbornly refuses to sell her three hundred year-old brewery to a rival.

== Cast ==
- Adele Sandrock as Gräfin Drachenstein
- Joe Stöckel as Bachmeier
- Hans Schlenck as Fritz Carsten
- Lucie Englisch as Trude Carsten
- Gretl Theimer as Komtess Helene
- Walter Lantzsch as Carsten Sr.
- Josef Eichheim as Nickelmann
- Fritz Odemar as Bihold
- Theodor Autzinger as Stelzer
- Maria Byk as Wirtschafterin
- Justus Paris as Karl
- Karl Elzer as Spange

== Bibliography ==
- Krautz, Alfred (1984). International directory of cinematographers, set- and costume designers in film. Vol. 4. Saur. ISBN 978-3-598-21434-9.
