= Annelies Reinhold =

Austrian actress (1917–2007)

- Born: 5 January 1917; Meran, Tyrol, Austro-Hungarian Empire
- Died: 6 January 2007 (aged 90); Oldenburg, Germany
- Occupation: Actress
- Years active: 1940–1950 (film)

Annelies Reinhold (5 January 1917 – 6 January 2007) was an Austrian film actress. She actively starred in films over a duration of 10 years.

== Selected filmography ==
- The Three Codonas (1940)
- Violanta (1942)
- Paracelsus (1943)
- The Roedern Affair (1944)
- Night of the Twelve (1949)
- Duel with Death (1949)
- A Heart Beats for You (1949)
- King for One Night (1950)

== Bibliography ==
- Rolf Giesen. Nazi Propaganda Films: A History and Filmography. McFarland, 2003.
