= Poor Little Sif =

1927 film

- Directed by: Arthur Bergen
- Written by: Hermanna Barkhausen; Fritz Reck-Malleczewen (novel)
- Starring: Paul Wegener; Adele Sandrock; Jakob Tiedtke
- Cinematography: Paul Holzki
- Music by: Hans May
- Production company: Münchner Lichtspielkunst
- Distributed by: Süd-Film
- Release date: 1 September 1927
- Country: Germany
- Languages: Silent; German intertitles

Poor Little Sif (German: Arme kleine Sif) is a 1927 German silent comedy film directed by Arthur Bergen and starring Paul Wegener, Adele Sandrock, and Jakob Tiedtke.

It was made at the Emelka Studios in Munich. The film's art direction was by Botho Hoefer and August Rinaldi.

== Cast ==
- Paul Wegener
- Adele Sandrock
- Jakob Tiedtke
- Hans Heinrich von Twardowski
- Olga Engl
- Robert Garrison
- Robert Hagedorn
- Grete Mosheim
- Anton Pointner
- Frida Richard

== Bibliography ==
- Grange, William (2008). Cultural Chronicle of the Weimar Republic. Lanham, MD: Scarecrow Press. ISBN 978-0-8108-5967-8.
