= Hans Schlenck =

German actor

Hans Schlenck (born 14 March 1901 in Bischofsheim an der Rhön – 13 November 1944) was a German stage and film actor. He died in World War II.

== Filmography ==
Year	Title	Role	Notes
1932	Cruiser Emden	Adjutant	
1932	A Man with Heart		
1933	The Country Schoolmaster	Uwe Karsten Alslew, der Dorfschulmeister	
1934	Hubertus Castle	Werner Forbeck, ein Maler	
1934	Farewell Waltz	Franz Liszt	
1934	Love and the First Railway	Ferdinand Miller, Dampfwagen-Ingenieur	
1934	Um das Menschenrecht	Hans, Frontkamerad	
1935	The Fight with the Dragon	Fritz Carsten	
1935	The King's Prisoner	Leutnant von Paul	
1936	Love's Awakening	Dr. Breitner - sein Assistent	
1936	Maria the Maid	Soldier Franz	
1936	Susanne in the Bath	Maler Schrack, Lehrer an der Kunstschule	
1942	Violanta	Andreas Renner	
1951	Eyes of Love	Dr. Lamprecht	(final film role)
