= Love's Awakening (1936 film) =

1936 film

- Directed by: Herbert Maisch
- Written by: Fred Andreas; Jan Fethke; Philipp Lothar Mayring
- Starring: Eugen Klöpfer; Karin Hardt; Hans Schlenck
- Cinematography: Emil Schünemann
- Music by: Alois Melichar
- Production company: Fabrikation Deutscher Filme
- Distributed by: Terra Film
- Release date: 24 April 1936
- Running time: 89 minutes
- Country: Germany
- Language: German

Love's Awakening (German: Liebeserwachen) is a 1936 German drama film directed by Herbert Maisch and starring Eugen Klöpfer, Karin Hardt and Hans Schlenck. It was shot at the Marienfelde Studios of Terra Film in Berlin.

== Cast ==
- Eugen Klöpfer as Dr. Bergriedel - Bezirkstierarzt
- Karin Hardt as Hanni - his daughter
- Hans Schlenck as Dr. Breitner - his Assistant
- Walter Rilla as Robert Lund - Violinvirtuose
- Walter Steinbeck as Dudek - his Manager
- Eliza Illiard as Dora Brink
- Heinz Salfner as Mr. Burns - American concert agent
- Gina Falckenberg as Lilian - his daughter
- Josefine Dora as Frau Schupperer
- Wolfgang von Schwindt as the hotel porter
- Anita Düwell
- Franz Klebusch
- Erich Dunskus
- Angelo Ferrari
- Heinrich Schlusnus as Singer

== Bibliography ==
- Klaus, Ulrich J. Deutsche Tonfilme: Jahrgang 1936. Klaus-Archiv, 1988.
- Rentschler, Eric (1996). The Ministry of Illusion: Nazi Cinema and Its Afterlife. Harvard University Press. ISBN 978-0-674-57640-7.
