= Winfried Zillig =

German composer, musicologist and conductor (1905–1963)

Winfried Zillig (1 April 1905 – 18 December 1963) was a German composer, music theorist, and conductor.

== Biography ==
Zillig was born in Würzburg to the teacher Peter Zillig. After leaving school, Zillig studied law and music. One of his teachers there was Hermann Zilcher. In Vienna he was a private pupil of Arnold Schoenberg, later following him to Berlin. His first compositions date from this time.

In 1927 he became the assistant of Erich Kleiber at the Berlin State Opera. A short time later he became repetiteur to the Oldenburg Opera. In the years 1932 to 1937, he acted as repetiteur and Kapellmeister at the Düsseldorf Opera. Positions followed as Kapellmeister in Essen and at the beginning of the 1940s as the musical leader of the Posen Opera. After the end of World War II he became the first Kapellmeister of the Düsseldorfer Oper. In the years 1947 to 1951 he occupied the position of conductor at the hr-Sinfonieorchester. He also acted as guest conductor of the Radio Éireann Symphony Orchestra in the early months of 1953. After 1959 he led the musical division of Norddeutscher Rundfunk. Zillig died in 1963 in Hamburg.

Winfried Zillig was very productive as a composer. His output includes operas, oratorios, passions, choral music, serenades, string quartets, and other Chamber music, as well as lieder and suites. He was also responsible for completing the score of the oratorio Die Jakobsleiter, which his former teacher Arnold Schoenberg had left unfinished, at the request of Schönberg's widow. Furthermore, he made a name for himself as a music theorist with an emphasis on twelve-tone technique.

== Works ==
- Operas
  - Das Opfer (1937)
  - Die Windsbraut (opera in three Acts)
  - Troilus und Cressida (opera in six scenes)
  - Die Verlobung in San Domingo (opera in one Act)
  - Bauernpassion (TV opera)
- Concertos
  - Osterkonzert
  - Tanzsymphonie
  - Lustspielsuite
  - Concerto for Violoncello und Brass Orchestra (1934/1952)
- Choral
  - Der Einsiedler
  - Chorfantasie über ein Fragment von Hölderlin (1956)
- Lieder
  - Lieder des Herbstes (1959)
  - Lieder des Abschieds nach Gedichten von Rilke (1963)
  - Salve
- Film scores
  - The Rider on the White Horse (1934)
  - Violanta (1942)
  - Sommernächte (1944)
  - King for One Night (1950)
  - Sarajevo (1955)
  - Jonas (1957)
  - Traumstraße der Welt (1958)
  - Bilderbuch Gottes (1960)
  - Traumstraße der Welt – 2. Teil (1961)
  - Panamericana – Traumstraße der Welt (1968)
- Writings
  - Aufsatz über die Zwölftonmethode
  - Schönbergs Aron und Moses
  - Schönbergs Jakobsleiter
