= The Country Schoolmaster (1933 film) =

1933 film

- Directed by: Carl Heinz Wolff
- Written by: Felicitas Rose (novel); Kurt Heynicke; Christian Uhlenbrock
- Produced by: Alfred Zeisler
- Starring: Hans Schlenck; Marianne Hoppe; Heinrich Heilinger
- Cinematography: Werner Brandes
- Edited by: Wolfgang Becker
- Music by: Ludwig Schmidseder
- Production company: UFA
- Distributed by: UFA
- Release date: 3 November 1933
- Running time: 94 minutes
- Country: Germany
- Language: German

The Country Schoolmaster or Country Schoolmaster Uwe Karsten (German: Heideschulmeister Uwe Karsten) is a 1933 German drama film directed by Carl Heinz Wolff and starring Hans Schlenck, Marianne Hoppe and Heinrich Heilinger. It was remade in 1954.

The film's art direction was by Otto Hunte and Willy Schiller.

== Cast ==
- Hans Schlenck as Uwe Karsten Alslew, der Dorfschulmeister
- Marianne Hoppe as Ursula Diewen
- Heinrich Heilinger as Heinrich Heinsius
- Brigitte Horney as Martha Detlefsen
- Olga Chekhova as Teresa van der Straaten
- Walter Steinbeck as Ernst Diewen, Handelsherr
- Carl Auen as Pastor Sunneby
- Günther Ballier as Klaus Sundewitt, Hilfslehrer
- Jeanette Bethge as Frau Anslew, Uwe Karstens Mutter
- Eberhard Leithoff as Ludwig Diewen, der Sohn
- Ernst Behmer as Krüger, ein Winkelbankier
- Paul Henckels as Professor Sieveking
- Maria Karsten as Frau Sundewitt
- Paul Moleska as Ein Bauer
- Ernst Hieber
- Wolfgang Lohmeyer
- Petra Unkel
- Walter Vollmann

== Bibliography ==
- Williams, Alan (2002). Film and Nationalism. Rutgers University Press. ISBN 978-0-8135-3040-6.
