= Das Opfer (Zillig) =

Opera by Winfried Zillig

- Opera by Winfried Zillig
- Translation: The Sacrifice
- Librettist: Reinhard Goering
- Language: German
- Based on: Die Südpolexpedition des Kapitäns Scott, 1929 play by Reinhard Goering
- Premiere: 12 November 1937; Hamburg State Opera

Das Opfer (English: The Sacrifice) is a one-act opera by Winfried Zillig.

== Libretto ==
The German libretto is by Reinhard Goering, adapted from his prizewinning three-act play Die Südpolexpedition des Kapitäns Scott (published in 1929). Both the play and the opera are based on the Terra Nova Expedition led by Robert Falcon Scott.

Zillig, an admirer of Die Südpolexpedition, asked Goering to adapt his play into an opera libretto in 1930. The playwright delivered the libretto to Zillig in April 1936, before dying by suicide in October of the same year. The libretto of Das Opfer has drawn notoriety because the chorus members dress as penguins for much of the opera (though penguins do not inhabit the Antarctic Plateau, where the action is set). They represent "hostile nature" (feindselige Natur) over which Oates triumphs by his act of sacrifice.

== Roles ==
Roles and voice types
Role	Voice type
Robert Falcon Scott	bass
Edward Wilson	baritone
Henry Bowers	tenor
Lawrence Oates	baritone
Chorus of penguins; four-part mixed chorus; dancers

== Synopsis ==
Time: 1912
Place: South Pole

=== Part One ===
In an Antarctic night, four explorers slowly come into view. The overture begins. Members of the chorus transform themselves into penguins by donning masks and costumes.

Scott, Wilson, and Bowers appear from the background, with Oates further behind. They are the only surviving members of the expedition.

Scott states that Oates' frozen feet are hampering the progress of the other three men, but all agree that they must not abandon him. As Oates slowly approaches, the chorus of penguins mocks him. Oates decides to ask the others whether there is any realistic hope that he will survive the expedition. The penguins rejoice that the humans will perish and they will soon be undisputed masters of their homeland again.

=== Part Two ===
Scott, Wilson and Bowers set up their tent and go inside. Oates hears the other three talking about him and decides to "disappear", but Bowers sees him and pushes him into the tent.

=== Part Three ===
A storm shakes the tent. Oates awakens and wants to leave the tent. Scott urges him to remain inside, but Oates ignores him and goes outside. Bowers commands him to return inside, but he is also ignored. The other three men step outside the tent but are unable to stop Oates as he disappears into the snow to his death. The chorus of penguins perform a Freudentanz (joyful dance) but then express admiration for Oates' act of self-sacrifice.

Scott, Bowers and Wilson show their respect for Oates and their admiration for his fulfillment of the highest duty.

The penguins remove their costumes. The orchestra plays a fortissimo passage to represent the storm. The final choral number, sung pianissimo, praises the dead and sings of immortality.

== Music and reception ==
Zillig, a pupil of Arnold Schoenberg, used twelve-tone technique to compose triadic music.

The opera received mixed reviews and closed prematurely after four performances. It may have been unpopular or suppressed in Nazi Germany, where atonal music was generally denounced as cultural Bolshevism or degenerate art. Nonetheless, Zillig was later commissioned to write incidental music for the Reichsfestspiele (Reich Theatre Festival), the Reich-sponsored adaptation of the Heidelberger Schlossfestspiele (Heidelberg Castle Festival).

In West Germany, Zillig attributed the opera's failure to suppression, perhaps self-servingly. It was revived at the Staatstheater Kassel in 1961.
