= Mikosch Comes In (1928 film) =

1928 film

- Directed by: Rolf Randolf
- Written by: Emanuel Alfieri; Paul Morgan
- Starring: Gyula Szőreghy; Lydia Potechina; Claire Rommer
- Cinematography: Willy Hameister
- Production company: Phönix-Film
- Distributed by: Deutsch-Russische Film-Allianz
- Release date: 1928
- Country: Germany
- Languages: Silent; German intertitles

Mikosch Comes In (German: Mikosch rückt ein) is a 1928 German silent comedy film directed by Rolf Randolf and starring Gyula Szőreghy, Lydia Potechina, and Claire Rommer.

The film's sets were designed by the art director Ernő Metzner.

== Cast ==
- Gyula Szőreghy as Fabrikant Mikosch Braun
- Lydia Potechina as Elsa
- Claire Rommer as Lilly, seine Tochter
- Hans Junkermann as Major Czupszik
- Josefine Dora as Seine Frau
- Georg Alexander as Oberl. v. Banfy
- Leo Peukert as Toni Hupfner
- Elisabeth Pinajeff as Die fesche Mizzi
- Paul Morgan as Cromwell
- Harry Frank as Alfred Braun
- Maude Harris as Das Hausmädchen
- John Mylong as Wachtmeister Rott

== Bibliography ==
- Krautz, Alfred (1984). International Directory of Cinematographers, Set- and Costume Designers in Film. Vol. 4. Munich: Saur. ISBN 978-3-598-21434-9.
