= Liesl Karlstadt =

German actress (1892–1960)

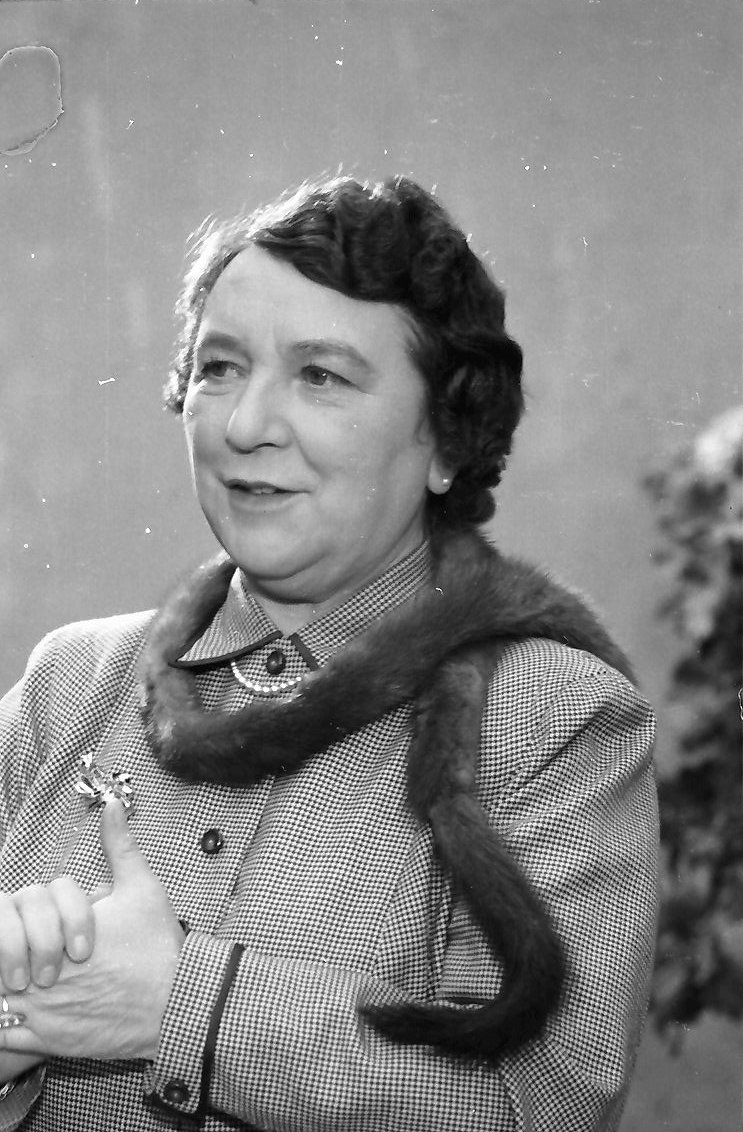
- Karlstadt in 1951
- Born: Elisabeth Wellano; 12 December 1892; Munich, German Empire
- Died: 27 June 1960 (aged 67); Garmisch-Partenkirchen, West Germany
- Occupation: Actress
- Years active: 1913–1960

Liesl Karlstadt (German: [liːzl̩ ˈkaʁlʃtat]; born Elisabeth Wellano, 12 December 1892 – 27 June 1960) was a German actress and cabaret performer. Alongside Karl Valentin, she set the tone for a generation of popular culture in Munich. She appeared in more than 70 films between 1913 and 1960.

== Selected filmography ==
- The Eccentric (1929)
- The Bartered Bride (1932)
- Must We Get Divorced? (1933)
- A Woman Like You (1933)
- Fruit in the Neighbour's Garden (1935)
- Street Music (1936)
- Thunder, Lightning and Sunshine (1936)
- Girls' Dormitory (1936)
- Venus on Trial (1941)
- Don't Talk to Me About Love (1943)
- Journey into the Past (1943)
- After the Rain Comes Sunshine (1949)
- By a Nose (1949)
- Two Times Lotte (1950)
- The Lady in Black (1951)
- Desires (1952)
- That Can Happen to Anyone (1952)
- The Exchange (1952)
- As Long as You're Near Me (1953)
- Fanfares of Love (1953)
- Fireworks (1954)
- The Missing Miniature (1954)
- Marriages Forbidden (1957)
- A Piece of Heaven (1957)
- Salzburg Stories (1957)
- Wir Wunderkinder (1958)
- My Ninety Nine Brides (1958)
- Oh! This Bavaria! (1960)
- Do Not Send Your Wife to Italy (1960)
- Fanfare of Marriage (1963)
