= Adele Sandrock =

German actress (1863–1937)

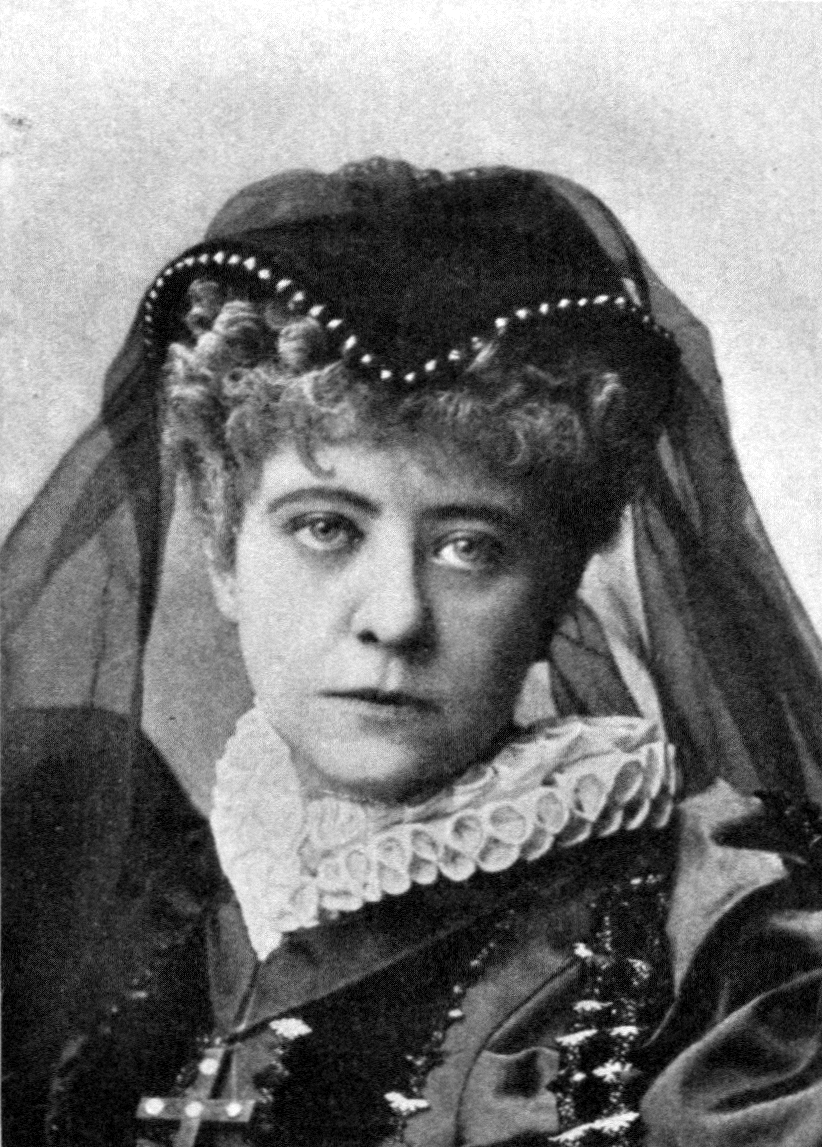
- Sandrock in 1900
- Born: 19 August 1863; Rotterdam, Netherlands
- Died: 30 August 1937 (aged 74); Berlin, Germany
- Burial place: Vienna, Austria
- Occupation: Actress
- Years active: 1878–1936
- Relatives: Wilhelmine Sandrock (sister)

Adele Sandrock (German: [aˈdeːlə ˈzantˌʁɔk]; 19 August 1863 – 30 August 1937) was a German actress. After a successful theatrical career, she became one of the first German movie stars.

== Early life ==
Sandrock was born in Rotterdam, Netherlands, the daughter of the German merchant Eduard Sandrock (1834–1897) and his Dutch wife, Johanna Simonetta ten Hagen (1833–1917). With sister Wilhelmine (1861-1948) and brother Christian (1862–1924), she grew up in Rotterdam, and, after her parents' divorce on 15 November 1869, in Berlin, where she learned German.

== Career ==
In 1878 at the age of fifteen, Sandrock made her debut as Selma in Mutter und Sohn by Charlotte Birch-Pfeiffer. In Berlin she met the famous Meiningen Ensemble and achieved success at the Meiningen Court Theatre where her first role was Luise in Friedrich Schiller's Intrigue and Love, followed by further engagements in Moscow, Wiener Neustadt, and Budapest.

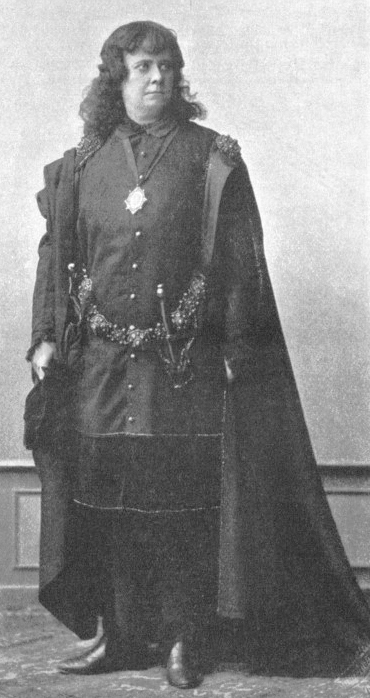
Sandrock as Prince Hamlet, 1900

In 1889, she had her breakthrough at the Theater an der Wien in Vienna in the role of Isabella in Der Fall Clémenceau (L'Affaire Clémenceau) by Alexandre Dumas Fils and Armand d'Artois. Burgtheater star Charlotte Wolter was her great supporter and even borrowed her a fur coat for her costume. She even noted of her: "Finally, a real talent." Afterwards, from 1899 to 1895 she became a member of the Volkstheater ensemble. She created a number of major roles for modern playwrights including Henrik Ibsen and Arthur Schnitzler, with whom she had a notoriously stormy affair and who based the role of The Actress in his play La Ronde on her. She also took an American tour.

She was briefly engaged to marry author Alexander Roda Roda, who integrated the experience in his writing. From 1895, she performed at the Burgtheater in the character type of tragic heroines. She provoked disagreement concerning both her contract and her private life, and left for an extended European tour in 1898. Back at the Volkstheater in 1902, she was not able to continue her success on the stage. In 1905, she moved back to Berlin, to work at the Deutsches Theater led by Max Reinhardt.

In 1911 Sandrock made her silent film debut in the short film Marianne, ein Weib aus dem Volke. She acted in more than 140 films, working with a number of directors including Reinhold Schünzel and Hans Hinrich, and continued her career into the sound film era with her characteristic dark voice. Her autobiography, Mein Leben (My Life), was published in German in 1940.

== Death ==
Sandrock died on 30 August 1937 in Berlin, Germany, at the age of 74. Her coffin was transferred to Vienna on 6 September and she was buried at the Matzleinsdorf Protestant Cemetery.

== Selected filmography ==
- Unusable (1917)
- The Galley Slave (1919)
- Patience (1920)
- Hearts Are Trumps (1920)
- The Last Kolczaks (1920)
- Lady Hamilton (1921)
- Violet (1921)
- Children of Darkness (1921)
- Nights of Terror (1921)
- The Story of Christine von Herre (1921)
- The Black Panther (1921)
- Lucrezia Borgia (1922)
- The Golden Net (1922)
- The Hungarian Princess (1923)
- The Love of a Queen (1923)
- Helena (1924)
- The Girl with a Patron (1925)
- Ash Wednesday (1925)
- German Hearts on the German Rhine (1926)
- Orphan of Lowood (1926)
- Trude (1926)
- Assassination (1927)
- Rhenish Girls and Rhenish Wine (1927)
- Light-Hearted Isabel (1927)
- German Women – German Faithfulness (1927)
- Queen Louise (1927)
- The Mistress (1927)
- Poor Little Sif (1927)
- The City of a Thousand Delights (1927)
- The Girl with the Five Zeros (1927)
- Heaven on Earth (1927)
- Leontine's Husbands (1928)
- Lotte (1928)
- Der Ladenprinz (1928)
- Serenissimus and the Last Virgin (1928)
- Mary Lou (1928)
- Mariett Dances Today (1928)
- Misled Youth (1929)
- Katharina Knie (1929)
- My Daughter's Tutor (1929)
- Revolt in the Batchelor's House (1929)
- The Circus Princess (1929)
- Fräulein Else (1929)
- Danube Waltz (1930)
- Next, Please! (1930)
- The Great Longing (1930)
- Die zärtlichen Verwandten (1930)
- A Thousand Words of German (1930)
- Scandalous Eva (1930)
- The Battle of Bademunde (1931)
- Queen of the Night (1931)
- Without Meyer, No Celebration is Complete (1931)
- Her Majesty the Barmaid (1931)
- Terror of the Garrison (1931)
- The Forester's Daughter (1931)
- The Soaring Maiden (1931)
- Everyone Asks for Erika (1931)
- Frederica (1932)
- A Tremendously Rich Man (1932)
- The Mad Bomberg (1932)
- The Magic Top Hat (1932)
- For Once I'd Like to Have No Troubles (1932)
- Love at First Sight (1932)
- A Mad Idea (1932)
- I Do Not Want to Know Who You Are (1932)
- The Beautiful Adventure (1932)
- The Victor (1932)
- The Importance of Being Earnest (1932)
- The Big Bluff (1933)
- Bon Voyage (1933)
- Little Girl, Great Fortune (1933)
- A Woman Like You (1933)
- Daughter of the Regiment (1933)
- The English Marriage (1934)
- The Brenken Case (1934)
- Gypsy Blood (1934)
- The Gentleman Without a Residence (1934)
- Spring Parade (1934)
- Count Woronzeff (1934)
- The Last Waltz (1934)
- Paganini (1934)
- Amphitryon (1935)
- Every Day Isn't Sunday (1935)
- The Fight with the Dragon (1935)
- The King's Prisoner (1935)
- Eva (1935)
- Make Me Happy (1935)
- Circus Saran (1935)
- Heaven on Earth (1935)
- Fruit in the Neighbour's Garden (1935)
- The Empress's Favourite (1936)
- The Fairy Doll (1936)
- There Were Two Bachelors (1936)
- The Bashful Casanova (1936)
- Rendezvous in Vienna (1936)
