= Tales from the Vienna Woods =

Waltz composed in 1868 by Johann Strauss II

Beginning of zither solo in the introduction

"Tales from the Vienna Woods" (German: "Geschichten aus dem Wienerwald", occasionally "G'schichten aus dem Wienerwald") is a waltz by Johann Strauss II.

"Geschichten aus dem Wienerwald" (12:07)

Composed in 1868, "Geschichten aus dem Wienerwald", Op. 325, was one of six Viennese waltzes by Johann Strauss II which featured a virtuoso part for zither. The title of Strauss' dance recalls the folk music of the inhabitants of the Vienna Woods.

== Composition notes ==
The waltz's introduction is one of the longest he ever wrote for a waltz, 119 bars in the musical score. It starts in C major, intertwining with F major before gaining ascendancy in volume and mood, finishing with a long pause. The second part is in the key of G major, with a solo violin incorporating material which appears again in successive waltz sections. A short flute cadenza evoking birdsong comes in, and moves on to the zither solo, marked moderato. The zither part involves two sub-sections of its own; the slowish ländler tempo and its more vigorous counterpart, with the direction of vivace (quickly). If a zither is unavailable, a string quartet plays the zither themes instead. Loud orchestral chords bring the waltz back to the familiar waltz theme in F major.

Waltz sections 2A and 2B are in B♭ major, whereas waltz 3A is in E♭ major with a quick section in B♭ in waltz 3B. The entire waltz section 4 is in B♭ as well, and waltz section 5 is wholly in E♭. Waltz 5B contains the customary climax with cymbals and is loudly played. After a brief and tense coda, waltz 1A and 2B make a reappearance. As the waltz approaches its end, the zither solo makes another appearance, reprising its earlier melody in the introduction. A crescendo in the final bars concludes with a brass flourish and snare drumroll.

== Orchestration ==
Woodwinds

2 Flutes (Fl. 2 doubling Piccolo)
2 Oboes
2 Clarinets in C

Cl. 1 doubling in B♭
Cl. 2 doubling E♭ clarinet

2 Bassoons

Brass

4 Horns in F
3 Trumpets in F
2 Trombones
Bass trombone
Tuba

Percussion

Timpani
Snare drum
Triangle
Bass drum
Cymbals

Strings

Zither
Harp
Violins I, II
Violas
Violoncellos
Double basses

A string ensemble (for example, four violins, two violas, and two cellos) may be substituted in the absence of a zither.

== In popular culture ==
The Kleist Prize-winning drama Geschichten aus dem Wiener Wald (1931), by Ödön von Horváth and the live-action films Tales from the Vienna Woods (1928) and Tales from the Vienna Woods (1934) take their titles from this waltz, as does the MGM cartoon short Tales from the Vienna Woods (1934)

The 1938 MGM film The Great Waltz loosely inspired by the life of Johann Strauss II tells a fictional story of the waltz's creation.

The waltz was also featured in a condensed version in the first segment of the 1943 Warner Bros. Merrie Melodies animated short A Corny Concerto and also prominently in the 1987 television film Escape from Sobibor.
