= Ernő Verebes =

Hungarian actor (1902–1971)

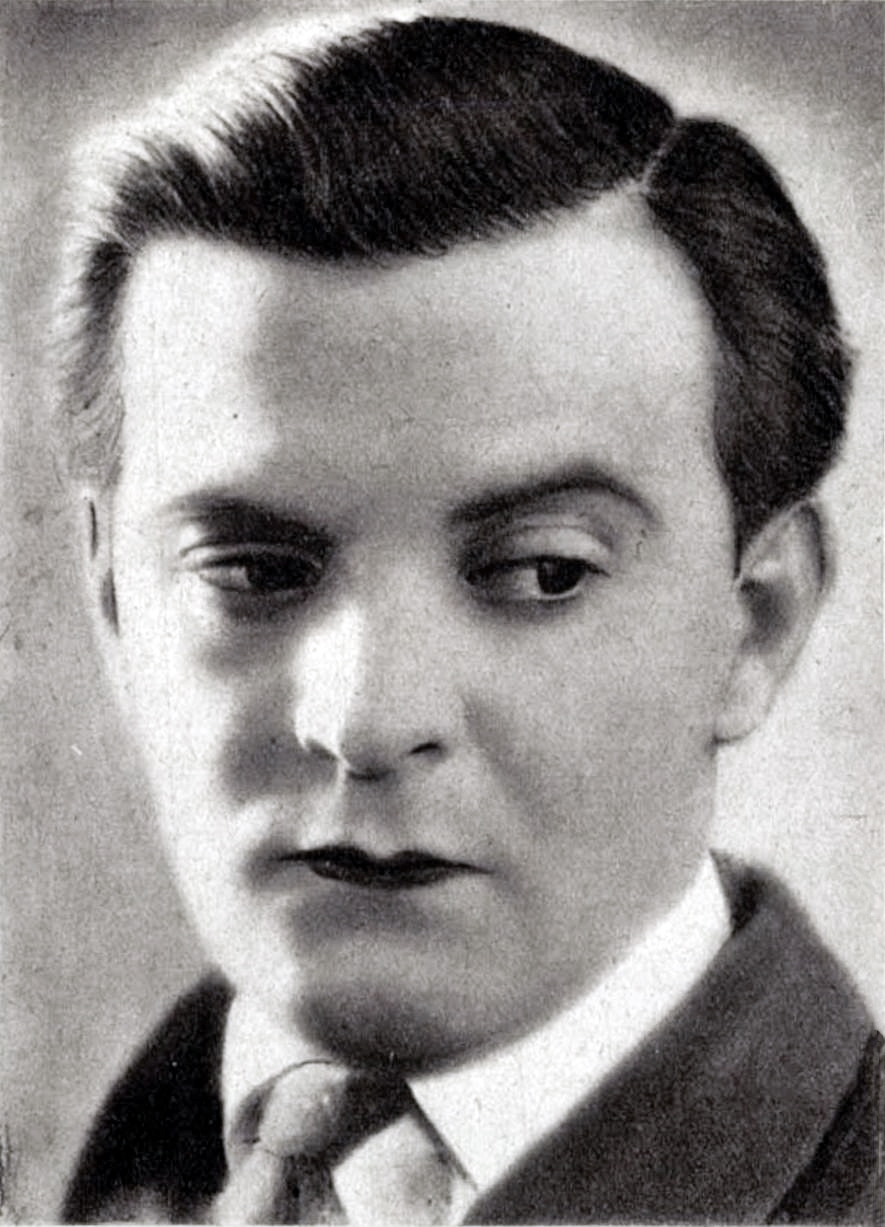
- Verebes in 1928
- Born: Ernst Weiss; December 6, 1902; New York City, U.S.
- Died: June 13, 1971 (aged 68); Woodland Hills, California, U.S.
- Years active: 1915–1953

Ernő Verebes (born Ernst Weiss, December 6, 1902 – June 13, 1971) was a Hungarian-American actor who began his career in Hungarian silent films in 1915. During his film career he worked and lived in Hungary, Germany and in the United States. He was born into a Hungarian emigrant family in New York, but his family later returned to Austria-Hungary.

Verebes was successful in Germany during the 1920s and early 1930s, often appearing in elegant and comedic roles. The Jewish actor had to leave Germany after the Nazi Party got into power. He returned to the United States in the late 1930s, but had to content himself with mostly small roles. He retired in 1953 after more than 140 films.

== Selected filmography ==
In Europe:

- Romlott emberek között (1915)
- Mire megvénülünk (1917) – Áronffy Dezsõ as a boy
- Oliver Twist (1919) – First thief
- Három pár facipö (1920)
- Tamás úrfi kalandjai (1920)
- Az ötödik osztály (1920) – Bill
- Péntek este (1921) – Rabbi's son
- Lúdas Matyi (1922) – Lúdas Matyi
- A 3 pofon (1923)
- Holnap kezdödik az élet (1924) – Barna
- A Pál-utcai fiúk (1925) – Boka János
- Countess Maritza (1925) – Baron Koloman Zsupan
- Der Mann im Sattel (1925) - Mann im Sattel
- Should We Be Silent? (1926) - Gerd
- Torments of the Night (1926) - Kurt Elversam
- The Woman in Gold (1926)
- Harry Hill auf Welle 1000 (1926)
- The Third Squadron (1926) - Leutnant Edler
- The Blue Danube (1926) - Graf Rudi Zirsky
- The Violet Eater (1926) - Bobby Sterzl
- Les voleurs de gloire (1926) - Georges Lenoir
- Fadette (1926) - Sylvaine
- Unmarried Daughters (1926) - Heidemann
- Tragedy of a Marriage (1927)
- The Gypsy Baron (1927) - Graf Ottokar
- The Eighteen Year Old (1927) - Gaston Ravel
- The Queen Was in the Parlour (1927) - Adjudant der Königin
- Todessturz im Zirkus Cesarelli (1927)
- Bigamie (1927) - Tänzer Fred
- Was die Kinder ihren Eltern verschweigen (1927)
- Ghost Train (1927) - Richard Winthrop
- The Beggar Student (1927) - Jan, Student
- Im Luxuszug (1927) - Manuel
- The Seventh Veil (1927)
- Majestät schneidet Bubiköpfe (1928)
- Six Girls and a Room for the Night (1928)
- Who Invented Divorce? (1928)
- The Gallant Hussar (1928) - Bubenyik
- Kaczmarek (1928)
- Rich, Young and Beautiful (1928) - Emanuel, ein Mathematiker
- Serenissimus and the Last Virgin (1928) - Bob, Tanz-Adjutant
- Der moderne Casanova (1928)
- Die lustigen Vagabunden (1928) - August Fliederbusch, Landstreicher
- The Circus Princess (1929)
- The Gypsy Chief (1929)
- A Pál -utcai fúk (1929)
- The Black Domino (1929) - Juliano
- Crucified Girl (1929)
- Land Without Women (1929) - O'Donegan - goldminer in Coolgardie
- Queen of Fashion (1929) - Leo Sanders
- Kameradschaftsehe (1929)
- My Daughter's Tutor (1930)
- Kamarádské manzelství (1930) - Jirí Havelka
- Danube Waltz (1930) - Ognatz Stössl - pianist
- Delicatessen (1930)
- The Great Longing (1930) - Himself, Ernst Verebes
- Die Jagd nach der Million (1930) - Carlos
- A Tango for You (1930) - Alfonso di Bei Juanos, Tangokapellmeister
- Die Csikosbaroneß (1930) - Leutnant Graf Kövesi
- Va Banque (1930) - Reporter Freddy Kallai
- The Song Is Ended (1930) - Jerome Toenli
- Retreat on the Rhine (1930) - Max Hoffmann, Kapellmeister
- Tingel-Tangel (1930) - Billie
- Petit officier... Adieu! (1930) - Tönli
- People on Sunday (1930) - Himself
- Madame Pompadour (1931) - Marcel de Clermount, Kadett
- Die Faschingsfee (1931) - Alfred v. Mützelburg
- Der Tanzhusar (1931) - Józsi Ballok, Leutnant Husaren-Regiment Nr. 3
- Once I Loved a Girl in Vienna (1931) - Imre von Kövesháza - Fähnrich
- Walzerparadies (1931) - Der Klavierspieler
- When the Soldiers (1931) - Franzl - Militärmusikant
- The Secret of the Red Cat (1931) - André Dupont, Schauspieler
- By a Nose (1931) - Teddy, ein Mixer
- Trara um Liebe (1931) - Leutnant Ferry von Werthern
- My Heart Longs for Love (1931) - Fritz Heberlein
- Everyone Asks for Erika (1931) - Otto Rebes - Redakteur
- Victoria and Her Hussar (1931) - Jancyi, Koltays Bursche
- Things Are Getting Better Already (1932) - Willi Bertram
- The Company's in Love (1932) - Heinrich Pulver - Regieassist.
- Two in a Car (1932)
- Once There Was a Waltz (1932) - Gustl Linzer
- All is at Stake (1932)
- Countess Mariza (1932) - Koloman Zsupan
- Traum von Schönbrunn (1932) - Lieutenant
- The Blue of Heaven (1932) - Der flotte Hugo
- The Flower of Hawaii (1933) - Buffy, Sekretär
- Es war einmal ein Musikus (1933) - Rolf, Student, Heinz's Freund
- A Night in Venice (1934) - Dr. Kovács Jenõ
- Helyet az öregeknek (1934) - Feri, Polgár fia
- Ende schlecht, alles gut (1934) - Viktor's brother Ferry
- Villa for Sale (1935) - Hódy György
- Little Mother (1935) - Servant
- Viereinhalb Musketiere (1935) - Fritz Koerner, violinist
- Catherine the Last (1936) - Tobby, Hans' servant
- Sensation (1936) - Riporter (Keretjáték)
- Hochzeitsreise zu 50% (1937) - Paul Kerekes

In America:

- A Desperate Adventure (1938) - Marcel
- Hotel Imperial (1939) - Ivan (uncredited)
- The Magnificent Fraud (1939) - Castro - Night Club M.C. (uncredited)
- Balalaika (1939) - Danchenoff's Secretary (uncredited)
- Dance, Girl, Dance (1940) - Fitch
- Bitter Sweet (1940) - Orderly (uncredited)
- Underground (1941) - Maxel's Headwaiter (uncredited)
- New Wine (1941) - Karl (uncredited)
- To Be or Not to Be (1942) - Stage Manager (uncredited)
- Moonlight Masquerade (1942) - Count Eric Nordvig
- Desperate Journey (1942) - German Sergeant (uncredited)
- Above Suspicion (1943) - Gestapo Officer (uncredited)
- The Strange Death of Adolf Hitler (1943) - Count Godeck
- None Shall Escape (1944) - Court Clerk (uncredited)
- The Hitler Gang (1944) - Anton Drexler
- The Conspirators (1944) - Cascais Fisherman (uncredited)
- The Climax (1944) - Brunn
- You Came Along (1945) - 400 Club Headwaiter (uncredited)
- Shady Lady (1945) - Proprietor (uncredited)
- Gilda (1946) - Blackjack Dealer (uncredited)
- Tangier (1946) - Capt. Cartiaz
- Easy Come, Easy Go (1947) - Mopsy Marek (uncredited)
- Calcutta (1947) - Frenchman (uncredited)
- Dear Ruth (1947) - Headwaiter (uncredited)
- Northwest Outpost (1947) - Kyril Balinin's Aide
- The Perils of Pauline (1947) - Drawing Room Set Director (uncredited)
- Where There's Life (1947) - Peter Gornics
- The Big Clock (1948) - Waiter
- My Own True Love (1948) - Captain of Waiters (uncredited)
- Alias Nick Beal (1949) - Mr. Cox - Tailor
- Outpost in Morocco (1949) - Bamboule
- The Great Sinner (1949) - Hotel Valet
- Scene of the Crime (1949) - Wine Steward (uncredited)
- Red, Hot and Blue (1949) - Waiter
- My Friend Irma (1949) - Mr. Ubang
- The Great Lover (1949) - Waiter (uncredited)
- Captain Carey, U.S.A. (1949) - Detective
- Copper Canyon (1950) - Professor
- Appointment with Danger (1950) - Window Dresser (uncredited)
- Where Danger Lives (1950) - Waiter (uncredited)
- I'll Get By (1950) - Waiter (uncredited)
- The Goldbergs (1950) - Mr. Mendell
- His Kind of Woman (1951) - Esteban - Morro Servant (uncredited)
- Too Young to Kiss (1951) - Headwaiter (uncredited)
- O. Henry's Full House (1952) - Waiter (segment "The Cop and the Anthem") (uncredited)
- The Merry Widow (1952) - Waiter (uncredited)
- Stars and Stripes Forever (1952) - Organ Grinder (uncredited)
- Call Me Madam (1953) - Music Clerk (uncredited)
- Scared Stiff (1953) - Headwaiter (uncredited)
- The Juggler (1953) - Official (uncredited)
- Remains to Be Seen (1953) - Waiter (uncredited)
- Houdini (1953) - Prof. Allegari (uncredited) (final film role)
