= Pension Schöller =

Pension Schöller may refer to:

- Pension Schöller (play), an 1890 German play by Wilhelm Jacoby and Carl Laufs
- Pension Schöller (1930 film), directed by George Jacoby
- Pension Schöller (1952 film), a remake by Jacoby
- Pension Schöller (1960 film), a second remake by Jacoby
