= 1890 in literature =

This article contains information about the literary events and publications of 1890.

== Events ==
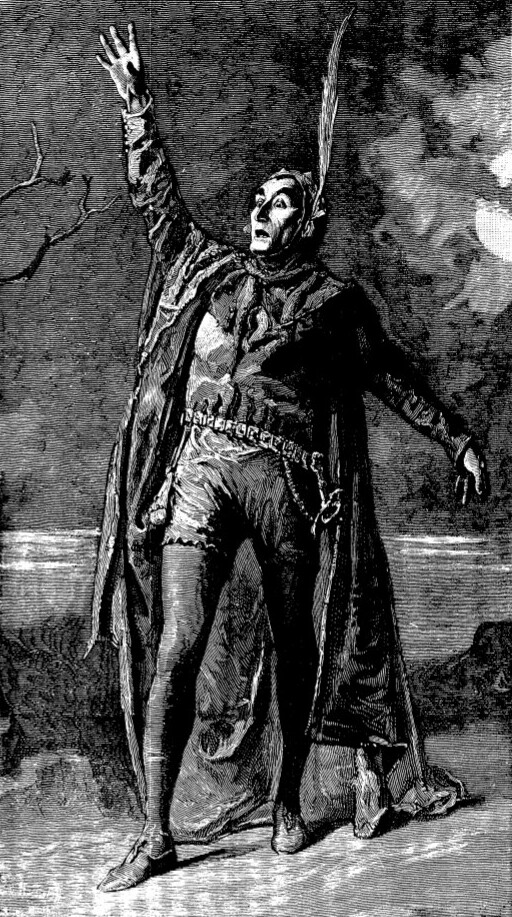
Henry Irving is widely considered to have inspired Dracula.

- January – William Heinemann launches his Heinemann publishing business in London's Covent Garden with Hall Caine's successful novel The Bondman.
- January 25 – L. Frank Baum begins publishing and editing his newspaper The Aberdeen Saturday Pioneer in Aberdeen, South Dakota; it survives for just over a year.
- March 8 – Bram Stoker begins work on Dracula.
- c. June–September – Joseph Conrad, at this time serving as Józef Teodor Konrad Korzeniowski with a Belgian steamer company, makes a journey on the Congo River which will inspire his novel Heart of Darkness (1899).
- July 13 – Ambrose Bierce's short story "An Occurrence at Owl Creek Bridge", one of his best known works, is first published, in The San Francisco Examiner.
- July–August – Bram Stoker holidays with his family at Whitby on the north-east coast of England and from the library there reads William Wilkinson's An Account of the Principalities of Wallachia and Moldavia, all of which feed into his composition of Dracula.
- September – Arthur Morrison joins the staff of The Globe (London newspaper).
- October 20 – A day after the death of Richard Francis Burton in Trieste, his widow, Isabel, burns his journals, a revised translation of The Perfumed Garden and many more manuscripts and books, largely on account of their erotic nature.
- unknown dates
  - Leo Tolstoy's novella The Kreutzer Sonata, suppressed in Russia, is published in Berlin in Russian, German, English and French, with other English versions issued in the UK and the United States. The United States Post Office Department prohibits mailing of newspapers containing serialized installments of it.
  - Macmillan Publishers in the U.K. begin to supply on "net book" terms, i.e. no discounts are available to retail consumers.
  - Hall Caine's four-act historical drama Mahomet, based on the life of Muhammad and written for the actor-manager Henry Irving, is banned by the Lord Chamberlain after it causes unrest in Britain's Muslim communities, threatens British rule in parts of India and strains Britain's relations with the Ottoman Empire.

== New books ==
=== Fiction ===
- Rolf Boldrewood – The Squatter's Dream
- Mary Elizabeth Braddon – One Life, One Love
- Rhoda Broughton – Alas!
- Hall Caine
  - The Bondman
  - The Prophet: a Parable (novella)
- Kate Chopin – At Fault
- Wilkie Collins (completed after his death in 1889 by Walter Besant) – Blind Love
- Marie Corelli – Wormwood
- Louis Couperus – Footsteps of Fate (Noodlot – Fate – in the magazine De Gids, dated October)
- Jane Dieulafoy – Parysatis
- Florence Dixie – Gloriana, or the Revolution of 1900
- Ignatius L. Donnelly – Caesar's Column
- Arthur Conan Doyle
  - The Firm of Girdlestone
  - The Sign of Four (Sherlock Holmes book-length story originally published as The Sign of the Four in Lippincott's Monthly Magazine dated February)
- Lanoe Falconer – Mademoiselle Ixe
- Knut Hamsun – Hunger (Sult)
- E. W. Hornung – A Bride from the Bush
- Rudyard Kipling – The Light That Failed (in Lippincott's Monthly Magazine dated January 1891)
- Arthur Machen – The Great God Pan (in the magazine The Whirlwind)
- Karl May – Der Schatz im Silbersee (The Treasure of Silver Lake, begins publication)
- Mori Ōgai – "The Dancing Girl" (舞姫, Maihime, short story in Kokumin no Tomo)
- William Morris – News from Nowhere (serialized in Commonweal)
- Octave Mirbeau – Sébastien Roch
- Georges Ohnet - Serge Panine
- Bolesław Prus
  - The Doll (Lalka; book publication)
  - The New Woman (Emancypantki; serialization begins)
- Molly Elliot Seawell – Little Jarvis
- Mary Taylor – Miss Miles, or, A Tale of Yorkshire Life Sixty Years Ago
- Jules Verne – César Cascabel
- Oscar Wilde – The Picture of Dorian Gray (in Lippincott's Monthly Magazine dated July)

=== Children and young people ===
- Lady Florence Dixie
  - Aniwee, or, The Warrior Queen
  - The Young Castaways, or, The Child Hunters of Patagonia
- Joseph Jacobs – English Fairy Tales
- Kate Douglas Wiggin – Timothy's Quest
- Dikken Zwilgmeyer (as Inger Johanne) – Vi børn (We Children)

=== Drama ===
- Hall Caine – Good Old Times
- Clyde Fitch – Beau Brummell
- James Herne – Margaret Fleming
- 'Bjarne P. Holmsen' (Arno Holz and Johannes Schlaf) – Die Familie Selicke
- Wilhelm Jacoby and Carl Laufs – Pension Schöller
- Maurice Maeterlinck – The Blind (Les aveugles)
- Arthur Wing Pinero – The Cabinet Minister
- William Ranney Wilson – The Inspector

=== Poetry ===
- Edwin James Brady – The Way of Many Rivers
- Emily Dickinson (died 1886) – Poems
- W. B. Yeats – "Lake Isle of Innisfree" (in The National Observer (London) 13 December)

=== Non-fiction ===
- Eliza Brightwen – Wild Nature Won by Kindness
- Sir James George Frazer – The Golden Bough
- Clarissa Caldwell Lathrop – A Secret Institution
- Alfred Thayer Mahan – The Influence of Sea Power upon History
- Ragnar Redbeard (perhaps Arthur Desmond) – Might Is Right, or The Survival of the Fittest
- James McNeill Whistler – The Gentle Art of Making Enemies

== Births ==
- January 9
  - Karel Čapek, Czech author (died 1938)
  - Barbara Euphan Todd, English children's writer (died 1976)
  - Kurt Tucholsky, German writer and journalist (died 1935)
- January 11 – Oswald de Andrade, Brazilian poet and polemicist (died 1954)
- February 10 – Boris Pasternak, Russian author (died 1960)
- March 11 – Vannevar Bush, American author (died 1974)
- April 26 – Mykola Zerov, Ukrainian poet, translator, classical and literary scholar and critic (shot with many other Ukrainian intellectuals at Sandarmokh 1937)
- May 15 – Katherine Anne Porter, American journalist and novelist (died 1980)
- May 18 – Zora Cross, Australian poet and novelist (died 1964)
- May 20 – Allan Nevins, American historian and journalist (died 1971)
- May 29
  - Rhoda Power, English children's writer and broadcaster (died 1957)
  - Martin Wickramasinghe, Sri Lankan novelist (died 1976)
- May 31 – Gheorghe Eminescu, Romanian historian and memoirist (died 1988)
- August 15 – Tsugi Takano (鷹野 つぎ), Japanese novelist (died 1943)
- August 20 – H. P. Lovecraft, American horror writer (died 1937)
- August 24 – Jean Rhys, Dominica, West Indies-born English novelist (died 1979)
- August 28 – Ivor Gurney, English war poet and composer (died 1937)
- August 31 (August 19 O.S.) – August Alle, Estonian writer (died 1952)
- September 6 – Brinsley MacNamara, born John Weldon, Irish novelist and playwright (died 1963)
- September 10 – Franz Werfel, Austrian author (died 1945)
- September 15 – Agatha Christie, English mystery writer (died 1976)
- September 24 – A. P. Herbert, English humorist and novelist (died 1971)
- October 1 – Blanche Oelrichs, American poet and playwright (died 1950)
- October 13 – Conrad Richter, American novelist (died 1968)
- November 2 – Moa Martinson, Swedish author (died 1964)
- November 25 – Isaac Rosenberg, English poet (killed in action 1918)
- December 2 – Károly Molter, Hungarian novelist, dramatist and academic (died 1981)

== Deaths ==
- January 2 – George Henry Boker, American poet and playwright (born 1823)
- June 11 – George Edward Brett, American publisher (born 1829)
- June 24 – Subba Row, Hindu Theosophist writer (cutaneous disease, born 1856)
- July 15 – Gottfried Keller, Swiss novelist (born 1819)
- July 18 – Lydia Becker, English journalist and author, co-founder of the Women's Suffrage Journal (born 1827)
- August 9 – Eduard von Bauernfeld, Austrian dramatist (born 1802)
- August 22 – Vasile Alecsandri, Romanian patriot, poet, dramatist, politician and diplomat (born 1821)
- September 18 – Dion Boucicault, Irish dramatist (born c. 1820)
- October 19 – Sir Richard Francis Burton, English explorer, translator and writer (born 1821)
- October 26 – Carlo Collodi, Italian children's writer (born 1826)
- November 1 – Júlio Ribeiro, Brazilian naturalist, novelist and grammarian (tuberculosis, born 1845)
- December 6 – Richard William Church, English biographer and cleric (born 1815)
- December 18 – Grigory Danilevsky, Russian historical novelist (born 1829)
- December 19 – Zénaïde Fleuriot, French novelist (born 1829)
- December 29 – Octave Feuillet, French novelist and dramatist (born 1821)

== Awards ==
- Newdigate prize – Laurence Binyon
