= Burgfestspiele Bad Vilbel =

Coordinates: 50.185005°N 8.744656°E

Burgfestspiele Bad Vilbel is a theatre festival in Bad Vilbel Germany. The Burgfestspiele Bad Vilbel founded in 1987 performing from June to September in the historic scenery of the water castle Bad Vilbel. Beside own theatre productions, musicals, an own child program and smaller theatre productions in the cellar, the program of the open-air theater is completed by guest performances.

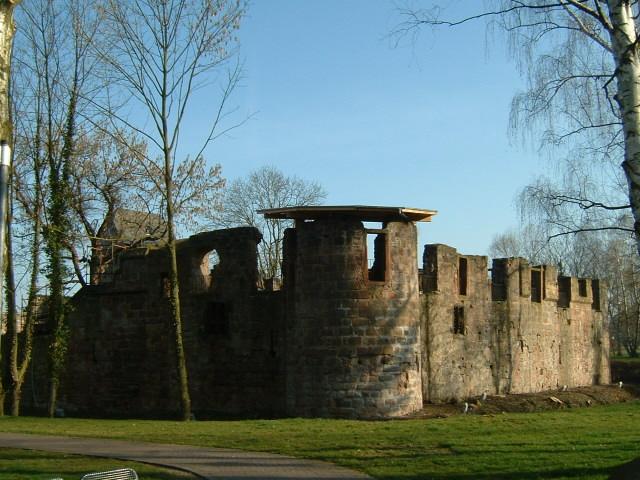
water castle Bad Vilbel

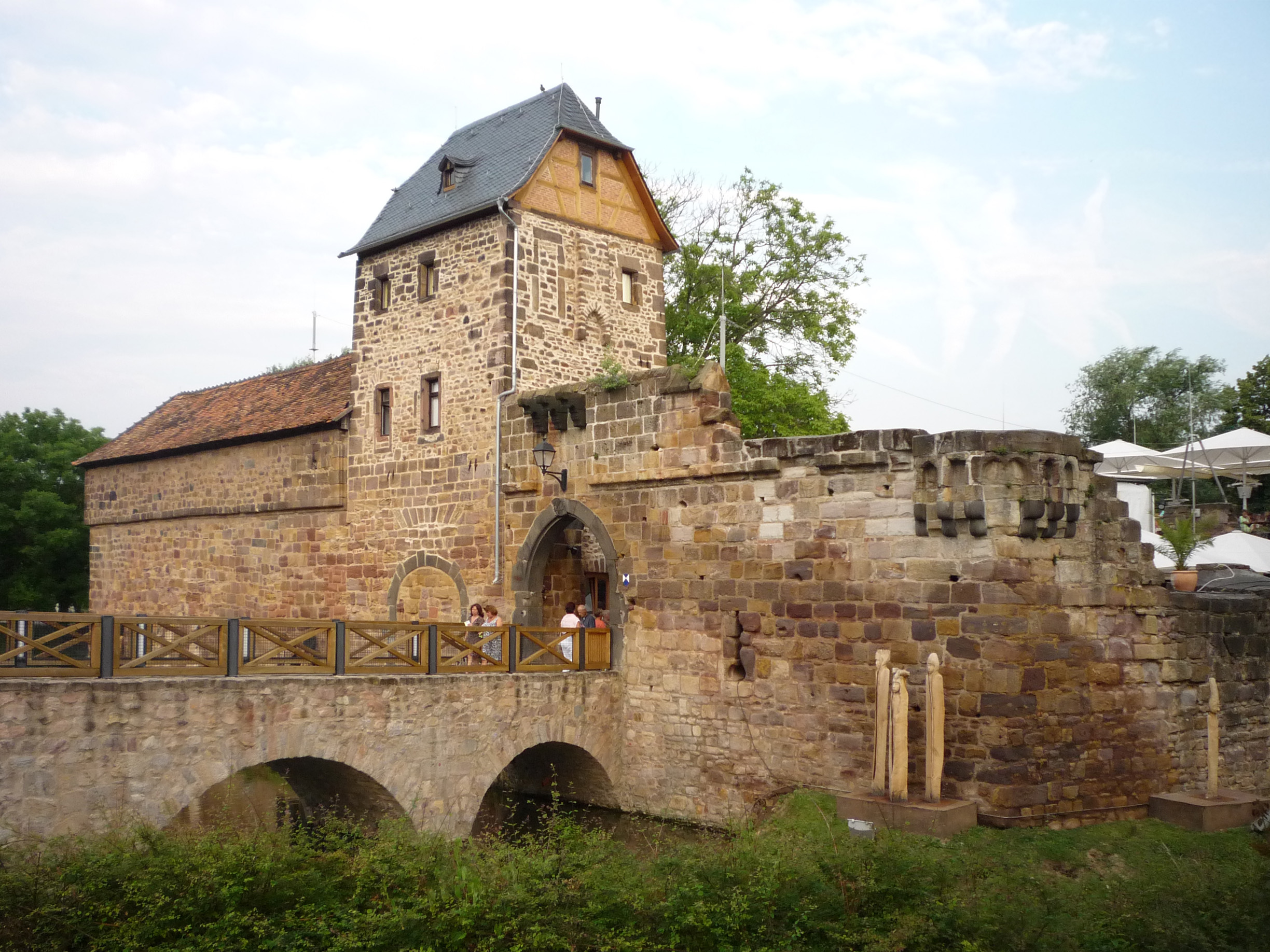
remains of the castle

== The water castle ==
In the centre of Bad Vilbel, in the northern part of the spa gardens, the remains of a moated castle stand in an idyllic location on the banks of the Nidda. It was once the residence of the Knights of Vilbel, and from 1581 to 1796 it served as the official seat of the Mainz administration. Its oldest parts date back to the 12th century. After its destruction in 1399, it was rebuilt and enlarged; since its second destruction in 1796, it has remained a ruin. Noteworthy features include the surrounding moat, the gate with its coat of arms, a Baroque fountain in the courtyard and the large great hall above a long, deep cellar, which is now a theatre cellar with around 90 seats. During the castle festival, the castle courtyard, with its largely covered stands, offers seating for around 730 spectators per performance.

== The festival grounds ==
Since 1993, the tithe barn, a historic half-timbered building, has been used for the castle festival. It houses the workshops (carpentry, tailoring and electrical workshop). Due to the positive development of the castle festival, the town of Bad Vilbel has invested considerable financial resources in redesigning and expanding the space between the castle – the venue – and the tithe barn. This has created a harmonious connection between the two buildings and a dedicated festival site in a historic setting.

Since 2016, the historic town house in Bad Vilbel – also part of the festival grounds – has been the headquarters of the management and administration of the castle festival. The programme design and implementation as well as all administrative tasks of the castle festival are carried out by the town's culture department.

== How it all began ==
The idea for an open-air theatre in the ruins of Bad Vilbel’s moated castle emerged in 1986, initiated by Bodo Preck and Mayor Günther Biwer. The first Castle Festival was held in 1987, featuring Scampolo from Dario Niccodemi. Its success led to the event becoming annual.

Initially, only one in-house production was staged per year, but by 1990 the programme expanded to include children’s theatre, literary matinees, and guest performances, including Schlossfestspiele Ettlingen. Artistic direction shifted from Klaus Havenstein (1990) to Jörg Reichlin (1993–1998).

Guest performances began touring in 1994, and since 1995, the Burgkeller has served as an additional venue.

== The Burgfestspiele today ==
Since 1999, the Cultural Department of the City of Bad Vilbel, led by Claus Kunzmann, has overseen the artistic direction of the Burgfestspiele Bad Vilbel. The programme expanded in 2000 to include productions on both the main stage and in the theatre cellar. Today, the festival offers around ten productions per season, with annual attendance rising from 5,000 to over 100,000, making it a top open air theatre festival location in Germany.

The repertoire includes classics, modern plays, Shakespearean works, and since 2003, musicals such as Evita. Opera was added in 2011, beginning with The Magic Flute for Children. Theatre for children and families has also become a major focus, supported by educational programming.

== List of productions for 2020 ==
- Barrelhouse Jazz Band (Germany’s most successful ensemble for Classic Jazz and Swing)
- Mondlicht und Magnolien (Comedy by Hollywood producer David O. Selznick)
- Ladies Night - Ganz oder gar nicht (Theatre play with dance performances)

== List of productions for 2019 ==
- Aschenputtel (Opera for all from age of 5, according Gioacchino Rossini),
- 1984 (by George Orwell, version by Alan Lyddiard, German translation Michael Raab),
- Frau Müller muss weg (by Lutz Hübner and Sarah Nemitz),
- Pippi auf den sieben Meeren (Play for visitors from age of 5, according Astrid Lindgren),
- Emil und die Detektive (Musical for all from age of 5, according Erich Kästner),
- Pension Schöller (Droll story from Wilhelm Jacoby and Carl Laufs, version Jürgen Wölffer,
- Saturday Night Fever (Musical from Robert Stigwood and Bill Oakes, version Ryan McBryde, music The Bee Gees, German dialogs Anja Hauptmann,
- Shakespeare In Love (according to the script from Marc Norman and Tom Stoppard, stage adaption Lee Hall, music PaddyCunneen, German by Corinna Brocher,
- Der dressierte Mann (Comedy by John von Düffel according Esther Vilar)
