= Flood myth =

Myth in which a great flood destroys civilization

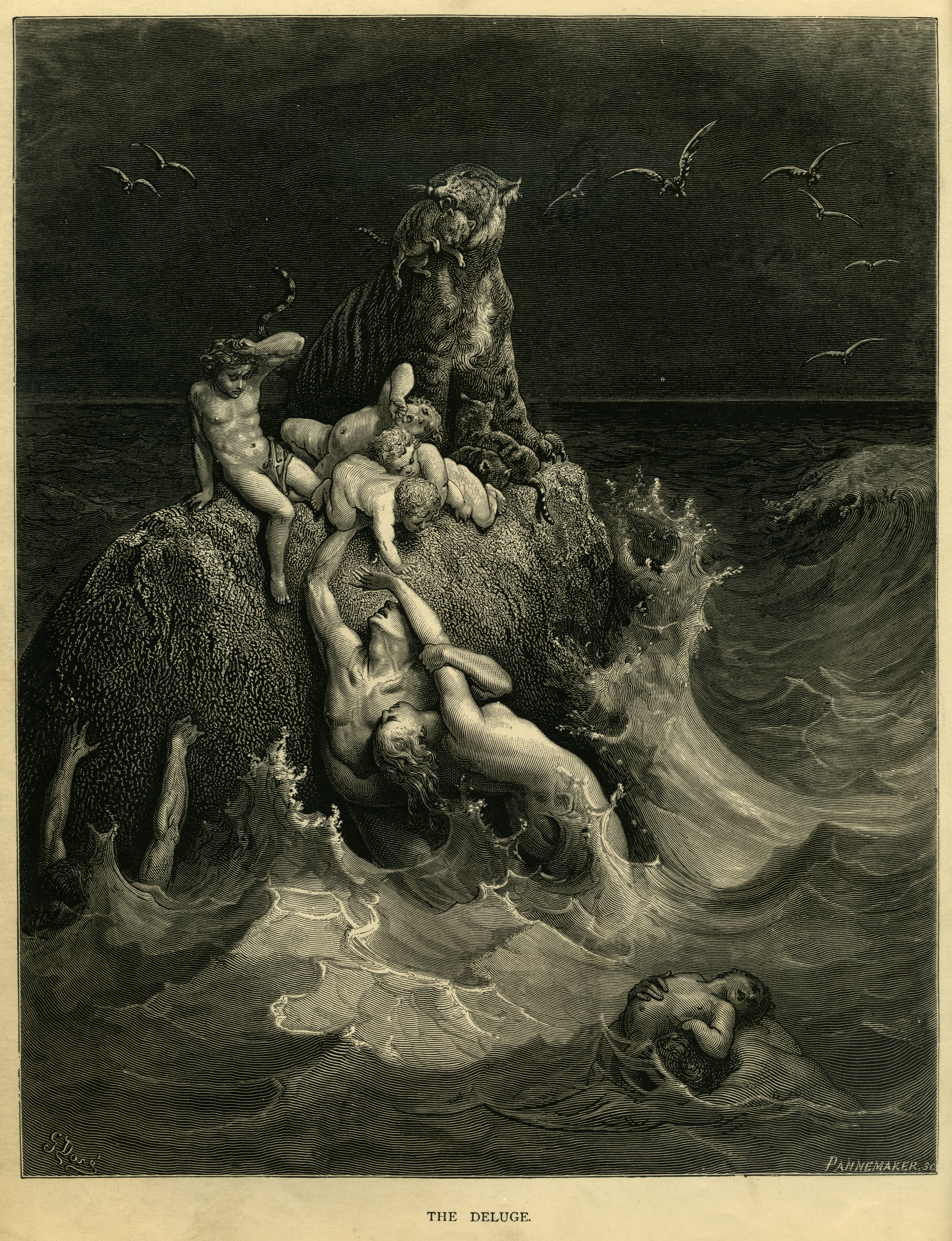
"The Deluge", frontispiece to Gustave Doré's illustrated edition of the Bible

A flood myth or a deluge myth is a narrative in which a great flood—usually sent by one or more deities—destroys civilization, typically as an act of divine retribution. Parallels are often drawn between the floodwaters of these myths and the primordial cosmic ocean that appears in certain creation myths, because the floodwaters are described as a means of social cleansing or purifying humanity of its corruption, for example, in preparation for rebirth. Most flood myths also feature a culture hero who "represents the human craving for life".

The oldest known narrative of a divinely initiated flood originates from the Sumerian culture in Mesopotamia, among others expressed in the Akkadian Atra-Hasis epic, which dates to the 18th century BCE. Comparable flood narratives appear in many other cultures, including the biblical Genesis flood narrative, manvantara-sandhya in Hinduism, Deucalion in Greek mythology, and in Indigenous North American cultures.

== Mythologies ==
=== Ancient Near East ===
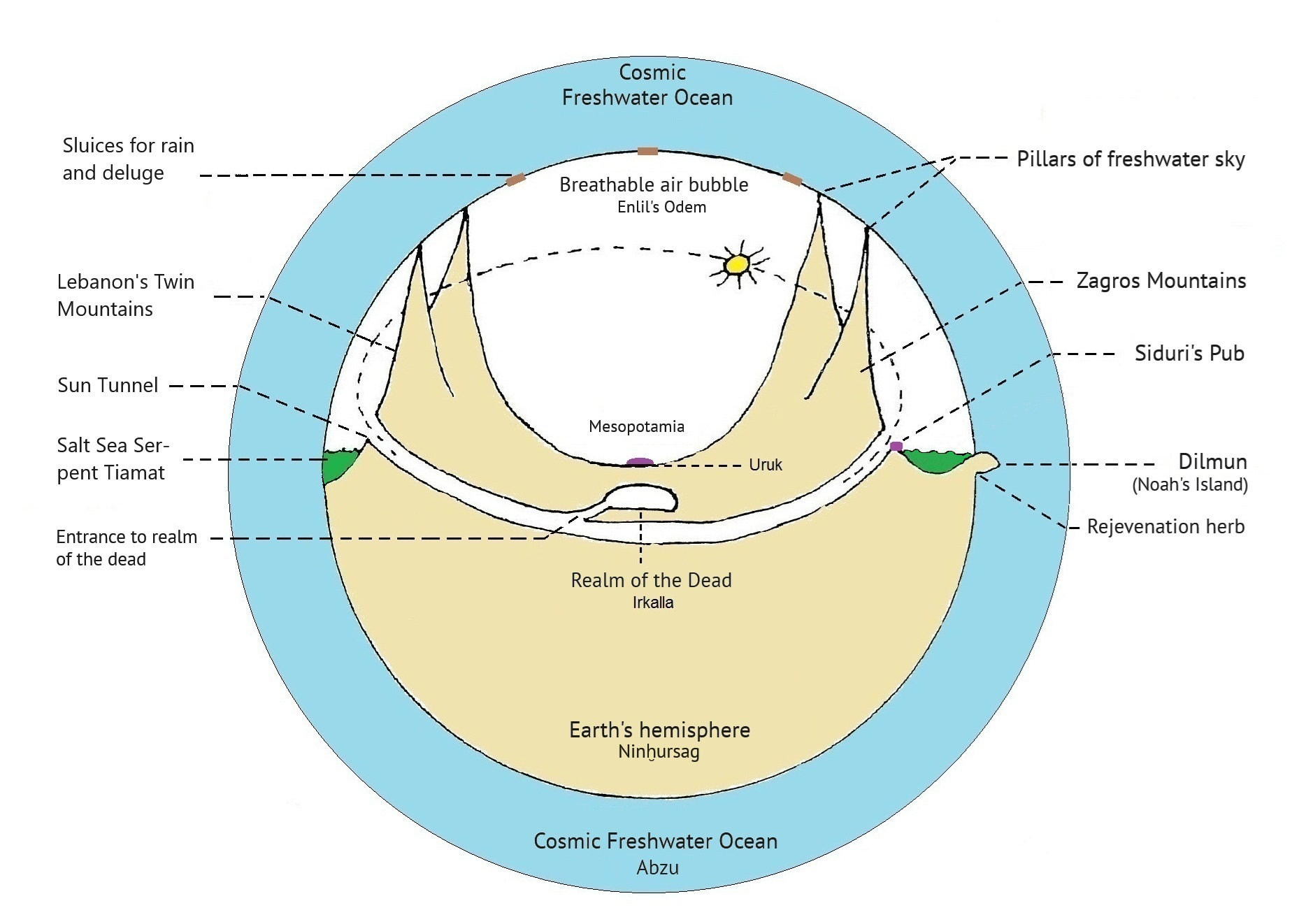
The Sumerian Genesis describes the Abzu as a cosmic freshwater ocean that surrounds our planet (created in its midst) above and below, so the sketch shows the same as Babylon's map, now in sideview. A bubble of breathable air clings to Earth, with the Abzu's boundary layer as a roof like on Athrahasis-Noah's lifeboat. Further details, such as Noah’s island Dilmun and the tunnel (through it, the sun god Shamash traveled dry-footed from west to east during night), are taken from the Epic of Gilgamesh. An important technical detail are also the sluices built into sky. Through them, the gods, skilled in construction of irrigation systems, supplied their Garden of Eden with rain, but also unleashed the Flood.

The Epic of Gilgamesh (c. 2100–1800 BCE) tells the story of a massive flood from which only a single human family survives – a narrative that, according to current research, was largely borrowed from the Atra-Hasis epic. (Note: Andrew R. George points out that the modern version of the Epic of Gilgamesh was compiled by Sîn-lēqi-unninni, who lived sometime between 1300 and 1000 BCE.) In it, a cross-group organisation of Sumerian gods begins to transform Mesopotamian's steppe 'Eden' into a fertile garden landscape, introducing agriculture on Earth, which is one of the hallmarks of the Neolithic Revolution. The hard labour provokes a revolt among the 'lower' gods. To end this strife, first humans were created in pairs to do the work in place of the gods and to reproduce themself. After a few thousand years, however, humans have multiplied to such an extent that they disturb the 'upper gods' with their noise, so Enlil, the highest of all gods, decides to unleash a mighty flood to wipe out humanity. The rebellious god Enki secretly warns his priest Atrahasis of the impending catastrophe. Giving him detailed instructions for building a boat, the Atrahasis-family survive, ensuring the continued existence of humanity.

The similar Eridu Genesis (c. 1600 BCE), known from tablets found in the ruins of Nippur in the late 1890s, was translated by assyriologist Arno Poebel.

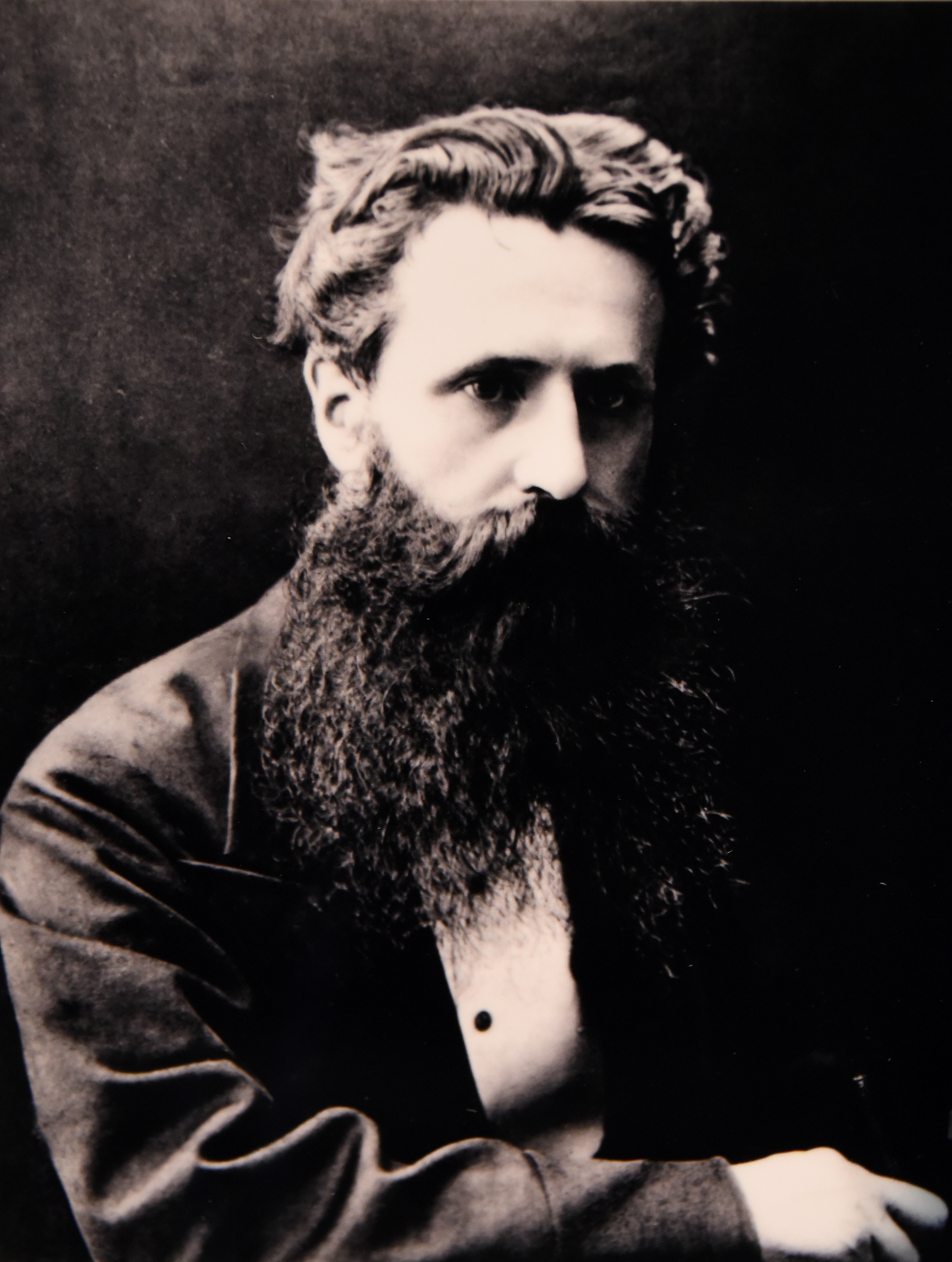
George Smith, who discovered and translated the Epic of Gilgamesh

Academic Yi Samuel Chen analyzed various texts from the Early Dynastic III Period through to the Old Babylonian Period, and argues that the flood narrative was only added in texts written during the Old Babylonian Period. With regard to the Sumerian King List, expert observations have consistently indicated that the portion of the Sumerian King List discussing events before the flood differs stylistically from the King List Proper. Old Babylonian copies tend to represent a tradition of 'before the flood' apart from the actual King List, whereas the Ur III copy of the King List and the duplicate from the Brockmon collection indicate that the King List Proper once existed independent of mention of the flood and the tradition of before the flood. Chen provides evidence that the section preceding the flood and the flood references in the Sumerian King List were later additions from the Old Babylonian Period, as the Sumerian King List underwent updates and edits. The flood as a watershed in the early history of the world was probably a new historiographical concept emerging in the Mesopotamian literary traditions during the Old Babylonian Period, as evident by the fact that the flood motif did not show up in the Ur III copy and that earliest chronographical sources related to the flood show up in the Old Babylonian Period. Chen also concludes that the name of Ziusudra as a flood hero and the idea of the flood hinted at by that name in the Old Babylonian Version of "Instructions of Shuruppak" are only developments during that Old Babylonian Period, when also the didactic text was updated with information from the burgeoning Antediluvian Tradition.

In the Genesis flood narrative in the Hebrew Bible (9th century BCE or 5th century BCE), the god Yahweh, who had created man out of the dust of the ground, decides to flood the earth because of the corrupted state of mankind. Yahweh then gives the protagonist, Noah, instructions to build an ark in order to preserve human and animal life. When the ark is completed, Noah, his family, and representatives of all the animals of the earth are called upon to enter the ark. When the destructive flood begins, all life outside of the ark perishes. After the waters recede, all those aboard the ark disembark and have Yahweh's promise that he will never again judge the earth with a flood. Yahweh made the rainbow the sign of this promise.

=== India and Iran ===
In Hinduism, texts such as the Shatapatha Brahmana (c. 6th century BCE) and the Puranas contain the story of a great flood, manvantara-sandhya, wherein the Matsya avatar of Vishnu warns the first man, Manu, of the impending flood, and also advises him to build a giant boat. In Zoroastrianism, Ahriman tries to destroy the world with a drought that Mithra ends by shooting an arrow into a rock from which a flood springs; one man survives in an ark with his cattle. German academic Norbert Oettinger argues that the story of Yima and the Vara was originally a flood myth, and the harsh winter was added in due to the dry nature of Eastern Iran, as flood myths did not have as much of an effect as harsh winters. He has argued that the mention of melted water flowing in Videvdad 2.24 is a remnant of the flood myth, and notes that Indian flood myths originally had Yama as the protagonist, but this was later changed to Manu.

=== Ancient Greece ===
In Plato's Timaeus, written c. 360 BCE, Timaeus describes a flood myth similar to the earlier versions. In it, the Bronze race of humans angers the high god Zeus with their constant warring. Zeus decides to punish humanity with a flood. The Titan Prometheus, who had created humans from clay, tells the secret plan to his son Deucalion, advising him to build an ark in order to be saved. After nine nights and days, the water starts receding, and the ark lands on a mountain.

=== North America ===
The Cheyenne, a North American Great Plains tribe, has a tradition where a flood altered the course of their history, perhaps occurring in the Missouri River Valley. The Blackfeet, another Great Plains tribe, have a story called "Language on a Mountain". In this story, the deity Napi, referred to as Old Man, recounts a great flood that swept through the land. After the flood, Old Man made the water different colours. He gathered the people on top of a large mountain, where he gave them water of different colours. Old Man then told the people to drink the water, then speak, and so they did. Everyone was speaking a different language except those who received the black water; they were speaking the same language, and they consisted of the bands of the Blackfoot, the Piegan (Apatohsipikuni and Amskapipikuni), the Siksika, and the Blood (Kainai). This was said to have taken place in the highest mountain in the Montana reservation.

The Hopi, southwestern United States, have a tradition of a flood that nearly reached the tops of the mountains, and other Puebloans have similar legends.

== Historicity ==
=== Mesopotamia ===
Mesopotamia, like other early sites of river valley civilizations, was flood-prone; and for those experiencing valley-wide inundations, flooding could destroy the whole of their known world. According to the report of the 1930s excavation at Shuruppak (modern Tell Fara, Iraq), the Jemdet Nasr and Early Dynastic layers at the site were separated by a 60 cm (24 in) yellow layer of alluvial sand and clay, indicating a flood, like that created by river avulsion, a process common in the Tigris–Euphrates river system. Similar layers have been recorded at other sites as well, all dating to different periods, which would be consistent with the nature of river avulsions. Shuruppak in Mesopotamian legend was the city of Uta-napishtim, the king who built a boat to survive the coming flood. The alluvial layer dates from around 2900 BCE.

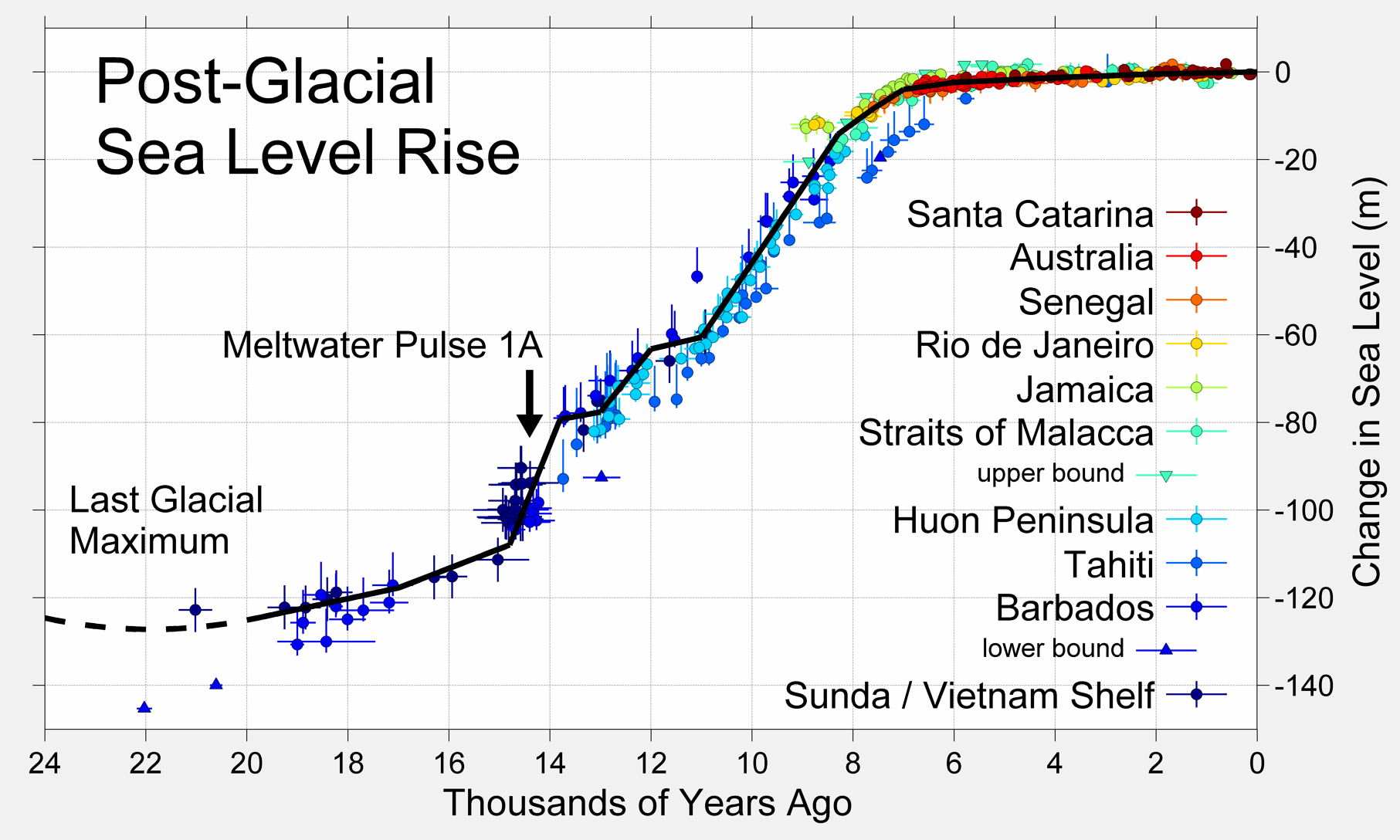
Earth's sea level rose dramatically in the millennia after the Last Glacial Maximum.

The geography of the Mesopotamian area changed considerably with the filling of the Persian Gulf as sea waters rose following the last glacial period. Global sea levels were about 120 m (390 ft) lower around 18,000 BP and rose until 8,000 BP when they reached current levels, an average of 40 m (130 ft) above the floor of the Gulf. At that time it was a huge (800 km × 200 km, 500 mi × 120 mi) low-lying and fertile region in Mesopotamia, where human habitation is thought to have been strong around the ancient Ur Schatt river for 100,000 years. A sudden increase in settlements above the present-day water level is recorded at around 7,500 BP.

=== Mediterranean Basin ===
The historian Adrienne Mayor theorizes that global flood stories may have been inspired by ancient observations of seashells and fish fossils in inland and mountain areas. The ancient Greeks, Egyptians, and Romans all documented the discovery of such remains in such locations; the Greeks hypothesized that Earth had been covered by water on several occasions, citing the seashells and fish fossils found on mountain tops as evidence of this idea.

Speculation regarding the Deucalion myth has postulated a large tsunami in the Mediterranean Sea, caused by the Thera eruption (with an approximate geological date of 1630–1600 BCE), as the myth's historical basis. Although the tsunami hit the South Aegean Sea and Crete, it did not affect cities in the mainland of Greece, such as Mycenae, Athens, and Thebes, which continued to prosper, indicating that it had a local rather than a region-wide effect.

==== Black Sea deluge hypothesis ====
The Black Sea deluge hypothesis offers a controversial account of long-term flooding; the hypothesis argues for a catastrophic irruption of water about 5600 BCE from the Mediterranean Sea into the Black Sea basin. This has become the subject of considerable discussion. The Younger Dryas impact hypothesis offered another proposed natural explanation for flood myths. However, this idea was similarly controversial and has been refuted.

=== Comets ===
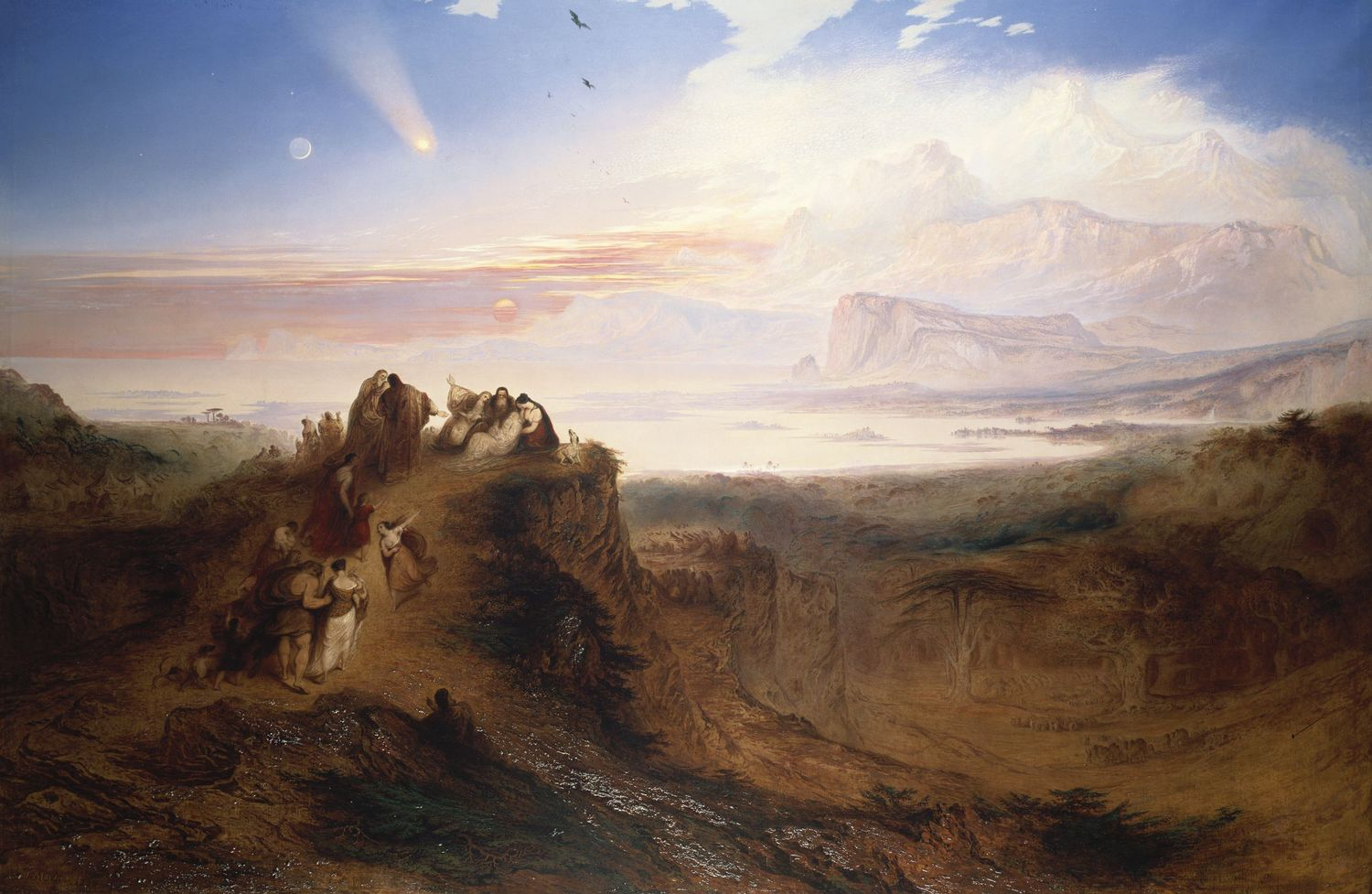
The Eve of the Deluge, by John Martin, 1840. Depicts a comet causing the Great Flood.

The earliest known hypothesis about a comet that had a widespread effect on human populations can be attributed to Edmond Halley, who in 1694 suggested that a worldwide flood had been the result of a near-miss by a comet. The issue was taken up in more detail by William Whiston, a protégé of and popularizer of the theories of Isaac Newton, who argued in his book A New Theory of the Earth (1696) that a comet encounter was the probable cause of the Biblical Flood of Noah in 2342 BCE. Whiston also attributed the origins of the atmosphere and other significant changes in the Earth to the effects of comets.

In Pierre-Simon Laplace's book Exposition du systême du monde (The System of the World), first published in 1796, he stated:

[T]he greater part of men and animals drowned in a universal deluge, or destroyed by the violence of the shock given to the terrestrial globe; whole species destroyed; all the monuments of human industry reversed: such are the disasters which a shock of a comet would produce.

A similar hypothesis was popularized by Minnesota congressman and pseudoarchaeology writer Ignatius L. Donnelly in his book Ragnarok: The Age of Fire and Gravel (1883), which followed his better-known book Atlantis: The Antediluvian World (1882). In Ragnarok, Donnelly argued that an enormous comet struck the Earth around 6,000 BCE to 9,000 BCE, (Note: In Ragnarok: The Age of Fire and Gravel (1883) Donnelly suggested that the flood of Noah "probably occurred somewhere from eight to eleven thousand years ago" (6,117 BCE to 9,117 BCE); in his previous book Atlantis: The Antediluvian World (1882) Donnelly followed Plato's timeline and gave a date of 9,600 BCE (11,550 BP) for the destruction of Atlantis.) destroying an advanced civilization on the "lost continent" of Atlantis. Donnelly, following others before him, attributed the Biblical Flood to this event, which he hypothesized had also resulted in catastrophic fires and climate change. Shortly after the publication of Ragnarok, one commenter noted, "Whiston ascertained that the deluge of Noah came from a comet's tail; but Donnelly has outdone Whiston, for he has shown that our planet has suffered not only from a cometary flood, but from cometary fire, and a cometary rain of stones."

=== Asteroid impact ===
Archaeologist Bruce Masse stated that some of the narratives of a great flood discovered in many cultures around the world may be linked to an oceanic asteroid impact that occurred between Africa and Antarctica, around the time of a solar eclipse, that caused a tsunami. Among the 175 myths he analyzed were a Hindu myth speaking of an alignment of the five planets at the time, and a Chinese myth linking the flood to the end of the reign of the chthonic goddess Nüwa. Fourteen flood myths refer to a full solar eclipse. According to Masse, these indications point to the date May 10, 2807 BCE. His hypothesis suggests that a meteor or comet crashed into the Indian Ocean around 3000–2800 BCE, and created the 18-mile (29 km) undersea Burckle Crater and Fenambosy Chevron, and generated a giant tsunami that flooded coastal lands.

=== End of the Last Glacial Period ===
Floods in the wake of the Last Glacial Period (c. 115,000 – c. 11,700 years ago) are speculated to have inspired myths that survive to this day. Plato's allegory of Atlantis is set over 9,000 years before his time, leading some scholars to suggest that a Stone Age society which lived close to the Mediterranean Sea could have been wiped out by the rising sea level, an event which could have served as the basis for the story.

== Art ==
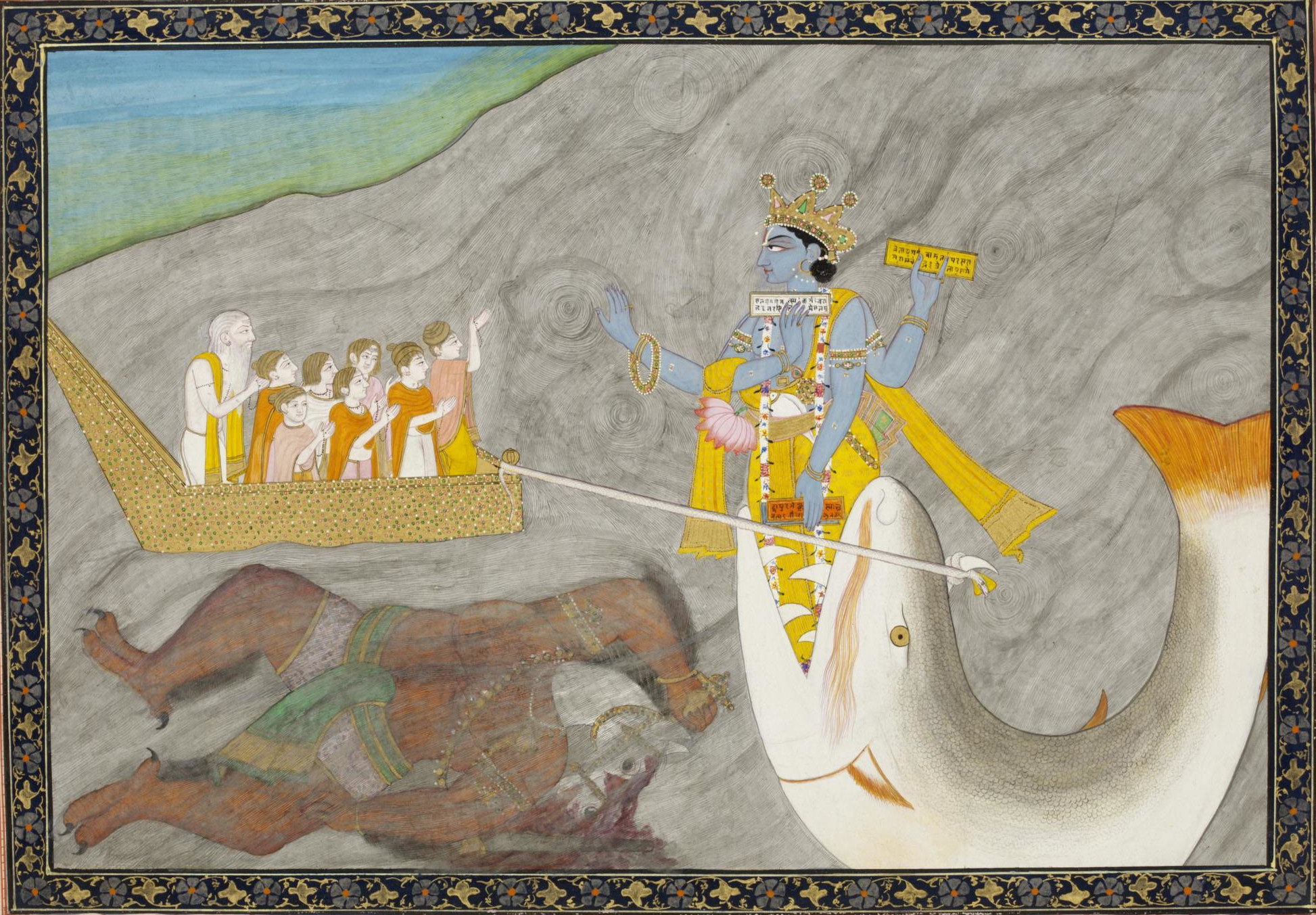
Matsya-avatara of Lord Vishnu pulls Manu's boat after having defeated the demon.

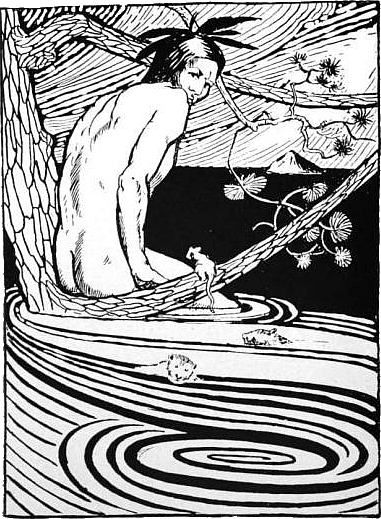
Nanabozho in Ojibwe flood story from an illustration by R. C. Armour, in his book North American Indian Fairy Tales, Folklore and Legends (1905)

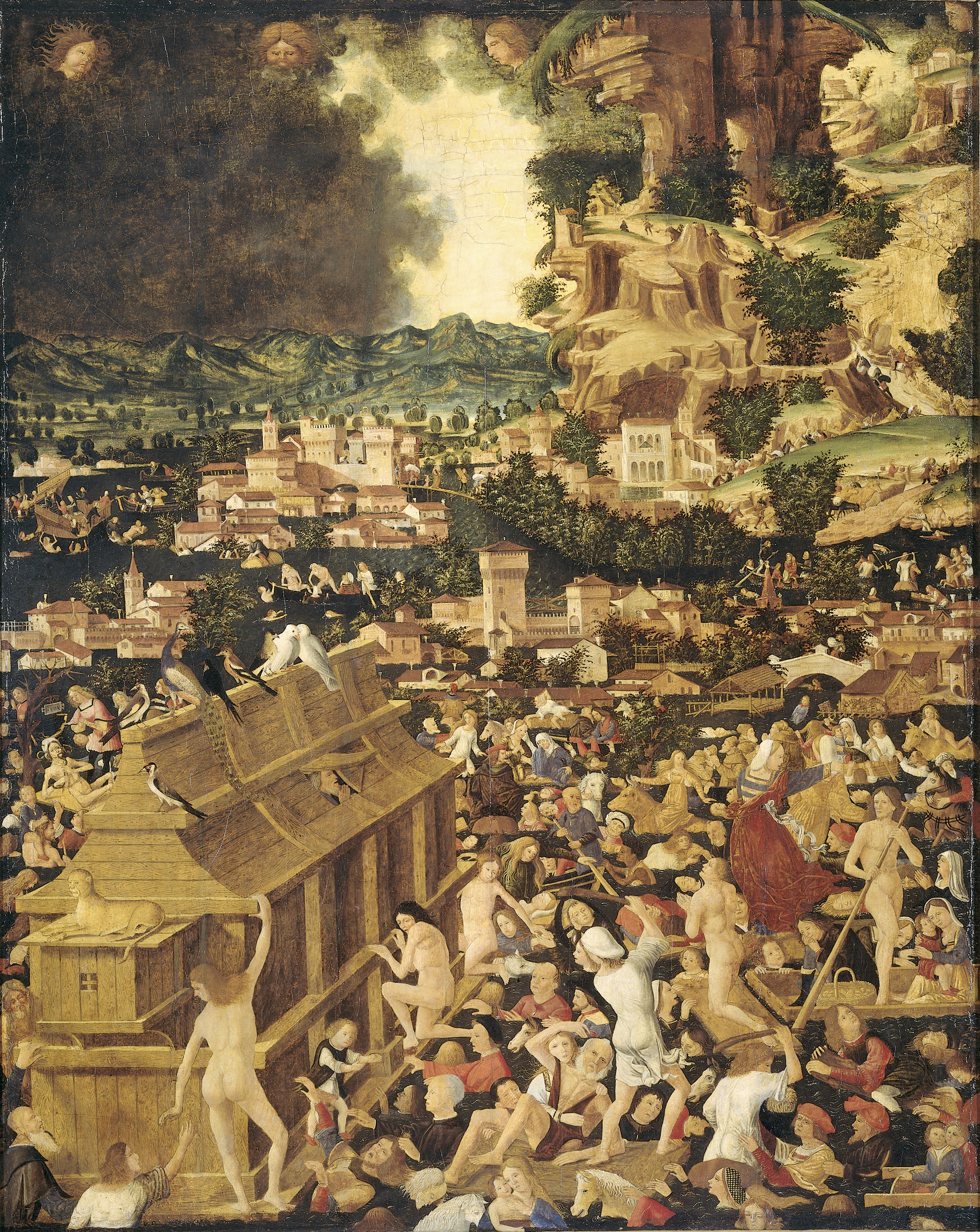
The Great Flood, by anonymous painter, The vom Rath bequest, Rijksmuseum

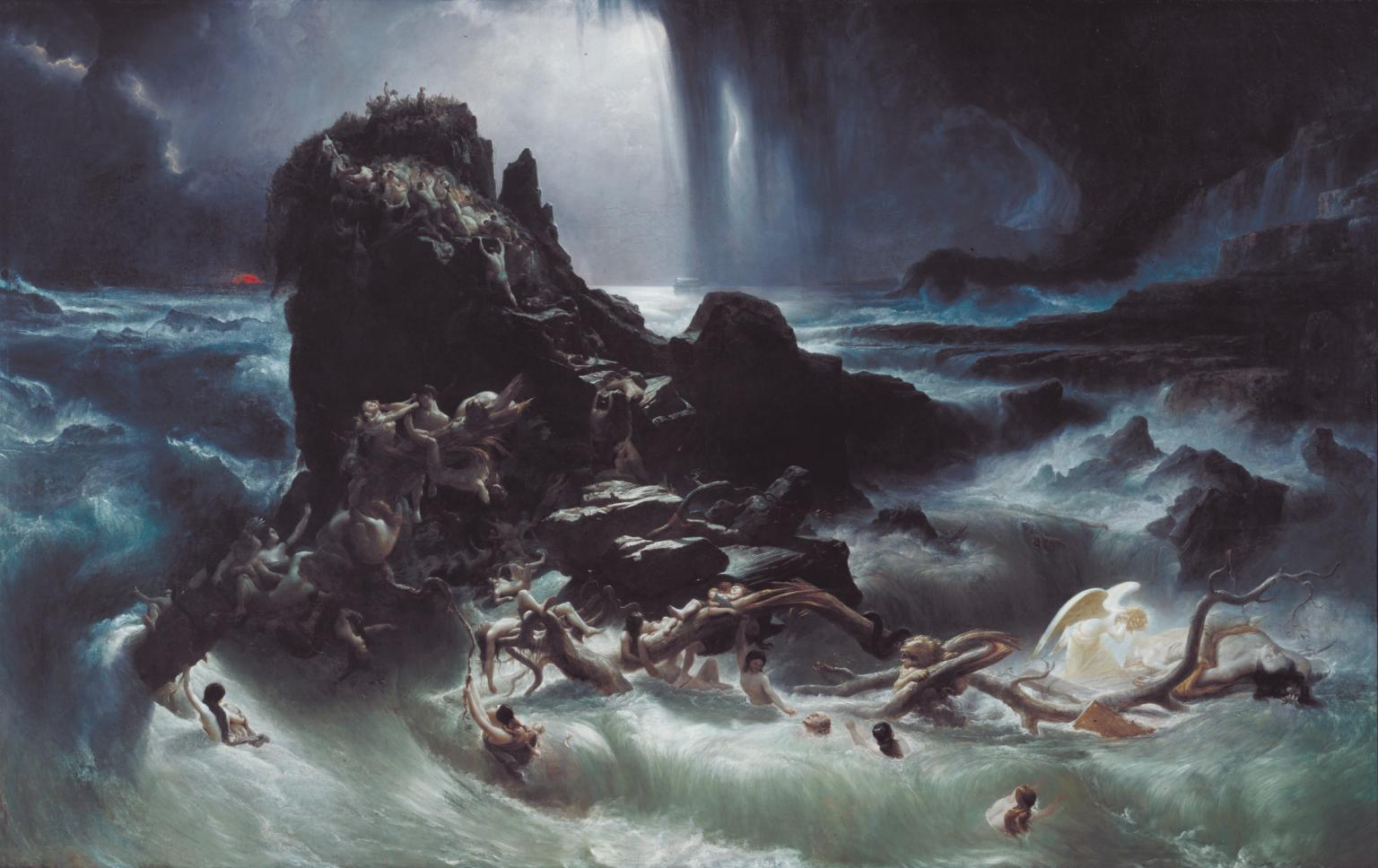
The Deluge, by Francis Danby, 1840. Oil on canvas. Tate Gallery

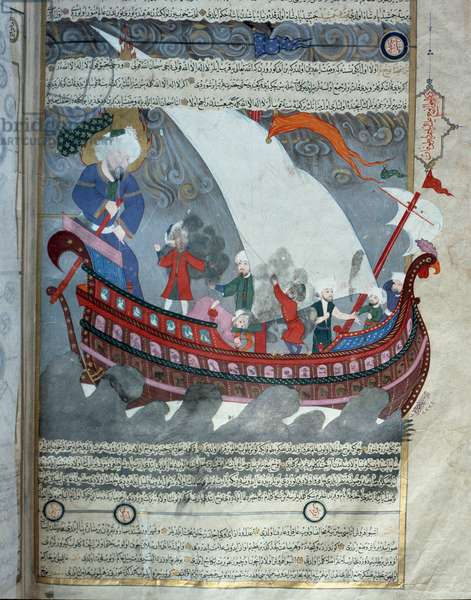
Noah's Ark from the Zubdat al-Tawarikh in the Museum of Turkish and Islamic Arts in Istanbul, dedicated to Sultan Murad III in 1583

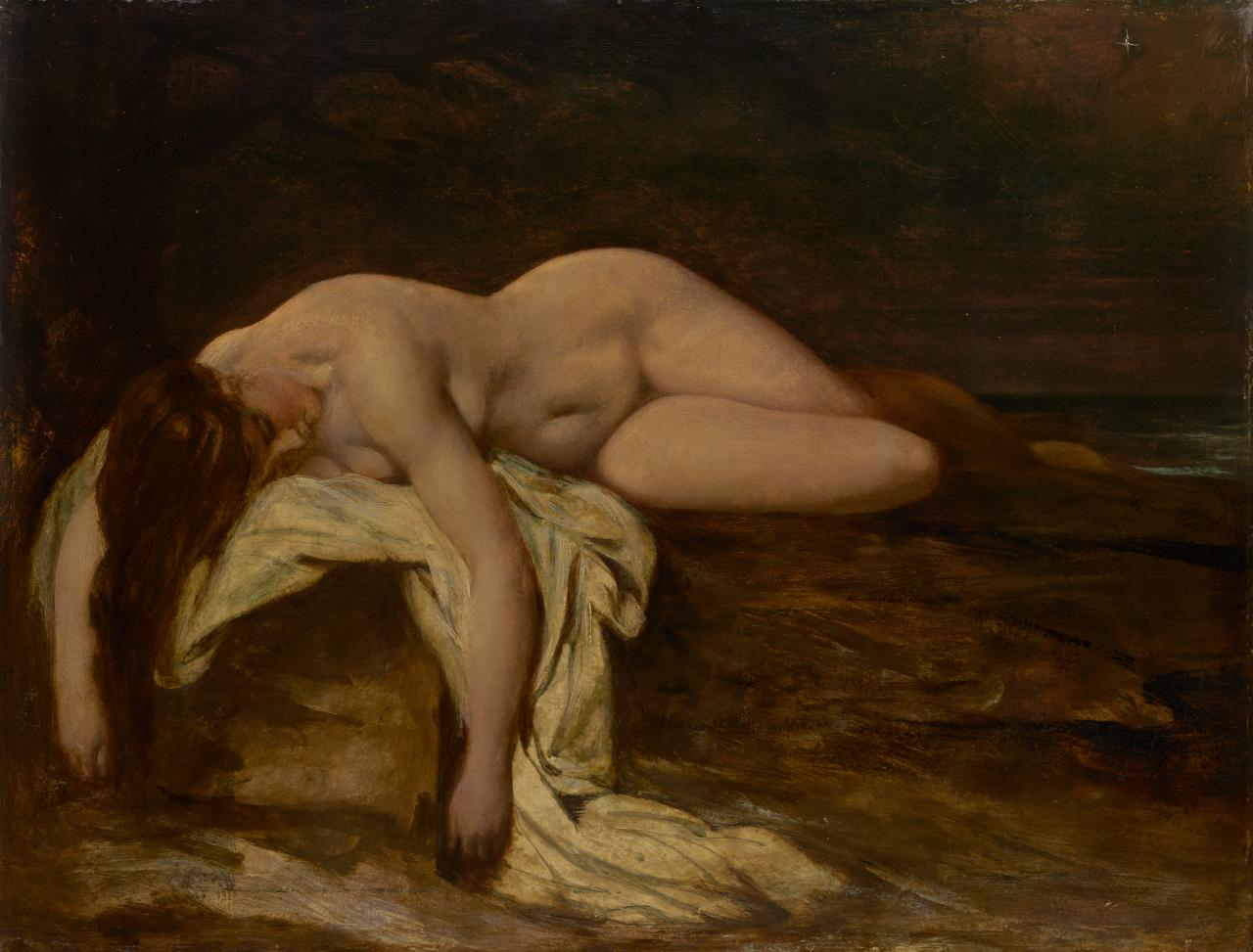
"Study for The Deluge" 1843 painting by William Etty depicting the aftermath of a mythological deluge, or, "great flood".

== See also ==
- Bølling–Allerød Interstadial
- List of flood myths
- Sea level rise
