= Pension Schöller (1952 film) =

1952 film

- Film poster
- Directed by: Georg Jacoby
- Written by: Fritz Böttger; Georg Jacoby; Bobby E. Lüthge; Joachim Wedekind
- Based on: Pension Schöller by Wilhelm Jacoby and Carl Laufs
- Produced by: Karl Julius Fritzsche; Helmuth Volmer
- Starring: Camilla Spira; Eva Ingeborg Scholz; Joachim Brennecke
- Cinematography: Bruno Mondi
- Edited by: Walter von Bonhorst
- Music by: Heino Gaze
- Production company: Magna Film
- Distributed by: Deutsche London-Film
- Release date: 10 August 1952
- Running time: 89 minutes
- Country: West Germany
- Language: German

Pension Schöller is a 1952 West German comedy film directed by Georg Jacoby and starring Camilla Spira, Eva Ingeborg Scholz and Joachim Brennecke. It was made at the Tempelhof Studios in West Berlin. The film's sets were designed by the art director Erich Kettelhut. It is an adaptation of the 1890 play Pension Schöller by Wilhelm Jacoby and Carl Laufs. Georg Jacoby was Wilhem's son, and made three film adaptation of his father's best known play in 1930, 1952 and 1960.

== Plot ==
The landowner and bachelor Philipp Klapproth, who finances his nephew Peter Klapproth's medical studies, receives a letter from him in which he asks his uncle for 20,000 marks which he wants to invest into construction of an insane asylum. The truth is, the nephew has completely different plans: He can neither see blood, nor has he ever studied medicine at all; instead, he and his music-loving friend Tommy dedicate themselves to their band with heart and soul. With the uncle's money, nothing would stand in the way of building a restaurant of his own. However, Philipp wants to examine the supposed institution before he gets the money out, and makes his way to Peter without further ado. In great need of explanation, he then follows Tommy's advice and leads his uncle to the Pension Schöller: "Peter's insane asylum". Their mystification fails. Peter suspects that something is not right.

== Cast ==
- Camilla Spira as Ulrike
- Eva Ingeborg Scholz as Ida
- Joachim Brennecke as Alfred Klapproth
- Ludwig Schmitz as Philipp Klapproth
- Rudolf Platte as Tommy Kießling
- Paul Henckels as Professor Schöller
- Fita Benkhoff as Josefine Krüger
- Edith Schollwer as Amalie
- Lisa Stammer as Frizzi
- Peter Mosbacher as Eugen Rümpel
- Rolf Kutschera as Fritz Bernhardy
- Bruno Fritz as Zarini
- Wolfgang Neuss as Ballmann
- Hans Stiebner
- Ewald Wenck
