= Pension Schöller (1930 film) =

1930 film

- Film poster
- Directed by: Georg Jacoby
- Written by: Walter Schlee; Walter Wassermann
- Based on: Pension Schöller by Wilhelm Jacoby and Carl Laufs
- Produced by: Liddy Hegewald
- Starring: Paul Henckels; Elga Brink; Jakob Tiedtke
- Cinematography: Georg Muschner; Willy Winterstein
- Music by: Werner Schmidt-Boelcke
- Production company: Hegewald Film
- Distributed by: Hegewald Film
- Release date: 21 October 1930
- Running time: 105 minutes
- Country: Germany
- Language: German

Pension Schöller is a 1930 German comedy film directed by Georg Jacoby and starring Paul Henckels, Elga Brink and Jakob Tiedtke. It is an adaptation of the 1890 play Pension Schöller by Wilhelm Jacoby and Carl Laufs. Georg Jacoby was Wilhem's son, and made three film adaptations of his father's best known play in 1930, 1952 and 1960. It was shot at the Grunewald Studios in Berlin. The film's sets were designed by the art director Max Heilbronner.

== Plot ==
Landowner and bachelor Philipp Klapproth, who is funding his nephew Peter Klapproth's medical studies, receives a letter from him asking for 20,000 marks which he wants to invest into the acquisition of a mental asylum.

In actuality, his nephew has completely different plans. Peter has an aversion to blood and has never studied medicine at all. Instead, he and his music-loving friend Tommy dedicate themselves to their band with heart and soul. Peter wants to invest the 20,000 marks into a bar with a rehearsal room.

However, his uncle wants to take a look at the asylum before dishing out the money, and soon Peter finds himself face to face with him. Unable to give his uncle a tour of a genuine asylum, he follows Tommy's advice and takes him to the Pension Schöller, a local boarding house whose guests always include some slightly eccentric people.

== Cast ==
- Paul Henckels as director Schöller
- Elga Brink as Friedel
- Jakob Tiedtke as Philipp Klapproth
- Josefine Dora as Ulrike
- Truus Van Aalten as Grete
- Paul Heidemann as Dr. Alfred Klapproth
- Kurt Vespermann as Ernst Kissling
- Else Reval as Frau Pfeiffer
- Viktor de Kowa as Bernhardy
- Fritz Kampers as Gröber
- Hedwig Wangel as Fräulein Krüger
- Fritz Schulz as Jallings
- Trude Berliner as Fiffi
- Carl Geppert as minister
