= Pension Schöller (1960 film) =

1960 film

- Directed by: Georg Jacoby
- Written by: Carl Laufs (play); Wilhelm Jacoby (play); Georg Jacoby; Joachim Wedekind
- Produced by: Walter Koppel; Gyula Trebitsch
- Starring: Theo Lingen; Christa Williams; Ann Smyrner
- Cinematography: Willy Winterstein
- Edited by: Alice Ludwig
- Music by: Martin Böttcher
- Production company: Real Film
- Distributed by: Europa-Filmverleih
- Release date: 15 July 1960
- Running time: 93 minutes
- Country: West Germany
- Language: German

Pension Schöller is a 1960 West German comedy film directed by Georg Jacoby and starring Theo Lingen, Christa Williams and Rudolf Vogel. It is an adaptation of the 1890 play Pension Schöller by Wilhelm Jacoby and Carl Laufs. Georg Jacoby was Wilhem's son, and made three film adaptation of his father's best known play in 1930, 1952 and 1960.

It was shot at the Wandsbek Studios in Hamburg. The film's sets were designed by the art directors Albrecht Becker and Herbert Kirchhoff.

== Cast ==
- Theo Lingen as Professor Schöller
- Christa Williams as Fritzi
- Rudolf Vogel as Gutsbesitzer Klapproth
- Boy Gobert as Eugen Rümpel
- Ann Smyrner as Erika
- Helmuth Lohner as Peter Klapproth
- Ilse Steppat as Amalie Schöller
- Leon Askin as Fritz Bernhardi
- Ursula Herking as Josefine Krüger
- Rainer Bertram as Tommy Kiesling
- Christa Siems as Ulrike Klapproth
- Benno Gellenbeck as Artist Zarini
- Joachim Wolff
- Henry Vahl
