= Bad Vilbel =

- Town
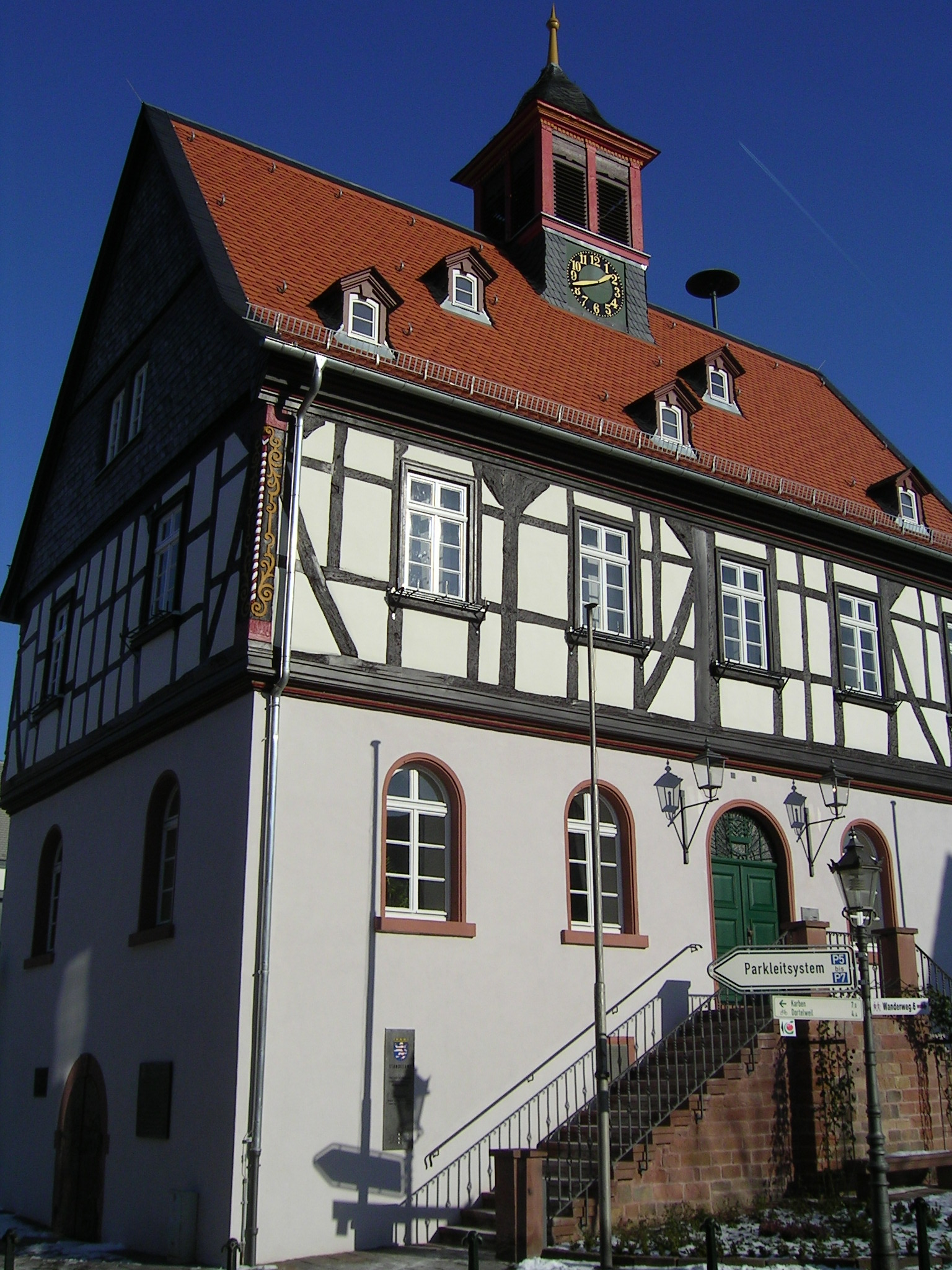
- Old town hall

- Coat of arms

- Location of Bad Vilbel within Wetteraukreis district
- Interactive map of Bad Vilbel
- Location within Germany Location within Hesse
- Coordinates: 50°10′41″N 8°44′10″E
- Country: Germany
- State: Hesse
- Admin. region: Darmstadt
- District: Wetteraukreis
- Subdivisions: 5 districts

Government
  - Mayor (2022–28): Sebastian Wysocki (CDU)

Area
  - Total: 25.68 km^{2} (9.92 sq mi)
- Elevation: 109–200 m (358–656 ft)

Population (2025-12-31)
  - Total: 35,886
  - Density: 1,397/km^{2} (3,619/sq mi)
- Time zone: UTC+01:00 (CET)
  - Summer (DST): UTC+02:00 (CEST)
- Postal codes: 61101–61118
- Dialling codes: 06101
- Vehicle registration: FB
- Website: www.bad-vilbel.de

Bad Vilbel (German pronunciation: [baːt ˈfɪlbl̩]) is a spa town in Hesse (Hessen), Germany, famous for its many mineral water springs. Bad Vilbel is the largest town in the Wetteraukreis district and part of the Frankfurt Rhein-Main urban area with its city center located 8 km northeast of downtown Frankfurt am Main at the banks of the river Nidda.

== History ==
Bad Vilbel was founded in 774 (first written document) but much older artefacts were found in the area. In 1848 during railway works, a Roman villa was unearthed with a thermae and a mosaic. A replica of this mosaic is presented in a modern exhibition in the spa gardens.

=== 20th century ===
Historical population
Year	Pop.	±%
1998	28,509	—
2000	29,716	+4.2%
2002	30,290	+1.9%
2004	30,905	+2.0%
2006	31,348	+1.4%
2008	31,456	+0.3%
2010	31,822	+1.2%
2014	32,584	+2.4%
2016	33,458	+2.7%
2017	33,745	+0.9%
As of 31 December of each year Source: HSL

The town Vilbel got the label "Bad" (spa) in 1948 for its numerous mineral springs. The health spa operations stopped in the 1960s but the mineral water industry connected more springs of the Wetterau by pipelines to the bottling plant of Hassia in Bad Vilbel. The Hessian government reform formed 1971/72 Bad Vilbel (with Heilsberg), Dortelweil, Gronau and Massenheim to the new city Bad Vilbel. Since 1997 new areas have been developed for living and business, like the residential area of Dortelweil-West or the commercial park Quellenpark between Bad Vilbel, Massenheim and Dortelweil.

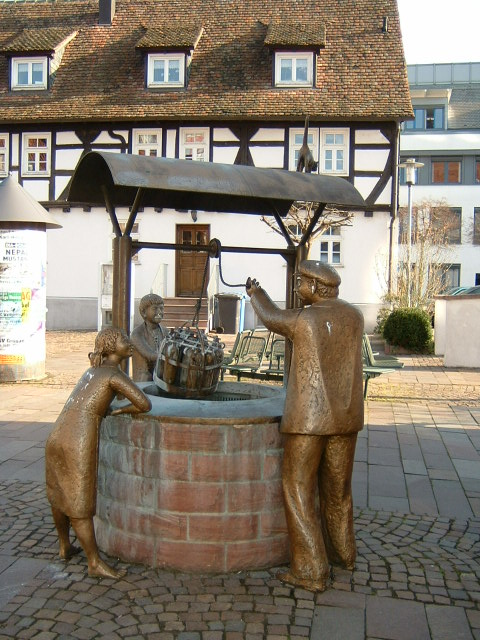
Fountain near the old townhall

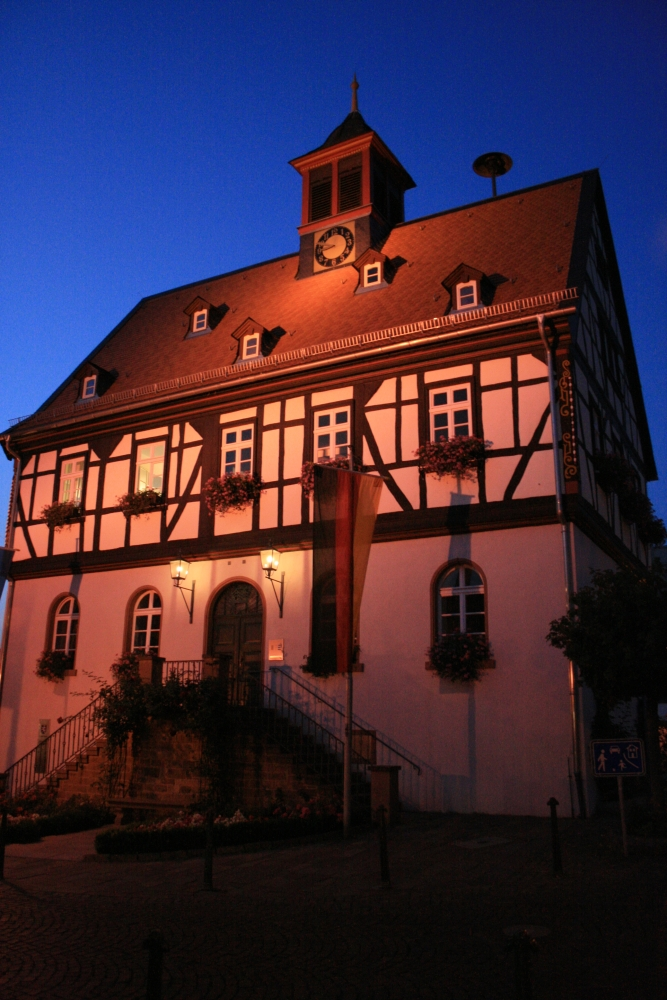
Old townhall

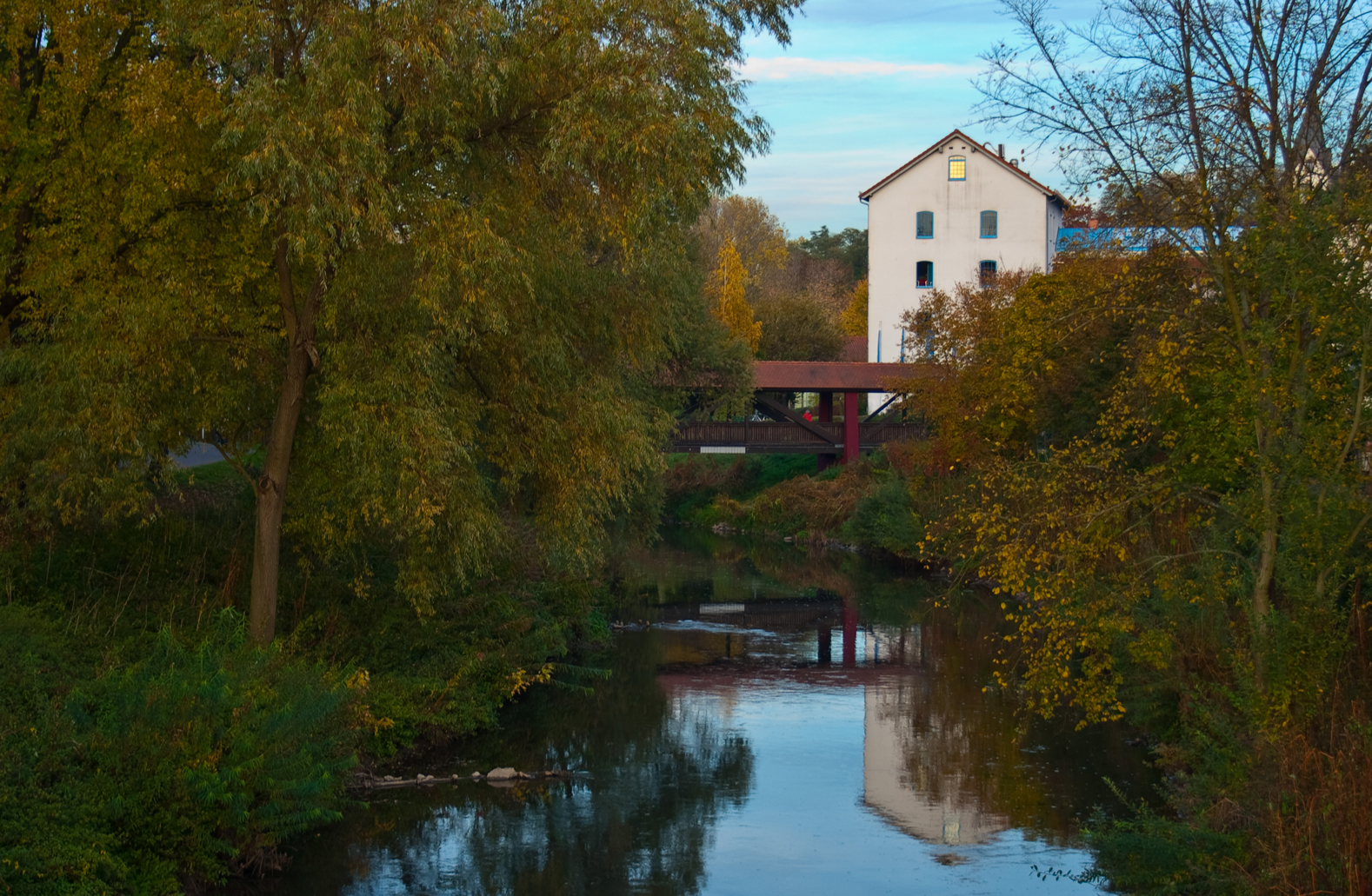
Cultural center, old mill

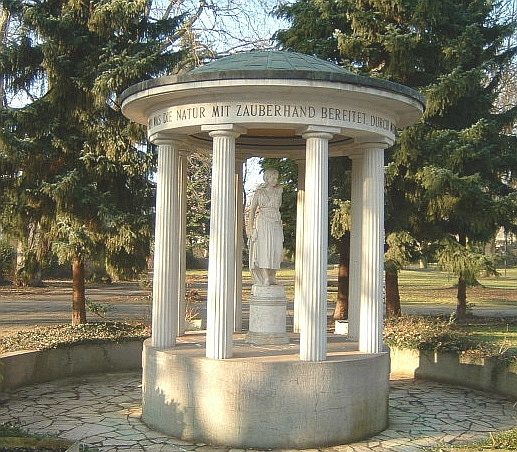
Friedrich-Karl-Sprudel

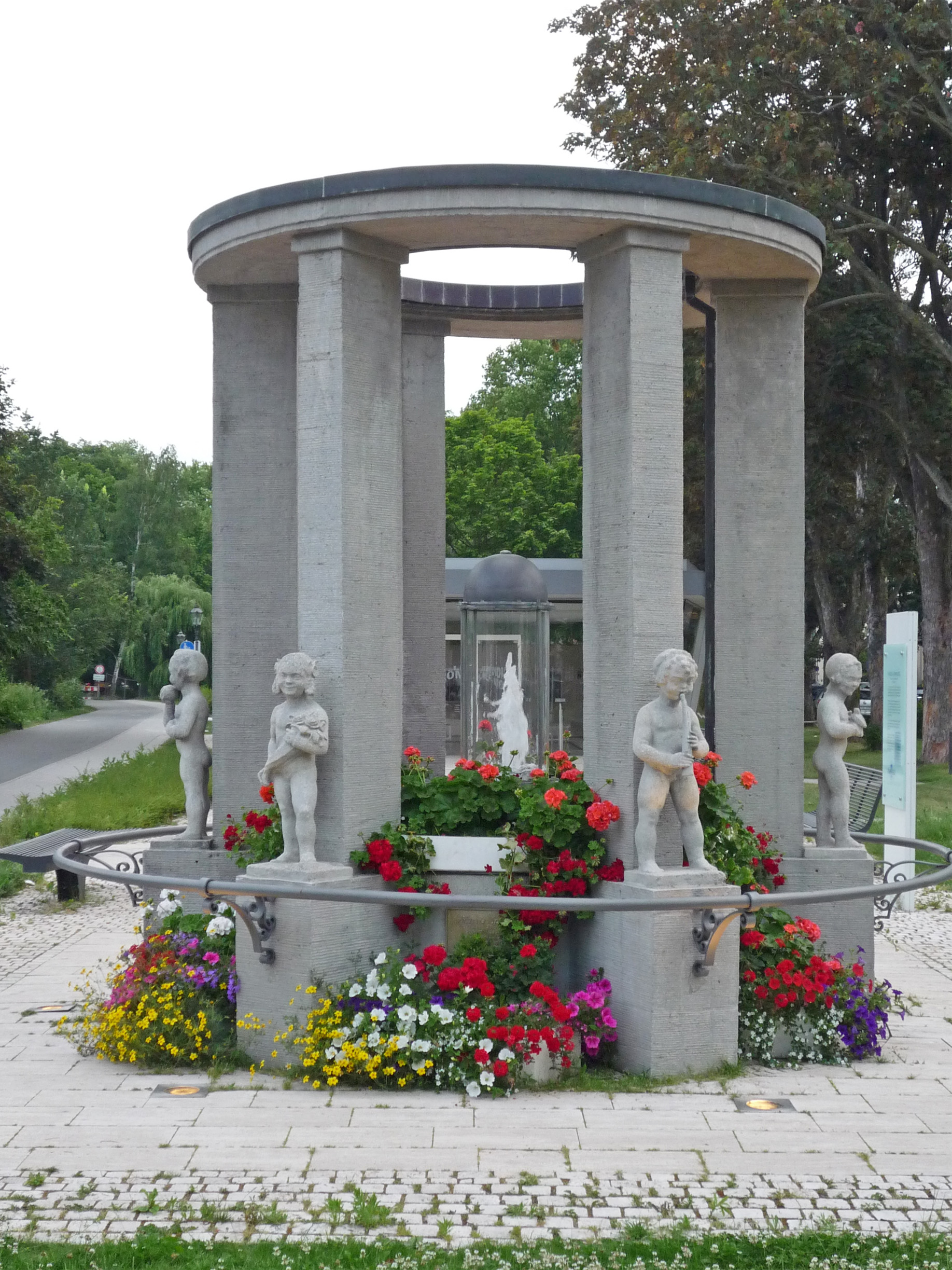
Hassia mineral spring

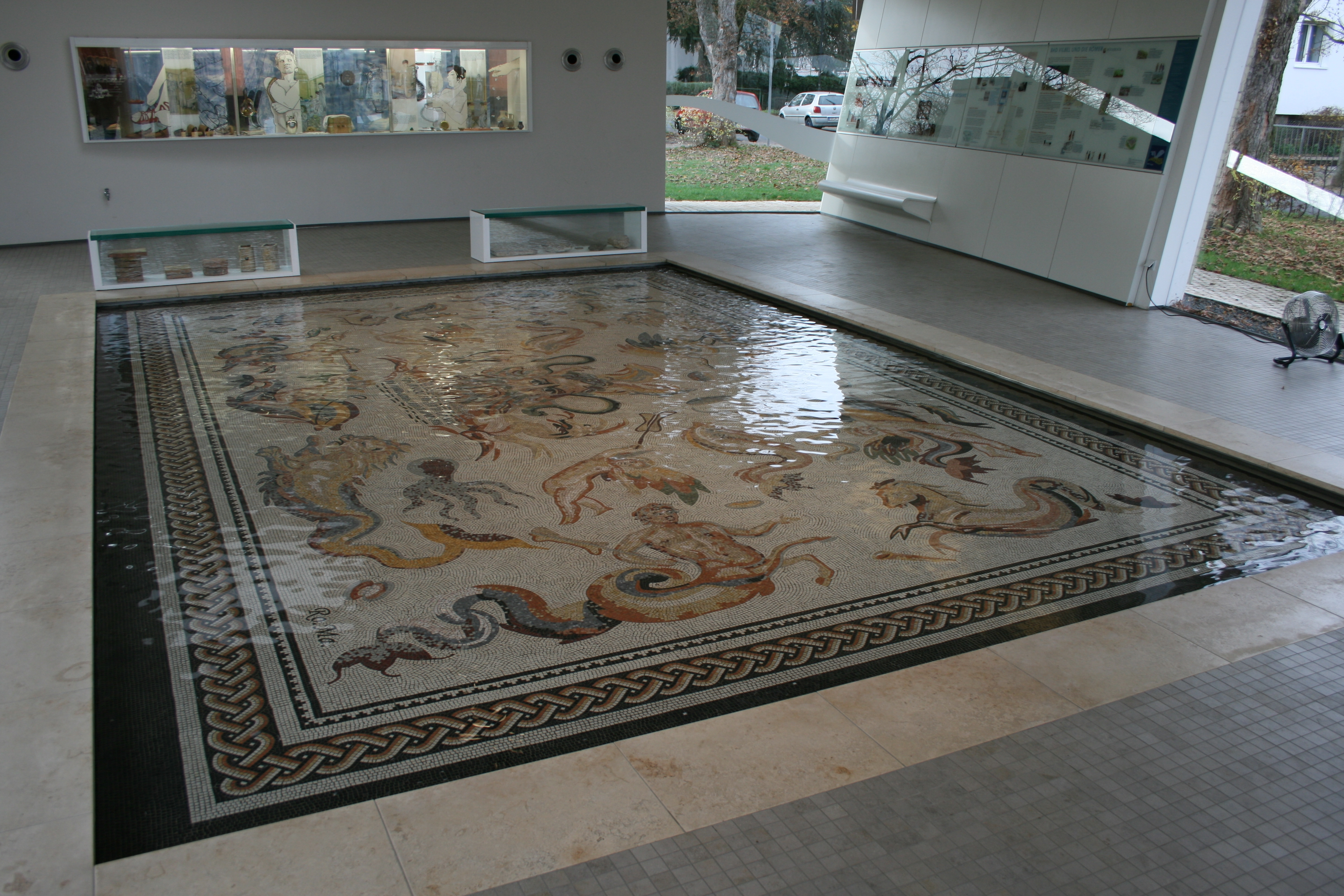
Exhibition of Roman mosaic

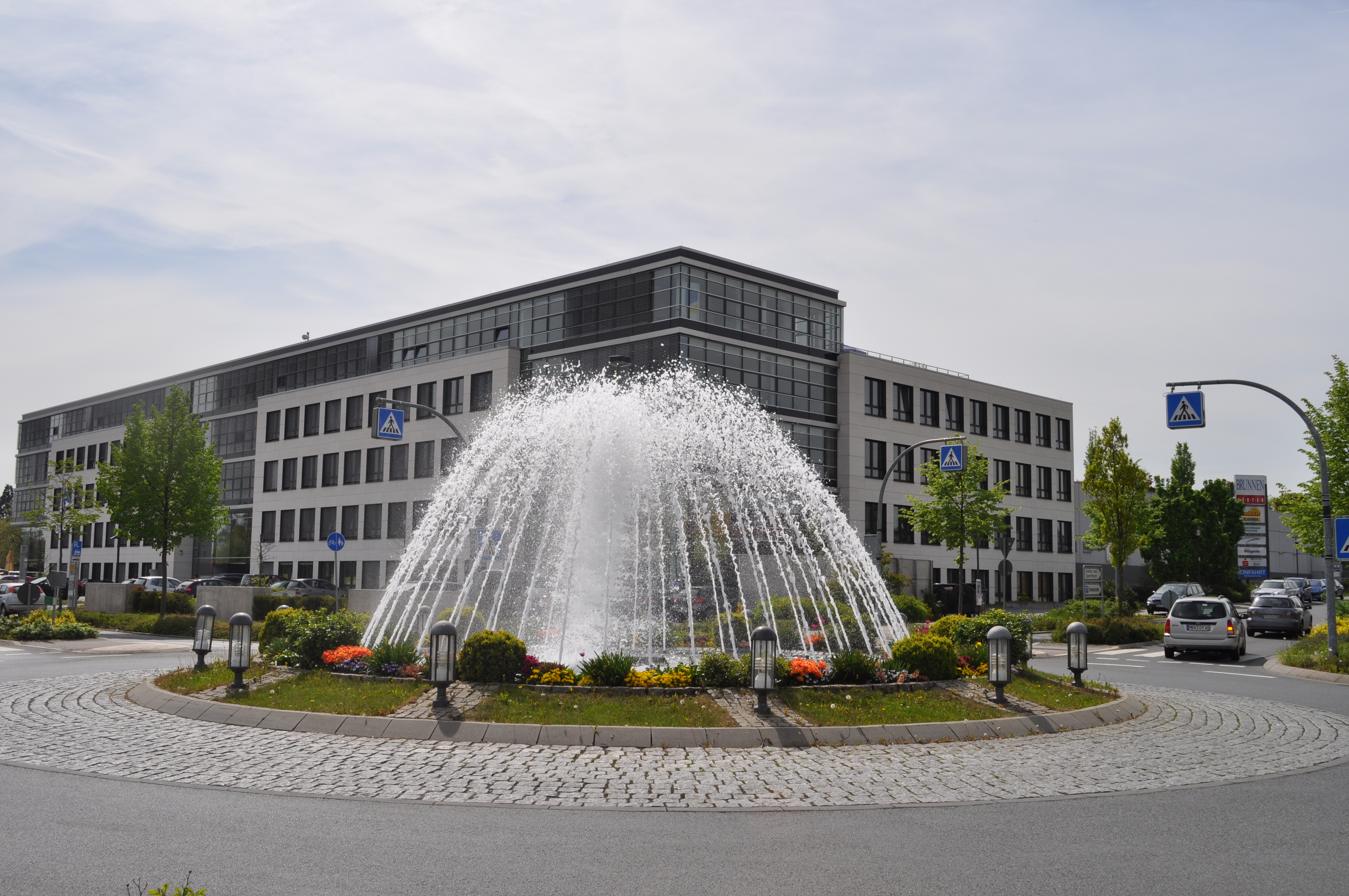
Shopping & business center in Dortelweil

== Mayor ==
The current mayor is Sebastian Wysocki (born 1985) of the Christian Democratic Union of Germany (CDU). He was elected in March 2022.

Past mayors
Name	Party	Time
Thomas Stöhr	CDU	2004-2022
Günther Biwer	CDU	1980-2004
Erich Glück	SPD	1968-1980
Georgh Muth	SPD	1955-1968
Kurt Moosdorf	SPD	1946-1955
Karl Bruder jun.	SPD	1945-1946
Joseph Seitz	NSDAP	1933-1945
Kurt Moosdorf	SPD	1928-1933
Bernhard Rechthien	SPD	1919-1928

== Transport ==
Bad Vilbel has four railway stations (Bad Vilbel, Bad Vilbel Süd and Dortelweil on the Main–Weser Railway and Gronau on the Vilbel–Glauburg-Stockheim railway) served by Frankfurt's local transport network (S-Bahn line S 6 and RE Line 34). It has access to the A661 autobahn and the highway B3.

Furthermore, Bad Vilbel has several local bus lines called Vilbus, connecting the city center to the neighborhoods. There are additional connections to Frankfurt am Main with the local Frankfurt bus line 30 and with Offenbach am Main with the fast bus line X97.

== Hessentag 2025 in Bad Vilbel ==
The 62nd Hessentag, the largest and oldest state festival in Germany, was held in Bad Vilbel from 13 to 22 June 2025, under the motto "Wir bringen Hessen auf die Bühne" ("We bring Hesse onto the stage"). Originally planned for 2020 but cancelled due to the COVID‑19 pandemic, Bad Vilbel hosted the event for the first time in 2025.

Over the ten days, the festival featured more than 1,500 free events and a total of 13,000 program points across cultural, educational, musical and sporting offerings. Visitors enjoyed concerts by artists such as Nina Chuba, Mando Diao and Ski Aggu in the Stadtwerke‑Arena and other venues.

The festival's "Treffpunkt Hessen" forum served as the central showpiece, where the Hessian parliament, political parties, associations and government agencies presented themselves. Highlights included an exhibition on climate, nature and regional products ("Der Natur auf der Spur"). On 14 June the "Day of Volunteer Emergency Responders" included formal recognition by the Minister‑President Boris Rhein.

Bad Vilbel attracted roughly one million visitors across the ten days, according to official figures.

== Twin towns – sister cities ==
Bad Vilbel is twinned with:

- Brotterode-Trusetal, Germany (1990)
- Eldoret, Kenya (1982)
- Glossop, England, United Kingdom (1987)
- Moulins, France (1990)

== See also ==
- Bad Vilbel station
- English electronic music duo Autechre released a song entitled Second Bad Vilbel on their EP Anvil Vapre. The title derives from the town's twinning with Glossop, an area the group would have passed en route to Sheffield, from their homes in Rochdale.
- Asteroid (340980) Bad Vilbel discovered 2007 by Uwe Süßenberger .

== Notable people ==
=== Born in Bad Vilbel ===
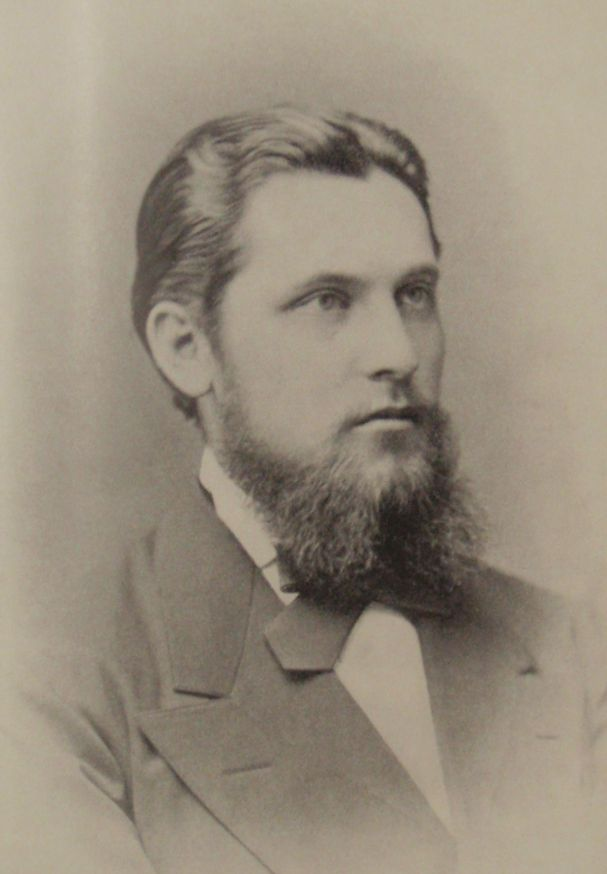
Wilhelm Finck around 1883

- Wilhelm von Finck (1848–1924), banker and co-founder of the Alliance Insurance
- Friedel Lutz (1939-2023), former national soccer player
- Kathrin Anders (born 1982), German politician (The Greens), Members of the Landtag of Hesse since 2019

=== Linked to Bad Vilbel ===
- Klaus Havenstein (1922–1998), actor and television presenter, from 1990 to 1992 director of the Castle Festival Bad Vilbel
- Jürgen Sparwasser (born 1948), is a retired German football player and later briefly a football manager living in Bad Vilbel. He gained fame as East Germany football player at the 1974 FIFA World Cup finals, where he scored the winning goal in a politically prestigious match against West Germany
