= Atlantis: The Antediluvian World =

1882 pseudoarchaeological book by Ignatius L. Donnelly

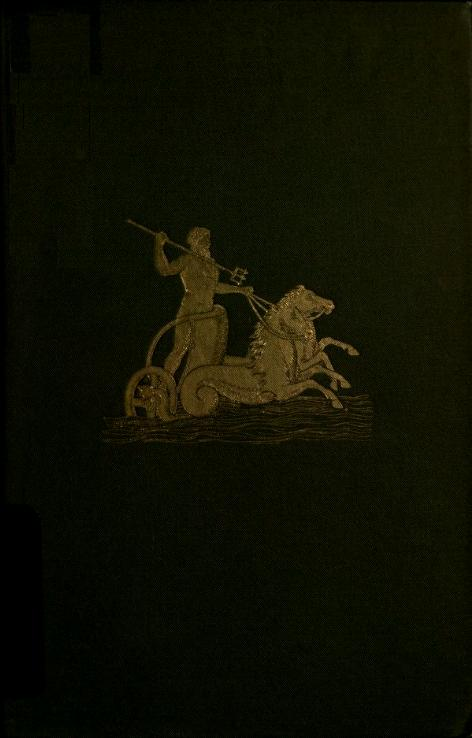
- Cover of the first edition
- Author: Ignatius L. Donnelly
- Language: English
- Subject: Atlantis
- Publisher: Harper & Brothers
- Publication date: 1882
- Publication place: United States
- Followed by: Ragnarok: The Age of Fire and Gravel

Atlantis: The Antediluvian World is a pseudoarchaeological book published in 1882 by the Minnesota populist politician Ignatius L. Donnelly. Donnelly considered Plato's account of Atlantis as largely factual and suggested that all known ancient civilizations were descended from this lost land through a process of hyperdiffusionism.

== Content ==
Many of its theories are the source of many modern-day concepts about Atlantis, including these: the civilization and technology beyond its time, the origins of all present races and civilizations, and a civil war between good and evil. Much of Donnelly's writing, especially with regard to Atlantis as an explanation for similarities between ancient civilizations of the Old and New Worlds, was inspired by the publications of Charles Étienne Brasseur de Bourbourg and the fieldwork of Augustus Le Plongeon in the Yucatan. It was avidly supported by publications of Helena Blavatsky and the Theosophical Society as well as by Rudolf Steiner.

=== Author's stated intentions ===
Donnelly discusses many aspects of his proposed theory in extreme detail. He includes many illustrations as well as charts with lingual similarities. With his book he states that he is trying to prove thirteen distinct hypotheses:

1. There once existed in the Atlantic Ocean, opposite the Mediterranean Sea, a large island, which was the remnant of an Atlantic continent, and known to the ancients as Atlantis.
2. That the description of this island given by Plato is not fable, as has been long supposed, but veritable history.
3. That Atlantis was the region where man first rose from a state of barbarism to civilization.
4. That it became, in the course of ages, a populous and mighty nation, from whose emigrants the shores of the Gulf of Mexico, the Mississippi River, the Amazon River, the Pacific coast of South America, the Mediterranean, the west coast of Europe and Africa, the Baltic, the Black Sea, and the Caspian were populated by civilized nations.
5. That it was the true Antediluvian world: the Garden of Eden; the Gardens of Hesperides; the Elysian Fields; the Gardens of Alcinous; the Mesomphalos, the Olympos; the Asgard of the traditions of the ancient nations. That it represented a universal memory of a great land, where early mankind dwelt for ages in peace and happiness.
6. That the gods and goddesses of the ancient Greeks, the Phoenicians, the Hindus, and the Scandinavians were simply the kings, queens, and heroes of Atlantis; and the acts attributed to them in mythology are a confused recollection of real historical events.
7. That the mythology of Egypt and Peru represented the original religion of Atlantis, which was sun-worship.
8. That the oldest colony formed by Atlantis was probably Egypt, whose civilization was a reproduction of that Atlantic island.
9. That the implements of the "Bronze Age" of Europe were derived from Atlantis. The Atlanteans were also the first manufacturers of iron.
10. That the Phoenician alphabet, parent of all the European alphabets, was derived from an Atlantis alphabet, which was also conveyed by them from Atlantis to the Mayans of Central America.
11. That Atlantis was the original seat of the Aryan or Indo-European family of nations, as well as of the Semitic peoples, and possibly also of the Turanian races.
12. That Atlantis perished in a terrible convulsion of nature, in which the whole island sunk into the ocean, with nearly all its inhabitants.
13. That a few persons escaped in ships and on rafts, and carried to the nations east and west the tidings of the appalling catastrophe, which has survived to our own time in the Flood and Deluge legends of the different nations of the old and new worlds.

=== Criticisms and responses ===
Carl Abott from the Public Domain Review claims that Ignatius Donnelly's Atlantis: The Antediluvian World may have brought some relief from the turmoil of stressful times in the late 1800s, but was ultimately a reflection of the United States during a time where urbanization, industrialization, and wealth were destroying the nation's golden age of the agrarian frontier. Abbott refers to Donnely as a "Master of Disaster," due to the fact that Antediluvian World and his other two novels seemed to highlight catastrophe. In Antediluvian World specifically, Abbott claims that Donnelly cites deluge myths and legends from the world rather than recreating catastrophe in his own words.

Author and researcher Jason Colavito refers to Atlantis, the Antediluvian World as the platonic ideal of fringe history. He notes Donnelly found interest in Plato's Timaeus and Critias not because he had an interest in prehistory, but because the dialogues reminded him of the problems in contemporary history. Colavito also states that Plato's writings about Atlantis were not the only inspiration for his book, but that Donnelly also found inspiration in John Thomas Short’s novel The North Americans of Antiquity, one that Donnelly essentially plagiarized from Short in his own writing, at times even word for word.

For Donnelly, Atlantis was a stand-in of sorts for America. He fully believed that Atlantis was dominated by a superior white race. Donnelly’s Atlantis reflected his ideal society, a society in which a white race ruled, but everyone still had a share. Colavito also claims that at the end of Donnelly’s writing, Donnelly describes the fall of Atlantis as a decline from perfection to corruption. Donnelly ultimately compared the decline of Atlantis to America and the British Empire, stating that just as Atlantis had fallen, America would too. Colavito points out the fact that most readers approach Atlantis: The Antediluvian World as a book of pseudoscience rather than a political statement of the Reconstruction era, and that politics during the time of which Donnelly wrote this novel are inseparable from the writing itself.

Author Christian Lekon writes that Donnelly characterizes the ancient myths in Atlantis: The Antediluvian World as a "confused recollection of real historical events". Donnelly's writing not only references Plato's description of Atlantis, but also references Greek and Scandinavian deities, as well as various other religious motifs.

The author Edward Platt at Aeon references Sprague de Camp's writings and how Camp notes that Donnelly's were either wrong or had been disproven by subsequent discoveries. Camp also notes that even if Donnelly's facts hadn’t been wrong, he had still drawn the wrong conclusions from them. Platt writes that this did not stop Antediluvian World from selling and later influencing people like Helena Petrovna Blavatsky and further ideas of Atlantis.

== Legacy ==
In 1883, a sequel or companion, Ragnarok: The Age of Fire and Gravel, was published.

Donnelly's work on Atlantis inspired books by James Churchward on the lost continent of Mu, also known as Lemuria.

In 1890, Donnelly published Caesar's Column: A Story of the Twentieth Century, a dystopian novel that follows catastrophe similar to Atlantis: The Antediluvian World and Ragnarok: The Age of Fire and Gravel.

== See also ==
- The Lost Continent: The Story of Atlantis
- Atlantida
