= Caesar's Column =

1890 novel by Ignatius Donnelly

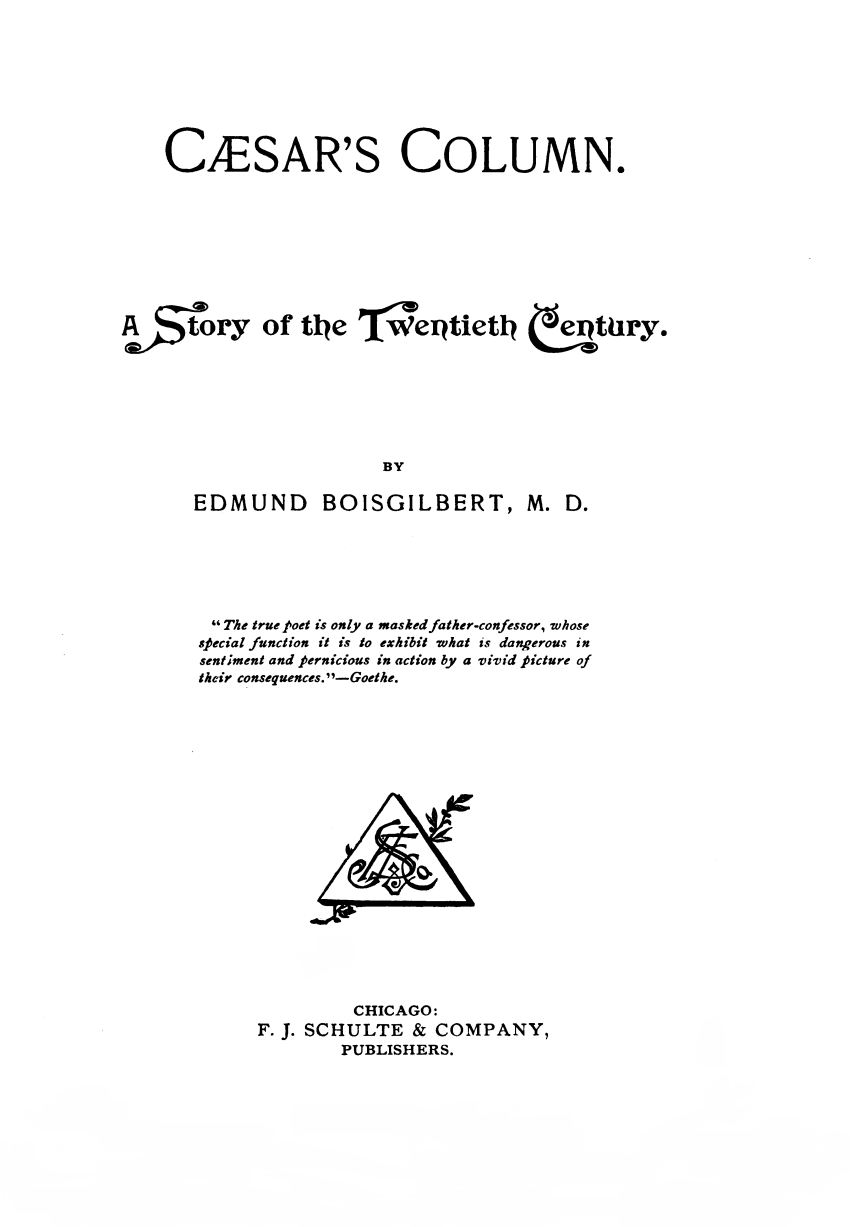
- Title page of the first edition.
- Author: Ignatius L. Donnelly (as "Edmund Boisgilbert, M.D.")
- Language: English
- Genre: Apocalyptic fiction Science fiction Speculative fiction Utopian and dystopian fiction
- Publisher: F. J. Schulte & Co.
- Publication date: 1890
- Publication place: Chicago, United States
- Media type: Print (Hardcover)
- Pages: 367

Caesar's Column: A Story of the Twentieth Century is a novel by Ignatius Donnelly, famous as the author of Atlantis: The Antediluvian World (1882). Caesar's Column was published pseudonymously in 1890. The book has been variously categorized as science fiction, speculative fiction, dystopian fiction, and/or apocalyptic fiction; one critic has termed it an "Apocalyptic Utopia."

The book is also a political novel, and a romance. It was a popular success as well, selling 60,000 copies upon its initial publication. Its sales eventually comprised 250,000 copies. Donnelly's novel was one element of the great wave of utopian and dystopian literature during the later nineteenth century and the early twentieth, exemplified by works like Edward Bellamy's Looking Backward and Jack London's The Iron Heel.

== Politics ==
Caesar's Column is partly based on Donnelly's commitment to agrarian Populism. In 1892, two years after the publication of his novel, Donnelly drafted the platform of the Populist Party, in which he wrote,

"A vast conspiracy against mankind has been organized on two continents, and it is rapidly taking possession of the world. If not met and overthrown at once it forebodes terrible social convulsions, the destruction of civilization, or the establishment of an absolute despotism."

This is the world view of Caesar's Column: a man comes from his rural environment to the heart of a brutal capitalist oligarchy; he sees its corruptions firsthand, and witnesses its destruction.

Donnelly's novel partly concerns the debated question of the alleged anti-Semitism of the Populist movement. Donnelly's villain is an Italian Jew — but his protagonist has a name, Weltstein, that must have suggested a Jewish identity to many readers. The issue of whether Caesar's Column is an anti-Semitic work is dealt with in some detail by Nicholas Ruddick in the introduction to his scholarly edition of the novel. His conclusion is that while Donnelly did use anti-Semitic stereotypes, "he did so probably not to incite anti-Semitic hatred, but to dramatize a larger theme: that unless there is social justice for all, victims will turn into victimizers and social self-destruction will ensue."

== Plot ==
As some other speculative writers did (Anna Bowman Dodd's 1887 book The Republic of the Future is a contemporaneous example), Donnelly cast his fiction in the form of an epistolary novel. His first-person narrator Gabriel Weltstein writes a series of letters to his brother, recounting his experiences during a 1988 visit to New York. Weltstein is a wool merchant from Uganda (early Zionist thinkers considered the possibility of founding a Jewish state in Uganda). Weltstein wants to avoid dealing with an international cartel and sell wool directly to American manufacturers.

Like many utopian/dystopian writers, Donnelly dwells on the technological changes of the future. Weltstein travels to New York City by airship; he is dazzled by the city's brilliant illumination, powered by tapping into the Aurora Borealis. In the city, subways operate along 'subterranean streets' and, at ground level, streets are covered by 'roofs of glass'. At the Hotel Darwin, Weltstein finds a televised menu to guide him among exotic choices, from edible spiders to bird's nests from China. Televised newspapers are readily available.

Weltstein soon gets into trouble, when he stops a coachman from beating a beggar. The coach belongs to Prince Cabano, formerly Jacob Isaacs, a prime figure of the ruling oligarchy; the beggar is Max Petion, actually a leader of a secret resistance organization called the Brotherhood of Destruction. Weltstein has to accept Petion's guidance into proletarian society in New York City, where he learns the truth of the rapacious and oppressive social and economic order.

Gabriel meets the president of the brotherhood, Caesar Lomellini, a dangerous and ruthless fanatic and an imposing physical presence, half Italian and half Negro. The middle section of the novel devotes attention to the romantic involvements of Gabriel and Max Petion, who rescue young women from exploitation. The two couples marry in a bucolic episode that counterpoints the scenes of urban oppression and violence that bracket it. (The four characters escape New York for Uganda at the end of the book, providing a sort of happy ending, which likely enhanced the novel's popularity.)

The Brotherhood of Destruction finally organizes a rebellion, which succeeds in deposing the oligarchs, though at the cost of massive casualties. (Technology has produced advanced weapons like "dynamite bullets" that increase the carnage.) Lomellini orders the corpses piled high in Union Square and entombed in layers of concrete—though Lomellini himself is murdered as the mass grave is started. Gabriel Weltstein, fleeing New York by airship, looks back to see the vast cityscape in flames, while the mass grave—Caesar's column—rises through the smoke.
