= Kathrin Anders =

German politician

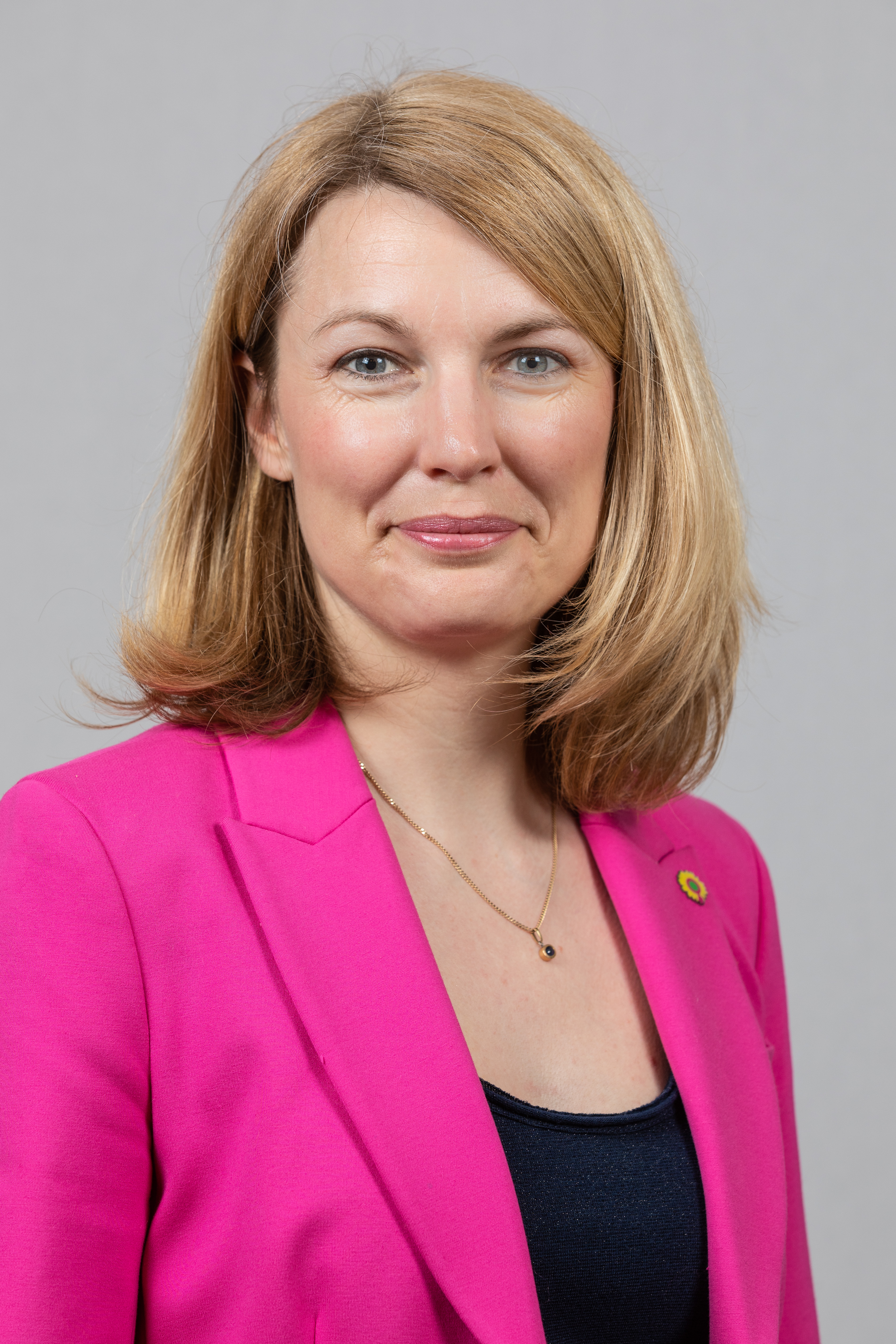
- Anders in 2019

Members of the Landtag of Hesse
- Incumbent
- Assumed office January 2019

Personal details
- Born: Kathrin Anders; 1982 (age 43–44) Bad Vilbel, Germany
- Party: Alliance 90/The Greens

Kathrin Anders (born 3 May 1982 in Bad Vilbel) is a German politician (Alliance 90/The Greens) and since 2019 member of the Landtag of Hesse.

== Life ==
Anders trained as an educator and studied social pedagogy at the Frankfurt University of Applied Sciences. Since 2014, she has been a teacher at an elementary school. Anders is divorced and the mother of three children.

== Politics ==
Anders is a member of the Bad Vilbel City Council, and as a parliamentary group leader, for her party. In the 2013 Hessian state election, she ran in the Wetterau I constituency, but was not elected to parliament with 10.3% of the primary vote. In the 2018 Hessian state election, she did not run as a direct candidate, but entered the state parliament via her party's list.
