= Ignatius L. Donnelly =

American politician and fringe theorist (1831–1901)

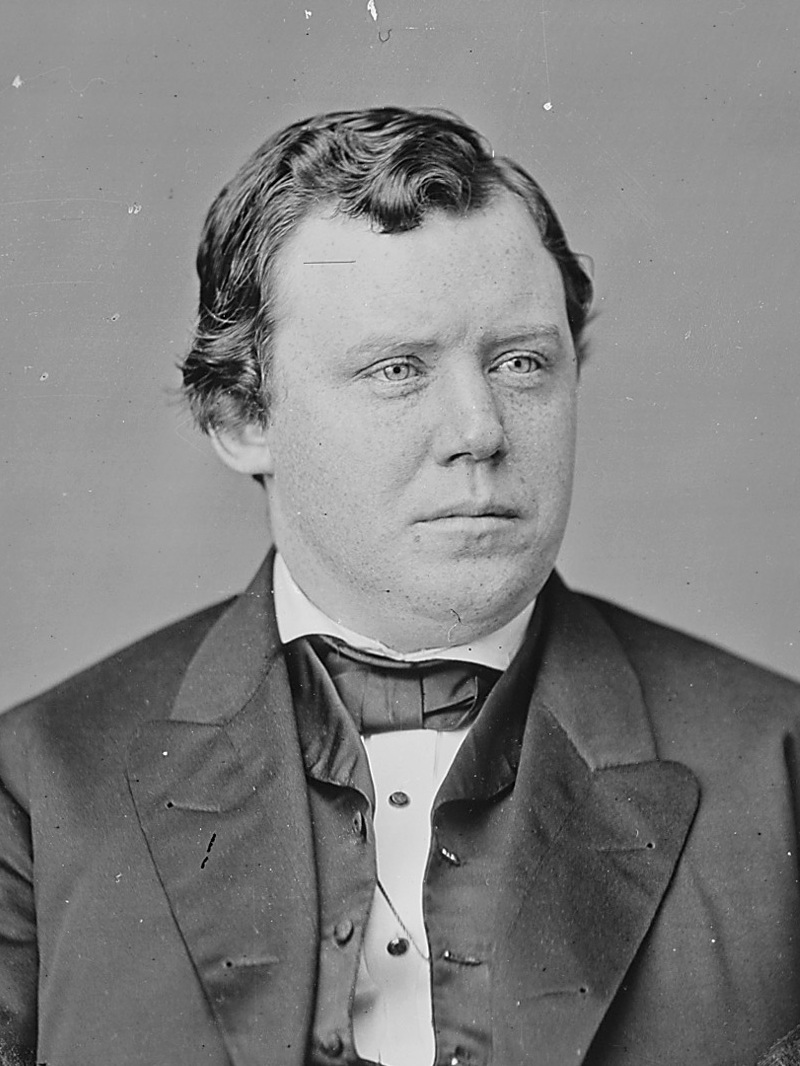
- Portrait by Brady c. 1860–1865

Member of the Minnesota House of Representatives
- In office January 4, 1897 – January 1, 1899
- Constituency: 24th district
- In office January 3, 1887 – January 6, 1889
- Constituency: 25th district

Member of the Minnesota Senate
- In office January 5, 1891 – January 6, 1895
- Constituency: 24th district
- In office January 6, 1874 – January 6, 1879
- Constituency: 20th district

Member of the U.S. House of Representatives from Minnesota's 2nd district
- In office March 4, 1863 – March 3, 1869
- Preceded by: Cyrus Aldrich
- Succeeded by: Eugene McLanahan Wilson

2nd Lieutenant Governor of Minnesota
- In office January 2, 1860 – March 4, 1863
- Governor: Alexander Ramsey
- Preceded by: William Holcombe
- Succeeded by: Henry Adoniram Swift

Personal details
- Born: Ignatius Loyola Donnelly; November 3, 1831 Philadelphia, Pennsylvania, U.S.
- Died: January 1, 1901 (aged 69) Minneapolis, Minnesota, U.S.
- Party: Democratic (before 1857, 1884–1887); Republican (1857–1884); Independent (1887–1892); People's (1892–1901)
- Spouses: Katherine McCaffrey (m. 1855; died 1894); Marian Hanson (m. 1898)
- Children: 3
- Profession: Attorney; Author

Ignatius Loyola Donnelly (November 3, 1831 – January 1, 1901) was an American U.S. representative, populist writer, and pseudoscientist. He is known primarily now for his fringe theories concerning Atlantis, Catastrophism (especially the idea of an ancient impact event affecting ancient civilizations), and Shakespearean authorship. These works are widely regarded as examples of pseudoscience and pseudohistory.

== Life and career ==
Donnelly was the son of Philip Carrol Donnelly, an immigrant from Fintona, County Tyrone, Ireland, who had settled in Philadelphia, Pennsylvania. His sister was the writer Eleanor C. Donnelly. On June 29, 1826, Philip had married Catherine Gavin, who was the daughter of John Gavin, also an immigrant from Fintona, County Tyrone, Ireland. After starting as a peddler, Philip studied medicine at the Philadelphia College of Medicine.

Catherine provided for her children by operating a pawn shop. Ignatius, her youngest son, was admitted to the prestigious Central High School, the second oldest public high school in the United States. There he studied under the presidency of John S. Hart, excelling primarily in literature.

Donnelly decided to become a lawyer and became a clerk for Benjamin Brewster, who later became Attorney General of the United States. Donnelly was admitted to the bar in 1852. In 1855, he married Katherine McCaffrey, with whom he had three children. In 1855, he resigned his clerkship, entered politics with campaign speeches for Democratic candidates, and participated in communal home building schemes. He fell away from the Catholic Church sometime in the 1850s, and thereafter, never participated in any organized religion.

Donnelly moved to the Minnesota Territory in 1857 amidst rumors of a financial scandal, and there he settled in Dakota County. He initiated a utopian community called Nininger City, together with several partners. However, the Panic of 1857 doomed the attempt at a cooperative farm and community and left Donnelly deeply in debt.

His wife Katherine died in 1894. In 1898, he married his secretary, Marian Hanson.

Donnelly died on January 1, 1901, in Minneapolis, Minnesota, age 69 years. He is buried at Calvary Cemetery in St. Paul, Minnesota. His personal papers are archived at the Minnesota Historical Society.

== Political and literary career ==
Donnelly entered politics, now a Republican, with two unsuccessful campaigns for the state legislature (1857, 1858). Despite not being elected, Donnelly was recognized as a highly effective political speaker, which led to a successful campaign for lieutenant governor, a position he held from 1860 to 1863. He was a Radical Republican Congressman from Minnesota in the 38th, 39th, and 40th congresses, (1863–1869), a state senator from 1874 to 1878 and 1891–1894 and a state representative from 1887 to 1888 and 1897–1898. As a legislator, he advocated extending the powers of the Freedmen's Bureau to provide education for freedmen so that they could protect themselves once the bureau was withdrawn. Donnelly was also an early supporter of women's suffrage. After leaving the Minnesota State Senate in 1878, he returned to his law practice and writing.

In 1877, Donnelly spoke at a meeting of 10,000 people where he read his preamble to the People's Party conference platform. The document of 12 short paragraphs, as altered slightly for the first nominating convention in Omaha that July, was the pithiest and soon became the most widely circulated statement of the Populist credo. Donnelly discussed corruption within politics and voting, and newspapers that distributed false and biased material. He stressed that Populists needed to take back their own country.

In 1882, he published Atlantis: The Antediluvian World, his best-known work. It details theories concerning the mythical lost continent of Atlantis. The book sold well and is widely credited with initiating the theme of Atlantis as an antediluvian civilization that became such a feature of popular literature during the 20th century and contributed to the emergence of Mayanism. Donnelly suggested that Atlantis, whose story was told by Plato in the dialogues Timaeus and Critias, had been destroyed during the event remembered in the Bible as the Great Flood. He cited research on the ancient Maya civilization by Charles Étienne Brasseur de Bourbourg and Augustus Le Plongeon, claiming that Atlantis had been the common origin of ancient civilizations in Africa (especially ancient Egypt), Europe, and the Americas. He also thought that it had been the original home of an Aryan race whose red-haired, blue-eyed descendants could be found in Ireland. Donnelly wrote that Ireland was the "Garden of Phoebus" (Hyperborea) of the Western mythologists.

A year after Atlantis, he published Ragnarok: The Age of Fire and Gravel, in which he expounded his belief that the Flood, as well as the destruction of Atlantis and the extinction of the mammoth, had been brought about by the near-collision of the Earth with a massive comet. This book also sold well, and both books seem to have had an important influence on the development of Immanuel Velikovsky's controversial ideas half a century later.

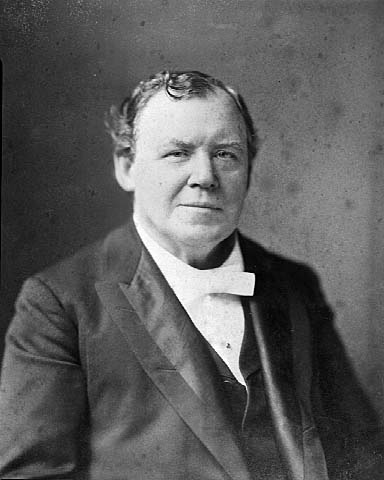
Donnelly c. 1898 by Frederick Gutekunst

In 1888, he published The Great Cryptogram in which he proposed that Shakespeare's plays had been written by Francis Bacon, an idea that was popular during the late 19th and early 20th century. He then traveled to England to arrange the English publication of his book by Sampson Low, speaking at the Oxford (and Cambridge) Union in which his thesis "Resolved, that the works of William Shakespeare were composed by Francis Bacon" was put to an unsuccessful vote. The book was a complete failure, and Donnelly was discredited.

Donnelly also made several other campaigns for public office during the 1880s. He made a losing campaign for Congress, this time as a Democrat, in 1884. In 1887, he successfully campaigned for a seat in the Minnesota State Legislature as an independent. During this period, he was also an organizer of the Minnesota Farmers' Alliance.

In 1892, Donnelly wrote the preamble of the People's Party's Omaha Platform for the presidential campaign of that year. He was nominated for Vice President of the United States in 1900 by the People's Party, also known as the Populist Party. The People's Party was a development of the National Farmers' Alliance, and had a platform that demanded the abandonment of the gold standard and later for the adoption of free silver, the abolition of national banks, a graduated income tax, a direct election of senators, civil service reform, and an eight-hour day. That year, Donnelly also campaigned for governor of Minnesota but was defeated.

The People's Party protested the railroad companies corrupting government and advocated government regulation of the railroads. Donnelly had a key leadership role in this party, yet he received $10,000 from the Lake Superior and Mississippi Railroad Company.

== State park ==
During the 1930s, an organization was formed to lobby for the creation of a state park at Donnelly's home at Nininger near Hastings, Minnesota. The house was still standing in 1939, but the effort failed and the house has since been demolished.

== Reception ==
Donnelly's writings on Atlantis have been rejected by scholars and scientists. He has been described as a crank and pseudoscience promoter. Gordon Stein has noted that "most of what Donnelly said was highly questionable or downright wrong."

However, Donnelly's concept of "hyperdiffusionism," which purports to detect prehistoric catastrophes in the mythologies of multiple unrelated cultures, is credited as inspiring J. R. R. Tolkien's fictional Númenor. In his 1939 essay "On Fairy-Stories," Tolkien gave some credence to diffusion as a source of mythology.

== Works ==
His books include:

- The Mourner's Vision: A Poem (1850), a long poem he wrote at the age of 18.
- Atlantis: The Antediluvian World (1882), in which he attempted to establish that all known ancient civilizations were descended from its high-Neolithic culture.
- Ragnarok: The Age of Fire and Gravel (1883), in which he proposed that a comet hit the earth in prehistoric times and destroyed a high civilization.
- The Shakespeare Myth (1887)
- Essay on the Sonnets of Shakespeare
- The Great Cryptogram: Francis Bacon's Cipher in Shakespeare's Plays (1888), in which he maintained he had discovered codes in the works of Shakespeare indicating that their true author was Francis Bacon.
- Caesar's Column (1890), a science fiction novel set during 1988 about a worker revolt against a global oligarchy. (Published under the pseudonym of Edmund Boisgilbert.)
- Doctor Huguet: A Novel (1891) (Published under the pseudonym of Edmund Boisgilbert.)
- The Golden Bottle or the Story of Ephraim Benezet of Kansas (1892)
- The Bryan Campaign for the American People's Money (1896)
- The Cipher in the Plays, and on the Tombstone (1899)

== Sources ==
- Bovee, John (1969). 'Doctor Huguet: Donnelly on Being Black', Minnesota History, vol. 41 (no. 6), pp. 286–94.
- William Friedman and Elizebeth Friedman, The Shakespearean ciphers examined, Cambridge University Press, 1957. Chapter III.
- Hicks, John D. (1921). "The Political Career of Ignatius Donnelly". Mississippi Valley Historical Review. 8 (1–2): 80–132. doi:10.2307/1889278. JSTOR 1889278.
- Ridge, M (1962). Ignatius Donnelly: The Portrait of a Politician, Chicago: University of Chicago Press, reprinted 1991 by Minnesota Historical Society Press.
- United States Congress. "DONNELLY, Ignatius (id: D000417)". Biographical Directory of the United States Congress. in the Biographical Directory of the United States Congress

Political offices
Preceded by William Holcombe	Lieutenant Governor of Minnesota; 1860–1863	Succeeded by Henry Adoniram Swift
U.S. House of Representatives
Preceded by New district	U.S. Representative from Minnesota's 2nd congressional district 1863–1869	Succeeded by Eugene McLanahan Wilson
Party political offices
First	Populist Party nominee for Governor of Minnesota; 1892	Succeeded by Sidney M. Owen
Preceded by Thomas E. Watson	Populist Party vice presidential candidate 1900 (lost)	Succeeded by Thomas Tibbles
