= Ragnarok: The Age of Fire and Gravel =

Book by Ignatius Donnelly

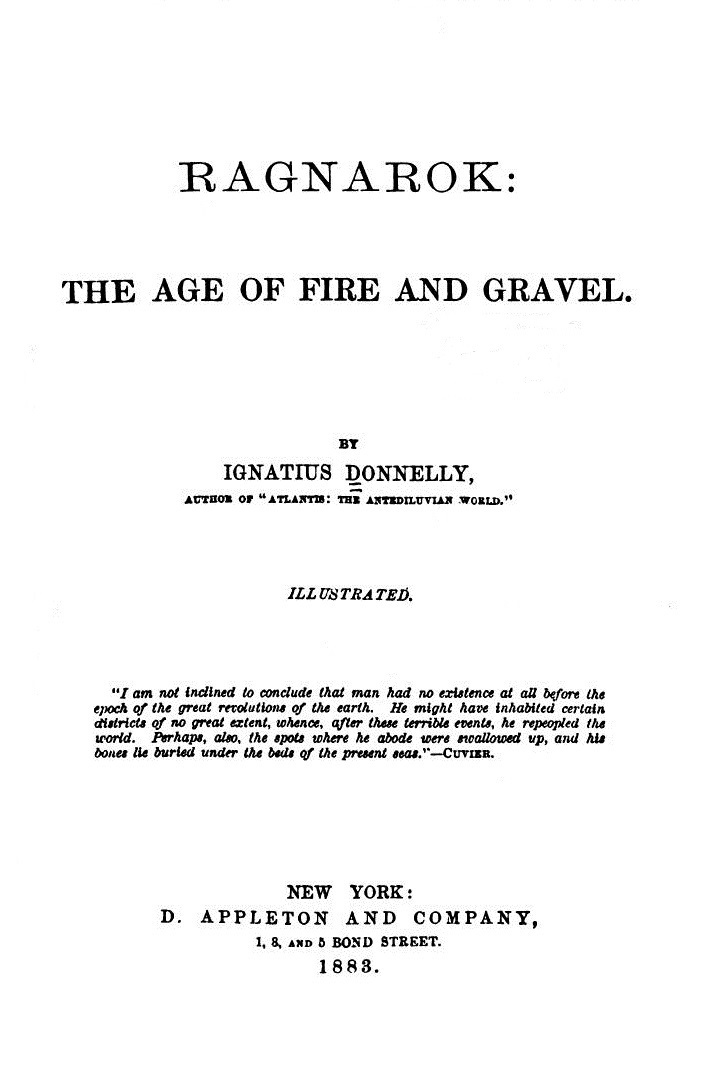
- Title page of the first edition
- Author: Ignatius L. Donnelly
- Language: English
- Publisher: D. Appleton & Company
- Publication date: 1883
- Publication place: United States
- Pages: 441

Ragnarok: The Age of Fire and Gravel is a book by American politician Ignatius L. Donnelly published first in 1883. It is a companion to the more well-known work Atlantis: The Antediluvian World.

== Author's arguments ==
In Ragnarok, Donnelly argues that an enormous comet hit the earth 30,000 years ago, resulting in widespread fires, floods, poisonous gases, and unusually vicious and prolonged winters. The catastrophe destroyed a more advanced civilization, forcing its terrified population to seek shelter in caves. As cave-dwellers, they lost all knowledge of art, literature, music, philosophy, and engineering (see Ragnarök), except in Atlantis, which became a refugium for survivors from that more advanced civilization (see Ragnarök).

He cites as evidence 900-foot-deep cracks radiating outward from the Great Lakes, and stretching for many miles away. He admits it has been proposed that ice-sheets caused these cracks, but suggests that this explanation is improbable, likening them instead to "cracks in a window which has been struck with a stone". If ice sheets could produce such cracks, he asks, why have not similar cracks been found anywhere else on the globe? He adds to this a discussion of surface rocks in New York City, which seem to have undergone a radical chemical change—the feldspar has been converted into slate and the mica has separated out from the iron, as if they had undergone tremendous heat and pressure, as they likely would in the event that a comet struck the earth. He rules out other theories that could have caused this, such as nitric acid and warm rains, by stating that this is an isolated incident, whereas warm rains can occur at any time and place and there's no archaeological evidence for the nitric acid's origins.

He indicates many legends and myths from various cultures, such as Zoroastrian, Pictish, Hindu, and Ancient Greece, that are all suggestive of a comet striking the earth, the earth catching fire, poisonous gases choking people, and floods and tidal waves swamping large areas. He also discusses early culture's tendency to heliotheism, which he said evolved from gratitude to the Sun, after so many horrific days without it.

== See also ==
- Ancient Apocalypse
