= Pension Schöller (play) =

Comedy by Carl Laufs and Wilhelm Jacoby

Pension Schöller (English:The Schöller Boardinghouse) is a German comedy play by Wilhelm Jacoby and Carl Laufs which was first performed in 1890. The play was originally performed at Wallner Theatre in Berlin and quickly became a staple of German comic literature.

== Film adaptations ==
The play has been turned into films on three occasions, in 1930, 1952 and 1960, all of them directed by George Jacoby. There have also been several television versions.

== Bibliography ==
- Grange, William. Historical Dictionary of German Theater. Scarecrow Press, 2006.
