= Carl Laufs =

German playwright (1858–1900)

Carl Laufs (1858 – 1900) was a German playwright who concentrated largely on creating farces, notably the 1890 work Pension Schöller which he co-authored with Wilhelm Jacoby.

== Bibliography ==
- Grange, William. Historical Dictionary of German Theater. Scarecrow Press, 2006.
