= Wilhelm Jacoby =

German playwright (1855–1925)

Wilhelm Jacoby (1855–1925) was a German playwright, who concentrated largely on creating farces notably the 1890 work Pension Schöller which he co-authored with Carl Laufs. He was the father of the film director George Jacoby, who adapted Pension Schöller into film on three occasions.

== Selected works ==
- The Duchess of Athens (1883)
- Pension Schöller (1890)

== Bibliography ==
- Grange, William. Historical Dictionary of German Theater. Scarecrow Press, 2006.
