= The Man in the Iron Mask (1923 film) =

German silent adventure film by Max Glass

- Directed by: Max Glass
- Written by: Paul O'Montis; R. Saklikower
- Based on: The Man in the Iron Masque; 1848 novel by Alexandre Dumas
- Starring: Albert Bassermann; Bruno Decarli; Vladimir Gajdarov
- Cinematography: Heinz Kluth; László Schäffer; A.O. Weitzenberg
- Production company: Terra Film
- Distributed by: Terra Film
- Release date: January 1923
- Running time: 112 minutes
- Country: Germany
- Languages: Silent; German intertitles

The Man in the Iron Mask (German: Der Mann mit der eisernen Maske) is a 1923 German silent adventure film directed by Max Glass and starring Albert Bassermann, Bruno Decarli, and Vladimir Gajdarov. It was shot at the Terra Studios in Berlin. The film's sets were designed by the art director Robert A. Dietrich.

== Cast ==
- Albert Bassermann – Jules Mazarin
- Bruno Decarli – Gaston d'Aubigny
- Vladimir Gajdarov – Louis XIV
- Helga Molander – Etienne de Tiffanges
- Wilhelm Diegelmann – Wirt
- Ludwig Hartau
- Emil Heyse
- Joseph Klein
- Friedrich Kühne
- Leopold von Ledebur
- Lina Lossen – Anne of Austria
- Erich Pabst
- Max Ruhbeck
- Franz Schönfeld
- Hermine Sterler
- Magnus Stifter

== Bibliography ==
- Buchanan, Roderick D. Playing With Fire: The Controversial Career of Hans J. Eysenck. Oxford University Press, 2010.
