= Madonna of the Sleeping Cars =

Madonna of the Sleeping Cars (French:La madone des sleepings) may refer to

- Madonna of the Sleeping Cars (novel), a 1925 novel by Maurice Dekobra
- Madonna of the Sleeping Cars (1928 film), a French silent film directed by Marco de Gastyne and Maurice Gleize
- Madonna of the Sleeping Cars (1955 film), a French film directed by Henri Diamant-Berger
