= Vladimir Gajdarov =

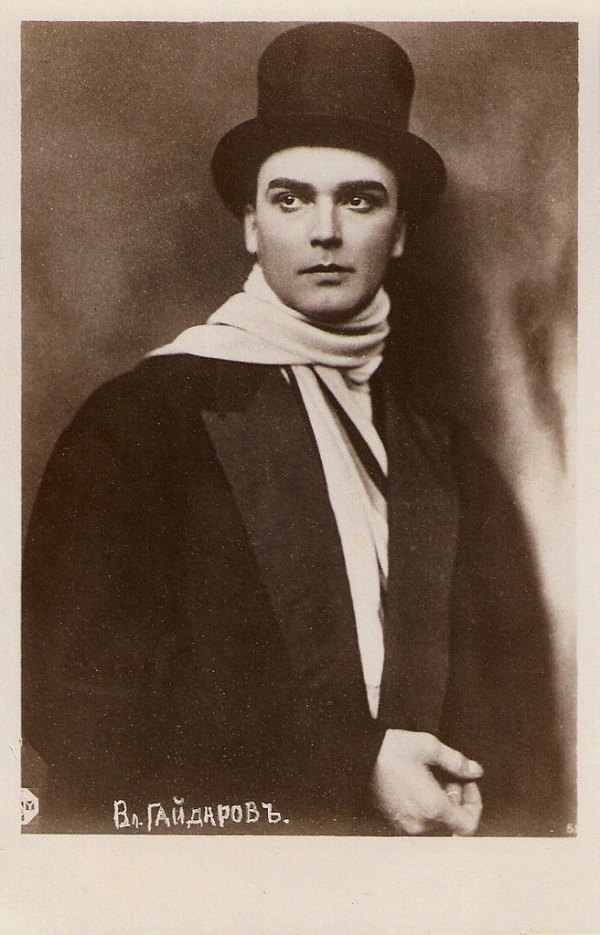
- Born: Vladimir Georgievich Gajdarov; July 25, 1893; Poltava, Russian Empire (now Ukraine)
- Died: 17 November 1978 (aged 85); Leningrad (now Saint Petersburg), USSR
- Other names: Wladimir Gaiderow; Vladimir Gaidarow
- Occupation: Actor
- Years active: 1917–1968
- Spouse: Olga Gzovskaya

Vladimir Georgievich Gajdarov (Russian: Владимир Георгиевич Гайдаров; 25 July 1893 – 17 November 1978) was a Russian film actor and star of Russian and German silent cinema.

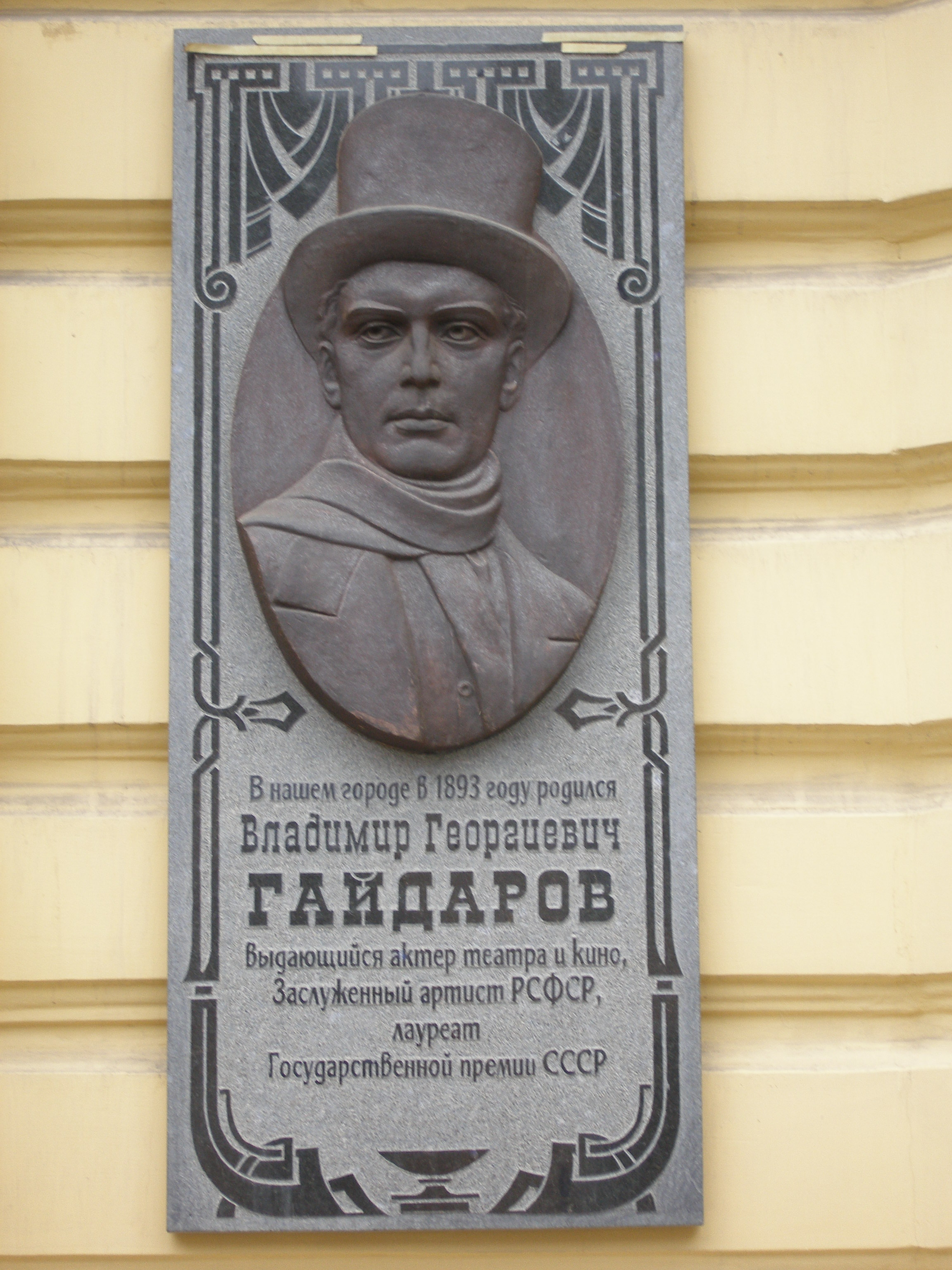
Plaque of Gajdarov in Poltava

== Filmography ==
- Father Sergius (1917), as Nicholas I of Russia
- Yeyo zhertva (1917)
- Ne nado krovi (1917)
- Iola (1920)
- Die Gezeichneten (1922), as Jakow Segal
- The Burning Soil (1922), as Johannes Rog
- The Man in the Iron Mask (1923), as Louis XIV
- Tragedy of Love (1923), as André Rabatin
- The Countess of Paris (1923)
- Love of Life (1924)
- Helena (1924), as Paris
- Liebet das Leben (as Wladimir Gaiderow) (1924)
- Reluctant Imposter (1925)
- The Wife of Forty Years (1925)
- The Night Watch (1925)
- Michel Strogoff (1926), as Tzar Alexandre of Russia
- Manon Lescaut (1926), as Des Grieux
- Battle of the Sexes (as Vladimir Gaidarow) (1926)
- The Circus of Life (1926)
- Madonna of the Sleeping Cars (as Vladimir Gaidaroff) (1927)
- Alpine Tragedy (1927)
- The White Slave (as Wladimir Gaidaroff) (1927), as Ali Benver Bey
- Alpenglühen (1927)
- Story of a Poor Young Man (as Wladimir Gaidaroff) (1927)
- Orient (as Wladimir Gaiderow) (1928)
- The Woman on the Rack (1928)
- The Lady with the Mask (1928), as Alexander von Illagin
- Rasputin (1928)
- Heilige oder Dirne (1929)
- Kire lained (1930)
- Louise, Queen of Prussia (1931), as Zar Alexander
- Night Convoy (1932), as Mario Orbeliani
- Stalingradskaya bitva I (1949), as Gen. Paulus
- Stalingradskaya bitva II (1949), as Gen. Paulus
- Geroite na Shipka (as V. Gajdarov) (1955)
- Bare et liv - historien om Fridtjof Nansen (1968)

== See also ==
- Ossip Runitsch
- Ivan Mozzhukhin
- Vitold Polonsky
