= Decarli =

Decarli is an Italian surname. Notable people with the name include the following:

- Bruno Decarli (1877–1950), German actor
- Saulo Decarli (born 1992), Swiss footballer
