= The Man Who Sold Himself =

The Man Who Sold Himself may refer to:

- The Man Who Sold Himself (album), a 2012 album by Gavin Harrison and 05Ric
- The Man Who Sold Himself (1925 film), a German silent film
- The Man Who Sold Himself (1959 film), a West German crime film
