= The Phantom Gondola =

1936 film directed by Augusto Genina

- Directed by: Augusto Genina
- Written by: Maurice Dekobra (novel); Gino Valori
- Starring: Marcelle Chantal; Henri Rollan; Paul Bernard; Roger Karl
- Cinematography: Anchise Brizzi; Léonce-Henri Burel
- Edited by: Fernando Tropea
- Music by: Cesare A. Bixio; Ezio Carabella; Armando Fragna
- Production companies: Hélianthe-Film; Tiberia Film
- Distributed by: Grandi Film (Italy)
- Release date: March 1936
- Running time: 85 minutes
- Countries: France; Italy
- Language: Italian

The Phantom Gondola (Italian: La gondola delle chimere) is a 1936 French-Italian drama film directed by Augusto Genina and starring Marcelle Chantal, Henri Rollan and Paul Bernard. The film was a co-production between the two countries shot at the Cines Studios in Rome and based on a 1926 novel by Maurice Dekobra.

== Synopsis ==
A British aristocrat falls in love with a Venetian Count, without realising that he is a spy against the Turks. When she discovers that he has been captured by the notorious Sélim Pacha she does everything she can to save him.

== Cast ==
- Marcelle Chantal as Lady Diana Wyndham
- Henri Rollan as Le comte Angelo Ruzzi / Il conte Angelo Ruzzi
- Paul Bernard as Jimmy
- Roger Karl as Sélim Pacha / Selim Pascia
- Betty Beckers as Belkis
- Serge Nadaud as Sir Reginald Duckling
- Edmond Van Daële as Le docteur Erich Krauss / Il dottor Erick Krauss
- Alexandre Mihalesco as Ibrahim
- Lucie Gueneau as Madame Sacchardi / Signora Saccardi
- Doris Duranti as Nelly
- Jean Del Val as Monsieur de Montignac
- Paul Clerget as Le diplomate / Il diplomato
- Hugues de Bagratide as Le prince Ahmed / Il principe Achmed
- Jean Clarens as Le capitaine / Il capitano
- Emilienne Davray as La téléphoniste
- Nino Eller
- Mario Falaschi
- Giovanni Ferrari
- Renato Gabrielli
- Carlo Maggio
- Lia Rosa
- Vanna Vanni
- Rosina Adrario

== Reception ==
Writing for The Spectator in 1936, Graham Greene gave the film a poor review, characterizing it as "a cheap, trivial and pretentious story by a popular writer of rather low reputation." While acknowledging that "it is one of the only two films this last year I have found myself unable to endure till the end," and that he had not therefore completed the entire film, Greene explained his action "for never has a melodrama proceeded so slowly, with such a saga-like tread".

== See also ==
- Change of Heart (1928), with Juliette Compton as Lady Winham
- Madonna of the Sleeping Cars (1928), with Claude France as Lady Diana Wynham
- Madonna of the Sleeping Cars (1955), with Gisèle Pascal as Lady Diana Wyndham

== Bibliography ==
- Nowell-Smith, Geoffrey & Hay, James & Volpi, Gianni. The Companion to Italian Cinema. Cassell, 1996.
