= The Ways of Love Are Strange =

The Ways of Love Are Strange may refer to:

- The Ways of Love Are Strange (1927 film), a German silent romantic drama film
- The Ways of Love Are Strange (1937 film), a German drama film
