= Connard =

Connard is a surname. Notable people with the surname include:

- Geoffrey Connard (1925–2013), Australian politician
- Leo Connard (1860–after 1928), Austrian actor
- Philip Connard (1875–1958), British artist

== See also ==
- Connare
