= Change of Heart (1928 film) =

1928 film

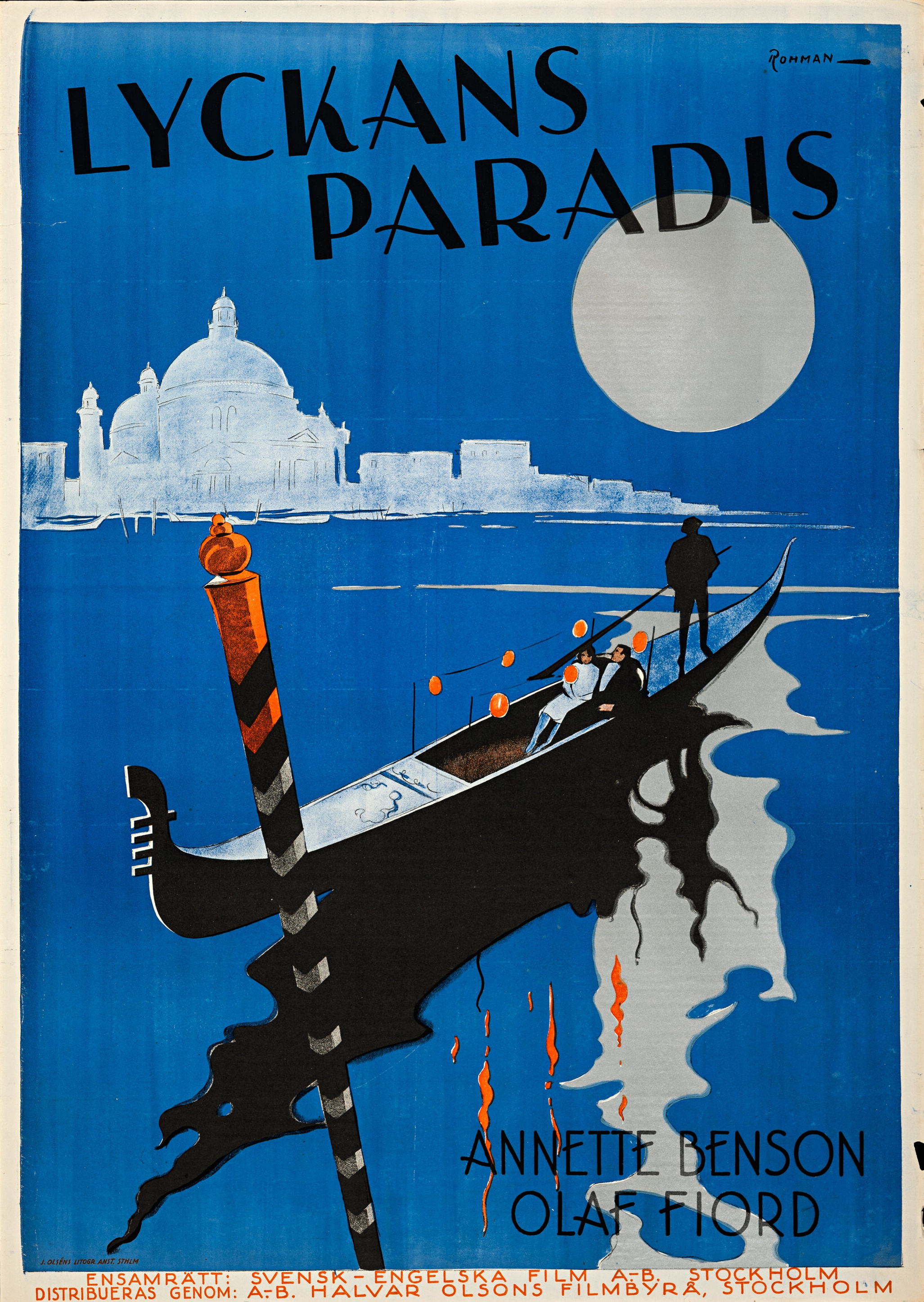
- Swedish theatrical release poster
- Directed by: Marco de Gastyne
- Written by: Maurice Dekobra (novel)
- Starring: Philippe Hériat; Annette Benson; Olaf Fjord
- Cinematography: Gaston Brun; Paul Parguel
- Production company: Pathé-Natan
- Release date: 2 March 1928
- Country: France
- Languages: Silent; French intertitles

Change of Heart (French: Mon coeur au ralenti) is a 1928 French silent drama film directed by Marco de Gastyne and starring Philippe Hériat, Annette Benson and Olaf Fjord. It is based on the novel Mon coeur au ralenti by the French writer Maurice Dekobra.

== Cast ==
In alphabetical order

- Annette Benson as Griselda Turner
- Juliette Compton as Lady Diana Wynham
- Olaf Fjord as Prince Seliman
- Philippe Hériat as Comte Alfierini
- Choura Milena as Evelyn Turner
- Gaston Modot as Chapinsky
- Georges Paulais as Yarichkine
- Varvara Yanova as Billie Swanson

== See also ==
- Madonna of the Sleeping Cars (1928), with Claude France as Lady Diana Wynham and Olaf Fjord as Prince Seliman
- The Phantom Gondola (1936), with Marcelle Chantal as Lady Diana Wyndham
- Madonna of the Sleeping Cars (1955), with Gisèle Pascal as Lady Diana Wyndham

== Bibliography ==
- Goble, Alan. The Complete Index to Literary Sources in Film. Walter de Gruyter, 1999.
