= Ruth Werner =

Ruth Werner may refer to:

- Helga Molander (1896–1986), German actress, born Ruth Werner
- Ursula Kuczynski (1907–2000), German writer and spy, also known as Ruth Werner
