= Henriette Jacoby =

- Directed by: Richard Oswald
- Written by: Georg Hermann (novel); Richard Oswald
- Starring: Mechthildis Thein; Conrad Veidt; Leo Connard
- Cinematography: Max Fassbender
- Production company: Richard-Oswald-Produktion
- Release date: 13 December 1918
- Country: Germany
- Languages: Silent; German intertitles

Henriette Jacoby is a 1918 German silent film directed by Richard Oswald and starring Mechthildis Thein, Conrad Veidt and Leo Connard. It is the sequel to Jettchen Gebert's Story. It is a lost film.

== Cast ==
- Mechthildis Thein as Jettchen Gebert
- Conrad Veidt as Doktor Friedrich Köstling
- Leo Connard as Salomon Gebert
- Martin Kettner as Ferdinand Gebert
- Julius Spielmann as Jason Gebert
- Clementine Plessner as Rikchen
- Else Bäck as Hannchen
- Max Gülstorff as Onkel Eli
- Helene Rietz as Tante Minchen
- Robert Koppel as Julius Jakoby aus Bentschen
- Ilka Karen as Pinchen
- Hugo Döblin as Onkel Naphtali
- Fritz Richard

== Bibliography ==
- John T. Soister. Conrad Veidt on Screen: A Comprehensive Illustrated Filmography. McFarland, 2002.
