= Rasputin (1928 film) =

1928 film

Rasputin, The Prince of Sinners
- Theatrical film poster
- German: Dornenweg einer Fürstin
- Directed by: Nikolai Larin; Boris Nevolin
- Written by: Boris Nevolin; Nikolai Neboli; Irvin Shapiro
- Starring: Vladimir Gajdarov; Suzanne Delmas; Ernst Rückert
- Cinematography: Emil Schünemann
- Production companies: Memento Film-Fabrik; Vertrieb
- Distributed by: Süd film
- Release date: 12 November 1928
- Running time: 87 minutes
- Countries: Germany; Soviet Union
- Languages: Silent; German intertitles

Rasputin, The Prince of Sinners (German: Dornenweg einer Fürstin), or simply Rasputin, is a 1928 German-Soviet drama film co-directed by Nikolai Larin and Boris Nevolin and starring Vladimir Gajdarov, Suzanne Delmas and Ernst Rückert. The film's poster showed the tagline "rysslands onda ande", which translates as "Russia's Evil Spirit". It was shot at the Johannisthal Studios in Berlin. The film's sets were designed by Carl Ludwig Kirmse. This film is sometimes confused with another 1928 German silent film made about Rasputin called Rasputin, the Holy Sinner.

This being the only known German-Russian co-production ever done about Rasputin, the filmmakers were able to shoot the film at or near the historical places where the real life incidents portrayed actually occurred. In 1928, Russian authorities were interested in showing Rasputin as the monster he really was, rather than try to elicit sympathy for the character. He is depicted as a sexually promiscuous alcoholic with abhorrent manners, similar to the manner in which Hammer Films later portrayed him in their 1966 Christopher Lee film, Rasputin the Mad Monk.

== Plot ==
The film is set during the tumultuous period of the 1917 Russian Revolution. As the old order crumbles, the bourgeoisie and aristocracy live in fear while Bolshevik marauders sweep through the land. Those members of the former ruling class who escape massacre attempt to flee to Western Europe. The film hints that much of this upheaval can be attributed to the actions of the mystic monk Rasputin, whose influence is shown in several key scenes.

Among the Russian exiles seeking a fresh start in Western Europe are two protagonists from vastly different social classes: Alexander Kolossow, a young student and former lieutenant who was arrested as a spy in St. Petersburg and sentenced to death, and Princess Ludmilla Voronzowa, a disgraced member of the nobility.

Alexander and Ludmilla share a past; they knew and respected each other during better times in St. Petersburg. Now, under entirely different circumstances, they meet again in Berlin—both impoverished but alive. Princess Ludmilla contemplates marrying a humble chauffeur named Radlow to secure her future. Meanwhile, Alexander works modestly as an employee in a confectionery and seeks to achieve what societal norms once forbade him: to win Ludmilla’s hand and heart.

In the freer society of Germany, the two overcome their class differences and ultimately marry, finding a new life together despite their shared hardships.

== Cast ==
- Gregori Chmara as Rasputin
- Vladimir Gajdarov as Alexander Kolossov
- Suzanne Delmas as Ludmilla Vorontsov
- Ernst Rückert as Leonid Vorontsov
- Fritz Alberti as Prince Vorontsov, Reichtsrats-Mitglied
- Hedwig Wangel as Princess Vorontsov
- Mary Kid as Tatiana Oblonskaya
- Hans Albers as Sergej Ordinsky, diplomat
- Anton Pointner as Peter Avdeev
- Günther Hadank as Radlow
- Lidiya Tridenskaya as Anissja, the cook
- Oreste Baldini as Mitensohn
- David Monko as Sokolsky - secretary
- Karl Platen as Sawely, the servant
