= Rasputin, the Holy Sinner =

1928 film

- American release poster
- German: Rasputins Liebesabenteuer
- Directed by: Martin Berger
- Written by: Dosio Koffler
- Produced by: Martin Berger
- Starring: Nikolai Malikoff; Diana Karenne; Erwin Kalser
- Cinematography: László Schäffer
- Music by: Pasquale Perris
- Production company: Martin Berger Film
- Distributed by: Mondial-Film
- Release date: 26 September 1928
- Running time: 60 minutes
- Country: Germany
- Languages: Silent; German intertitles

Rasputin, the Holy Sinner (German: Rasputins Liebesabenteuer) is a 1928 German silent film directed by Martin Berger and starring Nikolai Malikoff, Diana Karenne and Erwin Kalser. The film was also released as Rasputin, the Holy Devil and Rasputin's Amorous Adventures. Director Berger made Rasputin into a sympathetic peasant character who was "exploited by the boorish and overly pampered bourgeoisie".

The film was one of Berger's biggest productions according to its budget and boasted a distinguished cast, including Alfred Abel and Max Schreck. Russian-born actor Nikolai Malikoff received glowing reviews for his portrayal of Rasputin, although his film career petered out soon after due to the advent of sound. (This film is sometimes confused with a 1928 German-Russian film called Rasputin (1928 film).)

== Plot ==
A simple Russian peasant named Gregori Rasputin seems able to perform miracles and soon comes to the attention of the Tsar and Tsarina of the Russian royal family who elevate him to the rank of spiritual advisor. Rasputin's control over them grows, and members of the hierarchy fear he is trying to increase his own political power. They develop a plot to assassinate Rasputin.

== Cast ==
- Nikolai Malikoff as Rasputin
- Diana Karenne as Czarina
- Erwin Kalser as Czar
- Alexander Murski as Postmaster Globitscheff
- Nathalie Lissenko as Frau Tatarinoff
- Albert Kergy as Adjutant Bilinski
- Alfred Abel as General adjutant Sablin
- Mikhail Rasumny as Purishkevich
- Hilde Hildebrand as Dirne Gregubowa
- David Monko as Minister Sazonov
- Camilla von Hollay as Maid Dunja
- Ferdinand Bonn as Egorov
- Max Schreck as Nikolai Nikolaevich
- Uli Buotry as Militza Nikolaevich
- Jack Trevor as Prince Yusupov
- Hans Albers as officer
- Hermann Picha as informer
- Fritz Alberti as Colonel Tatarinov
- Ruth Albu as Hoffräulein Wera
- Gertrud Arnold as Mother Bilinski
- Erna Bojar as Gymnasist
- Maria De Witt as Wyrubowa
- Diana Dierks as Count Ignatyev
- N. Schweidel as Minister Chwostoff
- Alexandra Sorina as actress Warwarowa
- Uli Tridenskaja as Frau Globitscheff
- Martin Wolfgang as Mitja
