= Heilige oder Dirne =

1929 film

- Directed by: Martin Berger
- Written by: Georges Ohnet (play); Herbert Rosenfeld
- Produced by: Martin Berger
- Starring: María Corda; Vladimir Gajdarov; Hans Adalbert Schlettow
- Cinematography: Carl Drews
- Production company: Martin Berger Film
- Distributed by: Mondial-Film
- Release date: 1 October 1929
- Country: Germany
- Languages: Silent; German intertitles

Heilige oder Dirne is a 1929 German silent film directed by Martin Berger and starring María Corda, Vladimir Gajdarov and Hans Adalbert Schlettow.

The film's sets were designed by Otto Guelstorff.

== Cast ==
- Marcel Vibert as Raoul
- Hilde von Stolz as Therese
- María Corda as Lydia, Thereses Freundin
- Gertrud Eysoldt as Raouls Mutter
- Hans Adalbert Schlettow as Gonsalez, Plantagenbesitzer
- Lee Abère as Gonsalezs Frau
- Hans Albers as Varnesi
- Paul Otto as Dr. Abrisni, Bankier
- Mikhail Rasumny
- Erika Dannhoff
- Vladimir Gajdarov

== Bibliography ==
- Michaela Krützen. Hans Albers: eine deutsche Karriere. Beltz Quadriga, 1995.
