= When the Guard Marches =

1928 film

- Directed by: Hans Steinhoff
- Written by: Victor Abel; Paul Martin; Karl Ritter
- Starring: Claire Rommer; Fred Solm; Wera Engels
- Cinematography: Axel Graatkjær; Alfred Hansen
- Production company: Olympia Film
- Distributed by: Süd-Film
- Release date: 19 April 1928
- Running time: 78 minutes
- Country: Germany
- Languages: Silent; German intertitles

When the Guard Marches or The Girl from The Spree Woods (German: Das Spreewaldmädel) is a 1928 German silent comedy film directed by Hans Steinhoff and starring Claire Rommer, Fred Solm and Wera Engels.

The film's sets were designed by the art director Heinrich Richter.

== Cast ==
In alphabetical order

- Teddy Bill
- Wilhelm Diegelmann
- Wera Engels
- Ivan Koval-Samborsky
- Alfred Loretto
- Eugen Neufeld
- Sophie Pagay
- Claire Rommer
- Fred Solm
- Jakob Tiedtke
- Truus Van Aalten

== Bibliography ==
- Gerhard Lamprecht. Deutsche Stummfilme: 1927-1931.
