= Mikhail Rasumny =

Soviet and American film actor

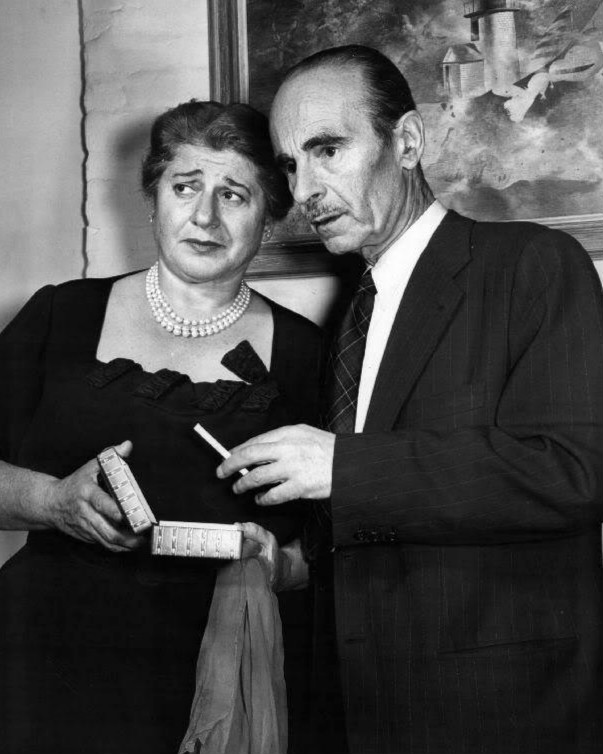
- Rasumny and Gertrude Berg in "Hearts and Hollywood" on The Elgin Hour, 1954.
- Born: Mikhail Razumnyy; May 13, 1884; Odessa, Russian Empire
- Died: February 17, 1956 (aged 71); Woodland Hills, California, U.S.
- Occupations: Television, film actor
- Years active: 1928-1956
- Spouse: Maria Schunzel (m. 1947)

Mikhail Rasumny (May 13, 1884 – February 17, 1956) was a Soviet and American film actor.

== Biography ==
Rasumny was born in Odessa, son of the famous cantor Ephraim Zalman (Solomon) Razumny, who was chief cantor of the choral synagogues in Kishinev, Nikolayev and Odessa. After his father's death in 1905, he moved to Saint Petersburg, where he began his theatrical career. He later moved to Moscow and emigrated to Berlin in 1927. In 1933, he opened in Paris a Yiddish revue theater "Der kundes" and in 1934 another Yiddish company, "Parizer Azazel". In 1938 in New York, he opened the Yidishe dramatishe studie (Yiddish Dramatic Studio).

Rasumny married late in life, to Maria Schunzel, in 1947.

== Filmography ==
Year	Title	Role	Notes
1928	The First Kiss	Ein Hoteldirektor & Harry, Peters Chauffeur	
1928	Rasputin, the Holy Sinner	Purischkewitsch	
1929	Die Abenteurer G.m.b.H.		
1929	Mascottchen	Max, Painter	
1929	Diana		
1929	The Smuggler's Bride of Mallorca	Taschendieb Cambero	
1929	Heilige oder Dirne		
1930	It Happens Every Day		
1930	Das alte Lied		
1940	Comrade X	arresting Russian officer	
1941	One Night in Lisbon	Restaurant Manager	Uncredited
1941	Forced Landing	Christmas	
1941	Hold Back the Dawn	the mechanic	
1941	The Shanghai Gesture	The Appraiser	
1942	Yokel Boy	Amatoff	
1942	This Gun for Hire	Slukey	
1942	Are Husbands Necessary?	Pierre	Uncredited
1942	Wake Island	Ivan Probenzky	
1942	Road to Morocco	Ahmed Fey	
1943	For Whom the Bell Tolls	Rafael, the gypsy	with Ingrid Bergman and Gary Cooper
1943	Hostages	Joseph	Uncredited
1944	And the Angels Sing	Schultz	
1944	Henry Aldrich Plays Cupid	Konrad	Uncredited
1944	Practically Yours	LaCrosse	
1945	A Royal Scandal	Drunken General	
1945	A Medal for Benny	Raphael Catalina	
1945	The Unseen	Chester	
1945	Masquerade in Mexico	Paolo	
1945	The Stork Club	Mr. Coretti	
1946	Heartbeat	aspiring pickpocket Yves Cadubert	
1946	Our Hearts Were Growing Up	Bubchenko	
1946	Anna and the King of Siam	Alak	
1946	Holiday in Mexico	Baranga	
1946	Blue Skies	François	
1947	Variety Girl	Mikhail Rasumny	Uncredited
1947	Her Husband's Affairs	muddled inventor Emil Ginka	
1947	Pirates of Monterey	Sergeant Pio	
1948	Song of My Heart	Sergei Ivanov / Stephen Ivanov	
1948	Saigon	Hotel Clerk	
1948	The Kissing Bandit	Don Jose	
1949	Free for All	Dr. Axel Torgelson	
1949	The Pirates of Capri	Pepino	
1950	Hit Parade of 1951	The Professor	
1952	Anything Can Happen	Tariel Godiedze	
1953	Tonight We Sing	Nicolai	
1953	The Stars Are Singing	Ladowski	
1956	Hot Blood	Old Johnny	(final film role)
