= Walter Slezak =

Austrian-born actor (1902–1983)

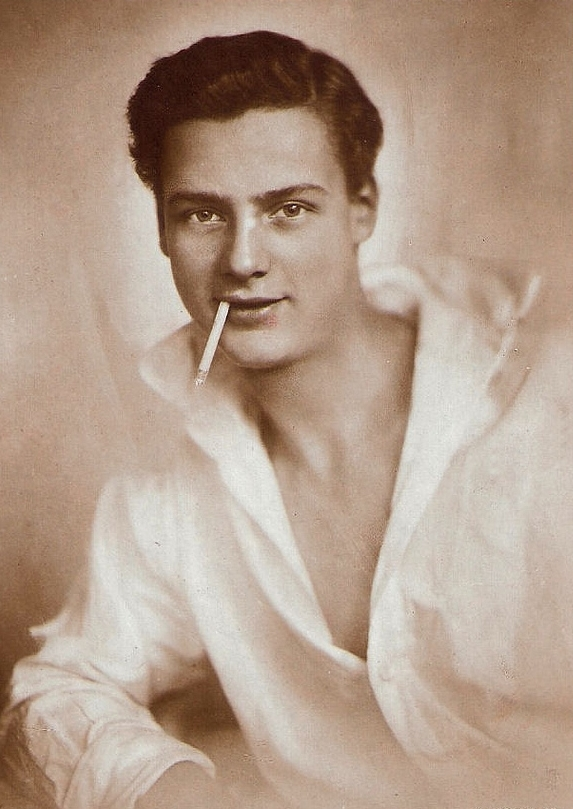
- Slezak c. 1922
- Born: 3 May 1902; Vienna, Austria-Hungary
- Died: 21 April 1983 (aged 80); Flower Hill, New York, U.S.
- Resting place: Rottach-Egern, Germany
- Occupation: Actor
- Years active: 1922–1980
- Spouse: Johanna Van Rijn (m. 1943)
- Children: 3, including Erika Slezak
- Father: Leo Slezak
- Relatives: Margarete Slezak (sister)
- Awards: Tony Award (1955)

Walter Slezak (German pronunciation: [ˌvaltɐ ˈslɛzak]; 3 May 1902 – 21 April 1983) was an Austrian-born film and stage actor active between 1922 and 1976. He mainly appeared in German films before migrating to the United States in 1930 and performing in numerous Hollywood productions.

Slezak typically portrayed wily and loquacious characters, often philosophical, and often with a taste for food, drink, and fine living. He played a crafty villain as a U-boat captain in Alfred Hitchcock's film Lifeboat (1944), a charming, two-timing major domo to a tycoon in Come September (1961), and a wandering gypsy in The Inspector General (1949). He stood out as shrewd, unscrupulous private investigators in film noir, as in Cornered (1945) and Born to Kill (1947).

== Early life ==
Slezak was born in Vienna, the son of opera tenor Leo Slezak and Elisabeth "Elsa" Wertheim. He studied medicine for a time and later worked as a bank teller. His older sister Margarete Slezak was also an actress.

== Career ==
Slezak was talked into taking his first role, in the 1922 Austrian film Sodom und Gomorrah, by his friend and the film's director, Michael Curtiz. In his youth (while still slim) Slezak was cast as a leading man in silent films. In 1924, he portrayed the title role in Carl Theodor Dreyer's homoerotic drama Michael (1924) after the novel of the same name by Herman Bang. He also acted on the stage for many years, debuting on Broadway in 1931. In the 1930s, he permanently moved to the United States.

His first American film was Once Upon a Honeymoon (1942), with Ginger Rogers and Cary Grant. He worked steadily and appeared in over 100 films including The Princess and the Pirate (1944), The Spanish Main (1945), Sinbad the Sailor (1947), Born to Kill (1947), Abbott and Costello in the Foreign Legion (1950), People Will Talk (1951), and Call Me Madam (1953).

Slezak played the lead in Broadway musicals, including Fanny, for which he won the Tony Award for Best Actor in a Musical.

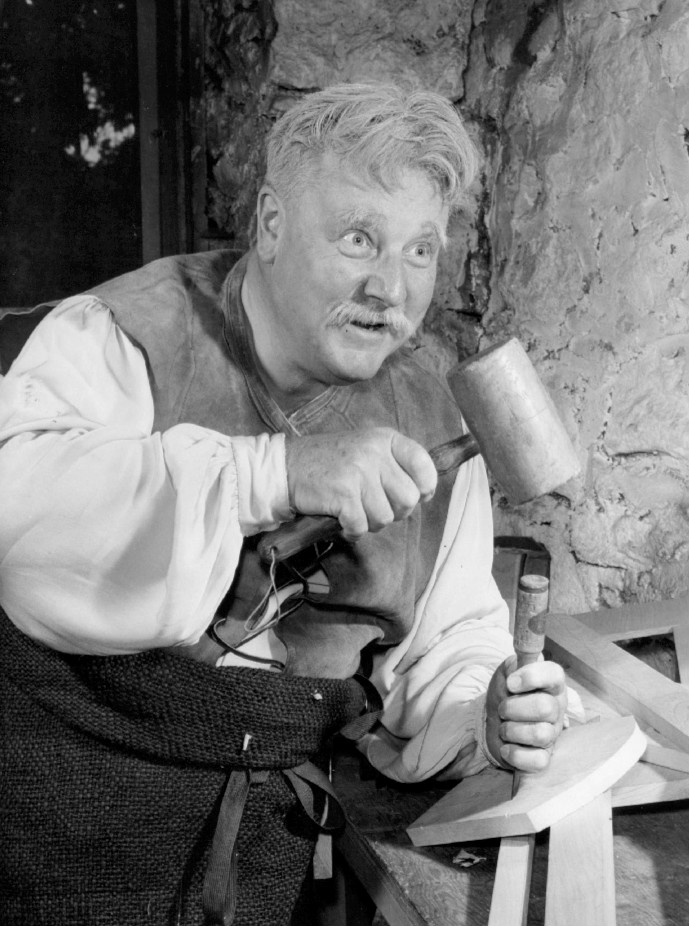
Slezak as Geppetto in the 1957 televised production of Pinocchio

Slezak acted in radio in such shows as Lux Radio Theater, Columbia Workshop, The Pepsodent Show, and The Charlie McCarthy Show. He made numerous television appearances, including in the programs The Loretta Young Show, This Is Show Business, Playhouse 90, and Studio One. He starred in an unsold television pilot, Slezak and Son, that aired in 1960 as an episode of the anthology series New Comedy Showcase, and appeared as The Clock King in episodes 45 and 46 of TV series Batman in 1966.

In 1959/60, Slezak appeared at the Metropolitan Opera in Johann Strauss's operetta Der Zigeunerbaron. In the 1970s, Slezak played the non-singing role of Frosch, the jailer, in the San Francisco Opera production of Johann Strauss's operetta Die Fledermaus. Later film roles in Britain included the Cliff Richard vehicle Wonderful Life (1964) and Black Beauty (1971).

== Personal life ==
Slezak married Johanna "Kaasi" Van Rijn on 10 October 1943. The couple had three children: Ingrid, Erika, and Leo. Erika went on to become an Emmy-winning actress, and starred as Victoria Lord on the long-running soap opera One Life to Live from 1971 to its cancellation in 2012. In 1974, Slezak appeared on the series as her character's godfather, Lazlo Braedecker.

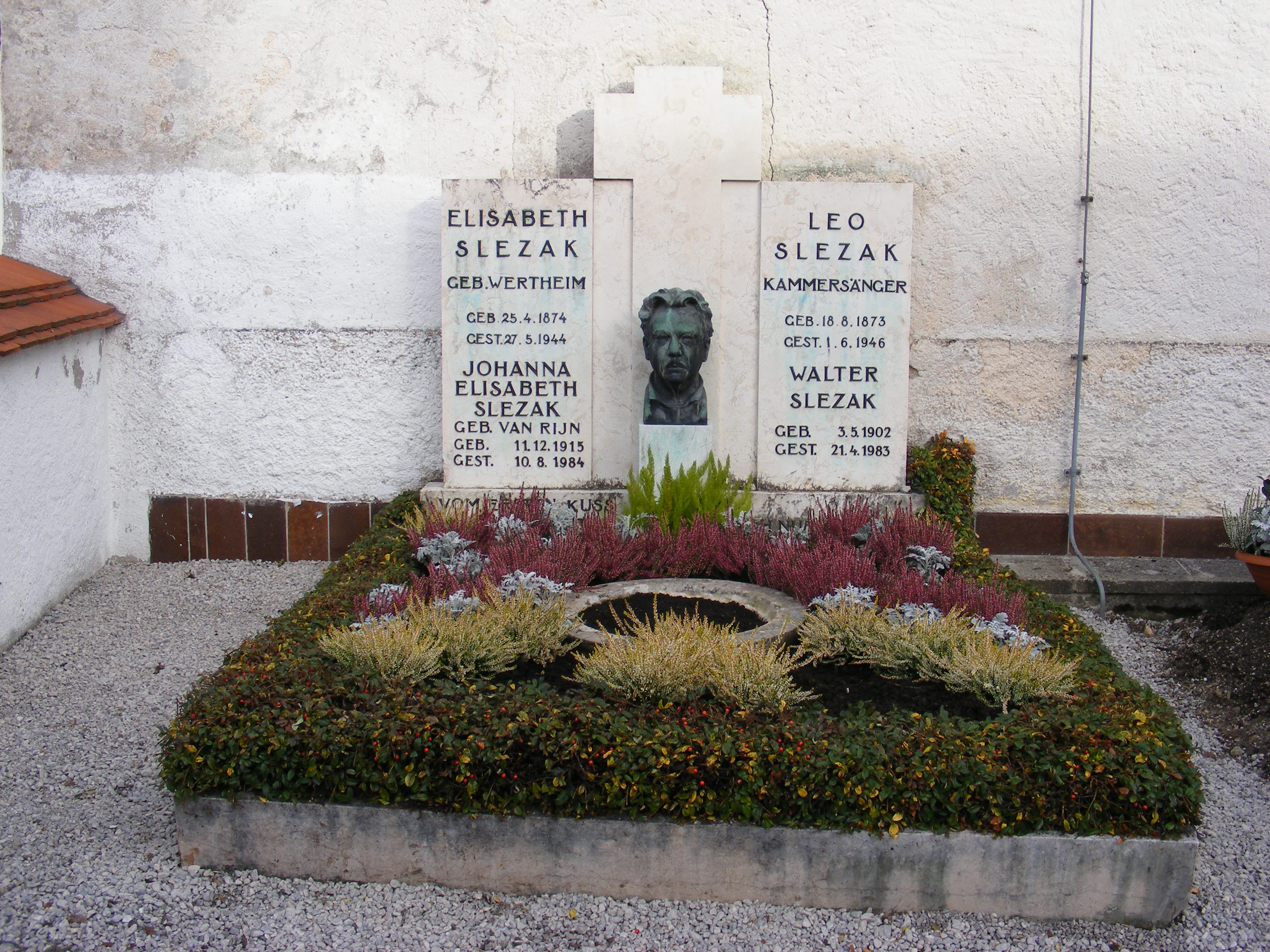
Gravesite of Slezak, his wife Johanna, and his parents Leo and Elisabeth in Egern, Bavaria

Slezak was close friends in Vienna in the 1930s with heiress Maria Altmann and her family.

== Death ==
On 21 April 1983, Slezak died from a self-inflicted gunshot. He was reportedly despondent over the state of his health, most notably heart trouble, a recent prostate operation, and a shoulder injury requiring several treatments a week. He was buried in the grave of his parents in the cemetery of St. Laurentius Church, a Catholic parish in Egern, Bavaria.

== Autobiography ==
Slezak's autobiography, What Time's the Next Swan? was published in 1962. The book's title refers to an alleged incident in the career of his father, heldentenor Leo Slezak. During a performance in the title role of Lohengrin, the elder Slezak was supposed to finish his aria by stepping into a swan boat and then being pulled offstage. When a stagehand removed the boat prematurely, Slezak supposedly reacted to the error by asking the audience "What time's the next swan?"

== Awards ==
In 1955, Slezak won a Tony Award for his role in the Broadway production of Fanny.

== Complete filmography ==
Year	Film	Role	Notes
1922	Sodom and Gomorrah	Eduard Harber / Goldsmith	
1924	Michael	Michael	
1924	My Leopold	Leopold	
1925	Oh Those Glorious Old Student Days		
1925	Sumpf und Moral		
1926	Give My Regards to the Blonde Child on the Rhine		
1926	Watch on the Rhine	Walter Thiermann	
1926	Marccos tollste Wette		
1926	Young Blood	Oberprimaner	
1926	The Sea Cadet		
1927	Wie bleibe ich jung und schön - Ehegeheimnisse		
1927	Goodbye Youth	Mario	
1927	The Right to Live		
1927	The Lorelei		
1927	The Ways of Love Are Strange	Florizel	
1927	The Long Intermission	Ottokar	
1927	The Standard-Bearer of Sedan		
1928	Single Mother		
1928	Almenrausch and Edelweiss	Mentel	
1928	Das Hannerl von Rolandsbogen		
1929	Osudné noci	Bellini	
1929	Eros in Chains	Heinz Ewer	
1932	Spies at the Savoy Hotel	Kurt	
1942	Once Upon a Honeymoon	Baron Franz von Luber	
1943	This Land Is Mine	Major Erich von Keller	
1943	The Fallen Sparrow	Dr. Christian Skaas	
1944	Lifeboat	Willi	
1944	Step Lively	Joe Gribble	
1944	Till We Meet Again	Vitrey, The Mayor	
1944	The Princess and the Pirate	La Roche	
1945	Salome, Where She Danced	Dimitrioff	
1945	The Spanish Main	Don Juan Alvarado	
1945	Cornered	Melchior Incza	
1947	Sinbad the Sailor	Melik	
1947	Born to Kill	Arnett	
1947	Riffraff	Molinar	
1948	The Pirate	Don Pedro Vargas	
1949	The Inspector General	Yakov	
1950	The Yellow Cab Man	Dr. Byron Dokstedder	
1950	Spy Hunt	Doctor Stahl	
1950	Abbott and Costello in the Foreign Legion	Sgt. Axmann	
1951	Bedtime for Bonzo	Prof. Hans Neumann	
1951	People Will Talk	Prof. Barker	
1953	Confidentially Connie	Emil Spangenberg	
1953	Call Me Madam	August Tantinnin	
1953	White Witch Doctor	Huysman	
1954	The Steel Cage	Louis	
1956	The Good Fairy	Max Sporum	TV movie
1957	Ten Thousand Bedrooms	Papà Vittorio Martelli	
1957	Pinocchio	Geppetto	TV movie
1959	The Miracle	Flaco	
1959	A Doll's House	Presenter	TV movie
1959	A Christmas Festival	Mr. Really-Big	TV movie
1961	Come September	Maurice Clavell	
1962	The Wonderful World of the Brothers Grimm	Stossel	
1963	A Cry of Angels	George Frideric Handel	TV movie
1964	Wonderful Life	Lloyd Davis	
1964	Emil and the Detectives	Baron	
1965	The Man Who Bought Paradise	Captain Meers	TV movie
1965	24 Hours to Kill	Malouf	
1965	A Very Special Favor	Etienne	
1966	Congress of Love	Museum Guide	
1966	Dr. Coppelius	Dr. Coppelius	
1966	Batman	Clock King	
1967	The Caper of the Golden Bulls	Antonio Gonzalez	
1968	Heidi	Father Richter	TV movie
1970	The Juggler of Notre Dame	The Innkeeper	
1971	Black Beauty	Hackenschmidt	
1972	Treasure Island	Squire Trelawney	
1976	The Mysterious House of Dr. C	Dr. Coppelius	
