= Apaches of Paris =

1927 film

- Directed by: Nikolai Malikoff
- Written by: Francis Carco (novel); Serge Plaute; Robert Reinert
- Produced by: Marcel L'Herbier; Simon Schiffrin
- Starring: Jaque Catelain; Charles Vanel
- Cinematography: Roger Hubert; Jules Kruger; Nikolai Toporkoff
- Music by: Giuseppe Becce
- Production companies: ACE; UFA
- Distributed by: UFA
- Release date: 17 December 1927
- Running time: 112 minutes
- Countries: Germany; France
- Languages: Silent; German intertitles

Apaches of Paris (German: Die Apachen von Paris, French: Paname n'est pas Paris) is a 1927 French-German silent film directed by Nikolai Malikoff and starring Jaque Catelain and Charles Vanel.

It was shot at the Tempelhof Studios in Berlin and on location in Paris. The film's art direction was by Claude Autant-Lara and Vladimir Meingard. It premiered at the Gloria-Palast in Berlin.

== Cast ==
- Jaque Catelain as Mylord
- Charles Vanel as Bécot
- Bondy as La Noise
- Maude de la Vault
- Lia Eibenschütz as Winnie
- Olga Limburg as Gertrude
- Nikolai Malikoff as John Rumple
- Jean-François Martial
- Konstantin Mic as Polka
- Jakob Tiedtke as Racken
- Ruth Weyher as Savonette

== Bibliography ==
- Goble, Alan (1999). The Complete Index to Literary Sources in Film. Walter de Gruyter. ISBN 978-3-11-095194-3.
