= The Salamander Ruby =

- Directed by: Rudolf Biebrach
- Written by: Paul Lindau (novel Die Brüder); Irene Daland; Carl Froelich
- Produced by: Oskar Messter
- Starring: Bruno Decarli; Mechthildis Thein; Hugo Flink
- Music by: Giuseppe Becce
- Production company: Messter Film
- Distributed by: UFA
- Release date: June 1918
- Country: Germany
- Languages: Silent; German intertitles

The Salamander Ruby (German: Der Rubin-Salamander) is a 1918 German silent drama film directed by Rudolf Biebrach and starring Bruno Decarli, Mechthildis Thein and Hugo Flink.

== Cast ==
- Bruno Decarli as Martin Hellberg
- Mechthildis Thein as Nelly Sand, Operettensängerin
- Hugo Flink as Templin, reicher Börsianer
- Heinrich Schroth as Attenhofer, Landstreicher
- Rudolf Biebrach as Landgerichtsrat Gottfried Hellberg
- Richard Wirth as Juwelier Ottrot
- Gertrude Hoffman as Freundin der Nelly Sand

== Bibliography ==
- Hans-Michael Bock & Michael Töteberg. Das Ufa-Buch. Zweitausendeins, 1992.
