= Her Husband's Affairs =

1947 film by S. Sylvan Simon

- Theatrical release poster
- Directed by: S. Sylvan Simon
- Screenplay by: Ben Hecht; Charles Lederer
- Produced by: Raphael Hakim
- Starring: Lucille Ball; Franchot Tone; Edward Everett Horton; Mikhail Rasumny; Gene Lockhart
- Cinematography: Charles Lawton Jr.
- Edited by: Al Clark
- Music by: George Duning
- Production company: Cornell Pictures
- Distributed by: Columbia Pictures
- Release date: November 12, 1947 (United States)
- Running time: 85 minutes
- Country: United States
- Language: English
- Box office: $1.5 million

Her Husband's Affairs is a 1947 American romantic comedy film directed by S. Sylvan Simon and starring Lucille Ball, Franchot Tone and Edward Everett Horton. It was released by Columbia Pictures.

== Plot ==
Harebrained schemes keep interrupting the honeymoon plans of newlyweds Bill and Margaret Weldon. The schemes are his: Bill constantly backs an eccentric inventor who comes up with a magical hair-growing formula and one that turns flowers into stone. Circumstances conspire to make it appear that Bill has murdered the inventor, but in the courtroom he spends more time promoting his wild ideas than he does defending his life. Margaret's testimony saves her husband, after which he continues to demand that she quit meddling in his affairs.

== Cast ==
- Lucille Ball as Margaret Weldon
- Franchot Tone as William Weldon
- Edward Everett Horton as J.B. Cruikshank
- Mikhail Rasumny as Prof. Emil Glinka
- Gene Lockhart as Peter Winterbottom
- Nana Bryant as Mrs. Winterbottom
- Jonathan Hale as Gov. Fox
- Paul Stanton as Dr. Frazee
- Mabel Paige as Mrs. Josper

== Reception ==
The snippet-review for Blockbuster reads, "Pleasant comedy owes screwy bounce to Ball."
