= Die Arche =

1919 film

- Directed by: Richard Oswald
- Written by: Robert Liebmann; Richard Oswald; Werner Scheff
- Starring: Leo Connard; Eva Speyer
- Cinematography: Karl Freund
- Production company: Richard-Oswald-Produktion
- Release date: 16 September 1919
- Running time: 70 minutes
- Country: Weimar Republic
- Languages: Silent film; German intertitles

Die Arche (The Ark) is a 1919 silent science fiction film starring Leo Connard and directed by Richard Oswald. It is a two-part German epic based upon a novel by Werner Scheff. It follows the story of a near future in which civilization has been destroyed.

== Cast ==
- Leo Connard as Ernst Pogge, Großreeder
- Eva Speyer as Helga, Ernsts Tochter
- Georg H. Schnell as Klaus Donken, Kapitän
- Oevid Molander as Walter Fahr, Ingenieur
- Eugen Klöpfer as Volkert, Steuermann
- Guido Herzfeld as Dr. Milius, Arzt
- Kissa von Sievers as Helgas Zofe
- Emil Lind as Keigo Soluma, Professor der Astronomie
