= Olaf Fjord =

Austrian actor, film director and film producer (1897–1945)

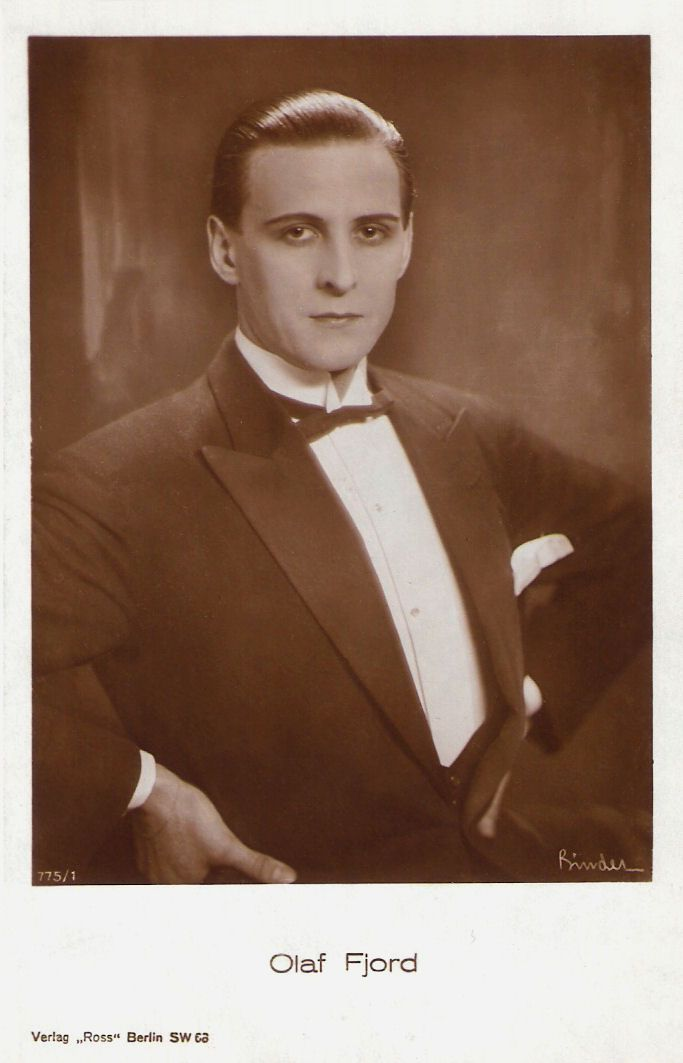
- Fjord c. 1922
- Born: Ämilian Maximilian Pouch; 3 August 1897; Graz, Austria-Hungary
- Died: 19 April 1945 (aged 47); Vienna, Nazi Germany
- Years active: 1917–1937

Olaf Fjord (born Ämilian Maximilian Pouch; 3 August 1897 – 19 April 1945) was an Austrian actor, film director and film producer.

== Selected filmography ==
- Der Herzog von Reichstadt (1920)
- Monna Vanna (1922)
- The Ragpicker of Paris (1922)
- Ludwig II (1922) title role
- The Path to God (1924)
- Two People (1924)
- The Stolen Professor (1924)
- The Most Beautiful Woman in the World (1924)
- The Man at Midnight (1924)
- Women Who Fall by the Wayside (1925)
- An Artist of Life (1925)
- Women of Luxury (1925)
- The Company Worth Millions (1925)
- Goetz von Berlichingen of the Iron Hand (1925)
- The Man Sold Himself (1925)
- Change of Heart (1928)
- Madonna of the Sleeping Cars (1928)
- Indizienbeweis (1929)
- The Third Confession (1929)
- Vendetta (1929)
- Erotikon (1929)
- Kamarádské manzelství (1930)
- Tarakanova (1930)
- 1914 (1931)
- Kennst Du das Land (1931)
- Cavaliers of the Kurfürstendamm (1932)
- Everything for a Woman (1935)

== Bibliography ==
- Kester, Bernadette. Film Front Weimar: Representations of the First World War in German films of the Weimar Period (1919-1933). Amsterdam University Press, 2003.
