= Battle of the Sexes (1926 film) =

1926 film

- Directed by: Heinrich Brandt
- Written by: Marie Luise Droop
- Starring: Aud Egede-Nissen; Paul Richter; Vladimir Gajdarov
- Cinematography: Leopold Kutzleb
- Production company: Eiko Film
- Distributed by: National Film
- Release date: 26 October 1926
- Country: Germany
- Languages: Silent; German intertitles

Battle of the Sexes (German: Kampf der Geschlechter) is a 1926 German silent comedy film directed by Heinrich Brandt and starring Aud Egede-Nissen, Paul Richter, and Vladimir Gajdarov.

The film's sets were designed by Max Knaake.

== Cast ==
- Aud Egede-Nissen as Renate
- Paul Richter as Graf Wartensleben
- Vladimir Gajdarov
- Margarete Lanner as Benita
- Angelo Ferrari
- Gertrud Arnold as Marquise
- Fritz Alberti

== Bibliography ==
- Krautz, Alfred (1984). International Directory of Cinematographers, Set- and Costume Designers in Film. Vol. 4. Munich: Saur. ISBN 978-3-598-21434-9.
