= Alfred Hansen (cinematographer) =

German cinematographer

- Born: 1885
- Died: January 1935 (aged 49–50); Berlin
- Occupation: Cinematographer
- Years active: 1917–1931 (film)

Alfred Hansen (1885–1935) was a German cinematographer of the silent and early sound era. He was known for his work in silent and early sound era cinematography.

== Selected filmography ==
- Carmen (1918)
- The Rosentopf Case (1918)
- Meyer from Berlin (1919)
- The Flame (1923)
- Three Waiting Maids (1925)
- If You Have an Aunt (1925)
- Athletes (1925)
- The Man Who Sold Himself (1925)
- Vienna - Berlin (1926)
- The Sea Cadet (1926)
- The Man Without Sleep (1926)
- The Trumpets are Blowing (1926)
- Give My Regards to the Blonde Child on the Rhine (1926)
- Nanette Makes Everything (1926)
- The White Spider (1927)
- Petronella (1927)
- The Tragedy of a Lost Soul (1927)
- The Lady and the Chauffeur (1928)
- When the Guard Marches (1928)
- The House Without Men (1928)
- Bobby, the Petrol Boy (1929)
- Flachsmann the Educator (1930)
- The Battle of Bademunde (1931)
- Errant Husbands (1931)
- Such a Greyhound (1931)

== Bibliography ==
- Raimondo-Souto, H. Mario (2006). Motion Picture Photography: A History, 1891–1960. Jefferson, NC: McFarland. ISBN 978-0-7864-2784-0.
