= Wochenspruch der NSDAP =

1937–1944 propaganda posters published by the Nazi Party

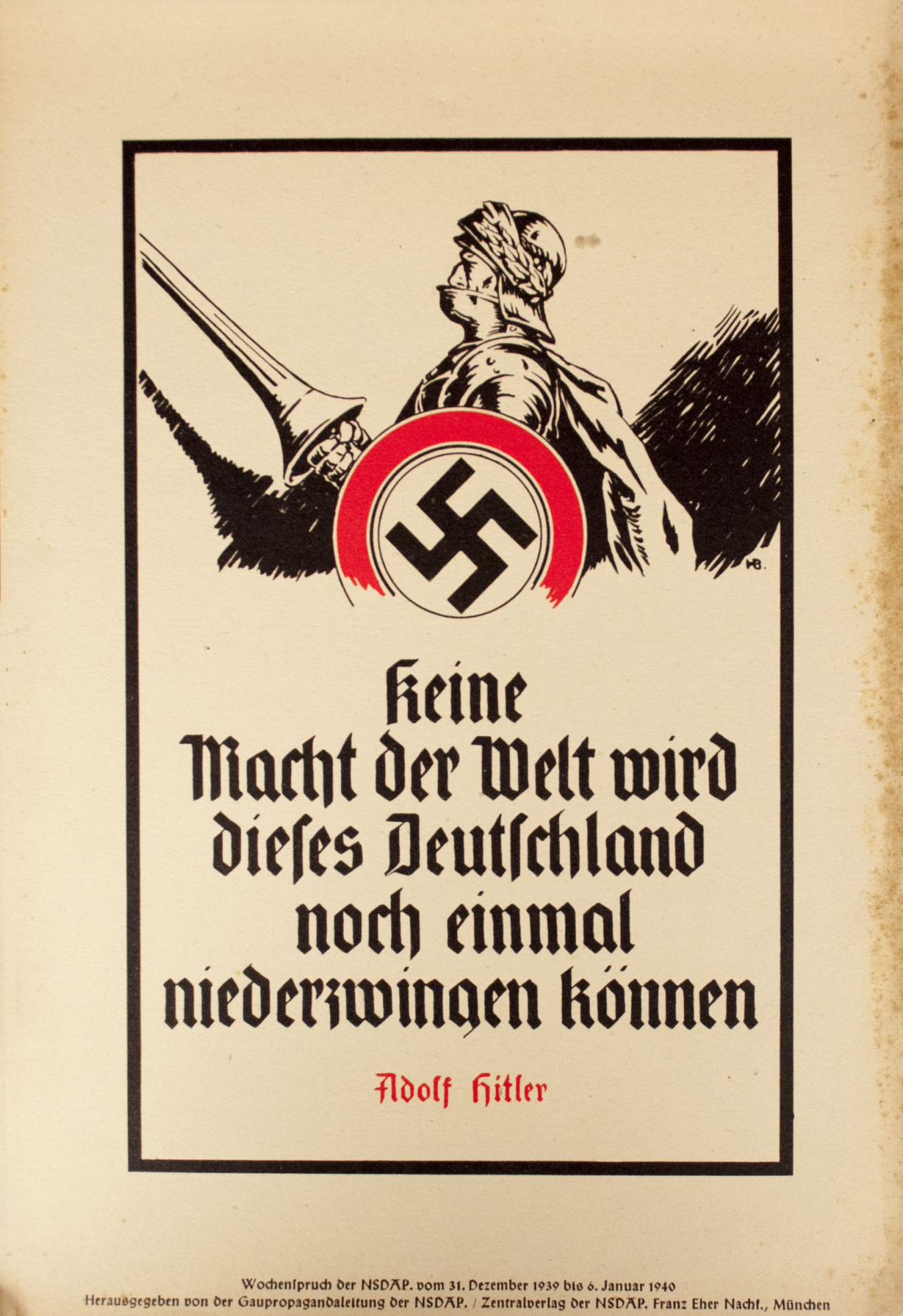
Poster from the 31 December 1939 edition of the Wochenspruch der NSDAP, containing the quote attributed to Adolf Hitler "This time, no power on earth will defeat Germany."

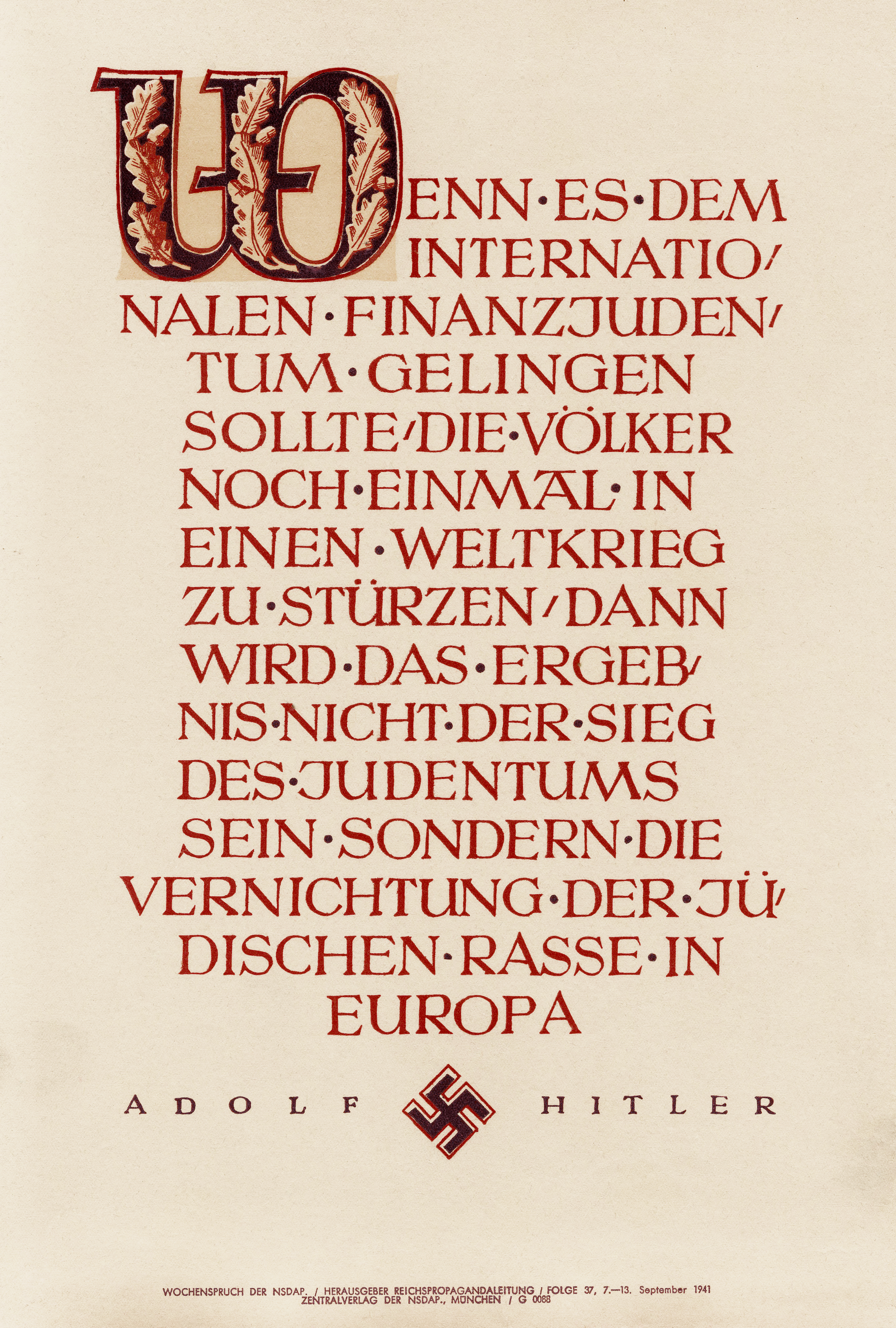
Poster displayed on 7–13 September 1941, quotes Hitler's speech on 30 January 1939. (The rendition omits "inside and outside Europe" and "the Bolshevization of the earth and thereby"...)

Wochenspruch der NSDAP (lit. 'Weekly Quotation of the Nazi Party') was a wall newspaper published by the Nazi Party between 1937 and 1944, displaying quotations, mostly from Nazi leaders. About 1,100 issues were published. Some were issued by the Reichspropagandaleitung and others by local party organizations in each Gau. Along with Nazi leaders, the posters also quoted famous Germans from history, including Friedrich Nietzsche, Ludwig van Beethoven, Carl von Clausewitz, Otto von Bismarck, and Friedrich Schiller. The posters were displayed in many public locations including town halls, restaurants, doctor's offices, offices, schools or companies. Historian Jeffrey Herf estimates that 32.5 million copies were printed in total from September 1939 to when the periodical was discontinued.

The purpose of the publication was to educate Germans about Nazi ideals and values, especially those who did not take advantage of the party's indoctrination sessions. Initially, they were often printed in Fraktur type, but this changed in later editions. Anti-Nazi diarist Friedrich Kellner noted that it was printed on high-quality paper despite shortages which necessitated rationing.

On 5 March 1939 — ten days before the German occupation of Bohemia and Moravia — the Wochenspruch quoted Heinrich von Kleist as saying, "As long as a single enemy defiantly resists in Germany, my duty is hatred and my virtue revenge!"
