= The Haunted Castle (1921 film) =

1921 film directed by F. W. Murnau

- German film poster
- Directed by: F. W. Murnau
- Screenplay by: Carl Mayer
- Based on: A novel by Rudolf Stratz
- Produced by: Erich Pommer
- Starring: Arnold Korff; Lulu Korff-Kyser; Lothar Mehnert; Paul Hartmann
- Cinematography: Fritz Arno Wagner; László Schäffer
- Production company: Uco-Film
- Distributed by: Decla-Bioscop AG
- Release date: 7 April 1921 (Berlin)
- Running time: 82 minutes
- Country: Germany

The Haunted Castle (1921) by F. W. Murnau

The Haunted Castle (German: Schloß Vogelöd, lit. 'Castle Vogelöd') is a 1921 silent mystery film directed by F. W. Murnau.

== Plot ==
A group of men gathers for a multi-day hunt at Castle Vogelöd, hosted by Lord von Vogelschrey, but torrential rain ruins their plans, and the guests while away their time inside the castle. Count Johann Oetsch, who was not invited, also arrives. He is shunned by the other hunters because he is rumoured to have shot his brother Peter several years earlier. This rumour is fuelled by a retired judge.

The brother's widow, the remarried Baroness Safferstätt, is also expected, making the situation awkward for the host. Count Oetsch ignores this and stays. The Baroness is horrified to see Count Oetsch upon her arrival and is determined to leave. However, the news of the arrival of Father Faramund, a relative of her former husband, stops her; she wants to confess to him.

In the following days, Count Oetsch accuses the Baron of murdering the Count's brother. In flashbacks, the Baroness confesses in stages that her first marriage was anything but harmonious. Her husband had become increasingly interested in religious pursuits rather than in her, so much so that, in the presence of Baron Safferstätt, a friend of her husband, she had wished for something "evil" to happen. The Baron had misunderstood her, leading him to shoot her husband. Their shared guilt ultimately led her and the Baron to marry, feeling nothing but emptiness for each other.

Father Faramund removes his false beard and his wig, revealing himself to be Count Oetsch in disguise. Her confession means he can now prove his innocence. Baron Safferstätt shoots himself. The real Father Faramund finally arrives at the castle.

== Cast ==
- Arnold Korff as Lord of the Castle von Vogelschrey
- Lulu Korff-Kyser as Centa von Vogelschrey
- Lothar Mehnert as Count Johann Oetsch
- Paul Hartmann as Count Peter Paul Oetsch
- Paul Bildt as Baron Safferstätt
- Olga Chekhova as Baroness Safferstätt
- Hermann Vallentin as Judge a. D.
- Julius Falkenstein as anxious gentleman
- Georg Zawatzky as kitchen boy
- Robert Leffler as majordomo
- Victor Blütner as Father Faramund
- Loni Nest as little girl
- Walter Kurt Kühle as servant

== Production and style ==
The Haunted Castle was adapted from a novel that Murnau biographer Lotte Eisner described as "semi-highbrow, semi-commercial" story by Rudolf Stratz published in Berliner Illustrirte Zeitung.

For The Haunted Castle, director F.W. Murnau often wrote in his script when and where scenes were shot. According to details given in the script owned by Robert Plumpe Murnau, The Haunted Castle was shot between 10 February and 2 March 1921, with two days taken just in building sets. These were designed by Hermann Warm, including the tableau of the castle's exterior and its surroundings, which is shown several times in the film. One of the most memorable scenes is that of an empty hall with Baroness and Baron Safferstätt on either side, symbolically representing the couple's emotional state.

Eisner noted the film is sometimes incorrectly described as a horror film, finding it influenced by Swedish films. A reviewer in Sight & Sound described it as "a drawing-room whodunit." Philip Kemp echoed this statement, calling it "not a supernatural story but a murder mystery."

== Release ==
The film premiered in Berlin at the Marmorhaus cinema on 7 April 1921. It is one of the earliest known surviving films by Murnau.

In 2002, the Friedrich Wilhelm Murnau Foundation produced a reconstruction of the film using an original negative from the German Federal Archives' film archive in Berlin and a tinted nitrate print with Portuguese intertitles from the Fundação Cinemateca Brasileira. The film has been released on DVD and Blu-ray as The Haunted Castle.

== Reception ==
In a contemporary review in Deutsche Lichtspiel-Zeitung, Alfred Rosenthal gave a positive review of the film and predicted it would fill cinemas. Another review in Der Kinematograph praised Murnau, observing that he "succeeded in expressing the inner life of the characters while foregoing external sensationism" and that the acting was "excellent", specifically praising Lothar Mehnert as Count Oetsch.

In retrospective reviews, a reviewer in Sight & Sound stated that "no one is ever going to rank this a major Murnau, but his oldest surviving film is worth watching for signs of his still-evolving language", noting the use of flashbacks and comedy elements. The reviewer also noted the appearance of Olga Chekhova as a highlight as it was "a decade before she became one of the Third Reich's biggest stars." Kemp gave a lukewarm review, finding the plot "conventional enough, but Murnau's inventive use of space is already evident."

== Bibliography ==
- Eisner, Lotte H. (1973) [1965]. Murnau. University of California Press.
- Kemp, Philip (November 2016). "Early Murnau: Five Films 1921-1925". Sight & Sound. Vol. 26, no. 11.
- "Schloss Vogelöd". Sight & Sound. Vol. 21, no. 10. October 2011.
- Stratz, Rudolf (1927). Schloß Vogelöd. Die Geschichte eines Geheimnisses [Castle Vogelöd. The Story of a Secret] (in German). Berlin: Vossische Buchhandlung.
- Stratz, Rudolf (2012). Schloß Vogelöd. Die Geschichte eines Geheimnisses [Castle Vogelöd. The Story of a Secret] (in German). Hamburg: Tredition Classics. ISBN 9783847267720.
- Workman, Christopher; Howarth, Troy (2016). Tome of Terror: Horror Films of the Silent Era. Midnight Marquee Press. ISBN 9781936168682.
