= Reichspropagandaleitung =

Nazi Party propaganda office

Reichspropagandaleitung (RPL)
- Formation: 30 June 1926
- Type: Nazi Party propaganda office
- Headquarters: Munich, later Berlin
- Reichspropagandaleiter: Gregor Strasser (1926–1928); Adolf Hitler (interim); Joseph Goebbels (1930–1945)
- Parent organization: NSDAP

The Reichspropagandaleitung or the RPL (in English: Reich Propaganda Directorate) was the central propaganda office of the NSDAP from 1926 to 1945, responsible for press, film, radio, and "Volksbildung" (people's education). Though closely linked to the Reich Ministry of Public Enlightenment and Propaganda (RMVP) after 1933, it remained a distinct party organ focused on internal Nazi party propaganda.

== Functions ==
The Reichspropagandaleiter (Reich Propaganda Leader) oversaw, coordinated, and standardized propaganda efforts across the NSDAP, its subsidiary organizations (e.g., SA, Hitler Youth), and affiliated associations. Key responsibilities included:

- Training party propagandists.
- Organizing rallies and public events.
- Managing the party’s radio broadcasts.

== History and structure ==
The RPL was established on June 30, 1926 after the NSDAP’s refoundation.

Key leaders included:

- Gregor Strasser (1926–1928), with Heinrich Himmler as deputy.
- Joseph Goebbels (1930–1945), who simultaneously led the RMVP after 1933.

The RPL operated through a hierarchical structure:

- Central Office (Munich/Berlin): Headed by a Chief of Staff (Stabsleiter) and Adjutant.
- Regional Offices: Regional Propaganda Leaders (Gaupropagandaleiter).
- Local Offices: District and Local Propaganda Leaders (Kreis- and Ortsgruppenpropagandaleiter ).

By 1941, it was reorganized into six departments:

1. Propaganda
2. Radio (led by August Staat)
3. Organizational Coordination
4. Film
5. Reich Motorcade "Deutschland" Culture (led by Karl Cerff)
6. Film Office

The Film Office (Act Film), led by Carl Neumann (1937–1941) and Arnold Raether, produced propaganda films and managed mobile cinema units. Notable works included:

- Gestern und heute (1938), contrasting Weimar "decadence" with Nazi achievements.
- Das Sowjet-Paradies (1942), an antisemitic documentary.

The office deployed 300 film trucks and two specialized trains to screen propaganda in rural areas lacking cinemas.

== Publications ==
The RPL oversaw the production of the "Wochenspruch der NSDAP" ("Weekly Quotation of the Nazi Party"), a wall newspaper published from 1937 to 1944. Approximately 1,100 issues were released, many distributed by the RPL or local Gau offices. Each poster displayed quotations from Nazi leaders (e.g., Hitler, Goebbels) and historical figures like Beethoven, Clausewitz, and Schiller, aiming to align German cultural heritage with Nazi ideology.

== Dissolution ==
The RPL was dissolved by the Allied Control Council under Control Council Law No. 2 on October 10, 1945, which banned Nazi organizations and confiscated their assets.

== See also ==
- Nazi propaganda
- Degenerate art (RPL co-produced the 1937 exhibition)
- Volksempfänger (Nazi mass-produced radio)
