= If You Have an Aunt =

1925 film directed by Carl Boese

- Directed by: Carl Boese
- Written by: Max Glass; Robert Misch (novella)
- Starring: Maly Delschaft; Wilhelm Diegelmann; Robert Garrison
- Cinematography: Alfred Hansen
- Music by: Willy Schmidt-Gentner
- Production company: Terra Film
- Distributed by: Terra Film
- Release date: 9 November 1925
- Country: Germany
- Languages: Silent; German intertitles

If You Have an Aunt (German: Wenn Du eine Tante hast) is a 1925 German silent film directed by Carl Boese and starring Maly Delschaft, Wilhelm Diegelmann and Robert Garrison.

The film's sets were designed by the art director Julius von Borsody.

== Cast ==
In alphabetical order

- Maly Delschaft as Trude
- Wilhelm Diegelmann as Franziskus Knoll
- Robert Garrison
- Bruno Kastner as Schauspieler
- Margarete Kupfer as Tante
- Helga Molander as Hildegard
- Hermann Picha as Rentier Kaltenbach
- Eugen Rex as Hermann

== Bibliography ==
- Grange, William. Cultural Chronicle of the Weimar Republic. Scarecrow Press, 2008.
