= The President (1928 film) =

1928 film

- Swedish poster
- Directed by: Gennaro Righelli
- Written by: Ludwig von Wohl (novel Der Präsident von Costa Nueva); Franz Schulz; Joseph Than
- Produced by: Herman Millakowsky
- Starring: Ivan Mozzhukhin; Nikolai Malikoff; Suzy Vernon
- Cinematography: Akos Farkas; Mutz Greenbaum
- Production company: Greenbaum-Film
- Distributed by: Deutsche Universal-Film
- Release date: 20 March 1928
- Country: Germany
- Languages: Silent; German intertitles

The President (German: Der Präsident) is a 1928 German silent drama film directed by Gennaro Righelli and starring Ivan Mozzhukhin, Nikolai Malikoff and Suzy Vernon. It was shot at the Staaken and EFA Studios in Berlin as well as on location in Nice on the French Riviera. The film's sets were designed by the art director Robert Neppach. It was distributed by the German branch of Universal Pictures.

== Cast ==
- Ivan Mozzhukhin as Chico / Pepe Torre, ein Bauer
- Nikolai Malikoff as Conde de Valdez
- Suzy Vernon as Donna Manuela, seine Tochter
- Luigi Serventi as Don Germo / Geronimo Cortez
- Heinrich Schroth as Deon Ramirez, ein Politiker
- Iwa Wanja as Jenetz / Juez, ein Bauernmädchen
- Rolf as The dog Mingo

== Bibliography ==
- Goble, Alan. The Complete Index to Literary Sources in Film. Walter de Gruyter, 1999.
