= The Third Confession =

1929 film directed by James Bauer

- Directed by: James Bauer
- Written by: Paul Rosenhayn
- Starring: Hertha von Walther; Olaf Fjord; Harry Nestor
- Cinematography: Giovanni Vitrotti
- Production company: Ines Internationale Spielfilm
- Distributed by: Biograph-Film
- Release date: 8 February 1929
- Country: Germany
- Languages: Silent; German intertitles

The Third Confession (German: Das Geständnis der Drei) is a 1929 German silent film directed by James Bauer and starring Hertha von Walther, Olaf Fjord and Harry Nestor.

The film's sets were designed by Robert A. Dietrich.

== Cast ==
- Hertha von Walther
- Olaf Fjord
- Harry Nestor
- Betty Astor
- Angelo Ferrari
- Franz Klebusch
- Gyula Szőreghy
- Manfred Voss

== Bibliography ==
- Gerhard Lamprecht. Deutsche Stummfilme: 1927-1931.
