= Fear (1917 film) =

- A shot of Conrad Veidt as the Indian priest holding the sacred statue
- Directed by: Robert Wiene
- Written by: Robert Wiene
- Produced by: Oskar Messter
- Starring: Bruno Decarli; Conrad Veidt; Bernhard Goetzke; Mechthildis Thein; Hermann Picha
- Production company: Messter Film
- Release date: September 1917
- Running time: 54 minutes
- Country: Germany
- Languages: Silent; German intertitles

Fear (German: Furcht) is a 1917 German silent horror film written and directed by Robert Wiene and starring Bruno Decarli, Conrad Veidt and Bernhard Goetzke.

The original soundtrack for the film was lost and replaced by another donated by collectionist Leslie Shepard. The sets were designed by Ludwig Kainer.

== Plot ==
Count Greven (Bruno de Carli) returns to his old castle after spending several years touring the world. The servants note how the count has changed: he is now withdrawn and fearful. He orders that the doors to the castle be kept locked and no one admitted. When he is left alone in his room, Greven opens a chest he brought from his travels, inside it there is a strange statue that he adds to his vast collection of rare works of art. Several days pass and a worried servant (Bernhard Goetzke) informs the town's minister (Hermann Picha) about his master's melancholia. The old man visits the castle looking to help. The count confesses the minister how, during his stay in India, he had heard of a statue of Buddha that was so beautiful that it made the sick well and the sad joyous; while visiting the temple, he stole the figure and smuggled it back home. The count tells the minister that the temple's priest swore a terrible revenge upon him for his sacrilege, and he has been living in fear of their secret powers ever since. The minister leaves shocked, believing that Greven has gone mad. The count screams in despair that he no longer wants to live, since the agony of suspense is worse than death.

One night, a turbaned figure does appear on Greven's grounds. The count demands that the Indian priest (Conrad Veidt) kills him right then and there to end his suffering, but the man refuses. He warns that - from that very day - the count will only have seven years to live life to its fullest, after which he will die by the hand of the one who loves him most. The count spends those years seeking out every joy life holds. He throws bacchanalias and hosts gambling parties, but soon these pleasures no longer satisfy him. Looking to obtain fame, Greven researches obsessively a means to cure world hunger, but after succeeding, he capriciously destroys it, all for his amusement. Still looking for fulfillment and meaning, he becomes involved with a young woman (Mechthildis Thein) and revels in the experience of love. He and the young woman are wed.

Nevertheless, as the fateful day approaches, he becomes paranoid and terrified once again. Desperate, he decides to leave his castle and travel around the world once again, however he can't depart from his wife and cancels his trip. Greven then takes the statue and throws it into a lake, hoping the curse of the priest goes away with it, only to find it back in his home right after. Trusting no one - he even suspects that will be his wife's hand that will slay him - he shoots himself. The statue is retrieved from Greven's castle and carried back to India in the hands of the mysterious priest.

== Cast ==
- Bruno Decarli as Count Greven
- Conrad Veidt as Indian Priest
- Bernhard Goetzke as Manservant
- Hermann Picha as The Minister
- Mechthildis Thein as Greven's Lover

== Reception ==
The film was well received by contemporary critics, who praised Wiene's interpretation of psychology and portrayal of paranoia.

== Availability ==
As with many of Wiene's lesser known works, Fear has not been released in any format for home media, making it an obscure and rare film. Nonetheless, a print of it is located at the Swedish Film Institute.

Although oldies.com released a bootleg version that was on DVD-R format and ran about an hour long. This version also includes the original soundtrack by Joseph Martin.

== Interpretation ==
Considerable ambiguity exists whether the Indian Priest is real or simply a product of the Count's fevered imagination due to his growing madness. Similar themes are explored in Wiene's later films, most notably in The Cabinet of Dr. Caligari.

== Bibliography ==
- Jung, Uli & Schatzberg, Walter. Beyond Caligari: The Films of Robert Wiene. Berghahn Books, 1999.
- John T. Soister. Conrad Veidt on Screen: A Comprehensive Illustrated Filmography. McFarland & Company Incorporated Pub, 2009.
- Flynn, Tom. 'Fear of Cultural Objects' in Sandis, Constantine, (Ed.) 'Cultural Heritage Ethics: Between Theory and Practice'. Open Book Publishers, Oxford, 2014.
