= The Three Mannequins =

1926 film

- Directed by: Jaap Speyer
- Written by: Max Glass
- Starring: Hans Albers; Anton Pointner; Paul Graetz
- Cinematography: Gustave Preiss
- Music by: Willy Schmidt-Gentner
- Production company: Terra Film
- Distributed by: Terra Film
- Release date: 7 August 1926
- Running time: 78 minutes
- Country: Germany
- Languages: Silent; German intertitles

The Three Mannequins (German: Die drei Mannequins) is a 1926 German silent film directed by Jaap Speyer and starring Hans Albers, Anton Pointner, and Paul Graetz. It was shot at the Terra Studios in Berlin. The film's sets were designed by the art director Hans Jacoby. It premiered at Berlin's Marmorhaus.

== Cast ==
- Hans Albers as Hochstapler
- Anton Pointner as Fred
- Paul Graetz as Lagerist Meyer
- Lydia Potechina as Frau Gold
- Kurt Gerron
- Grit Haid as Mannequin
- Helga Molander as Mannequin
- Elisabeth Pinajeff as Mannequin
- Ferry Sikla as Kommerzienrat
- Siegfried Berisch
- Hans Brausewetter
- Robert Garrison
- Emil Heyse
- Jenny Marba
- Paul Morgan
- Hermann Picha as Leiter einer Mannequinschule
- Toni Tetzlaff

== Bibliography ==
- Kapczynski, Jennifer M.; Richardson, Michael D., eds. (2014) [2012]. A New History of German Cinema. New York: Boydell & Brewer. ISBN 978-1-58046-854-1.
