= Max Glass =

Austrian filmmaker (1881–1965)

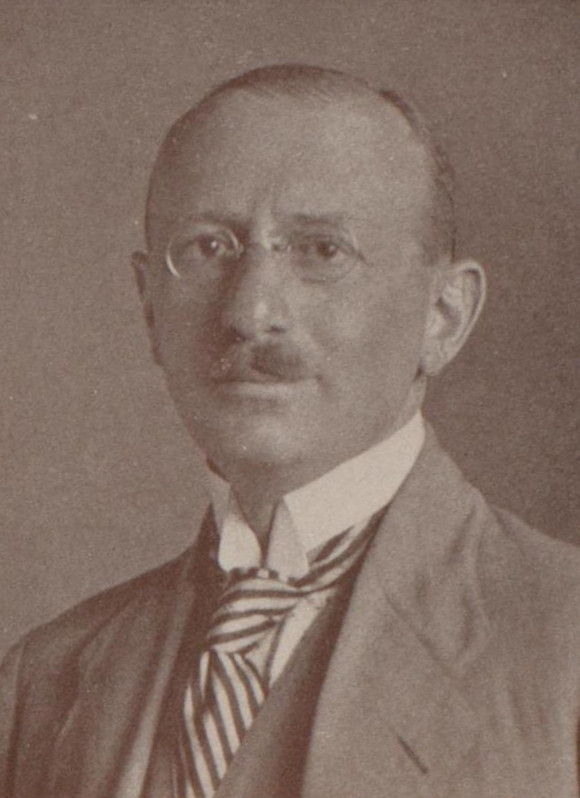
- Born: 12 June 1881; Jaroslau, Galicia; Austria-Hungary
- Died: 18 July 1965 (aged 84); Paris, France
- Occupations: Screenwriter, producer
- Years active: 1920–1952

Max Glass (12 June 1881 – 18 July 1965) was an Austrian screenwriter, film director, and producer.

Glass was born in Jaroslau, which was then part of the Austro-Hungarian Empire, into a Jewish family, but later converted to Catholicism. He gained a PhD in Philosophy from the University of Vienna. Glass entered the German film industry as a writer, but soon became a producer. By the mid-1920s he rose to be head of production at Terra Film before breaking away to set up his own production company in 1928 Glass' lover the actress Ruth Werner appeared in a number of his films but was unable to marry him until he had secured a divorce from his first wife, Dr. Helene Münz (married 1908–1957), with whom he had two sons, Paul Glass (born 1910) and Georges Glass (born 19 October 1917, Vienna).

Following the Nazi takeover of power in Germany in 1933, Glass' production companies were shut down and he was forced to go into exile in France. Glass again worked as a producer, but ran into further trouble following the German invasion of France during the Second World War. In 1942 the collaborationist Vichy Government stripped him of his citizenship. Glass and Werner then went to Brazil and United States for the remainder of the conflict, only returning to France once the war was over. They finally married in 1957.

== Selected filmography ==
=== Writer ===
- Die entfesselte Menschheit (novel; 1920 - that year the novel was adapted to the screen to a film by the same name)

=== Director ===
- The Man in the Iron Mask (1923)
- Bob and Mary (1923)
- La reine des resquilleuses (1937)
- The Road to Damascus (1952)

=== Screenwriter ===
- Humanity Unleashed (1920)
- Countess Maritza (1925)
- The Humble Man and the Chanteuse (1925)
- If You Have an Aunt (1925)
- Why Get a Divorce? (1926)
- The Sea Cadet (1926)
- Young Blood (1926)
- Vienna - Berlin (1926)
- The Man Without Sleep (1926)
- The Three Mannequins (1926)
- Svengali (1927)
- Bigamie (1927)
- The Tragedy of a Lost Soul (1927)
- Homesick (1927)
- Leontine's Husbands (1928)
- Love in the Ring (1930)
- Rasputin (1938)
- Entente cordiale (1939)
- Le chemin de Damas (1952)

=== Producer ===
- The Man Who Sold Himself (1925)
- Give My Regards to the Blonde Child on the Rhine (1926)
- Svengali (1927)
- Homesick (1927)
- Queen Louise (1927)
- The Ship of Lost Souls (1929)
- Zwei Krawatten (1930)
- The Soaring Maiden (1931)
- The Unknown Guest (1931)
- The Firm Gets Married (1931)
- Rasputin (1938)
- Blonde (1950)

== Bibliography ==
- Buchanan, Roderick D. (2010). Playing With Fire: The Controversial Career of Hans J. Eysenck. Oxford: Oxford University Press. ISBN 978-0-19-856688-5.
