= The Sign of Guilt =

1918 film directed by Richard Eichberg

- Directed by: Richard Eichberg
- Written by: Arthur Teuber
- Produced by: Richard Eichberg
- Starring: Bruno Decarli; Helga Molander; Clementine Plessner
- Cinematography: Max Terno
- Production company: Richard Eichberg-Film
- Distributed by: Central-Film-Vertriebs
- Release date: 3 November 1918
- Country: Germany
- Languages: Silent; German intertitles

The Sign of Guilt (German: Im Zeichen der Schuld) is a 1918 German silent crime drama film directed by Richard Eichberg and starring Bruno Decarli, Helga Molander and Clementine Plessner. The film's sets were designed by the art director Max Faßhauer. The film premiered at the Marmorhaus in Berlin It provided a sympathetic depiction of the rehabilitation of former convicts.

== Cast ==
- Bruno Decarli as Arndt Vandram
- Helga Molander as Grace Vandram
- Clementine Plessner as Dora Patten
- Alfred Dennert as Georg Barker
- Rudolf Essek as Arthur Lowel
- Kurt Halden as Baron van Deuren
- Guido Herzfeld as Abel Sampson
- Aenderly Lebius as Josef Wilmot
- Leontine Kühnberg as Margarete
- Martin Lübbert as Fred Alden
- Emil Rameau as Kapitän Vernon

== Bibliography ==
- Bock, Hans-Michael & Bergfelder, Tim. The Concise CineGraph. Encyclopedia of German Cinema. Berghahn Books, 2009.
