= Maurice Dekobra =

French writer (1885–1973)

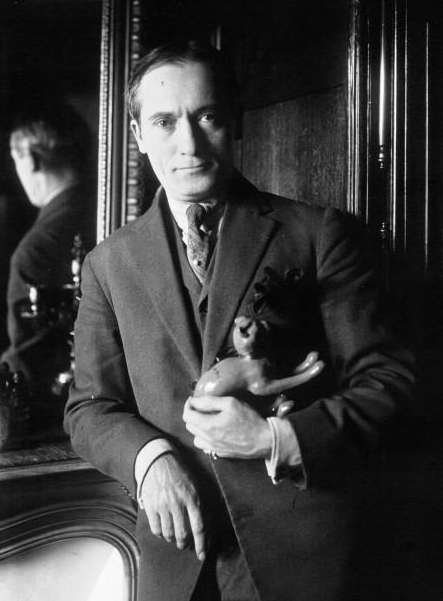
Maurice Dekobra in 1927

Maurice Dekobra (26 May 1885, Paris – 1 June 1973, Paris) was a French writer. His real name was Ernest-Maurice Tessier.

Viewed as a subversive writer in the 1920s and 1930s, he became one of the best-known French writers between the First and the Second World Wars. His books have been translated into 77 languages, and he has been described as an early example of an international best-seller writer. This is particularly true of his best known work, La Madone des Sleepings (1925).

In spite of this, and the publication of a biography by Philippe Collas in 2001, he was declared a "total unknown" in 2005, though the republication of La Madone des Sleepings by the publisher Zulma in 2006 has increased awareness of him, at least in France.

== Biography ==
At the age of 19, he started his career as a trilingual journalist – French, English, German. During the 1914–18 War he was attached as liaison officer/interpreter first to the Indian army, and later to the United States army. The contacts he made at this time ignited his passion for travel. He attributed the origin of his pen name to an episode in North Africa when he saw a snake charmer with two cobras. Allegedly he began thinking of the "deux cobras", which led him to De-kobra, then Dekobra. The term 'dekobrisme' was coined from his fiction, which used journalistic features in his novels. He chose to live in the United States from 1939 to 1946. Upon returning to France, he started writing whodunits. One of these, Opération Magali (1951) won the Prix du Quai des Orfèvres.

Some of his novels were made into films.

== Bibliography ==
- Les Mémoires de Rat-de-Cave ou Du Cambriolage considéré comme un des beaux-arts (1912)
- Grain d'Cachou ou Montmartre pendant la guerre ou La petite dame sans camélias (1918)
- Les Liaisons tranquilles (1920)
- Minuit... Place Pigalle (1923)
- Mon coeur au ralenti (1924)
- La Vénus à roulettes (1925)
- La Madone des sleepings (1925)
- La Gondole aux chimères (1926)
- Les nuits de Walpurgis (1926)
- Tu seras courtisane (1927)
- Flammes de velours (1927)
- Sérénade au Bourreau (1928)
- Les Tigres Parfumés - Aventures Au Pays Des Maharajahs (1929)
- Prince ou Pitre (1929)
- Le Sphinx a parlé... (1930)
- Aux cent mille sourires (1931)
- Fusillé à l'aube (1931)
- Aux cent mille sourires (1931)
- Pourquoi mourir? (1931)
- L'Archange aux pieds fourchus (1931)
- La Volupté éclairant le monde, (1932)
- Rat-de-cave, cambrioleur (1932)
- Confucius en pull-over (1934)
- Madame Joli-Supplice (1935)
- Macao, enfer du jeu (1938)
- Émigrés de luxe (1941)
- Le roman d'un lâche (1942)
- La Perruche Bleue Journal d'une courtisane sous la terreur nazie (1945)
- Hamydal le Philosophe (1947)
- La Prison des Rêves (1947)
- Satan refuse du monde (1947)
- Et Eve gifla Adam... ou les aventures d'une Yankee à Montparnasse (1949)
- Salutations distinguées (1949)
- La Pavane des poisons (1950)
- La Rafle est pour ce soir (1953)
- Monsieur Lambers mourra ce soir (1957)
- Son altesse mon amant (1958)
- Passeport diplomatique (1959)
- Casanova à Manhattan (1960)
- La Trahison du colonel Redko (1960)
- L'homme qui mourut deux fois - Les vestales du veau d'or (1960)
- Secrets de sleeping (1960)
- 13ÈME AMANT

== Filmography ==
- The Ways of Love Are Strange, directed by Fritz Kaufmann (1927, based on the short story La Girl aux mains fines)
- Prince or Clown, directed by Aleksandr Razumny (1928, based on the novel Prince ou Pitre)
- Change of Heart, directed by Marco de Gastyne (1928, based on the novel Mon coeur au ralenti)
- Madonna of the Sleeping Cars, directed by Maurice Gleize and Marco de Gastyne (1928, based on the novel La Madone des sleepings)
- Minuit, place Pigalle, directed by René Hervil (1928, based on the novel Minuit... Place Pigalle)
- Latin Quarter, directed by Augusto Genina (1929, based on the novel Quartier Latin)
- Friends and Lovers, directed by Victor Schertzinger (1931, based on the novel Le Sphinx a parlé)
- Minuit, place Pigalle, directed by Roger Richebé (1934, based on the novel Minuit... Place Pigalle)
- The Phantom Gondola, directed by Augusto Genina (1936, based on the novel La Gondole aux chimères)
- Yoshiwara, directed by Max Ophüls (1937, based on the novel Yoshiwara)
- Latin Quarter, directed by Alexander Esway, Christian Chamborant and Pierre Colombier (1939, based on the novel Quartier Latin)
- Macao, directed by Jean Delannoy (1939/42, based on the novel Macao, l'enfer du jeu, starring Erich von Stroheim, Mireille Balin and Sessue Hayakawa)
- Shot at Dawn, directed by André Haguet (1950, based on the novel Fusillé à l'aube)
- Serenade to the Executioner, directed by Jean Stelli (1951, based on the novel Sérénade au bourreau)
- Hell Is Sold Out, directed by Michael Anderson (1951, based on the novel Satan refuse du monde)
- Operation Magali, directed by László Kish (1953, based on the novel Opération Magali)
- La Rue des bouches peintes, directed by Robert Vernay (1955, based on the novel Rue des bouches peintes)
- Madonna of the Sleeping Cars, directed by Henri Diamant-Berger (1955, based on the novel La Madone des sleepings)
- Suspicion, directed by Pierre Billon (1956, based on the novel La Pavane des poisons)
- Passeport diplomatique agent K 8, directed by Robert Vernay (1965, based on the novel Passeport diplomatique)

=== Screenwriter ===
- La Sirène des tropiques (dir. Henri Étiévant and Mario Nalpas, 1927)
- La rafle est pour ce soir (dir. Maurice Dekobra, 1954)

=== Director ===
- La rafle est pour ce soir (1954)
