= Echo of a Dream =

1930 film

- Directed by: Martin Berger
- Screenplay by: Martin Berger
- Based on: Ciuleandra by Liviu Rebreanu
- Produced by: Martin Berger
- Cinematography: Georg Bruckbauer; László Schäffer
- Music by: Artur Guttmann
- Release date: 20 October 1930
- Running time: 88 minutes
- Countries: Germany; Romania
- Languages: German; Romanian

Echo of a Dream (German: Verklungene Träume) was a 1930 German-Romanian musical film directed by Martin Berger, based on the novel Ciuleandra by Liviu Rebreanu. It premiered on 20 October 1930. It was Romania's first sound film, and only a fragment remains.

== Cast ==
- Maly Delschaft as Madalina
- Hans Stüwe as Puiu Faranga and Mironescu
- Elvira Godeanu as Anita
- Maria Forescu as Madalina's mother
