= Hans Steinhoff =

German film director

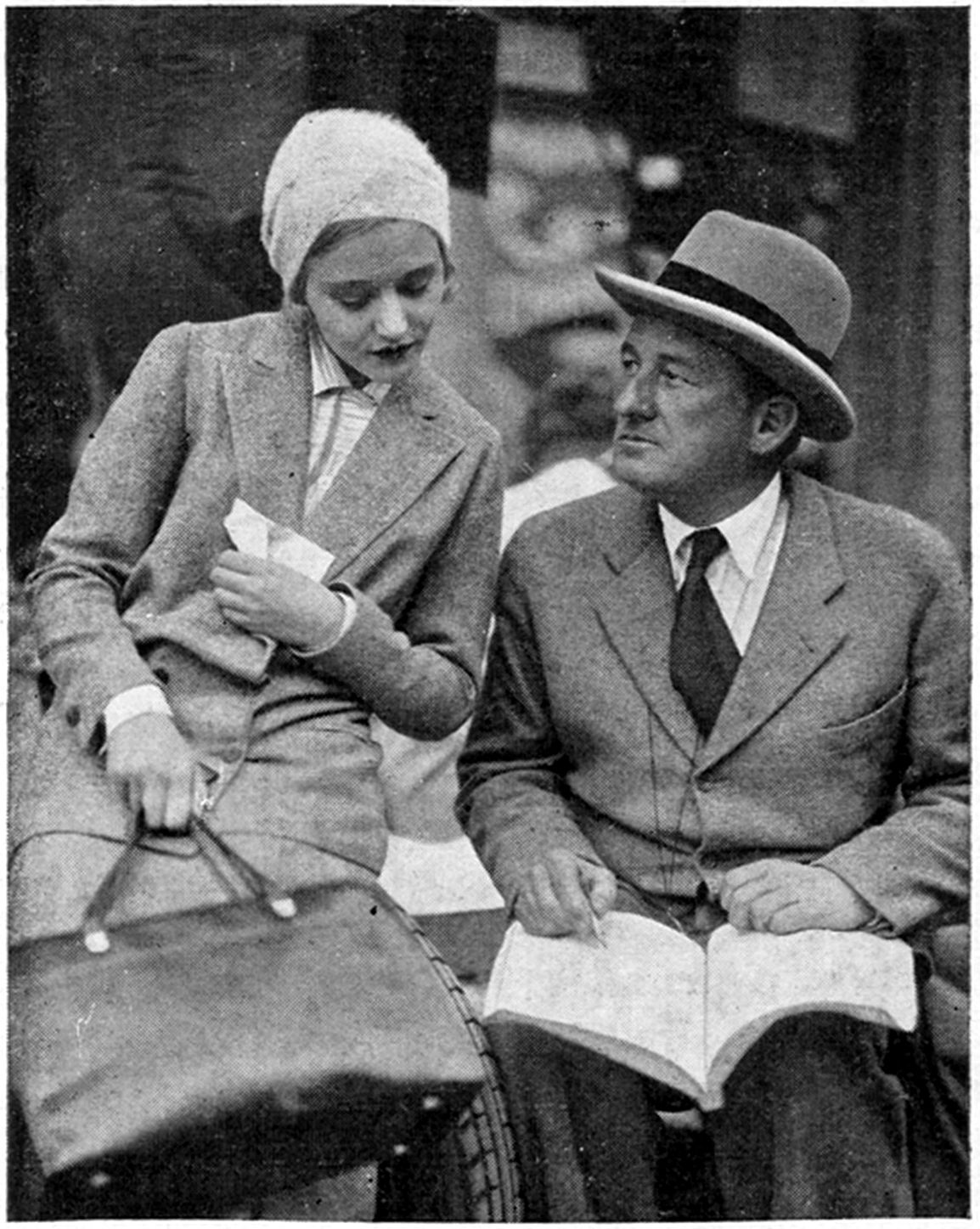
- Director Hans Steinhoff with Lien Deyers at the recording of Rosenmontag, 1930
- Born: 10 March 1882; Marienberg, Saxony, German Empire
- Died: 20 April 1945 (aged 63); Brandenburg, Nazi Germany
- Cause of death: Airplane crash from enemy fire
- Occupation: Film director
- Years active: 1900s–1945

Hans Steinhoff (10 March 1882 – 20 April 1945) was a German film director, best known for the propaganda films he produced in Nazi Germany.

== Life and career ==
Steinhoff started his career as a stage actor in the 1900s and later worked as a stage director. Following a decline in popularity of theater after World War I, he transitioned to the film industry. He directed his first silent film, Clothes Make the Man, the adaptation of a novel by Gottfried Keller, in 1921. Steinhoff went on to direct several other popular commercial films before transitioning to his career as a propagandist.

Steinhoff was a convinced Nazi and directed many propaganda films; he sometimes even wore his Nazi Party membership button on the film set. His most notable films were perhaps Hitlerjunge Quex (1933), an influential propaganda film for the Hitler Youth, and Ohm Krüger (1940), for which he won the Mussolini Cup at the 1941 Venice Film Festival.

On April 20, 1945, during the last war days, Steinhoff tried to escape from Berlin on the last scheduled Lufthansa flight. The plane, a Junkers Ju 52, was shot down by the Soviet Red Army, and all but one of the passengers died.

== Reception ==
Billy Wilder, who wrote some screenplays for Steinhoff during the early 1930s, said about him: "A man without any talent. He was a Nazi, even a Hundred-percent-one. But there were also many Nazis who had talent. I would never say that Leni Riefenstahl didn't have talent ... But I say about Steinhoff, that he was an idiot, not because he was a Nazi, but also a bad director."

Steinhoff was also very unpopular with many of his actors. Hans Albers called him "the greatest asshole of the century", while O. W. Fischer referred to him as "browner than Joseph Goebbels and blacker than Heinrich Himmler.

== Selected filmography ==
- The False Dimitri (1922)
- Inge Larsen (1923)
- Man Against Man (1924)
- Countess Maritza (1925)
- The Man Who Sold Himself (1925)
- Sons in Law (1926)
- Vienna - Berlin (1926)
- The Master of Death (1926)
- Family Gathering in the House of Prellstein (1927)
- The Tragedy of a Lost Soul (1927)
- The Bordello in Rio (1927)
- Angst (1928)
- When the Guard Marches (1928)
- The Alley Cat (1929)
- The Three Kings (1929)
- Love's Carnival (1930)
- Everybody Wins (1930)
- My Leopold (1931)
- Headfirst into Happiness (1931)
- The Paw (1931)
- The True Jacob (1931)
- Scampolo (1932)
- Madame Wants No Children (1933)
- Love Must Be Understood (1933)
- Hitlerjunge Quex (1933)
- Decoy (1934)
- The Island (1934)
- Enjoy Yourselves (1934)
- Mother and Child (1934)
- The Old and the Young King (1935)
- The Valley of Love (1935)
- A Woman of No Importance (1936)
- An Enemy of the People (1937)
- Gestern und heute (1938)
- Dance on the Volcano (1938), with Gustaf Gründgens as Jean-Gaspard Deburau
- Robert Koch (1939)
- The Vulture Wally (1940)
- Ohm Krüger (1941)
- Rembrandt (1942)
- Gabriele Dambrone (1943)
- Melusine (1944)
