= The Circus of Life (1926 film) =

1926 German film

- Directed by: Mario Bonnard; Guido Parish
- Written by: Leo Birinsky; Mario Bonnard
- Produced by: Herman Millakowsky
- Starring: Marcella Albani; Vladimir Gajdarov; Fritz Kampers
- Cinematography: Mutz Greenbaum; Theodor Sparkuhl
- Production company: Greenbaum-Film
- Distributed by: Parufamet
- Release date: 12 November 1926
- Country: Germany
- Languages: Silent; German intertitles

The Circus of Life (German: Die Flucht in den Zirkus) is a 1926 German silent film directed by Mario Bonnard and Guido Parish and starring Marcella Albani, Vladimir Gajdarov and Fritz Kampers. It was shot at the Staaken Studios in Berlin. The film's art direction was by Andrej Andrejew, Karl Görge and August Rinaldi.

The film was screened in the United Kingdom in 1928, with a reviewer for the Derby Daily Telegraph calling it "one of the best Russian films seen for some time".

== Plot ==
A young nobleman marries a poor peasant girl, who is falsely accused of murder and transported to Siberia. She eventually escapes with her lover.

== Cast ==
- Marcella Albani as Mistress Wera
- Vladimir Gajdarov as Officer Wladimir Bobrikoff
- Fritz Kampers as Iwanoff - Anarchist
- Henry Bender
- Eugen Burg
- William Dieterle as Cossack
- Olga Engl as Mother of Wladimir
- Karl Harbacher
- Leopold von Ledebur
- Hans Mierendorff
- Hermann Picha
- Louis Ralph as Boris - Anarchist
- Frida Richard
- Gerhard Ritterband
- Guido Parish

== Bibliography ==
- Bock, Hans-Michael & Bergfelder, Tim. The Concise CineGraph. Encyclopedia of German Cinema. Berghahn Books, 2009.
