= Madame et son flirt =

1946 film

Madame et son flirt is a 1946 French film starring Giselle Pascal.

It recorded admissions in France of 1,659,306.
