= Vienna – Berlin =

1926 film

- German: Wien – Berlin
- Directed by: Hans Steinhoff
- Written by: Max Glass
- Starring: Charlotte Ander; Anita Dorris; Egon von Jordan
- Cinematography: Alfred Hansen
- Music by: Werner R. Heymann
- Production company: Terra Film
- Distributed by: Terra Film
- Release date: August 1926
- Running time: 80 minutes
- Countries: Austria; Germany
- Languages: Silent; German intertitles

Vienna – Berlin (German: Wien – Berlin) is a 1926 Austrian-German silent drama film directed by Hans Steinhoff and starring Charlotte Ander, Anita Dorris and Egon von Jordan. It was shot at the Terra Studios in Berlin. The film's art director was Hans Jacoby. It premiered at Berlin's Gloria-Palast.

== Cast ==
- Charlotte Ander as Grollmann's daughter Karla
- Anita Dorris as Lonerl
- Egon von Jordan as Rudi
- Fritz Spira as Berndörfer
- Bruno Kastner as Grollmann's son Joachim
- Fritz Alberti as Grollmann
- Jenny Marba as Berndörfer's wife
- Wilhelm Diegelmann as Diener bei Berndörfer
- Jaro Fürth as Accountant Huber
- Kurt Gerron as American
- Paul Morgan as a stockbroker
- Franz Groß as Arbeiter Wallner
- Henry Bender as The Fat Lord
- Teddy Bill as Ein Heurigenfänger
