= Kire lained =

1930 film directed by Vladimir Gajdarov

- Directed by: Vladimir Gajdarov
- Screenplay by: Kurt J. Braun; Hans Fischer; Max W. Kimmich
- Produced by: Sigrid von der Ley
- Starring: Raymondo van Riel; Ita Rina; Fritz Greiner; Vladimir Gajdarov; Juta Jol; Ernst Falkenberg; Hugo Laur
- Music by: Bert Reisfeld
- Production companies: Wladimir Gaidarow Film (Germany); Urania-Film (Estonia)
- Release dates: 10 October 1930 (Estonia); 17 October 1930 (Germany)
- Running time: 78 minutes
- Countries: Estonia; Germany
- Language: Estonian

Kire lained (German: Wellen der Leidenschaft) is a 1930 Estonian-German action and drama film directed by Vladimir Gajdarov.

Awards, nominations, participations:

- 2019: Le Giornate del Cinema Muto Silent Film Festival (Italy, Pordenone), participation

== Cast ==
- Raimondo Van Riel - Mart Martens
- Ita Rina - Betty, his daughter
- Fritz Greiner - Jaan Kõlgis, king of the spirit
- Hugo Laur - Bratt, his assistant
- Vladimir Gajdarov - Rex Ronney, writer
- Jutta Jol - Leida, harbour maid
- Hugo Döblin - Feigelbaum, usurer
- Ernst Falkenberg - Raymondo Valdivio
- Ants Eskola
