= Franz Klebusch =

German actor

- Born: 22 January 1887; Mannheim, German Empire
- Died: 25 May 1951 (aged 64); Dresden, East Germany
- Occupation: Actor
- Years active: 1927–1944 (film)

Franz Klebusch (22 January 1887 – 25 May 1951) was a German stage and film actor. Klebusch appeared in 27 films during his career including a small role in the antisemitic film Jud Süß (1940).

== Selected filmography ==
- A Murderous Girl (1929)
- The Third Confession (1929)
- Trenck (1932)
- Little Girl, Great Fortune (1933)
- Between Two Hearts (1934)
- The Sporck Battalion (1934)
- The Private Life of Louis XIV (1935)
- Black Roses (1935)
- Across the Desert (1936)
- Love's Awakening (1936)

== Bibliography ==
- Picart, Caroline Joan. The Holocaust Film Sourcebook: Documentary and propaganda. Praeger, 2004 .
