= Gestern und heute =

1938 film by Hans Steinhoff and Ben Keim

Gestern und Heute
- Directed by: Hans Steinhoff
- Music by: Peter Kreuder
- Release date: 1938
- Running time: 11 minutes
- Country: Nazi Germany
- Language: German

Gestern und heute (English: Yesterday and Today) is a 1938 German Nazi propaganda short film directed by Hans Steinhoff and Ben Keim at the Reichspropagandaleitung.

== Plot summary ==
The documentary film contrasts Germany in the days before Adolf Hitler became chancellor with the current (late 1930s) day Germany and how it has improved. The film was widely popularized by German propagandist Ben Keim by order of Josef Goebbels.

== Soundtrack ==
Music in the film was composed by German-Austrian Peter Kreuder.

== See also ==
- Wort und Tat
