= Bob and Mary =

1923 German silent film

- Directed by: Max Glass
- Written by: Bobby E. Lüthge
- Starring: Helga Molander; Anton Edthofer; Paul Biensfeldt
- Cinematography: A.O. Weitzenberg
- Production company: Terra Film
- Distributed by: Terra Film
- Release date: 1 October 1923
- Country: Germany
- Languages: Silent; German intertitles

Bob and Mary (German: Bob und Mary) is a 1923 German silent film directed by Max Glass and starring Helga Molander, Anton Edthofer, and Paul Biensfeldt.

The film's art direction was by Robert Neppach.

== Cast ==
- Helga Molander as Mary
- Anton Edthofer as Bob
- Paul Biensfeldt
- Paul Bildt
- Lia Eibenschütz
- Karl Falkenberg
- Leonhard Haskel
- Guido Herzfeld
- Emil Heyse
- Margarete Kupfer
- Luigi Serventi
- Leopold von Ledebur

== Bibliography ==
- Buchanan, Roderick D. (2010). Playing With Fire: The Controversial Career of Hans J. Eysenck. Oxford: Oxford University Press. ISBN 978-0-19-856688-5.
