= The Sea Cadet =

1926 film directed by Carl Boese

- Directed by: Carl Boese
- Written by: Max Glass
- Starring: Walter Slezak; Gerd Briese; Fritz Alberti
- Cinematography: Alfred Hansen
- Music by: Felix Bartsch
- Production company: Terra Film
- Distributed by: Terra Film
- Release date: September 1926
- Running time: 72 minutes
- Country: Germany
- Languages: Silent; German intertitles

The Sea Cadet (German: Der Seekadett) is a 1926 German silent drama film directed by Carl Boese and starring Walter Slezak, Gerd Briese and Fritz Alberti. It was shot at the Terra Studios in Berlin. The film's sets were designed by the art director Karl Görge.

== Cast ==
- Walter Slezak
- Gerd Briese
- Fritz Alberti
- Carl Auen
- Colette Brettel
- Christa Tordy
- Eva Speyer
- Teddy Bill
- Sophie Pagay
- Gottfried Hagedorn

== Bibliography ==
- Alfred Krautz. International directory of cinematographers, set- and costume designers in film, Volume 4. Saur, 1984.
