= Revenge of the Bandits =

1922 film by Reinhhard Bruck

- Directed by: Reinhard Bruck
- Written by: Max Jungk; Konrad Telman (novel); Julius Urgiß
- Produced by: Albert Pommer
- Starring: Asta Nielsen; Bruno Decarli; Walter Brugman
- Cinematography: Otto Kanturek
- Production company: Decarli
- Distributed by: Cela-Film
- Release date: 17 February 1922
- Country: Germany
- Languages: Silent; German intertitles

Revenge of the Bandits (German: Brigantenrache) is a 1922 German silent film directed by Reinhard Bruck and starring Asta Nielsen, Bruno Decarli and Walter Brugman. The film was released on 17 February 1922.

== Cast ==
- Asta Nielsen as Brigantenbraut
- Bruno Decarli as Reggiero
- Walter Brugman as Danilo
- Margit Barnay as Wirtstochter

== Bibliography ==
- Grange, William (2008). Cultural Chronicle of the Weimar Republic. Lanham: Scarecrow Press. ISBN 978-0-8108-6261-6.
