= The Man Without Sleep =

1926 film by Carl Boese

- Directed by: Carl Boese
- Written by: Max Glass; Kurt Löwen
- Starring: Harry Liedtke; Maly Delschaft; Fritz Kampers; Helga Molander
- Cinematography: Alfred Hansen
- Production company: Terra Film
- Distributed by: Terra Film
- Release date: 12 February 1926
- Country: Germany
- Languages: Silent; German intertitles

The Man Without Sleep (German: Der Mann ohne Schlaf) is a 1926 German silent film directed by Carl Boese and starring Harry Liedtke, Maly Delschaft, and Fritz Kampers. It premiered in Berlin on 12 February 1926. The film's art direction was by Julius von Borsody.

== Cast ==
- Harry Liedtke
- Maly Delschaft
- Fritz Kampers
- Helga Molander
- Emil Heyse
- Hugo Fischer-Köppe
- Hanni Weisse

== Bibliography ==
- Grange, William (2008). Cultural Chronicle of the Weimar Republic. Lanham, Maryland: Scarecrow Press. ISBN 978-0-8108-5967-8.
