= Connare =

Connare is a surname. Notable people with the surname include:

- Vincent Connare (born 1960), Microsoft employee and typographer
- William G. Connare (1911–1995), American Roman Catholic prelate

== See also ==
- Connard
