= Give My Regards to the Blonde Child on the Rhine =

1926 film directed by Carl Boese

- Film poster
- German: Grüß mir das blonde Kind am Rhein
- Directed by: Carl Boese
- Written by: Max Glass
- Starring: Walter Slezak; Hanni Reinwald; Frida Richard
- Cinematography: Alfred Hansen
- Music by: Hansheinrich Dransmann
- Production company: Terra Film
- Distributed by: Terra Film
- Release date: 21 January 1926
- Country: Germany
- Languages: Silent; German intertitles

Give My Regards to the Blonde Child on the Rhine (German: Grüß mir das blonde Kind am Rhein) is a 1926 German silent film directed by Carl Boese and starring Walter Slezak, Hanni Reinwald and Frida Richard. It takes its name from a popular song.

== Cast ==
- Walter Slezak
- Hanni Reinwald
- Frida Richard
- Wilhelm Diegelmann
- Fritz Kampers
- Emil Heyse
- Paula Eberty
- Henry Bender
