= The Tragedy of a Lost Soul =

1927 film

- Directed by: Hans Steinhoff
- Written by: Max Glass
- Starring: Alfred Abel; Helga Molander; Ralph Arthur Roberts
- Cinematography: Alfred Hansen
- Music by: Willy Schmidt-Gentner
- Production company: Terra Film
- Distributed by: Terra Film
- Release date: 10 February 1927
- Running time: 75 minutes
- Country: Germany
- Languages: Silent; German intertitles

The Tragedy of a Lost Soul (German: Die Tragödie eines Verlorenen) is a 1927 German silent drama film directed by Hans Steinhoff and starring Alfred Abel, Helga Molander and Ralph Arthur Roberts. It was shot at the Terra Studios in Berlin. The film's sets were designed by the art director Alfred Junge.

== Cast ==
- Alfred Abel
- Helga Molander
- Ralph Arthur Roberts
- Alfred Gerasch
- Tzwetta Tzatschewa
- Sophie Pagay
- Kurt Gerron
- Philipp Manning
- Paul Rehkopf
- Emil Heyse

== Bibliography ==
- Grange, William. Cultural Chronicle of the Weimar Republic. Scarecrow Press, 2008.
