= The Pirates of the Baltic Sea =

1927 film

- Directed by: Valy Arnheim
- Written by: Curt J. Braun; Paul Morgan
- Produced by: Valy Arnheim
- Starring: Valy Arnheim
- Cinematography: László Schäffer
- Release date: 7 January 1927
- Country: Germany
- Languages: Silent; German intertitles

The Pirates of the Baltic Sea or The Pirates of the Baltic Sea Resorts (German:Die Piraten der Ostseebäder) is a 1927 German silent mystery film directed by and starring Valy Arnheim. Arnheim played the role of the detective Harry Hill, one of several films in which the character appeared.

The film's sets were designed by the art director Willi Herrmann.

== Cast ==
- Valy Arnheim as Harry Hill, Detektiv
- Marga Lindt
- Hilde Maroff
- Fritz Kampers
- Harry Bender
- Bobbie Bender
- Maria Forescu
- Paul Morgan
- Karl Victor Plagge
- Rudolf Lettinger
- Karl Falkenberg
- Gerd Briese
