= Between Two Hearts =

1934 film

- Directed by: Herbert Selpin
- Written by: Curt J. Braun
- Based on: Ulla die Tochter by Werner Scheff
- Produced by: Walter Zeiske
- Starring: Harry Liedtke; Luise Ullrich; Olga Chekhova
- Cinematography: Bruno Timm
- Edited by: Lena Neumann
- Music by: Franz Grothe
- Production company: Terra Film
- Distributed by: Terra Film
- Release date: 30 January 1934
- Running time: 82 minutes
- Country: Germany
- Language: German

Between Two Hearts (German: Zwischen zwei Herzen) is a 1934 German drama film directed by Herbert Selpin and starring Harry Liedtke, Luise Ullrich and Olga Chekhova. It is based on the novel Ulla die Tochter by Werner Scheff. It was shot at the Marienfelde Studios of Terra Film in Berlin and on location in Bavaria. The film's sets were designed by the art director Robert A. Dietrich.

== Cast ==
- Harry Liedtke as Detlev Sonnekamp
- Luise Ullrich as Ulla Georgius
- Olga Chekhova as Inge Leuthoff
- Fritz Odemar as Rudolf Kämmerer
- Paul Henckels as Dr. Georgius
- Erna Morena as Frau Georgius
- Franz Nicklisch as Harald Söldin
- Paul Otto as Justizrat Röseler
- Paul Heidemann as Golm, Diener bei Sonnekamp
- Anna Müller-Lincke as Dora Jänisch
- Josef Dahmen as Müller, Chauffeur bei Sonnekamp
- Ernst Dernburg
- Erich Bartels
- Franz Klebusch

== Bibliography ==
- Goble, Alan. The Complete Index to Literary Sources in Film. Walter de Gruyter, 1999.
- Waldman, Harry. Nazi Films in America, 1933-1942. McFarland, 2008.
