= Nikolai Malikoff =

Russian-Ukrainian film director and actor

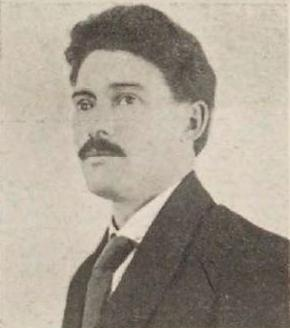
- Malikoff in 1916
- Born: Nikolai Petrovich Malikoff; 1874; Kiev, Russian Empire
- Died: 20 April 1931 (aged 56–57); Riga, Latvia
- Occupations: Film director, actor
- Years active: 1910-1930 (film)

Nikolai Malikoff (Russian: Николай Петрович Маликов; 1874 – 20 April 1931) was a Russian film director and actor who worked mainly as a film director in Russia, and later as an actor in Germany.

== Selected filmography ==
- Insulted and Humiliated (1922)
- The Island of Dreams (1925)
- Superfluous People (1926)
- The Son of Hannibal (1926)
- His Toughest Case (1926)
- Fedora (1926)
- The Ones Down There (1926)
- Fräulein Mama (1926)
- Heads Up, Charley (1927)
- The Girl from Abroad (1927)
- The Trial of Donald Westhof (1927)
- Apaches of Paris (1927)
- Rasputin, the Holy Sinner (1928)
- Spy of Madame Pompadour (1928)
- The President (1928)
- The Woman in the Advocate's Gown (1929)
- Storm of Love (1929)
- Rustle of Spring (1929)
- The Ring of the Empress (1930)
- Police Spy 77 (1930)

== Bibliography ==
- Goble, Alan. The Complete Index to Literary Sources in Film. Walter de Gruyter, 1999.
