= Storm of Love (film) =

1929 film

- Directed by: Martin Berger
- Written by: Marcel Romanescu; Mihail Sadoveanu; Alfred Schirokauer
- Produced by: Friedrich von Maydell
- Starring: Marcella Albani; Nikolai Malikoff; Boris Michailow
- Cinematography: Tudor Posmantir; László Schäffer
- Production company: Mondo-Film
- Distributed by: Mondo-Film
- Release date: October 1929
- Country: Germany
- Languages: Silent; German intertitles

Storm of Love (German: Sturmflut der Liebe) is a 1929 German silent film directed by Martin Berger and starring Marcella Albani, Nikolai Malikoff, and Boris Michailow.

The film's sets were designed by Max Knaake.

== Cast ==
- Marcella Albani as Illeana
- Nikolai Malikoff as Der Bojar
- Boris Michailow as Der Verwalter
- Werner Fuetterer as Jonel
- Peter Voß as Matei
- Sybill Morel as Balascha
- Marion Gerth as Dina, eine reiche Waise
- Ion Brezeanu as Der Müller
- Alexandru Giugaru

== Bibliography ==
- Krautz, Alfred (1984). International Directory of Cinematographers, Set- and Costume Designers in Film. Vol. 4. Munich: Saur. ISBN 978-3-598-21434-9.
