= Mechthildis Thein =

German actress

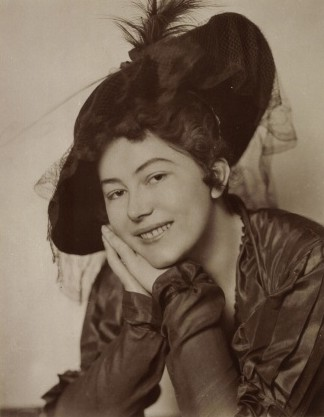
Mechthildis Thein

Mechthildis Thein (1888 in Braunschweig – 1959 in Singen) was a German stage and film actress of the silent period.

== Selected filmography ==
- Fear (1917)
- The Rat (1918)
- The Salamander Ruby (1918)
- Henriette Jacoby (1918)
- Countess Walewska (1920)
- Catherine the Great (1920)
