= The Ways of Love Are Strange (1927 film) =

1927 film

- Directed by: Fritz Kaufmann
- Written by: Maurice Dekobra; Jean Rosen
- Based on: La Girl aux mains fines by Maurice Dekobra
- Produced by: Fritz Kaufmann
- Starring: Maly Delschaft; Walter Slezak; Fritz Alberti
- Cinematography: Reimar Kuntze
- Production company: Fritz Kaufmann Film
- Distributed by: Arthur Ziehm Film
- Release date: 10 August 1927
- Running time: 93 minutes
- Country: Germany
- Languages: Silent; German intertitles

The Ways of Love Are Strange (German: Liebe geht seltsame Wege) is a 1927 German silent romantic drama film directed by Fritz Kaufmann and starring Maly Delschaft, Walter Slezak and Fritz Alberti. The film is based on a novel by Maurice Dekobra. It was shot at the Staaken Studios in Berlin. The film's sets were designed by the art director Kurt Richter.

== Synopsis ==
Jackson, a clerk at the Campbell Bank, has fled from Britain to Paris with embezzled money and sensitive documents belonging to the owner. His daughter Gladys pursues Jackson, but he turns the tables on her and blackmails her into a relationship by threatening to expose the activities of her father revealed in the documents. She refuses, and turns instead to Florizel, a painter for assistance. Despite already being in an affair with Susanne, the head of a fashion house, Campbell continues to pursue Gladys. Ultimately Susanne, realising his betrayal, shoots him dead. Campbell senior heads to Paris to recover the stolen documents and gives his blessing to an engagement between Florizel and Gladys.

== Cast ==
- Maly Delschaft as Susanne, Direktrice
- Walter Slezak as Florizel, 'Flo-Flo'
- Fritz Alberti as H. F. Campbell
- Geneviève Cargese as Gladys, seine Tochter
- Gaston Jacquet as Jackson

== Bibliography ==
- Bock, Hans-Michael & Bergfelder, Tim. The Concise CineGraph. Encyclopedia of German Cinema. Berghahn Books, 2009.
- Goble, Alan. The Complete Index to Literary Sources in Film. Walter de Gruyter, 1999.
- Lamprecht, Gerhard. Deutsche Stummfilme. Gesamtregister. Deutsche Kinemathek, 1970.
