= The Man Who Sold Himself (1925 film) =

1925 film

- German: Der Mann, der sich verkauft
- Directed by: Hans Steinhoff
- Written by: Max Glass; Hans Schulze (novel); Hans Steinhoff
- Starring: Hans Mierendorff; Vivian Gibson; Olaf Fjord
- Cinematography: Alfred Hansen
- Music by: Alexander Schirmann
- Production company: Terra Film
- Distributed by: Terra Film
- Release date: 23 October 1925
- Running time: 76 minutes
- Country: Germany
- Languages: Silent; German intertitles

The Man Who Sold Himself (German: Der Mann, der sich verkauft) is a 1925 German silent crime drama film directed by Hans Steinhoff and starring Hans Mierendorff, Vivian Gibson and Olaf Fjord. It was shot at the Terra Studios in Berlin. The film's art direction was by Robert Neppach.

== Cast ==
- Hans Mierendorff as Jan Bracca
- Vivian Gibson as Marion de L'Orme
- Olaf Fjord as Achim von Wehrstädt
- Nora Gregor as Daisy Bracca
- Harry Lamberts-Paulsen as Chauffeur Plazceck
- Bruno Kastner as Count Harden
- Robert Garrison as theater director
- Erich Kaiser-Titz as Coroner Korn
- Helga Molander as Eva
- Hermann Picha as office worker
