= Leo Connard =

Austrian actor

- Born: Isak Leopold Kohn; 28 August 1860; Pécs, Kingdom of Hungary, Austrian Empire
- Died: 21 June 1931 (aged 70); Berlin, Germany
- Occupation: Actor
- Years active: 1916-1928

Leo Connard (born Isak Leopold Kohn; 28 August 1860 – after 1928) was an Austrian stage and film actor. He appeared in more than thirty films from 1916 to 1928.

== Selected filmography ==
Year	Title	Role	Notes
1918	Jettchen Gebert's Story		
1918	Henriette Jacoby		
1919	Die Arche		
1919	Different from the Others		
1920	Whitechapel		
1925	Wallenstein		
1925	Women You Rarely Greet		
1927	Mata Hari		
