= Madonna of the Sleeping Cars (1928 film) =

1928 film

- Directed by: Marco de Gastyne; Maurice Gleize
- Written by: Maurice Dekobra (novel); Marco de Gastyne
- Starring: Claude France; Olaf Fjord; Maurice Dekobra
- Cinematography: Raymond Agnel; Gaston Brun; Paul Parguel
- Production company: Pathé-Natan
- Distributed by: Pathé-Natan
- Release date: 1928
- Country: France
- Languages: Silent; French intertitles

Madonna of the Sleeping Cars (French: La madone des sleepings) is a 1928 French silent film directed by Marco de Gastyne and Maurice Gleize and starring Claude France, Olaf Fjord, and Maurice Dekobra. It is an adaptation of Maurice Dekobra's 1925 novel of the same title, which was later turned into a 1955 sound film.

== Cast ==
- Claude France as Lady Diana Wynham
- Olaf Fjord as Prince Seliman
- Henri Valbel
- Maurice Dekobra as Jail Warden
- Boris de Fast as Varichkine
- Mary Serta as Madame Mouravieff
- Annette Benson
- Nat Carr
- Michèle Verly
- Sergey Efron as Prisoner

== See also ==
- Change of Heart (1928), with Juliette Compton as Lady Winham and Olaf Fjord as Prince Seliman
- The Phantom Gondola (1936), with Marcelle Chantal as Lady Diana Wyndham
- Madonna of the Sleeping Cars (1955), with Gisèle Pascal as Lady Diana Wyndham

== Bibliography ==
- Goble, Alan. The Complete Index to Literary Sources in Film. Walter de Gruyter, 1999.
