= Madonna of the Sleeping Cars (1955 film) =

1955 film

- Directed by: Henri Diamant-Berger
- Written by: Henri Diamant-Berger
- Based on: Madonna of the Sleeping Cars by Maurice Dekobra
- Produced by: Henri Diamant-Berger
- Starring: Giselle Pascal; Jean Gaven; Erich von Stroheim
- Cinematography: Léonce-Henri Burel
- Edited by: Hélène Basté
- Music by: Louiguy
- Production company: Le Film d'Art
- Distributed by: La Société des Films Sirius
- Release date: 21 June 1955
- Running time: 96 minutes
- Country: France
- Language: French

Madonna of the Sleeping Cars (French: La madone des sleepings) is a 1955 French drama film directed by Henri Diamant-Berger and starring Giselle Pascal, Jean Gaven and Erich von Stroheim. The film is an adaptation of the 1925 novel of the same title by Maurice Dekobra, though the plot has been changed somewhat, and the action brought into the 1950s and set in Latin America rather than the Black Sea coast of the USSR.

It was shot at the Victorine Studios in Nice, with sets designed by the art director Eugène Piérac. Location shooting took place in Paris and elsewhere.

== Cast ==
- Giselle Pascal as Lady Diana Wynham
- Jean Gaven as Don Armando Félix
- Erich von Stroheim as Dr. Siegfried Traurig (final film)
- Philippe Mareuil as Gérard Dextrier
- Denise Vernac as Anna
- Berthe Cardona
- Fernand Rauzéna as Le Queledec
- Jacqueline Dane as Clara
- Joé Davray as L'ingénieur
- Jackie Blanchot
- Jacques Jouanneau as Henri - le chauffeur
- Robert Burnier as Commodore Felton
- Katherine Kath as Irena
- Lucien Callamand as L'actionnaire
- Paul Demange as Le voyageur
- Raymond Ménage
- Betty Phillippsen
- René Worms as Arthur

== See also ==
- Change of Heart (1928), with Juliette Compton as Lady Winham
- Madonna of the Sleeping Cars (1928), with Claude France as Lady Diana Wynham
- The Phantom Gondola (1936), with Marcelle Chantal as Lady Diana Wyndham

== Bibliography ==
- Goble, Alan. The Complete Index to Literary Sources in Film. Walter de Gruyter, 1999.
