= László Schäffer =

Hungarian cinematographer

László Schäffer (July 19, 1893 – May 1979), was a Hungarian cinematographer. Born in Ungvár, Kingdom of Hungary, Austria-Hungary, now a part of Ukraine, he worked mostly in Germany in the 1920s.

He moved in his youth to Budapest, where he worked as a photographer. During World War I, he became a cameraman and, after 1920, went to Berlin. With Fritz Arno Wagner, he filmed F. W. Murnau's The Haunted Castle (1921). A further high point in Schäffer's career was the employment as one of several cameramen in Walter Ruttmann's experimental documentary film Berlin: Symphony of a Great City (1927).

After the Nazi Party rose to power in 1933, Schäffer returned to Budapest. He took his place behind the cameras several times, until in 1939 he emigrated to the United States. Establishing himself in Los Angeles, he received no requests for his occupation. He died in Los Angeles in 1979.

== Filmography ==
- 1921: The Haunted Castle
- 1921: Das Mädchen aus dem Sumpf
- 1922: Jiu-Jitsu-Meisterin
- 1924: Graf Chargon
- 1926: Die Unschuld ohne Kleid
- 1927: The Pirates of the Baltic Sea
- 1927: Die glühende Gasse
- 1927: Berlin: Symphony of a Metropolis
- 1928: Polnische Wirtschaft
- 1928: The Last Performance of the Circus Wolfson
- 1928: Rasputin, the Holy Sinner
- 1929: Dangers of the Engagement Period
- 1928: Spelunke
- 1929: Storm of Love
- 1929: Was kostet Liebe?
- 1929: Ins Blaue hinein
- 1929: Möblierte Zimmer
- 1929: Such Is Life
- 1930: Echo of a Dream
- 1932: Rok 1914
- 1932: Puszcza
- 1935: The Students of Igloi
- 1936: Zivatar Kemenespusztán
- 1936: Pusztareiter (Hortobágy)
- 1936: Rubber
- 1938: The Girl with a Good Reputation
