= Marco de Gastyne =

French film director

- Born: 15 July 1889; Paris, France
- Died: 8 November 1982 (aged 93); Paris, France
- Known for: Painting; Illustration

Marc Henri Benoist better known as Marco de Gastyne (born in Paris, France, on 15 July 1889; died in Paris on 8 November 1982) was a French painter, illustrator and later film director of more than fifteen films.

After studying painting, he worked at la Villa Médicis from 1911 to 1913. He also became an illustrator for the French journal La Baïonnette. Then he turned to cinema directing more than a dozen films between 1922 and 1962. His debut film co-directed with Franz Toussaint was Inch'Allah in 1922. His most known film is La Merveilleuse Vie de Jeanne d'Arc which he directed in 1929.

He discovered Dalida and promoted her in his film Le Masque de Toutankhamon in 1954.

== Personal life ==
He was the son of French writer Jules Benoist, better known by his literary name Jules de Gastyne and his brother was the chief designer Guy de Gastyne. In 1914, he married Mary Christian, a lyrical singer, and they had a daughter before divorcing after ten years of marriage. Soon after, he remarried in 1924 with Choura Miléna, an actress in his films who predeceased him.

== Filmography ==
=== Director ===
- 1922: Inch'Allah (co-directed with Franz Toussaint)
- 1923: À l'horizon du sud (also known as L'Aventure)
- 1925: La Blessure (also known as Les Ailes brûlées)
- The Lady of Lebanon (1926)
- Madonna of the Sleeping Cars (1927) (co-directed with Maurice Gleize)
- Change of Heart (1928)
- Saint Joan the Maid (1929) (also known as La Merveilleuse vie de Jeanne d'Arc, fille de Lorraine)
- 1930: Une belle garce
- 1932: Une fine partie
- 1932: Le Chimpanzé
- 1932: Claudie dompteuse (also known as Mademoiselle Orphée)
- The Wandering Beast (1932)
- Rothchild (1934)
- 1935: Vas-y, tue-moi!
- 1937: La Reine des resquilleuses
- 1940: Une idée à l'eau (also known as L'Irrésistible Rebelle in a rerelease)
- 1950: Bistro
- 1955: Le Masque de Toutankhamon (also known as Le Trésor des pharaons)
- 1962: Trique, gamin de Paris
- 1964: Douchka

=== Screenwriter ===
- 1923: À l'horizon du sud (also known as L'Aventure)
- 1927: La Madone des sleepings
- 1950: Bistro
- 1962: Trique, gamin de Paris
- 1964: Douchka

== See also ==
- List of French film directors
- List of French painters
- List of French writers
- List of illustrators
