= Bruno Decarli =

German actor (1877–1950)

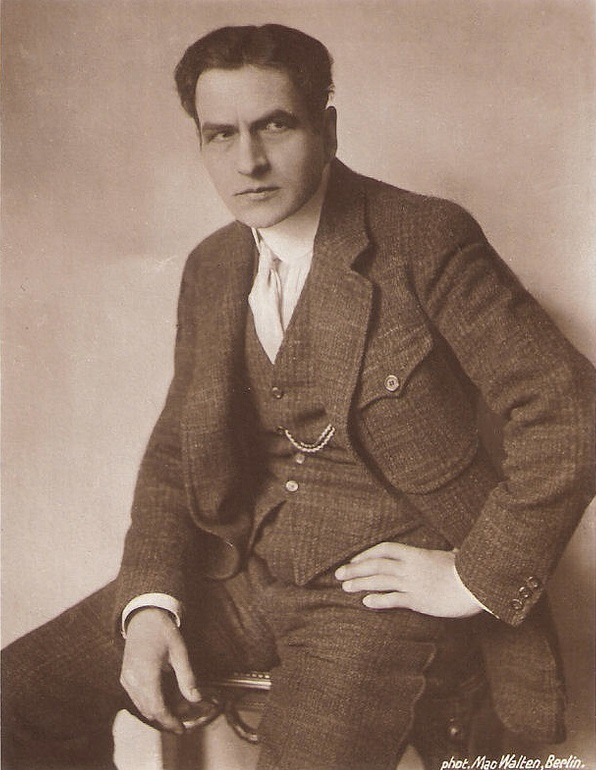
- Decarli, c. 1917
- Born: Bruno Alfred Franz Eduard Schmidt; 15 March 1877; Dresden, German Empire
- Died: 31 March 1950 (aged 73); Tiverton, United Kingdom
- Occupation: Actor
- Years active: 1916–1940

Bruno Decarli (15 March 1877 – 31 March 1950) was a German stage and film actor.

He was born Bruno Alfred Franz Eduard Schmidt in Dresden and began his career as a stage actor before transitioning to film. He died in Tiverton, United Kingdom, at the age of 73.

== Selected filmography ==
- The Wandering Light (1916)
- Fear (1917)
- The Love of Hetty Raimond (1917)
- The Man in the Mirror (1917)
- Life Is a Dream (1917)
- Der Richter (1917)
- Das Maskenfest des Lebens (1918)
- The Salamander Ruby (1918)
- The Sign of Guilt (1918)
- The Homecoming of Odysseus (1918)
- The Victors (1918)
- The Ringwall Family (1918)
- Jettatore (1919)
- Sins of the Parents (1919)
- Uriel Acosta (1920)
- De bruut (1922)
- Fridericus Rex (1922)
- Revenge of the Bandits (1922)
- One Glass of Water (1923)
- Victoria (1935)
- Das Herz der Königin (1940)

== Bibliography ==
- Jung, Uli & Schatzberg, Walter. Beyond Caligari: The Films of Robert Wiene. Berghahn Books, 1999.
