= Helga Molander =

German actress (1896–1986)

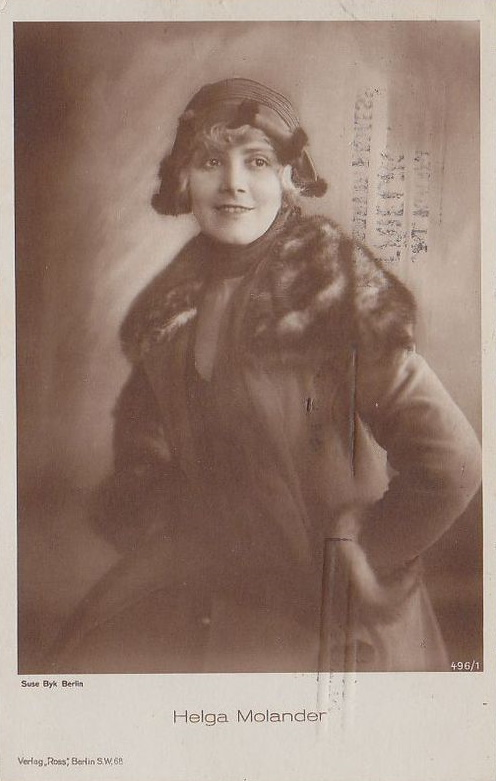
- Molander, ca. 1920
- Born: Ruth Werner; 19 March 1896; Königshütte, Silesia, Germany (present-day Chorzów, Poland)
- Died: 1986 (aged 89–90)
- Occupation: Actress
- Years active: 1918–1930
- Spouses: Eduard Eysenck (divorced); Max Glass
- Children: Hans Eysenck

Helga Molander (born Ruth Werner; 19 March 1896 – 1986), was a German actress and mother of Hans Eysenck.

== Life ==
Helga Molander was born in Königshütte, Upper Silesia, then Germany, to Jewish parents. She began her artistic career in 1918 at the Trianon Theater in Berlin. During the twenties, she performed in a number of silent movies. She played major roles in the productions of the Berlin film producer and director Max Glass in films such as Der Mann mit der Eisernen Maske (Man with the Iron Mask) and Bob und Mary.

With the advent of the Nazi times in Germany, Helga Molander left for France, then to Brazil and then to the United States. In 1957, she married Max Glass. Helga Molander is the mother of psychologist Hans Eysenck.

== Filmography ==
- The Sign of Guilt (1918)
- Der Weg der Grete Lessen (1919)
- Revenge Is Mine (1919)
- Verrat und Sühne (1919)
- The Gambler (1919)
- Anders als die Andern (1919)
- Der Ruf aus dem Jenseits (1920)
- Christian Wahnschaffe (1920)
- Love at the Wheel (1921)
- The Terror of the Red Mill (1921)
- Sappho (1921)
- Opfer der Liebe (1921)
- Rose of the Asphalt Streets (1922)
- Die sündige Vestalin (1922)
- Der alte Gospodar (1922)
- Bob and Mary (1923)
- Der Mann mit der eisernen Maske (1923)
- If You Have an Aunt (1925)
- The Man Who Sold Himself (1925)
- Three Waiting Maids (1925)
- The Three Mannequins (1926)
- The Man Without Sleep (1926)
- The Tragedy of a Lost Soul (1927)
- Queen Louise (1928, 2 Parts)
- The Schorrsiegel Affair (1928)
