= Gisèle Pascal =

French actress

- Born: Gisèle Marie Madeleine Tallone; 17 September 1921; Cannes, France
- Died: 2 February 2007 (aged 85); Nîmes, France
- Years active: 1942-1992
- Spouse(s): Raymond Pellegrin (1955-2007)
- Children: 1

Gisèle Pascal (17 September 1921 – 2 February 2007) was a French actress and a former lover of Rainier III, Prince of Monaco.

She was born Gisèle Marie Madeleine Tallone at Cannes, France. Her first movie role was in 1942's L'Arlésienne.

For six years, she was involved in a relationship with Prince Rainier, and lived together in a villa in Saint-Jean-Cap-Ferrat. Princess Antoinette, Baroness of Massy, Rainier's sister, seeking to obtain the throne of Monaco for her own son, spread malicious rumors that Pascal was incapable of bearing children. A contemplated marriage was called off when a medical examination mistakenly reported that she was infertile.

Pascal subsequently married actor Raymond Pellegrin on 8 October 1955 and had a daughter, Pascale Pellegrin, on 12 September 1962.

== Stage credits ==
- Amour, Délices et orgues (also known as Collège Swing) (1947)
- Véronique (1949)
- Boum sur Paris (1954)

== Partial filmography ==
- L'Arlésienne (1942) - Vivette
- The Beautiful Adventure (1942) - Hélène de Trévillac
- Two Timid Souls (1943) - Une des jeunes filles
- La Vie de bohème (1945) - Musette
- Lunegarde (1946) - Élisabeth de Lunegarde
- Madame et son flirt (1946) - Claudette Sauvaget
- Les J3 (1946) - Mademoiselle Bravard - la prof de philo
- Dropped from Heaven (1946) - Madeleine
- Loves, Delights and Organs (1947) - Micheline
- Last Refuge (1947) - Antoinette Baron
- After Love (1947) - Germaine By
- Mademoiselle Has Fun (1948) - Christine Gibson
- The Nude Woman (1949) - Loulou
- The Chocolate Girl (1949) - Benjamine Lapistolle
- Véronique (1950) - Estelle
- Beautiful Love (1951) - Suzanne Gérard-Moulin
- Endless Horizons (1953) - Hélène Boucher
- Boum sur Paris (1953) - Giselle Pascal
- Royal Affairs in Versailles (1954) - Louise de la Vallière
- Women Without Hope (1954) - Marie-Thérèse Langeac
- Fire Under Her Skin (1954) - Thérèse Rabou
- Madonna of the Sleeping Cars (1955) - Lady Diana Wyndham
- Mademoiselle from Paris (1955) - Micheline Bertier
- If Paris Were Told to Us (1956) - Comtesse de G...
- Pity for the Vamps (1956) - Jany Cristal-Davis
- Sylviane de mes nuits (1957) - Gaby Lemontier
- Ça n'arrive qu'aux vivants (1959) - Anne Brunier
- Le Masque de fer (1962) - Mme de Chaulmes
- Seul... à corps perdu (1964) - Lydia Simon
- Secret World (1969) - Florence
- Un caso di coscienza (1970) - Rosaria
- At the Top of the Stairs (1983) - Rose
- Les Compères (1983) - Louise
- The Public Woman (1984) - Gertrude
- Juillet en septembre (1988) - Madame Dewacker
