= List of French films of 1921 =

A list of films produced in France in 1921:

Title	Director	Cast	Genre	Notes
Asmodée à Paris	Chaudy			
Bénitou	Albert Durec			
Blanchette	René Hervil	Pauline Johnson, Léon Mathot, Thérèse Kolb	Drama	
Cendrillon (1921 film)	Charles Maudru		Comedy drama	
Chantelouve	Georges Monca			
Chicinette et compagnie	Henri Desfontaines			
El Dorado	Marcel L'Herbier	Ève Francis, Jaque Catelain		
Fièvre	Louis Delluc	Ève Francis, Edmund Van Daele	Drama	
Gigolette (1921 film)	Henri Pouctal			
Gustave est médium	Louis Feuillade	Georges Biscot, Blanche Montel	Comedy	
L'épingle rouge	Edouard-Emile Violet	Tsin Hou, Simone Vaudry	Drama	
L'assommoir	Maurice de Marsan, Charles Maudru			
L'Atlantide	Jacques Feyder	Jean Angelo, Georges Melchior	Adventure	
L'autre	Roger de Châteleux			
L'aviateur masqué	Robert Péguy			
L' infante à la rose	Henry Houry		Drama	
L'orpheline	Louis Feuillade			
La brute	Daniel Bompard			
La Maison Vide	Raymond Bernard	Andre Brabant, Pierre Alcover		
La Mort du Soleil	Germaine Dulac			
La nuit de la Saint-Jean	Robert Saidreau	Jean Dax, Lucien Duboscq	Drama	
Le Reve	Jacques de Baroncelli	Andree Brabant, Gabriel Signoret		
La terre	André Antoine	Armand Bour, René Alexandre	Drama	
La vivante épingle	Jacques Robert			
Le cœur magnifique	Séverin-Mars, Jean Legrand			
Le Coffret de Jade	Léon Poirier			
Le double	Alexandre Ryder			
Le Gardian	Joë Hamman	Joe Hamman, Gaston Jacquet		
Le logis de l'horreur	Julien Duvivier	Jeanne Helbling, Hugues de Bagratide		
Le méchant homme	Charles Maudru			
Le pauvre village	Jean Hervé			
Le pendentif	Pière Colombier			
Le Père Goriot	Jacques de Baroncelli	Gabriel Signoret, Claude France		
Le Roi de Camargue	André Hugon	Elmire Vautier, Charles de Rochefort		
Le sept de trèfle	René Navarre			
Les ailes s'ouvrent	Guy Du Fresnay			
Les deux soldats	Jean Hervé	Armand Caratis, Maurice Escande, Daniel Mendaille	Drama	
Les lumières du cœur	Edmond Van Daële			
Les Roquevillard	Julien Duvivier	Maxime Desjardins, Edmond Van Daële		
Les trois lys	Henri Desfontaines			
Les Trois Mousquetaires	Henri Diamont-Bergere	Aimé Simon-Girard, Henri Rollan	Adventure	
Mathias Sandorf	Henri Fescourt	Romuald Joubé, Yvette Andréyor, Jean Toulout	Adventure	
Monsieur Ledibois propriétaire	Pière Colombier			
Parisette	Louis Feuillade	Sandra Milovanoff, Georges Biscot	Drama	Film serial
Prométhée... banquier	Marcel L'Herbier	Gabriel Signoret, Ève Francis	Drama	
Rose de Nice	Maurice Challiot, Alexandre Ryder	Jean-Max, Suzanne Delve		
The Three Masks	Henry Krauss	Henry Krauss, Henri Rollan, Charlotte Barbier-Krauss	Drama	
The Two Girls	Louis Feuillade	Sandra Milovanoff, Alice Tissot	Drama	
Un cri dans l'abîme	Renée Carl			
Un drame sous Napoléon	Gérard Bourgeois			
Villa Destin	Marcel L'Herbier	Saint-Granier, Alice Field		
Worthless Woman	André Hugon	Suzanne Talba, Jose Duraney		

== See also ==
- 1921 in France
