= Nitchevo =

Nitchevo may refer to:

- Nitchevo (1926 film), a French silent film
- Nitchevo (1936 film), a French sound remake
