= The Three Masks =

The Three Masks may refer to:

- Les Trois Masques (The Three Masks), a 1908 play by Charles Méré
- The Three Masks (1929 film), a French film, based on the play
- The Three Masks (1921 film), a silent French film, based on the play
