= André Cornélis =

André Cornélis may refer to:

- André Cornélis (1918 film), a French silent film
- André Cornélis (1927 film), a French silent film
- The Story of André Cornélis, a novel by Paul Bourget
