= Life (1928 film) =

1928 film

- Directed by: Adelqui Migliar
- Written by: Joacquim Dicenta (play); Adelqui Migliar
- Produced by: Adelqui Migliar
- Starring: Adelqui Migliar; Marie Ault; Manuela Del Rio; Marcel Vibert
- Production company: Whitehall Films
- Distributed by: New Era Films
- Release date: December 1928
- Running time: 7,147 feet
- Country: United Kingdom
- Languages: Silent; English intertitles

Life is a 1928 British silent drama film, which was directed by Adelqui Migliar and starred Migliar, Marie Ault and Marcel Vibert. It was based on the 1895 play Juan José by Joaquín Dicenta. The film was made by Whitehall Films. While the company's new studio was constructed at Elstree, the film was shot on location in Spain.

== Cast ==
- Adelqui Migliar as Juan José
- Marie Ault as Isidora
- Marcel Vibert as Paco
- Manuela Del Rio as Rosa
- José Lucio as Andrés
- Denise Lorys as Tournela

== Bibliography ==
- Low, Rachel. The History of British Film: Volume IV, 1918–1929. Routledge, 1997.
- Thatcher Gies, David. The Theatre in Nineteenth-Century Spain. Cambridge University Press, 2005.
