= Little Jacques =

Little Jacques may refer to:

- Little Jacques (1923 film), a 1923 French silent drama film
- Little Jacques (1934 film), a 1934 French drama film
- Little Jacques (1953 film), a 1953 French drama film
