= Atlantis (1930 film) =

1930 French film by E. A. Dupont

- Directed by: Ewald André Dupont; Jean Kemm
- Written by: Victor Kendall; Pierre Maudru
- Based on: The Berg by Ernest Raymond
- Produced by: Jacques Haïk
- Starring: Maxime Desjardins; Alice Field; Constant Rémy
- Cinematography: Charles Rosher
- Music by: John Reynders
- Production companies: British International Pictures; Les Etablissements Jacques Haïk
- Distributed by: Mappemonde Film
- Release date: 26 September 1930
- Running time: 90 minutes
- Country: United Kingdom
- Language: French

Atlantis is a 1930 drama film directed by Ewald André Dupont and Jean Kemm and starring Maxime Desjardins, Alice Field and Constant Rémy. The film was made as French version of the British film Atlantic, produced by British International Pictures at Elstree Studios. Such Multiple-language versions were common in the early years of sound before dubbing became a more established practice. The film was released in four versions, English, German, French and silent for theatres not yet converted to sound. Like the original version, it is based on the 1929 West End play The Berg by Ernest Raymond.

== Synopsis ==
A prestigious luxury liner, the Atlantis, strikes an iceberg and sinks during its maiden voyage across the Atlantic Ocean. The various passengers are forced to come to a reckoning with their impending fate.

== Cast ==
- Maxime Desjardins as Janvry
- Alice Field as Madame Lambert
- Constant Rémy as Lambert
- Marcel Vibert as Goulven
- Jeanne Kervich as Madame Janvry
- Hélène Darly as Renée Janvry
- Harry Krimer as Monsieur de Trémont
- Paul Escoffier as Le commandant
- Gaston Dupray as Vilbert
- Léon Belières as Clarel
- André Burgère as René Janvry
- René Montis as Un officier

== Bibliography ==
- Goble, Alan. The Complete Index to Literary Sources in Film. Walter de Gruyter, 1999.
- Murphy, Robert. Directors in British and Irish Cinema: A Reference Companion. Bloomsbury Publishing, 2019.
- St. Pierre, Paul Matthew. E.A. Dupont and his Contribution to British Film: Varieté, Moulin Rouge, Piccadilly, Atlantic, Two Worlds, Cape Forlorn. Fairleigh Dickinson University Press, 2010
