= Patrie =

Patrie (French "fatherland") or La Patrie (The fatherland) from the Latin patria may refer to:

Patrie

- Patrie!, 1869 play by Victorien Sardou about the rising of the Dutch Geuzen at the end of the 16th century
- Patrie!, a popular 1886 opera by Paladihle based on the play
- Patrie (1917 film), based on the play
- Patrie (1946 film), also based on the play
- Patrie (airship), 1906
- French battleship Patrie, launched in 1903

La Patrie

- La Patrie, Quebec, a municipality of about 750 people in Le Haut-Saint-François Regional County Municipality, in Quebec, Canada.
- La Patrie (Canadian newspaper), Montreal newspaper 1879-1978
- La Patrie (French newspaper), Parisian financial newspaper 1841
