= Atlantic (film) =

1929 British film by Ewald André Dupont

- Theatrical release poster
- Directed by: Ewald André Dupont
- Written by: Victor Kendall
- Based on: The Berg by Ernest Raymond
- Produced by: Ewald André Dupont; John Maxwell; James Scura
- Starring: Franklin Dyall; Madeleine Carroll
- Cinematography: Charles Rosher
- Edited by: Emile de Ruelle
- Music by: John Reynders
- Color process: Black and white
- Production company: British International Pictures
- Distributed by: Wardour Films (UK); Columbia Pictures (US)
- Release date: 15 November 1929
- Running time: 90 minutes (US); 87 minutes (UK)
- Country: United Kingdom
- Languages: Sound (All-Talking); English
- Budget: $250,000
- Box office: $500,000 (est.)

Atlantic (also known as Titanic: Disaster in the Atlantic for its home video release) is a British all-talking sound drama film from 1929 directed and produced by Ewald André Dupont and starring Franklin Dyall and Madeleine Carroll. Originally, two versions were made: the English and German-language version Atlantik were shot simultaneously. Subsequently, the production of a French version (Atlantis) began in spring 1930 using different footage and partially an altered storyline with a different director. The fourth version was released as a silent film. The story was taken from the West End play The Berg by Ernest Raymond. It was one of the most expensive films of 1929.

== Plot ==
Atlantic (1929)

Atlantic is a drama film based on the sinking of the RMS Titanic and set aboard a fictional ship, called the Atlantic. The main plotline revolves around a group of friends; a man named Mr. Tate Hughes who has a shipboard affair with a fellow passenger, which is eventually discovered by his wife, an elderly couple, the Rools, who are on their anniversary cruise. Along with a priest, a young couple named Monica and Lawrence, and 3 middle aged Bachelors Dandy, Maj, and Pointer. Midway across the Atlantic Ocean, the Atlantic strikes an iceberg and is damaged to the point where it is sinking into the Atlantic. Lanchestor, one of the officers onboard confides in Mr. Rool that the ship is sinking and Mr. Rool slowly tells his friends. A shortage of lifeboats causes the crew to only allow women and children in (though the captain allows a few men to take to the last remaining boats as the disaster reaches its zenith) and many couples are separated. Mr. Tate Hughes feels remorse for his infidelity as Dandy feels hopelessness kick in while The Priest tries to comfort his friends. Mrs. Rool refuses to leave her husband despite his protests, and after the boats are gone all the passengers including The Rools, Mr. Tate Hughes, Dandy, Maj, and Pointer gather in the lounge and sing "Nearer, My God, to Thee" as a group of men play poker the Atlantic sinks into the ocean. The final scenes depict a group of passengers saying the Lord's Prayer in a flooding lounge led by the priest. The Lounge floods as the ship goes under water, and the lights go out.

== Cast ==
- Franklin Dyall as John Rool
- Madeleine Carroll as Monica
- John Stuart as Lawrence
- Ellaline Terriss as Alice Rool
- Monty Banks as Dandy
- Donald Calthrop as Pointer
- John Longden as Lanchester
- Arthur Hardy as Maj Boldy
- Helen Haye as Clara Tate-Hughes
- D.A. Clarke-Smith as Freddie Tate-Hughes
- Joan Barry as Betty Tate-Hughes
- Francis Lister as Padre
- Sydney Lynn as Captain Collins
- Syd Crossley as telegraphist
- Dino Galvani as steward
- Danny Green as passenger
- Fanny Wright as passenger

== Production ==
An urban legend claimed for many years that the movie was filmed aboard the White Star Line ship RMS Majestic. However, this is probably untrue, as the White Star Line would never have permitted their current flagship to be used as a cinematic stand-in for the worst disaster in the company's history. The origin of this legend may be due to the fact that early on in the film, there is a short scene where three of the characters meet on a grand staircase. The "set" is almost identical to the first class entrance & staircase of either Majestic or her sister ship, SS Leviathan. However, the fact that the "set" is vast and would have been costly to build, yet appears only once in the film, does make it plausible that this scene was filmed on board one of the two ships.

It is known that some scenes were actually filmed on board a P&O ship, the Mooltan. Indeed, the film was originally made as Titanic but after lawsuits it was renamed Atlantic. These lawsuits were initiated by the White Star Line, which owned the RMS Titanic, and which was still in operation at the time. (White Star had in fact also owned a liner called SS Atlantic which was lost in 1873 with a heavy loss of life, but at the distance of half a century it was no longer considered as immediately traumatising as the Titanic.) As well, the name Atlantic is sort of ubiquitous as numerous vessels, large and small, English language and other, have held the name. The final scene of the movie was filmed as a shot of the liner sinking, but it was removed at the last minute for fear of upsetting Titanic survivors. This footage is now considered lost.

=== Sound ===
Atlantic was one of the first British films made with the soundtrack optically recorded on the film (sound-on-film), and was Germany's first sound movie feature. In England, it was released in both sound and silent prints. The French version was the fourth French feature with sound-on-film.

As the first sound film about the sinking of the Titanic, it is also the first to feature the song "Nearer, My God to Thee," which is played by the ship's band and sung by passengers and crew.

== Reception ==
The Observer praised the use of sound in the film, though complained that of dialogue "too close...to literary tradition" and "flabby acting." In a retrospective review, David Cairns claimed that the film "became something of a laughing-stock in Britain" due to the actors speaking "as slowly as possible...his [Dupont's] desire to inflect each syllable with suitable weight and portent robbed the film of any sense of urgency."

== See also ==
- Foreign Language Version
- List of films about the RMS Titanic
- List of early sound feature films (1926–1929)
