= Robert Ancelin =

French actor and theater director

- Born: 22 November 1898; Poitiers (Vienne)
- Died: 25 January 1986 (aged 87); 13th arrondissement of Paris
- Occupation(s): Theater director, actor
- Spouse: Fanély Revoil

Robert Ancelin (22 November 1898 – 25 January 1986) was a French actor and theater director. He was married with the soprano Fanély Revoil from 1937 to 1942 and directing manager of the Théâtre de la Porte-Saint-Martin from 1940 to 1949.

== Filmography ==
- 1930 : Hai-Tang by Richard Eichberg and Jean Kemm as Boris Ivanoff
- 1931 : Y'en a pas deux comme Angélique by Roger Lion as Jean Larivière
- 1931 : About an Inquest by Robert Siodmak and Henri Chomette as Klate
- 1932 : Y'a erreur by Joseph Tzipine (short film)
- 1932 : Love and Luck by Monty Banks as Jackson
- 1932 : Clochard by Robert Péguy as Poum
- 1932 : The Last Blow by Jacques de Baroncelli as Lucien
- 1933 : La Poule by René Guissart as Paul Cellier
- 1933 : Vilaine histoire by Christian-Jaque (short film) as the amateur detective
- 1933 : L'Empreinte sanglante by Jean Mamy (short film) as the amateur detective
- 1933 : Deux blondes by Jean Mamy (short film) as the amateur detective
- 1933 : Le Client du numéro 16 by Jean Mamy (short film)
- 1933 : Ce n'est pas lui, anonymous direction (short film)
- 1933 : L'Atroce Menace by Christian-Jaque (short film) as the amateur detective
- 1934 : Crime d'amour by Roger Capellani (short film)
- 1934 : Lui...ou...elle by Roger Capellani (court métrage) as the amateur detective
- 1935 : Sans elle by M. Deleric (short film)
- 1935 : La Bandera by Julien Duvivier as the lieutenant
- 1936 : Prince of the Six Days by Robert Vernay as Teddy, the barman
- 1938 : Café de Paris by Yves Mirande and Georges Lacombe
- 1939 : La Loi du Nord by Jacques Feyder

== Theatre ==
Comedian

- 1930: Arsène Lupin banquier, operetta, libretto Yves Mirande, couplets Albert Willemetz, composer Marcel Lattes after Maurice Leblanc, Théâtre des Bouffes-Parisiens
- 1942: Occupe-toi d'Amélie by Georges Feydeau, directed by Robert Ancelin, Théâtre de la Porte-Saint-Martin
- 1943: Pour avoir Adrienne by Louis Verneuil, directed by Robert Ancelin, Théâtre de la Porte-Saint-Martin

Theatre director

- 1940: Le Bossu by Paul Féval and Auguste Anicet-Bourgeois, Théâtre de la Porte-Saint-Martin
- 1941: Le Maître de forges by Georges Ohnet, Théâtre de la Porte-Saint-Martin
- 1941: The Two Orphans by Adolphe d'Ennery and Eugène Cormon, Théâtre de la Porte-Saint-Martin
- 1941: Mon curé chez les riches by Clément Vautel, Théâtre de la Porte-Saint-Martin
- 1941: La Porteuse de pain by Xavier de Montépin, Théâtre de la Porte-Saint-Martin
- 1941: Le Contrôleur des wagons-lits and Les Surprises du divorce by Alexandre Bisson, Théâtre de la Porte-Saint-Martin
- 1941: Les Deux Gosses by Pierre Decourcelle, Théâtre de la Porte-Saint-Martin
- 1942: La Bouquetière des Innocents by Auguste Anicet-Bourgeois and Ferdinand Dugué, Théâtre de la Porte-Saint-Martin
- 1942: Occupe-toi d'Amélie! by Georges Feydeau, Théâtre de la Porte-Saint-Martin
- 1942: Et moi je te dis qu'elle t'a fait de l'œil by Maurice Hennequin and Pierre Veber, Théâtre de la Porte-Saint-Martin
- 1943: Pour avoir Adrienne by Louis Verneuil, Théâtre de la Porte-Saint-Martin
- 1943: Mon oncle et mon curé by Jean de La Brète, Théâtre de la Porte-Saint-Martin
- 1943: Le Pavillon d'Asnières by Charles Méré after Georges Simenon, Théâtre de la Porte-Saint-Martin
- 1943: Mon curé chez les riches after the novel by Clément Vautel, Théâtre de la Porte-Saint-Martin
- 1945: A Flea in Her Ear by Georges Feydeau, Théâtre de la Porte-Saint-Martin
- 1948: Un p'tit mari en or by André Mouëzy-Éon, Théâtre de la Porte-Saint-Martin
