= Paul Velsa =

French actor (1905–1944)

- Born: Paul Isaac Welsa; 29 December 1905; 12th arrondissement of Paris, France
- Died: 20 May 1944 (aged 38); Auschwitz, German occupied Poland
- Other name: Paul Velsa
- Occupation: Actor
- Years active: 1928–1938 (film)

Paul Isaac Welsa (known professionally as Paul Velsa; 29 December 1905 – 20 May 1944) was a French stage and film actor. He appeared in more than thirty films between 1928 and 1938.

== Biography ==
Paul Isaac Welsa was born on at the maternity ward of the Hôpital Saint-Antoine in the 12th arrondissement of Paris to Maurice and Jeanne Welsa (née Aronowitz), both of Polish-Jewish origin. His first known performance on stage was at the age of 17 at the Théâtre des Ternes in February 1923. He appeared onscreen, nine years later, as Corporal Bourrache in the silent film Tire-au-flanc; a screen adaptation of the 1904 play of the same name by André Mouëzy-Éon, directed by Jean Renoir.

After fifteen years spent on both theatre and film stages, his career ended during the German occupation of France in World War II. A victim of the anti-Jewish laws of the Vichy government, he was arrested shortly after his father's death and detained at Drancy internment camp from 4 May 1944, then deported in convoy no. 73 of 15 May 1944 to Kaunas in Lithuania. At the time of his arrest, he lived at 47 rue Chauvelot in Malakoff, Hauts-de-Seine. He had been married since 21 June 1928 to Rachel Joël.

He was transferred from Lithuania to Auschwitz concentration camp where he died on 20 May 1944 at the age of 38.

Paul Velsa appears on the Wall of Names at the Mémorial de la Shoah in Paris (slab no. 42, column no. 14, row no. 3)

== Selected filmography ==
- Captain Fracasse (1929)
- I'll Be Alone After Midnight (1931)
- Heart of Paris (1932)
- A Telephone Call (1932)
- The Crime of Bouif (1933)
- Mademoiselle Josette, My Woman (1933)
- The Crisis is Over (1934)
- Nitchevo (1936)
- The Brighton Twins (1936)
- Boissière (1937)
- Widow's Island (1937)
- The Two Schemers (1938)

== Bibliography ==
- Alpi, Deborah Lazaroff. Robert Siodmak: A Biography, with Critical Analyses of His Films Noirs and a Filmography of All His Works. McFarland, 1998.
