= Marcelle Chantal =

French actress (1901–1960)

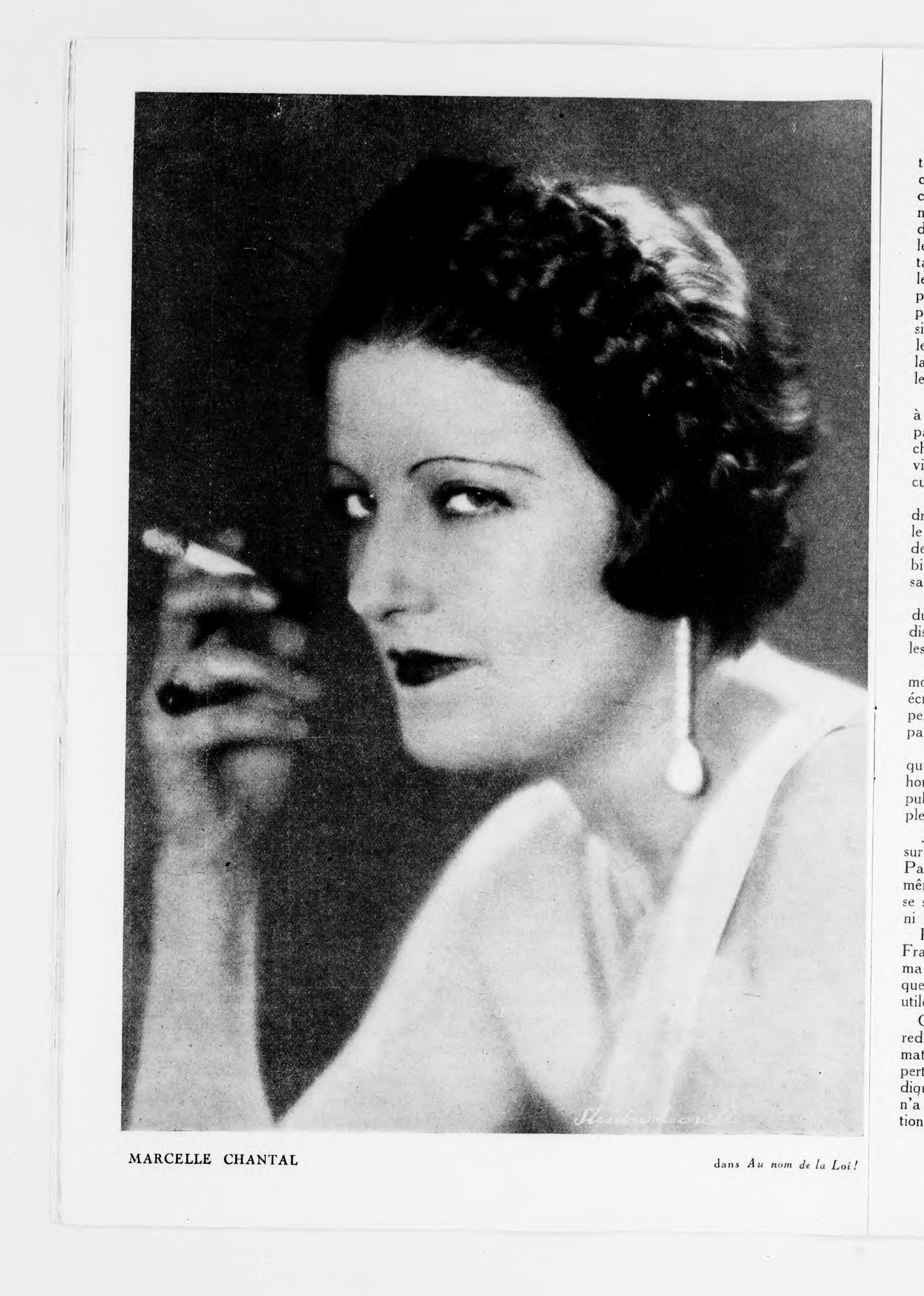
- Born: 9 February 1901; Paris, France
- Died: 11 March 1960 (aged 59); Paris, France
- Other name: Marcelle Jenny Chantal Pannier
- Occupations: Film actress Stage actress
- Years active: 1920–1950 (film)
- Spouse: Jefferson Davis Cohn (m. 1921; died 1951)

Marcelle Chantal (1901–1960) was a French stage and film actress. Chantal appeared in a number of leading roles in films such as Maurice Tourneur's In the Name of the Law (1932). Early in her career she married British banker Jefferson Davis Cohn and was billed as Marcelle Jefferson-Cohn. She was the daughter of Georges Favrel.

== Selected filmography ==
- Le Carnaval des vérités (1920)
- The Queen's Necklace (1929)
- Tenderness (1930)
- The Indictment (1931)
- The Devil's Holiday (1931)
- In the Name of the Law (1932)
- The Orderly (1933)
- Amok (1934)
- Antonia (1935)
- The Phantom Gondola (1936)
- Nitchevo (1936)
- A Romance in Flanders (1937)
- Widow's Island (1937)
- The Lafarge Case (1938)
- Rasputin (1938)
- Girls in Distress (1939)
- Fantomas Against Fantomas (1949)
- Julie de Carneilhan (1950)
- Chéri (1950)
