= Gabrielle Robinne =

French actress (1886–1980)

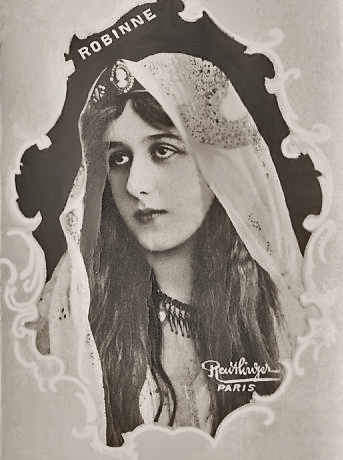
- Born: 1 July 1886; Montluçon, Allier, French Third Republic
- Died: 18 December 1980 (aged 94); Saint-Cloud, Hauts-de-Seine, France
- Occupation: Actress
- Years active: 1904–1973
- Spouse: René Alexandre (m. 1912; died 1946)

Gabrielle Anna Charlotte Robinne (1 July 1886 – 18 December 1980) was a French stage and film actress whose career spanned over sixty years.

== Career ==
Born in Montluçon, Allier, France, Robinne was a pupil of Maurice de Féraudy at the Paris Conservatory. In 1904 she entered the company of Sarah Bernhardt and for a year she joined the Theatre Michel in St. Petersburg, Russia. Her career blossomed while performing at the Comédie-Française in 1907 and she became a sociétaire in 1924 and remained there until 1938. She made her film debut in the 1906 Segundo de Chomón-directed short Le troubadour. She is often regarded by critics to be the first French star of the silent film era.

Gabrielle Robinne alternated her time between the stage and film. Between 1906 and 1973, Robinne would appear in nearly fifty films. Her last film appearance was a role in the 1973 Stanislav Stanojevic-directed drama Le journal d'un suicidé (English release title: Diary of a Suicide).

== Personal life and death ==
Gabrielle Robinne was married to actor René Alexandre from 1912 until his death in 1946. She never remarried. She died in Saint-Cloud, Hauts-de-Seine, France in 1980 at the age of 94.

== Legacy ==
In 2006, after several years of restoration, the local theatre in Robinne's home village of Montluçon was renamed the Théâtre Municipal Gabrielle Robinne and was opened to the public by actress Audrey Tautou. Renovated at a cost of €2.5 million, the theatre was named in Robinne's honor and was mainly financed by the State, the General Council and the Regional Council. The theatre was founded in 1912 and opened 17 January 1914, with Robinne present on the day of the first opening.

For her work in the French arts, Gabrielle Robinne was made an Officer of the Legion of Honor.

== Selected filmography ==
| Year | Title | Role | Notes |
|---|---|---|---|
| 1908 | The Assassination of the Duke of Guise | Marquise de Noirmoutier, maîtresse du duc | |
| 1913 | Coeur de femme | Gabrielle Normand | |
| 1913 | Plus fort que la haine | Gina Gioverni | |
| 1913 | La leçon du gouffre | Gabrielle de Lanssay | |
| 1913 | Le roi du bagne | Germaine Pradier | |
| 1914 | La lutte pour la vie | Claire Préval | |
| 1916 | Blessure d'amour | Marguerite | |
| 1916 | Zyte | | |
| 1917 | La proie | | |
| 1917 | La chanson du feu | | |
| 1917 | Le dédale | | |
| 1917 | Le vol suprême | Hervinde de Montclard | |
| 1917 | La bonne hôtesse | | |
| 1917 | La vie d'une reine | | |
| 1918 | La route du devoir | | |
| 1918 | L'expiation | | |
| 1919 | Les larmes du pardon | | |
| 1919 | Le calvaire d'une reine | | |
| 1922 | Destinée | | |
| 1927 | Lucile | | |
| 1938 | Rasputin | Tsarine-mère | |
| 1938 | Adrienne Lecouvreur | La Duclos | |
| 1939 | Girls in Distress | Le mère d'Yvette | |
| 1946 | The Captain | La supérieure | |
| 1947 | Rendezvous in Paris | Lady Mermor | |
| 1947 | Hyménée | Mme d'Aubarède | |
| 1963 | Prostitution | Honorine | |
| 1973 | Le Journal d'un suicidé | La vieille dame | (final film role) |
