= François Rozet =

Canadian actor

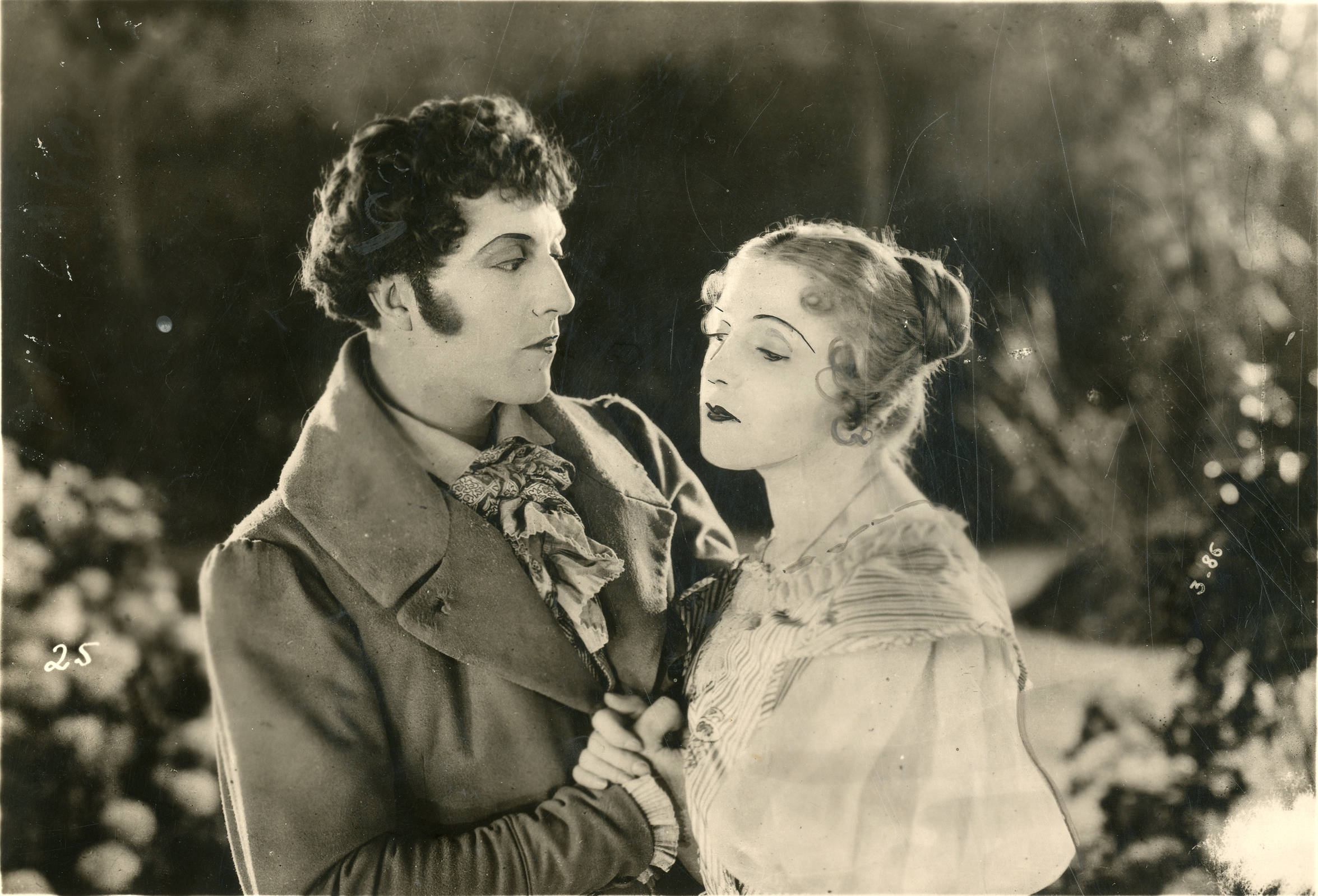
- Born: 25 March 1899
- Died: 8 April 1994 (aged 94–95)

François Rozet, OC (25 March 1899 – 8 April 1994) was a French-born Canadian actor.

Rozet was born March 25, 1899, in Villars-les-Dombes, Ain, Rhône-Alpes, France and died in Montréal, Québec, Canada.

In 1971, he was made an Officer of the Order of Canada "for his contribution to French theatre".

== Filmography ==
Year	Title	Role	Notes
1925	Les Misérables	Marius	
1928	Madame Récamier	Le prince de Prusse	
1928	Minuit, place Pigalle	Le comte Serge de Varitza	
1928	Cousin Bette	Le comte Wenceslas Steinbock	
1929	Trois Jeunes Filles nues	Maurice	
1929	La Glu	Marie-Pierre	
1929	Monte Cristo	Maximilien Morrel - le fils	
1929	The Three Masks	Paolo	
1933	Court Waltzes	Prince Albert	
1934	The Bread Peddler	Lucien Labroue	
1934	Sapho	Jean Gaussin	
1935	L'heureuse aventure	Robert Legrand	
1940	Facing Destiny	Le lieutenant	
1941	Notre-Dame de la Mouise	L'abbé	
1945	The Music Master (Le Père Chopin)	Jacques Dupont	
