= Stanislav Stanojevic =

Serbian film director

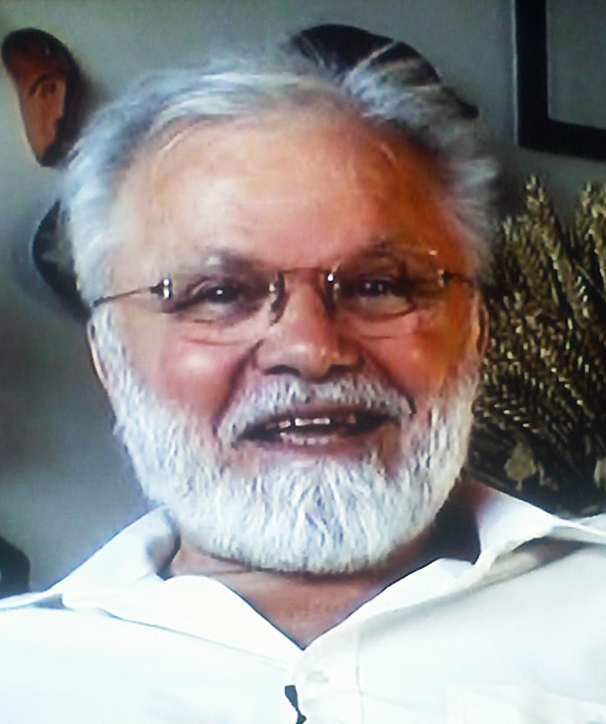
- Stanislav Stanojevic (2004)
- Born: 27 December 1938 (age 87); Belgrade, Serbia
- Occupation: Actor/director

Stanislav Stanojevic (born 27 December 1938) is a film director, screenwriter, and French actor. He has lived in Paris since 1966 and is also a writer.

== Filmography ==
Director

- 1971 : Le Journal d'un suicidé (with Sami Frey, Delphine Seyrig, Marie-France Pisier, Gabrielle Robinne)
- 1979 : Subversion
- 1984 : Illustres Inconnus
- 2007 : Mauve, le Tigre !

Screenwriter

- 1971 : Le Journal d'un suicidé

Acteur

- 1971 : Le Journal d'un suicidé
