= May 1909 Madrid City Council election =

Madrid City Council election Sunday, 2 May 1909
Partisan affiliation	Seats
Republicans	12
Conservatives	5
Social Defence	3
Liberals	1
Democrats	1

A municipal election took place in Madrid on Sunday, 2 May 1909, seeking to renew the 22 vacant posts of the City Council. This was the first municipal election celebrated under the 1907 Electoral Law of Antonio Maura, enacting compulsory voting.

== Results ==
There was no election in the district of Universidad as there was the same number of candidates than vacant councillors; and thus the candidates were proclaimed in accordance with the article 29 of the electoral law. The definitive results (grouped by partisan affiliation) resulted into 12 Republicans, 5 conservatives, 3 from the Social Defence, 1 liberal and 1 democrat.

The general turnout grew up until roughly a 70% of the electorate (manhood suffrage) thanks to the compulsory voting established in the Electoral Law, but it refuted the wrong perception Maura upheld about the until then disenfranchised masses supposedly being conservative, thus guaranteeing Conservative majorities.

The results of the election along those from the next election celebrated in December 1909 would turn the municipal group jointly integrated by Republicans and Socialists the largest in the council (with 23 members).

Elected councillors
District	Proclaimed elected candidates (partisan affiliation)	Votes
Centro	Bernardo Martín González (Conservative)	3,161
Hospicio	Luis Sainz de los Terreros (Social Defence)	2,706
Chamberí	No vacants/No election	-
Buenavista	Luis Martínez Kléiser (Social Defence)	3,087
Buenavista	Ricardo Rodríguez Vilariño (Republican)	2,753
Congreso	Juan Trasserra Conill (Republican)	3,523
Hospital	José Corona Pareja (Republican)	3,921
Hospital	Julio Pérez Guerra (Republican)	3,594
Hospital	Camilo Uceda de la Higuera (demócrata)	1,692
Inclusa	Facundo Dorado Díaz (Republican)	2,735
Inclusa	José Pascual Sevilla (Republican)	2,222
Inclusa	Alberto Aguilera y Arjona (Republican)	2,167
Inclusa	Carlos García Rodríguez (Conservative)	1,769
Latina	Joaquín Dicenta Benedicto (Republican)	4,911
Latina	José María de la Torre Murillo (Republican)	4,041
Latina	Silvestre Abellán García (Republican)	3,971
Latina	Andrés González Alberdi (Liberal)	2,604
Palacio	Prudencio Díaz Agero (Conservative)	4,208
Palacio	Antonio Gómez Vallejo (Conservative)	3,883
Palacio	Manuel de Carlos Colmenero (Social Defence)	3,611
Palacio	Manuel Benedicto Zabalza (Republican)	2,263
Universidad	Eduardo González Hoyos (Republican)	n/a
Universidad	Manuel Ramos Salas (Conservative)	n/a
