= Georges Lannes =

French actor (1895–1983)

- Born: Georges Henri Charles Abraham Lannes; 27 October 1895; Paris, France
- Died: 8 July 1983 (aged 87); Paris, France
- Occupation: Actor
- Years active: 1920-1962 (film)

Georges Lannes (27 October 1895 – 8 July 1983) was a French film actor who appeared in more than a hundred films during his career, including André Cornélis (1927).

== Selected filmography ==
- The Mysteries of Paris (1922)
- Little Jacques (1923)
- The Abbot Constantine (1925)
- André Cornélis (1927)
- The Queen's Necklace (1929)
- The Citadel of Silence (1937)
- S.O.S. Sahara (1938)
- Alexis, Gentleman Chauffeur (1938)
- Beautiful Star (1938)
- The Gutter (1938)
- Extenuating Circumstances (1939)
- There's No Tomorrow (1939)
- The Emigrant (1940)
- Narcisse (1940)
- The Murderer is Afraid at Night (1942)
- Macao (1942)
- The Crossroads (1942)
- The Snow on the Footsteps (1942)
- Don't Shout It from the Rooftops (1943)
- Death No Longer Awaits (1944)
- The Sea Rose (1946)
- That's Not the Way to Die (1946)
- The Fugitive (1947)
- Danger of Death (1947)
- The Barton Mystery (1949)
- King Pandora (1950)
- Mademoiselle Josette, My Woman (1950)
- The Night Is My Kingdom (1951)
- Never Two Without Three (1951)
- Sins of Paris (1953)
- The Contessa's Secret (1954)
- Stopover in Orly (1955)
- The Hotshot (1955)
- The Duratons (1955)
- The Whole Town Accuses (1956)
- Paris, Palace Hotel (1956)
- The Case of Doctor Laurent (1957)
- Sénéchal the Magnificent (1957)

== Bibliography ==
- Goble, Alan. The Complete Index to Literary Sources in Film. Walter de Gruyter, 1999.
