= The Lacquered Box =

1932 film

- Directed by: Jean Kemm
- Written by: Pierre Maudru; H. Fowler Mear; Brock Williams
- Based on: Black Coffee (play); 1930 play by Agatha Christie
- Produced by: Jacques Haïk
- Starring: René Alexandre
- Cinematography: Paul Cotteret
- Music by: Henri Verdun
- Production company: Les Établissements Jacques Haïk
- Distributed by: Les Établissements Jacques Haïk
- Release date: 15 July 1932
- Running time: 85 minutes
- Country: France
- Language: French

The Lacquered Box (French: Le Coffret de Laque) is a 1932 French crime film directed by Jean Kemm and starring Réné Alexandre. It was based on Agatha Christie's play Black Coffee which had been turned into a British film the previous year.

The film is the first sound adaptation of Agatha Christie’s work with known surviving copies.

== Plot ==
Fearing the theft of an important secret formula, the scientist Claud Amory (Maxime Desjardins) asks for help from Monsieur Préval (René Alexandre), director of the Sûreté. But when Amory is mysteriously poisoned inside his own home, the detective realizes the case is more serious than he had imagined and decides to investigate each of the suspects.

== Cast ==
In alphabetical order

- René Alexandre as Préval
- Maxime Desjardins as Claude Amory
- Maurice Varny as Richard Stenay
- Gaston Dupray as Gaston de Ravennes
- Danielle Darrieux as Henriette Stenay
- Alice Field as Lucie Stenay
- Marcel Vibert as Dr. Carelli
- André Laurent as Raynor
- Arbell as Antoine
- Isabelle Anderson as Marthe
- Jean Laurent as Dr. Dernault

== Bibliography ==
- Philippe Rège. Encyclopedia of French Film Directors, Volume 1. Scarecrow Press, 2009.
