= Germinal (1913 film) =

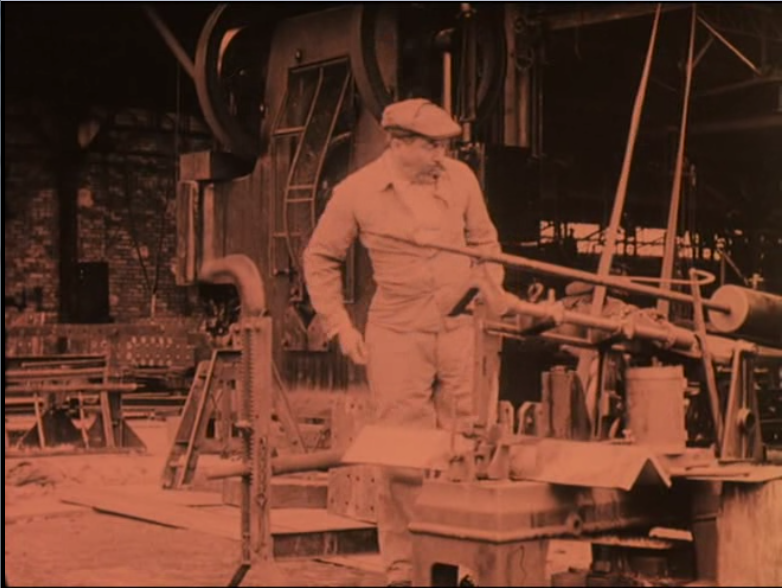
- Directed by: Albert Capellani
- Written by: Albert Capellani
- Based on: Germinal by Emile Zola
- Starring: Henry Krauss
- Cinematography: Louis Forestier, Pierre Trimbach
- Production company: Pathé Frères
- Release date: 1913
- Running time: 140 minutes
- Country: France
- Language: French

Germinal is a 1913 black and white silent French language French film written and directed by Albert Capellani. It was released in the United States in 1914 as Germinal; or, The Toll of Labor. It is an adaptation of the 1885 novel Germinal by Emile Zola. With a running time of 140 minutes, it is one of the first films produced with a length of over two hours.

== Synopsis ==
The year is 1863. Étienne Lantier gets work as a mineworker after having been fired from his job on the railroad for revolutionary behavior. Disheartened by the conditions in the mines, he returns to his revolutionary ideas and leads a strike of the mineworkers. Soldiers are brought in to quell the strike.

== Cast ==
- Henry Krauss: Étienne Lantier
- Auguste Mévisto: Catherine Maheu
- Albert Bras: Hennebeau
- Paul Escoffier: Henri Negrel
- Jeanne Cheirel: La Maheude
- Cécile Guyon: Cécile Hennebeau
- Marc Gérard: Bonnemort
- René Lefèvre-Bel : Félix
