= Georges Denola =

French filmmaker and actor

Georges Samson Denola (French: [dənɔla]; 29 August 1865, Paris, France – 3 March 1944, Neuilly-sur-Seine, France) was a French filmmaker and actor. His most notable film is La Jeunesse de Rocambole, released in 1913. As an actor, Georges Denola has been seen in L'Hirondelle et la Mésange (1920) and in La Fin du jour, released in 1939.

== Filmography (as director) ==
- 1908: Le Coup de fusil, short subject
- 1908: Charlotte Corday
- 1909: Chercheurs d'or
- 1910: Zizi la bouquetière
- 1910: Voleur d'amour
- 1910: Un homme habile
- 1910: Une gentille petite femme (Une petite femme bien douce)
- 1910: Le Gendarme sauve le voleur (Le Trimardeur)
- 1910: La Tournée du percepteur
- 1910: L'Une pour l'autre (Sœurs de lait)
- 1910: Le Revenant
- 1910: Les Larmes de l'enfant (Le Retour au foyer)
- 1910: Le Rendez-vous
- 1910: Promenade d'amour
- 1910: Pour les beaux yeux de la voisine
- 1910: Une heure d'oubli (La Pigeonne)
- 1910: Par un jour de carnaval
- 1910: Loin des yeux, loin du cœur
- 1910: L'Illusion (L'Illusion des yeux)
- 1910: L'Accident (L'Heureux accident)
- 1910: Fleur des maquis
- 1910: Les Fiancés de Colombine
- 1910: La Fête de Marguerite
- 1910: La Femme du saltimbanque
- 1910: La Faute du notaire
- 1910: L'Évasion de Vidocq
- 1910: Deux petits Jésus
- 1910: Au temps des grisettes
- 1910: Amour de page
- 1911: La Vénus d'Arles
- 1911: Une femme trop aimante
- 1911: Souris d'hôtel
- 1911: À qui l'héritière? (La Ruse de Miss Plumcake)
- 1911: Romain Kalbris
- 1911: Le Remords du juge
- 1911: Le Pot de confitures
- 1911: Philémon et Baucis
- 1911: Oiseau de printemps, hirondelle d'hiver
- 1911: Frisette, blanchisseuse de fin (La Note de la blanchisseuse)
- 1911: Galathée (Moderne Galathée)
- 1911: Mimi Pinson
- 1911: Fatale rencontre (La Lettre inachevée)
- 1911: L'Homme au grand manteau
- 1911: La Gouvernante
- 1911: La Fille du clown
- 1911: La Clémence d'Isabeau, princesse d'Héristal
- 1911: Le Chef d'œuvre
- 1911: La Tournée du docteur (Le Cabriolet du docteur)
- 1911: Les Bottes de Kouba
- 1911: La Bonté de Jacques V
- 1911: La Servante (La Bonne à tout faire)
- 1911: Bonaparte et Pichegru - 1804 (Bonaparte et Pichegru)
- 1911: L'Anniversaire de Mademoiselle Félicité
- 1911: L'Abîme
- 1912: La Voleuse d'enfants
- 1912: Sa majesté Grippemiche
- 1912: Le Fabricant d'automates (La Poupée tyrolienne)
- 1912: Un grand amour (Pianiste par amour)
- 1912: La Moche
- 1912: L'Heure du berger
- 1912: La Folle de Pen-March (La Folle de Penmarch)
- 1912: Les Enfants perdus dans la forêt
- 1912: La Dernière aventure du prince Curaçao
- 1912: Toto jaloux (Le Crime de Toto)
- 1912: Le Cœur des pauvres
- 1912: Le Chercheur de truffes
- 1912: L'Auberge du tohu-bohu
- 1912: La Vengeance de Licinius
- 1912: Pauvre père
- 1912: La Porteuse de pain
- 1912: La Petite fonctionnaire
- 1913: La Jeunesse de Rocambole (Rocambole)
- 1913: Les Pauvres de Paris
- 1913: Les Exploits de Rocambole (Le Nouveau Rocambole)
- 1913: Joséphine vendue par ses sœurs
- 1913: Jeanne la maudite
- 1913: L'Enfant de la folle
- 1913: Le Ruisseau
- 1913: Le Roman d'un jeune homme pauvre
- 1914: Rocambole et l'héritage du Marquis de Morfontaine
- 1914: Marie-Jeanne ou la femme du peuple
- 1914: La Douleur d'aimer
- 1915: La Guerre du feu
- 1916: Le Rêve d'Yvonne
- 1916: La Joueuse d'orgue
- 1916: Le Médecin des enfants
- 1916: Le Coffre-fort
- 1917: Le Geste
- 1917: Son fils
- 1917: Le Secret de la comtesse
- 1917: 48, avenue de l'Opéra
- 1917: La Comtesse de Somerive
- 1918: Les Grands
- 1918: André Cornélis
- 1919: L'Argent qui tue

== Filmography (as actor) ==
- 1920: L'Hirondelle et la Mésange
- 1939: La Fin du jour

== See also ==
- Louis Feuillade
