= A Romance in Flanders =

- Directed by: Maurice Elvey
- Written by: Harold Simpson
- Based on: Widow's Island by Mario Fort and Rolf E. Vanloo
- Produced by: Friedrich Deutschmeister
- Starring: Paul Cavanagh; Marcelle Chantal; Garry Marsh
- Cinematography: Sydney Blythe; William Luff
- Production company: Franco–London Films
- Distributed by: British Lion Films
- Release date: 17 August 1937
- Running time: 73 minutes
- Country: United Kingdom
- Language: English

A Romance in Flanders (also known as Lost on the Western Front and Widow's Island) is a 1937 British drama film directed by Maurice Elvey and starring Paul Cavanagh, Marcelle Chantal, Olga Lindo and Alastair Sim. It was written by Harold Simpson based on the novel Widow's Island by Mario Fort and Rolf E. Vanloo. It was made at the Riverside Studios in Hammersmith by the independent Franco-London Films.

A French film of the story, L'île des veuves (1937), was also produced, with Chantal appearing in both versions. Both films were produced by Friedrich Deutschmeister.

== Preservation status ==
The British Film Institute National Archive holds a collection of ephemera and stills but no film or video materials.

== Synopsis ==
During the First World War campaign in Flanders two British Expeditionary Force soldiers are both attracted to local women Yvonne. During a German attack on the Widow's Island salient, John Morley is left for dead by Rodd Berry who now has a free hand with Yvonne. Twenty years later Yvonne, married to Berry for two decades, encounters a tourist guide on the battlefield with an uncanny resemblance to Morley and possibly suffering from amnesia.

== Cast ==
- Paul Cavanagh as John Morley
- Marcelle Chantal as Yvonne Berry
- Garry Marsh as Rodd Berry
- Olga Lindo as Madame Vlandermaere
- Alastair Sim as Colonel Wexton
- Evelyn Roberts as Captain Stanford
- Kynaston Reeves as Major Burke
- Arthur Hambling as Colonel Kennedy
- C. Denier Warren as Bill Johnson
- Frank Atkinson as Joe Stuggins
- Bobbie Comber as chauffeur
- Andreas Malandrinos as Mayor
- Denise Sydney as Muriel
- Kathleen Weston as Bessie
- Muriel Pavlow

== Reception ==
Kine Weekly wrote: "The subject matter is inherently sombre, but the director, Maurice Elvey, has relieved the tension adequately by introducing friendly reunion celebrations and carefully planned thrills. In fact, it is the framing of the emotional theme, rather than the theme itselt that constitutes the major portion of the popular entertainment. The film is in spite of its orthodoxy, not at all bad theatre."

The Daily Film Renter wrote: "Paul Cavanagh gives a good performance as the war-racked guide, who cannot leave Flanders because of its associations with the woman he loves. Marcelle Chantal is emotionally sympathetic as the woman, while Garry Marsh gives a suitably bluff performance as her stolid husband. Production is patchy in spots, detail of wartime tank rescue being gripping in the extreme, but model shots of war-racked battle-front unconvincing."

Picturegoer wrote: "Theatrical but reasonably interesting triangle drama ... Paul Cavanagh is polished and sensitive as the guide and affords a strong contrast to the bluff portrayal of the sergeant-major, given by Garry Marsh. Marcelle Chantal is somewhat colourless as the woman in the case."

Halliwell's Film Guide describes it as "rose-coloured romantic hokum".
