= The Two Schemers =

1938 film

- Directed by: Jacques Houssin
- Written by: Pierre Maudru; Paul Schiller
- Produced by: Georges Milton; Louis Gondry
- Starring: Georges Milton; Jules Berry; Josseline Gaël
- Cinematography: Fred Langenfeld
- Music by: André Hornez; Casimir Oberfeld
- Production company: Les Productions Parisiennes
- Distributed by: Les Films Georges Muller
- Release date: 24 February 1938
- Running time: 92 minutes
- Country: France
- Language: French

The Two Schemers (French: Les deux combinards) is a 1938 French comedy film directed by Jacques Houssin and starring Georges Milton, Jules Berry and Josseline Gaël. The film's sets were designed by the art director Robert-Jules Garnier.

== Synopsis ==
A shady businessman hires another much poorer man to pretend to be him in order to fulfil his military service as a reservist. A series of misunderstandings eventually lead to the speculator losing all his money while the other becomes a millionaire.

== Cast ==
- Georges Milton as André Michaud
- Jules Berry as Jacques Barisart
- Josseline Gaël as Lucette
- Fernand Charpin as Le capitane Lambesc
- Louis Baron fils as Le président du tribunal
- Mady Berry as La marchande d'oeufs
- Jean Témerson as Ernest - le larbin
- Génia Vaury as Mme Barisart
- Paul Velsa as L'avocat
- Yolande Guibert as Mado
- Henri Marchand as Cormoz
- Pierre-Louis as Un soldat
- Titys as Le témoin
- Georges Bever
- Jean Brochard
- Hugues de Bagratide
- Irène Jeanning
- Rosita Montenegro
- Claude Roy
- Jean Tissier

== Bibliography ==
- Bessy, Maurice & Chirat, Raymond. Histoire du cinéma français: 1935-1939. Pygmalion, 1986.
- Crisp, Colin. Genre, Myth and Convention in the French Cinema, 1929-1939. Indiana University Press, 2002.
- Rège, Philippe. Encyclopedia of French Film Directors, Volume 1. Scarecrow Press, 2009.
