= Charles Rosher =

British-American cinematographer (1885–1974)

Charles Rosher A.S.C.
- Born: Charles Gladdish Rosher; 17 November 1885; London, England, UKGBI
- Died: 16 January 1974 (aged 88); British Hospital in Lisbon, Lisbon, Portugal
- Resting place: Estoril, Portugal
- Citizenship: American (from 1918)
- Occupation: Cinematographer
- Years active: 1912–1955
- Spouses: Lolita Rosher (m. 1913); Doris Rosher (m. 1925); Odette Duval (m. 1934); Doris Rosher
- Children: 2, including Joan Marsh
- Awards: Best Cinematography; 1928 Sunrise: A Song of Two Humans (co-winner Karl Struss); 1946 The Yearling

Charles Gladdish Rosher, A.S.C. (17 November 1885 – 15 January 1974) was a British-American cinematographer who worked from the early days of silent films through the 1950s.

He was Mary Pickford's favourite cinematographer and a personal friend, shooting all of the films in which she starred from 1918 to 1927, before they had a falling-out during production of Coquette (1929). He was the first cinematographer to receive an Academy Award, along with Karl Struss, for Sunrise: A Song of Two Humans (1927), and won again for The Yearling (1946), with Leonard Smith and Arthur Arling. He was also nominated four times.

== Biography ==
Rosher was born Charles Gladdish Rosher on 17 November 1885 in London. According to an interview of him in the documentary The Image Makers: The Adventures of America's Pioneer Cinematographers, he was originally unhappily studying naval architecture, but enrolled in London Polytechnic's school of photography, photography being a hobby of his. He eventually became an assistant to Richard Speaight, the official photographer of the British royal family.

After attending a conference in Rochester, New York in 1908, he decided to stay in the United States, as the pay was much better and he did not have to wear a morning coat. He became a newsreel cameraman. In 1910, he went to work for David Horsley in his production company in New Jersey. Because early film was largely restricted to using daylight, Horsley relocated his production company to Hollywood in 1911, taking Rosher with him, and opened the first movie studio there. This made Rosher the first full-time cameraman in Hollywood.

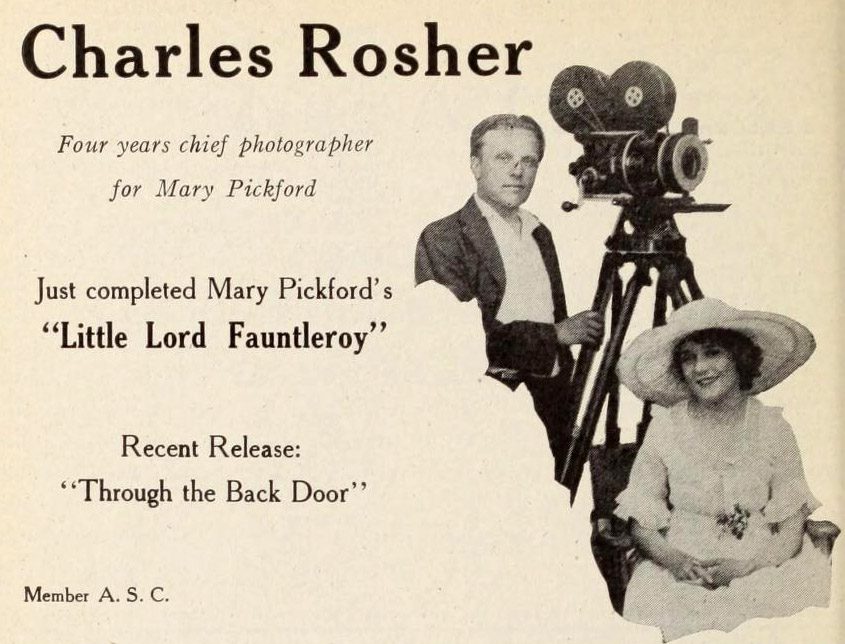
Rosher with Mary Pickford (1921)

In 1913, Rosher went to Mexico to shoot newsreel footage of Pancho Villa's rebellion. Rosher became a naturalised American citizen on 6 September 1918. In January 1919, he was one of the 15 founders of the American Society of Cinematographers and served as the group's first vice-president. In the 1920s, he was one of the more sought-after cinematographers in Hollywood, and was a personal favourite of stars such as Mary Pickford, working with her, first on A Little Princess (1917), then on all the films she acted in from How Could You, Jean? (1918) to My Best Girl (1927).

However, they had a falling out over the restrictions the sound department wanted to impose in shooting Coquette (1929), Pickford's first talking picture, and Karl Struss took over the cinematography. His work with Struss on F. W. Murnau's 1927 film Sunrise: A Song of Two Humans is viewed as a milestone in cinematography and won the pair the first Academy Award for cinematography in 1929. He shot five films for producer David O. Selznick, including Rockabye (1932), Our Betters (1933) and Little Lord Fauntleroy (1936).

Rosher worked at several studios, but spent the last 12 years of his career exclusively at Metro-Goldwyn-Mayer, shooting such films as Annie Get Your Gun, Show Boat, Kiss Me Kate, and The Yearling.

== Personal life ==
Rosher was married at least 4 times. On 14 February 1913, Rosher married Lolita Rosher (née Hayes) in El Paso with whom he had the actress Joan Marsh. Rosher later married the actress Doris Patricia Rosher (née Cubitt) on 6 January 1925, the same year he was rumoured to be the lover of the then 20 year old Anna May Wong. On 9 June 1934, Rosher married the actress Odette Duval (née Guazoni) with whom he had the cinematographer Charles Rosher Jr. (1935–2015). Rosher later remarried Doris and she is listed as his wife on his death report.

On 16 January 1974, Rosher died in Lisbon, Portugal at the British Hospital in Lisbon aged 88. Rosher was buried in Estoril.

== Awards and nominations ==
| Award | Year | Category | Nominated work | Result | Notes | Ref(s) |
|---|---|---|---|---|---|---|
| Academy Awards | 1929 | Best Cinematography | Sunrise: A Song of Two Humans | Won | With Karl Struss | |
| Academy Awards | 1935 | Best Cinematography | The Affairs of Cellini | Nominated | | |
| Academy Awards | 1945 | Best Cinematography | Kismet | Nominated | | |
| Academy Awards | 1947 | Best Cinematography | The Yearling | Won | With Leonard Smith and Arthur E. Arling | |
| Academy Awards | 1951 | Best Cinematography | Annie Get Your Gun | Nominated | | |
| Academy Awards | 1952 | Best Cinematography | Show Boat | Nominated | | |
| George Eastman Award | 1955 | | | Won | | |
| George Eastman Award | 1957 | | | Won | | |

In addition, Rosher received Photoplay magazine's Gold Medal, and the only fellowship awarded by the Society of Motion Picture Engineers.

== Filmography ==
* indicates a Pickford film.

| Year | Title | Notes | Ref(s) |
|---|---|---|---|
| 1912 | The Indian Raiders | Short | |
| 1912 | Early Days in the West | Short | |
| 1912 | Life of Villa | Documentary | |
| 1913 | With Pancho Villa in Mexico | | |
| 1914 | The Next in Command | | |
| 1914 | The Oath of a Viking | Short | |
| 1914 | The Mystery of the Poison Pool | | |
| 1914 | Santo Icario | | |
| 1915 | The Smuggler's Lass | Short | |
| 1915 | The Mad Maid of the Forest | Short | |
| 1915 | Gene of the Northland | Short | |
| 1915 | The Voice in the Fog | | |
| 1915 | Blackbirds | Credited as Charles G. Rosher | |
| 1916 | The Sowers | | |
| 1916 | The Clown | | |
| 1916 | Common Ground | | |
| 1916 | Anton the Terrible | | |
| 1916 | The Heir to the Hoorah | | |
| 1916 | The Plow Girl | | |
| 1917 | On Record | | |
| 1917 | A Mormon Maid | | |
| 1917 | The Primrose Ring | | |
| 1917 | At First Sight | | |
| 1917 | Hashimura Togo | | |
| 1917 | A Little Princess* | With Walter Stradling | |
| 1917 | The Secret Game | | |
| 1918 | The Widow's Might | | |
| 1918 | One More American | | |
| 1918 | The Honor of His House | | |
| 1918 | The White Man's Law | | |
| 1918 | How Could You, Jean?* | | |
| 1918 | Johanna Enlists* | | |
| 1918 | Too Many Millions | | |
| | The Dub | | |
| | Captain Kidd, Jr.* | | |
| | Daddy-Long-Legs* | | |
| | The Hoodlum* | | |
| | Heart o' the Hills* | | |
| 1920 | Pollyanna* | | |
| 1920 | Suds* | With L. William O'Connell | |
| 1920 | The White Circle (1920) | With Alfred Ortlieb | |
| 1920 | Dinty (1920) | With David Kesson and Foster Leonard | |
| 1921 | The Love Light* | | |
| 1921 | Through the Back Door* | | |
| 1921 | Little Lord Fauntleroy* | | |
| 1922 | Smilin' Through | With J. Roy Hunt | |
| 1922 | Tess of the Storm Country* | | |
| 1923 | Sant'Ilario | | |
| 1923 | Rosita* | | |
| 1923 | Tiger Rose | | |
| 1924 | Dorothy Vernon of Haddon Hall* | | |
| 1924 | Three Women | With Charles Van Enger | |
| 1925 | Little Annie Rooney* | With Hal Mohr | |
| 1926 | Sparrows* | With Hal Mohr | |
| 1927 | Sunrise: A Song of Two Humans | | |
| 1927 | My Best Girl* | | |
| 1928 | Tempest | | |
| 1928 | Coquette* | Uncredited | |
| 1929 | Eternal Love (1929) | With Oliver T. Marsh | |
| 1929 | The Vagabond Queen | | |
| 1929 | Atlantik | | |
| 1929 | Atlantic | | |
| 1930 | The Road Is Fine | | |
| 1930 | Knowing Men | | |
| 1930 | Two Worlds | | |
| 1930 | Zwei Welten | With Mutz Greenbaum | |
| 1930 | The Price of Things | | |
| 1930 | Atlantis | | |
| 1930 | War Nurse | | |
| 1930 | Paid | | |
| 1930 | Les deux mondes | | |
| 1931 | Dance, Fools, Dance | | |
| 1931 | Laughing Sinners | | |
| 1931 | This Modern Age | | |
| 1931 | Silence | | |
| 1931 | The Beloved Bachelor | | |
| 1931 | Husband's Holiday | | |
| 1932 | What Price Hollywood? | | |
| 1932 | Two Against the World | | |
| 1932 | Flaming Gold | | |
| 1932 | Rockabye | | |
| 1933 | The Past of Mary Holmes | | |
| 1933 | Our Betters | | |
| 1933 | The Silver Cord | | |
| 1933 | Bed of Roses | | |
| 1933 | After Tonight | | |
| 1934 | Moulin Rouge | | |
| 1934 | The Affairs of Cellini | | |
| 1934 | Outcast Lady | | |
| 1934 | What Every Woman Knows | | |
| 1935 | After Office Hours (1935) | | |
| 1935 | Call of the Wild | | |
| 1935 | Broadway Melody of 1936 | | |
| 1936 | Little Lord Fauntleroy | | |
| 1936 | Small Town Girl | With Oliver T. Marsh | |
| 1936 | Men Are Not Gods | | |
| 1937 | The Woman I Love | | |
| 1937 | The Perfect Specimen | | |
| 1937 | Hollywood Hotel | With George Barnes | |
| 1938 | White Banners | | |
| 1938 | Hard to Get | | |
| 1939 | Off the Record | | |
| 1939 | Yes, My Darling Daughter | | |
| 1939 | Hell's Kitchen | | |
| 1939 | Espionage Agent | | |
| 1939 | A Child Is Born | | |
| 1940 | Brother Rat and a Baby | | |
| 1940 | Three Cheers for the Irish | | |
| 1940 | My Love Came Back | | |
| 1941 | Four Mothers | | |
| 1941 | Million Dollar Baby | | |
| 1941 | One Foot in Heaven | | |
| 1942 | Mokey | | |
| 1942 | Pierre of the Plains | | |
| 1942 | Stand By for Action | | |
| 1943 | Assignment in Brittany | | |
| 1943 | I Dood It (1943) | Uncredited | |
| 1943 | Swing Fever | | |
| 1944 | Kismet | | |
| 1945 | Ziegfeld Follies | Uncredited; with George Folsey and Ray June | |
| 1945 | Yolanda and the Thief | | |
| 1946 | The Yearling | With Arthur Arling and Leonard Smith | |
| 1947 | Fiesta | With Wilfrid M. Cline and Sidney Wagner | |
| 1947 | Dark Delusion | | |
| 1947 | Song of the Thin Man | | |
| 1948 | On an Island with You | | |
| 1948 | Words and Music | With Harry Stradling | |
| 1949 | Neptune's Daughter | | |
| 1949 | The Red Danube | | |
| 1949 | East Side, West Side | | |
| 1950 | Annie Get Your Gun | | |
| 1950 | Pagan Love Song | | |
| 1951 | Show Boat | | |
| 1952 | Scaramouche | | |
| 1953 | The Story of Three Loves | | |
| 1953 | Young Bess | With Harold Rosson | |
| 1953 | Kiss Me Kate | | |
| 1955 | Jupiter's Darling | With Paul C. Vogel | |
