= Juan José (play) =

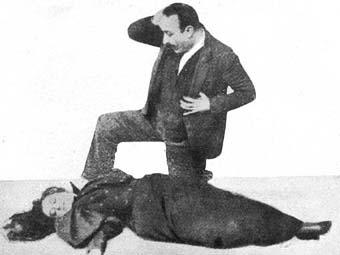
An 1895 performance of the play

Juan José is an 1895 melodramatic play by the Spanish writer Joaquín Dicenta. It was first staged at the Teatro de la Comedia in Madrid on 25 October 1895. The film adaptation became noted for its subversive social criticism and was often banned. A tradition developed of staging the play on May Day. Between 1895 and 1939 it was estimated to be the second most performed play in Spain.

== Synopsis ==
A labourer violently quarrels with his employer over a woman.

== Film adaptation ==
In 1928 the play was adapted into a film Life directed by Adelqui Migliar for the British company Whitehall Films. It featured a mixed cast of Spanish and British actors, and was shot on location in Spain.

== Bibliography ==
- Low, Rachel. The History of British Film: Volume IV, 1918–1929. Routledge, 1997.
- Thatcher Gies, David. The Theatre in Nineteenth-Century Spain. Cambridge University Press, 2005.
