= In the Name of the Law (1932 film) =

1932 film directed by Maurice Tourneur

- Directed by: Maurice Tourneur
- Written by: Paul Bringuier (novel); Maurice Tourneur
- Starring: Marcelle Chantal; Régine Dancourt; Gabriel Gabrio; Jean Marchat
- Cinematography: Georges Benoît; Marc Bujard
- Edited by: Jacques Tourneur
- Production company: Pathé-Natan
- Distributed by: Pathé-Natan
- Release date: 19 April 1932
- Running time: 85 minutes
- Country: France
- Language: French

In the Name of the Law (French: Au nom de la loi) is a 1932 French crime film directed by Maurice Tourneur and starring Marcelle Chantal, Régine Dancourt and Gabriel Gabrio. It was based on a novel by Paul Bringuier. The film was well received by critics. Variety considered Marcelle Chantal's performance "her best so far in talkers".

== Synopsis ==
After the discovery of a murdered police inspector's body in the River Seine, two of his colleagues pursue a beautiful lady, involved with a drug smuggling ring based in the South of France, who they believe responsible for the killing.

== Cast ==
- Marcelle Chantal as Sandra
- Régine Dancourt as Mireille
- Gabriel Gabrio as Amédée
- Jean Marchat as Marcel
- Jean Dax as Chevalier
- José Noguéro as Gonzalès
- Harry Nestor as Comte de Bullack
- Pierre Labry as Ludovic
- Geo Laby as Clamart
- Charles Vanel as Lancelot

== Bibliography ==
- Waldman, Harry. Maurice Tourneur: The Life and Films. McFarland, 2008.
