= L'Hirondelle et la Mésange =

1920 film by André Antoine

- Directed by: André Antoine
- Written by: Gustave Grillet
- Produced by: S.C.A.G.L. (Société Cinématographique des Auteurs et Gens de Lettres)
- Starring: Louis Ravet; Jane Mayliances; Pierre Alcover
- Cinematography: René Guychard; Léonce-Henri Burel
- Distributed by: Pathé
- Release date: 12 March 1984 (France)
- Running time: 79 minutes [1984 reconstruction]
- Country: France
- Language: Silent (French intertitles)

L'Hirondelle et la Mésange ("the swallow and the titmouse") is a French drama film directed by André Antoine, filmed in 1920 but not released. A reconstruction was made and screened in 1984.

== Plot ==
Pierre van Groot is skipper of two barges, L'Hirondelle and La Mésange, on which he transports building materials along the waterways of Belgium and northern France for areas devastated by the First World War. He is accompanied by his wife Griet and her younger sister Marthe, and they supplement their income with some private smuggling across the French border. In Antwerp Pierre hires a capable new mate, Michel. During their voyage, Michel ingratiates himself with the family and courts Marthe, while masking his plan to discover the hiding-place of some contraband diamonds. When Pierre catches Michel in the act of stealing the diamonds, he exacts a ruthless punishment that will protect the family secret.

== Cast ==
- Louis Ravet as Pierre van Groot
- Jane Maylianes as Griet, his wife
- Pierre Alcover as Michel, the mate
- Maguy Deliac as Marthe, the younger sister of Griet
- Georges Denola as the diamond merchant

== Production ==
André Antoine, best known for his innovative theatre productions to which he brought new standards of realism, turned to the cinema in 1915 and he applied to his films his preference for naturalism in both settings and acting styles. For L'Hirondelle et la Mésange in 1920 he took his crew and actors to Belgium to film on a barge as they sailed it along the river Scheldt and the canals of Flanders. He filmed the lives of the boatmen, their procedures as they navigated under bridges and through locks, and the landscapes through which they passed. Filming also took place in Antwerp (including its Ommeganck festival), Bruges, Ghent and Temse in Belgium, and Mortagne-du Nord in northern France.

When the 'rushes' were shown to the distributor, Charles Pathé, he rejected the film, saying that it was more of a documentary than a film. The material was then shelved without being released. In 1924 some material was edited and given a single corporate screening, but the film then disappeared for many decades. In 1982 the unedited negative (of about six hours duration) was rediscovered at the Cinémathèque française, and Henri Colpi was asked to edit a new version, using the original screenplay of Gustave Grillet and the working notes of Antoine. The resulting film, running for about 79 minutes, was premiered at the Cinémathèque française in March 1984, with a score commissioned from Raymond Alessandrini which incorporated three themes by Maurice Jaubert.

== Reception ==
The film was subsequently shown at many film festivals and film societies, including the 2005 Giornate del Cinema Muto whose catalogue contained the following remarks:

... Antoine mixed professionals with actors taken from life, authentic people of the river, recruited together with their barge. Under his direction all act with discretion and simplicity. He sees the action from varied viewpoints of their life, using different cameras. Much material is shot in the environment encountered in the course of the journey of this 'river movie'. Often Antoine diverts his view from the people to regard the river, its banks, the landscape which passes in lateral tracking shots until it becomes itself a character, a silent witness to the drama: a diversion of the attention which serves to extinguish the incandescent dramatic matter. ... In September 1934, discussing L’Atalante in his role as a cinema critic, Antoine also referred to his own uncompleted film, which in some respects anticipated that of Jean Vigo. Modestly, without mentioning his own role, he wrote simply: "In this genre I recall only Marcel Achard’s La Belle Marinière, and another story, from many years ago, Gustave Grillet’s L’Hirondelle et la Mésange, which was also set on a barge, on the journey to L’Escaut, between Antwerp and Bruges. At the time the work was judged too new, and consequently not commercial".

The notes also quoted the judgment of the film director Bertrand Tavernier: “There are few films which espouse to the limit the sentiments of their characters, without concessions either to them or to the spectator. L’Hirondelle et la Mésange, which rejects theatrical effects, facile dramatization, everything that might spoil, in an arbitrary way, the telling of the story, seems to be born (or reborn) in each shot of the interior movement of the characters.”
