= Moulin Rouge (1928 film) =

1928 film directed by Ewald André Dupont

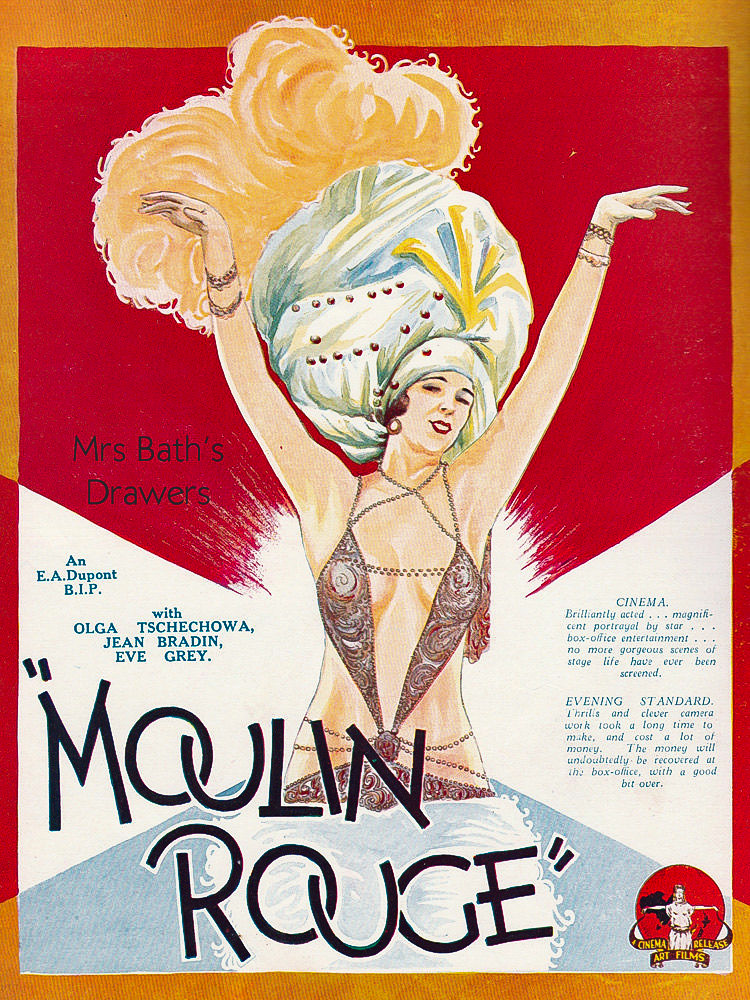
- Directed by: Ewald André Dupont
- Written by: Ewald André Dupont
- Produced by: Ewald André Dupont
- Starring: Olga Chekhova; Eve Gray; Jean Bradin; Marcel Vibert
- Cinematography: Werner Brandes
- Edited by: Harry Chandlee
- Production companies: British International Pictures; Sono Art-World Wide Pictures
- Distributed by: Wardour Films; Sono Art-World Wide Pictures
- Release date: May 1928
- Running time: 130 minutes
- Country: United Kingdom
- Languages: Sound (synchronized); English intertitles

Moulin Rouge is a 1928 British synchronized sound drama film directed by Ewald André Dupont and starring Olga Chekhova, Eve Gray and Jean Bradin. Due to the popularity of sound films, the American film company Sono Art-World Wide Pictures collaborated with B.I.P. to produce a sound version of the film for cinemas wired for sound. They recorded the soundtrack using the RCA Photophone sound system. While the film has no audible dialog, it was released with a synchronized musical score with sound effects using both the sound-on-disc and sound-on-film process. The film is set in and around the Moulin Rouge cabaret in Paris.

== Plot ==
The silent (left) and sound (right) versions of Moulin Rouge

Andre and his fiancé Margaret go to the Moulin Rouge nightclub where they see the performance of the star performer Parysia. Margaret reveals to Andre that Parysia is her mother. After the show, they go backstage to meet Parysia. While eating dinner, they discuss Andre and Margaret's relationship. Although they want to be married, Andre's father has forbidden it.

Parysia goes to Andre's father and convinces him to give his blessing. In the meantime, Andre has realized that he has fallen in love with Parysia. While Margaret and her mother start planning the wedding and getting Margaret her wedding dress, Andre is agonizing over a letter to his father to thank him. Andre becomes more depressed when he writes sentences mentioning Parysia in the letter.

Andre meets Margaret and they go out to dinner. Margaret gets tipsy and asks Andre to kiss her. Andre kisses her passionately while thinking he is actually kissing Parysia. After taking Margaret home, Andre plans his suicide. As he promised he would drive to his father's in the country and ask him to the wedding, he sabotages the brakes on the car. The next morning, he goes to pick up Margaret. He attempts to convince her not to go with him but he is overwrought and passes out. Margret leaves in the car while Andre sleeps. After Andre wakes up, he tells Parysia of what he has done, saying he could not enter into a marriage that is a lie; he loves Parysia. Parysia convinces Andre to take her car and save Margaret.

Margaret arrives at the father's house to find he will be away for two weeks. Although concerned about the car's brakes, she starts driving back to Paris while Andre races from Paris to meet her. They narrowly avoid a head-on collision and Andre turns around and pulls up beside Margaret, who can't stop her car. Margaret jumps to Andre in the other car, causing both cars to crash and both Andre and Margaret are badly injured.

Parysia receives a phone call from the hospital informing her that her daughter is critically injured. At the same time, she has to go to the club to perform. While Parysia performs, the doctors at the hospital are operating on Margaret. Finally, Parysia can't take the stress and passes out. At the hospital, Margaret briefly appears to die but is revived. The three are reunited at the hospital where Margaret is recovering. After they recover, Andre and Margaret take a train to the south of France to begin their honeymoon.

== Cast ==
- Olga Chekhova as Parysia
- Eve Gray as Margaret
- Jean Bradin as Andre
- Georges Tréville as father
- Marcel Vibert as Marquis
- Ellen Pollock as Girt
- Andrews Engelmann as chauffeur
- Forrester Harvey as tourist

== Music ==
The film featured a theme song entitled "My Wonderful Love" which was written by William Stone (composer) and Charles Wynn (lyricist).

== Production ==
The film was made at Elstree Studios by British International Pictures. It was Dupont's last film without recorded dialogue, although several of his later sound films were released with silent versions. Dupont was one of a number of leading Continental technicians and actors hired by BIP in the late 1920s to try and establish the company as a leading international producer. Alfred Junge worked as Art Director.

== Restoration and home media ==
Moulin Rouge was originally released in 1928 as a silent film, running approximately 130 minutes. The following year, it was edited and re-released with a Synchronized score composed by John Reynders, which included various sound effects. This version ran for 86 minutes and is available from several budget DVD labels.

In 2017, the film was restored in HD to close to its original running time, at 127 minutes. Reynder's 1929 score was repurposed for this version, but as it was considerably shorter, over 120 music edits were made in order for it to fit. The restored version has been released in the UK on Blu-ray and DVD by Network.

== See also ==
- Moulin Rouge, 1952 film
- Moulin Rouge!, 2001 film
- List of early sound feature films (1926–1929)

== Bibliography ==
- St. Pierre, Paul Matthew. E.A. Dupont and his Contribution to British Film: Varieté, Moulin Rouge, Piccadilly, Atlantic, Two Worlds, Cape Forlorn. Fairleigh Dickinson University Press, 2010. ISBN 1611474337.
