= The Three Masks (1929 film) =

1929 film

- Directed by: André Hugon
- Based on: The Three Masks by Charles Méré
- Produced by: André Hugon
- Starring: Renée Héribel; Jean Toulout; François Rozet
- Cinematography: Raymond Agnel
- Music by: Isidore de Lara
- Production company: Pathé-Natan
- Distributed by: Pathé-Natan
- Release date: 1 November 1929
- Running time: 70 minutes
- Country: France
- Language: French

The Three Masks (French: Les trois masques) is a 1929 French film directed by André Hugon and starring Renée Héribel, Jean Toulout and François Rozet. Produced by Pathé the film is considered to be a candidate for France's first talking picture, but was made in Britain. As no French studio had yet been converted for sound, it was shot at Twickenham Studios in London. The first talking picture produced in France is probably Pierre Colombier's Chiqué, although The Queen's Necklace produced by Pathe's rival Gaumont is also considered a contender.

The first American sound films had premiered in Europe, followed by Alfred Hitchcock's Blackmail in 1929. Producer Julius Hagen was quick in overhauling the studios at Twickenham for sound and providing sound stages for rent to both British and Continental producers. The film's sets were designed by the art director Christian-Jaque. The film is based on the 1908 play of the same title by Charles Méré, which had previously been made into a 1921 silent The Three Masks by Henry Krauss.

== Synopsis ==
In Corsica two brothers decide to take revenge against the young man who has got their sister pregnant, unaware that he is trying to marry her in the face of his father's opposition. They stab him while all three are wearing masks for a carnival.

== Cast ==
- Renée Héribel as Viola Vescotelli
- Jean Toulout as Pratti Della Corba
- François Rozet as Paolo
- Marcel Vibert as Vescotelli
- Paul Azaïs as Le fils Vescotelli
- Henri Bargin
- Rachel Boyer
- Pierre Geay
- Michel Kovachevitch
- Clotilde Person as La tante Della Corba
- Louis Rouyer as Un masque

== See also ==
- List of early sound feature films (1926–1929)

== Bibliography ==
- Crisp, C.G. The Classic French Cinema, 1930-1960. Indiana University Press, 1993
- Lanzoni, Rémi Fournier . French Cinema: From Its Beginnings to the Present. A&C Black, 2004.
- Rège, Philippe. Encyclopedia of French Film Directors, Volume 1. Scarecrow Press, 2009.
- Williams, Alan Larson. Republic of Images: A History of French Filmmaking. Harvard University Press, 1992.
