= Pierre Maudru =

French screenwriter

- Born: 24 April 1892; Asnières-sur-Seine, Hauts-de-Seine, France
- Died: 1 March 1992 (aged 99); Paris, France
- Occupations: Screenwriter, Director
- Years active: 1921-1965 (film)

Pierre Maudru (1892–1992) was a French screenwriter. He also directed three films. He was the son of the silent era director Charles Maudru.

== Selected filmography ==
- André Cornélis (1927)
- La Maison de la Fléche (1930)
- Hai-Tang (1930)
- Atlantis (1930)
- The Mystery of the Villa Rose (1930)
- The Sweetness of Loving (1930)
- Azaïs (1931)
- The Polish Jew (1931)
- Make a Living (1931)
- Our Lord's Vineyard (1932)
- Love and Luck (1932)
- Night Shift (1932)
- The Lacquered Box (1932)
- Miss Helyett (1933)
- The Barber of Seville (1933)
- A Train in the Night (1934)
- The Flame (1936)
- Grey's Thirteenth Investigation (1937)
- The Two Schemers (1938)
- Prince Bouboule (1939)
- The Porter from Maxim's (1939)
- Monsieur Hector (1940)
- Tourments (1954)
- The Contessa's Secret (1954)
- Marie of the Isles (1959)
- Hot Frustrations (1965)

== Bibliography ==
- Goble, Alan. The Complete Index to Literary Sources in Film. Walter de Gruyter, 1999.
