= The Berg (play) =

1929 play

- Original language: English
- Written by: Ernest Raymond
- Genre: Drama
- Setting: Cruise liner, Atlantic Ocean

Premiere
- Date: 4 March 1929
- Place: Q Theatre, London

The Berg is a 1929 play by the British writer Ernest Raymond. It is based on the sinking of the RMS Titanic in 1912.

It premiered at the Q Theatre in Kew Bridge before transferring to His Majesty's Theatre in the West End where it ran for 29 performances between 12 March and 6 April 1929. The original West End cast included Godfrey Tearle, George Relph, Ian Fleming, Edgar Norfolk, Robert Mawdesley, Wallace Geoffrey, Marion Fawcett and Beatrix Thomson.

== Film adaptation ==
It was adapted into a film the same year, Atlantic, directed by Ewald André Dupont and starring Franklin Dyall, Madeleine Carroll and John Stuart. It was released in four versions, with English-language silent and sound versions as well as French and German-language productions.

== Bibliography ==
- Goble, Alan. The Complete Index to Literary Sources in Film. Walter de Gruyter, 1999.
- Wearing, J.P. The London Stage 1920-1929: A Calendar of Productions, Performers, and Personnel. Rowman & Littlefield, 2014.
