= Girls in Distress =

1939 film

- Film poster
- Directed by: G. W. Pabst
- Written by: Albrecht Joseph; Peter Quinn; Christa Winsloe
- Starring: Marcelle Chantal; Micheline Presle; André Luguet
- Cinematography: Michel Kelber
- Edited by: Louisette Hautecoeur
- Music by: Ralph Erwin
- Production company: Globe-Films
- Distributed by: Lux Compagnie Cinématographique de France
- Release date: 25 August 1939
- Running time: 90 minutes
- Country: France
- Language: French

Girls in Distress (French: Jeunes filles en détresse) is a 1939 French drama film directed by G. W. Pabst and starring Marcelle Chantal, Micheline Presle and André Lugue.

The film's sets were designed by the art director Andrej Andrejew. It was shot at the Joinville Studios in Paris.

== Cast ==
- Marcelle Chantal as Marthe Presle
- Micheline Presle as Jacqueline Presle
- André Luguet as Maître Jacques Presle
- Jean Aquistapace as Ternier, le ministre de la justice (as Aquistapace)
- Pierre Bertin as Legris, le secrétaire de Me Presle
- Louise Carletti as Marguerite 'Margot' Montbleu
- Jacqueline Delubac as Mme Montbleu, nom de scène: Pola D'Ivry
- Arthur Devère as Le père d'Alice
- Genevieve Dorlane as Mme Tarrand
- Paulette Élambert as Denise Tarrand
- Michel François as Michel Mortier
- René Génin as Le concierge du ministère
- Gaston Jacquet as Le père d'Amélie
- Georges Jamin as Le beauaspère d'Amélie
- Margo Lion as La mère de Thérèse
- Marcel Lupovici as Morel
- Mlle Malakowsky as Amélie
- Robert Manuel as Robert
- Milly Mathis as La mère d'Alice
- Marthe Mellot as Mademoiselle Jeanne
- Marguerite Moreno as Madame Vuilliard
- Robert Pizani as Monsieur Tarrand
- Christiane Ribes as La mère d'Amélie
- Gabrielle Robinne as Le mère d'Yvette
- Barbara Shaw as La belleasmère d'Amélie
- Sinoël as Le concierge du théâtre
- Yvonne Yma as L'habilleuse de Pola

Notable uncredited cast are:

- Madeleine Lebeau as a Student

== Bibliography ==
- Rentschler, Eric. The Films of G.W. Pabst: An Extraterritorial Cinema. Rutgers University Press, 1990.
