= Life of Villa =

- Directed by: Christy Cabanne
- Produced by: D.W. Griffith, Pancho Villa
- Starring: Pancho Villa, Don Luis Terrazas
- Cinematography: Charles Rosher
- Release date: 1912 (U.S.)
- Language: Silent

Life of Villa is a 1912 silent war documentary set during the Mexican Revolution. Though some scenes are re-enacted after it happened, the movie is a real documentary on the struggle of Mexican revolutionary Pancho Villa to overthrow dictator Porfirio Díaz.

== Cast ==
- Pancho Villa as himself
- Luis Terrazas as himself
