= Hélène Darly =

French actress (1900–1994)

- Born: Éliane Émilienne Pauline Pilate; 4 May 1900; Paris, France
- Died: 17 May 1994 (aged 94); Conches-sur-Gondoire, France
- Occupation: Actress
- Years active: 1920–1933
- Spouse: Marcel Vibert

Hélène Darly (born Éliane Émilienne Pauline Pilate; 4 May 1900 – 17 May 1994) was a French film actress whose career was most prominent in the silent film era.

== Biography ==
Hélène Darly was born Éliane Émilienne Pauline Pilate in the 11th arrondissement of Paris and began her film career in the early 1920s. She soon became known for her roles as Berthe Janin in Camille de Morlhon's Daughter of the People (1920), as Régine de Bettigny in Alexandre Volkoff's The House of Mystery (1923), and Marie Didier in Serge Nadejdine's Le chiffonnier de Paris (1924). She made several appearances after the transition to sound film, then later retired from the industry. On 14 October 1930, Darly married actor Marcel Vibert. She died in Conches-sur-Gondoire, Seine-et-Marne, in 1994 at age 94.

== Selected filmography ==
- Face à l'Océan (1920)
- Little Jacques (1923)
- The House of Mystery (1923)
- 600,000 Francs a Month (1926)
- Hai-Tang (1930)
- Atlantis (1930)
