= The Spinning Ball =

The Spinning Ball may refer to:

- The Spinning Ball (1927 film), a German silent film
- The Spinning Ball (1919 film), a German silent drama film
