= Widow's Island =

1937 film

- Belgian poster
- Directed by: Claude Heymann
- Written by: Mario Fort (novel); Rolf E. Vanloo (novel); André-Paul Antoine; Harold Simpson
- Produced by: Henry Deutschmeister
- Starring: Pierre Renoir; Marcelle Chantal; Aimé Clariond
- Cinematography: Jean-Paul Goreaud
- Music by: Ralph Erwin
- Production companies: Franco London Films; Haussmann Films
- Distributed by: Generalcine (Italy)
- Release date: 30 April 1937
- Running time: 90 minutes
- Country: France
- Language: French

Widow's Island (French: L'île des veuves) is a 1937 French war drama film directed by Claude Heymann and starring Pierre Renoir, Marcelle Chantal and Aimé Clariond. A separate British version of the story A Romance in Flanders was also produced, with Chantal appearing in both versions. Both films were produced by Friedrich Deutschmeister.

== Synopsis ==
In the First World War during the Battle of Widow's Island on the Western Front, a soldier of the British Army Richard Trent is left wounded by his comrade Ralph Berry and is presumed dead. The two men had been competing for the love of Yvonne, who marries Berry. Many years later the couple return for a commemoration of the battle and Yvonne encounters a battlefield tour guide who strongly resembles her former fiancée Trent.

== Cast ==
- Pierre Renoir as Ralph Berry
- Marcelle Chantal as Yvonne Berry
- Aimé Clariond as Richard Trent
- Georges Prieur as Sanders
- Line Noro as Madame Vandemaere
- Raymond Cordy as Le chauffeur
- Gabriel Farguette as La petite Muriel
- Georges Prieur as Sanders
- Paul Velsa
- Arthur Devère
- Jean Dunot
- Pierre Finaly
- Liliane Lesaffre

== Bibliography ==
- Bessy, Maurice & Chirat, Raymond. Histoire du cinéma français: 1935-1939. Pygmalion, 1986.
- Crisp, Colin. Genre, Myth and Convention in the French Cinema, 1929-1939. Indiana University Press, 2002.
- Rège, Philippe. Encyclopedia of French Film Directors, Volume 1. Scarecrow Press, 2009.
