= Le Bossu (1925 film) =

1925 film

- Directed by: Jean Kemm
- Written by: Jean Kemm
- Based on: Le Bossu by Paul Féval
- Produced by: Jacques Haïk
- Starring: Gaston Jacquet; Claude France; Maxime Desjardins; Marcel Vibert
- Cinematography: Willy Faktorovitch; Jean Jouannetaud
- Production company: Les Établissements Jacques Haïk
- Distributed by: Les Grands Spectacles Cinématographiques
- Release date: 2 October 1925
- Country: France
- Languages: Silent; French intertitles

Le Bosssu is a 1925 French silent historical adventure film directed by Jean Kemm and starring Gaston Jacquet, Claude France, Maxime Desjardins and Marcel Vibert. It is based on the 1858 novel Le Bossu by Paul Féval. It was shot at the Epinay Studios in Paris and on location around Dordogne and Tarascon. It is also known by the alternative title The Duke's Motto under which it was released in Britain by Gaumont British Distributors in 1926.

== Cast ==
- Gaston Jacquet as Henri de Lagardère
- Claude France as Aurore de Caylus
- Maxime Desjardins as Le Régent
- Marcel Vibert as Philippe de Gonzague
- Louis Pré Fils as Passepoil
- Jacques Arnna as Cocardasse
- Jacques Christiany as Chaverny
- Clairette de Savoye as Faenza
- Guy Demercay as Irène de Nevers enfant
- Jean Demerçay as Taranne
- Christiane Dorivy as Flore
- Nilda Duplessy as Irène de Nevers
- Jean Lorette as Duc de Nevers
- Hypolyte Paulet as Monsieur de Peyrolles

== Bibliography ==
- Goble, Alan. The Complete Index to Literary Sources in Film. Walter de Gruyter, 1999.
- Rège, Philippe. Encyclopedia of French Film Directors, Volume 1. Scarecrow Press, 2009.
