= Marcel Vibert =

French actor (1883–1959)

- Born: Marcel Étienne Vibert; 2 November 1883; Paris, France
- Died: 11 June 1959 (aged 75); Paris, France
- Other name: Marcel Étienne Vibert
- Occupations: Film actor, Stage actor
- Spouse: Hélène Darly

Marcel Vibert (2 November 1883 – 11 June 1959) was a French film actor. Vibert worked primarily in the French film industry, but in the late 1920s he also appeared in several British silent films including Moulin Rouge and Champagne.

On 14 October 1930, Vibert married actress Hélène Darly.

== Selected filmography ==
- Flanders under Philip II (1923)
- Little Jacques (1923)
- Terror (1924)
- Le Bossu (1925)
- Nitchevo (1926)
- The Garden of Allah (1927)
- Moulin Rouge (1928)
- Champagne (1928)
- Life (1928)
- Paris-New York-Paris (1928)
- Bright Eyes (1929)
- The Three Masks (1929)
- The Merry Widower (1929)
- The Hero of Every Girl's Dream (1929)
- Hai-Tang (1930)
- Atlantis (1930)
- The Mystery of the Yellow Room (1930)
- Princess, At Your Orders! (1931)
- The Perfume of the Lady in Black (1931)
- The Lacquered Box (1932)
- The Crime of Bouif (1933)
- Princesse Czardas (1934)
- The Darling of His Concierge (1934)
- Miss Bonaparte (1942)
- Shot in the Night (1943)
- Forces occultes (1943)
- The Queen's Necklace (1946)
- Coincidences (1947)

== Bibliography ==
- St. Pierre, Paul Matthew. E.A. Dupont and his Contribution to British Film: Varieté, Moulin Rouge, Piccadilly, Atlantic, Two Worlds, Cape Forlorn. Fairleigh Dickinson University Press, 2010
