= Hai-Tang =

1930 French-language film

- Le Chemin du déshonneur
- Directed by: Richard Eichberg; Jean Kemm
- Written by: Monckton Hoffe; Pierre Maudru; Ludwig Wolff
- Produced by: Richard Eichberg
- Starring: Anna May Wong; Marcel Vibert; Robert Ancelin
- Cinematography: Heinrich Gärtner; Bruno Mondi
- Music by: Hans May
- Production companies: Richard Eichberg-Film; British International Pictures; Les Établissements Jacques Haïk
- Release date: September 1930
- Running time: 80 minutes
- Countries: Germany; United Kingdom
- Language: French

Hai-Tang, also known as Le Chemin du déshonneur (The Road to Dishonour), is a 1930 British-German drama film directed by Richard Eichberg and Jean Kemm, starring Anna May Wong, Marcel Vibert and Robert Ancelin. It was shot at Elstree Studios.

== Multiple-language versions ==
Like many other films of the early talkie era before dubbing became more widespread, the film was shot in multiple-language versions, each with a different cast. Three versions of the film were made so they could be screened throughout Europe and the colonial world, such as in Mozambique, Australia and South Africa. This was Wong's first sound film billed as the star, (Note: Wong acted in one of several vignettes in the earlier 1930 musical film review Elstree Calling.) and in all three versions she appeared as the female lead.

An English-language version (The Flame of Love/The Road to Dishonour) and a German-language version (Hai-Tang: Der Weg zur Schande) of the film were made with different casts (Note: Ley On played Hai-Tang's brother Wang-Hu in all three versions. Mona Goya played the role of Yvette in the French and English-language versions.) except for Wong, who spoke her part in three different languages. The French-language version was sometimes referred to as L’Amour, maître des choses in French film magazines). Confusingly, all three versions are often referred to simply as Hai-Tang.

== Synopsis ==
In the Russian Empire, a young officer and a powerful Grand Duke both fall in love with a Chinese woman.

== Cast ==
- Anna May Wong as Hai-Tang
- Marcel Vibert as Le grand duc
- Robert Ancelin as Boris Ivanoff
- Armand Lurville as Le colonel Mouraview
- Hélène Darly as Yvette
- François Viguier as Viguier
- Gaston Dupray as Pierre Baron, le chanteur
- Claire Roman
- Mona Goya
- Gaston Jacquet

== Sources ==
- Chan, Anthony B. (2003). Perpetually Cool: The Many Lives of Anna May Wong (1905–1961). Lanham, MD: The Scarecrow Press. ISBN 0-8108-4789-2.
- Hodges, Graham Russell Gao (2004). Anna May Wong: From Laundryman's Daughter to Hollywood Legend (3rd ed.). Chicago: Chicago Review Press Incorporated. ISBN 978-1-64160-883-1.
- Lim, Shirley Jennifer (2019). Anna May Wong: Performing the Modern. Philadelphia: Temple University Press. ISBN 978-1-4399-1834-0.
- St. Pierre, Paul Matthew (2010). E.A. Dupont and his Contribution to British Film: Varieté, Moulin Rouge, Piccadilly, Atlantic, Two Worlds, Cape Forlorn. Fairleigh Dickinson University Press. ISBN 978-1611474336.

== See also ==
- Anna May Wong on film and television
