= Claude France =

French actress

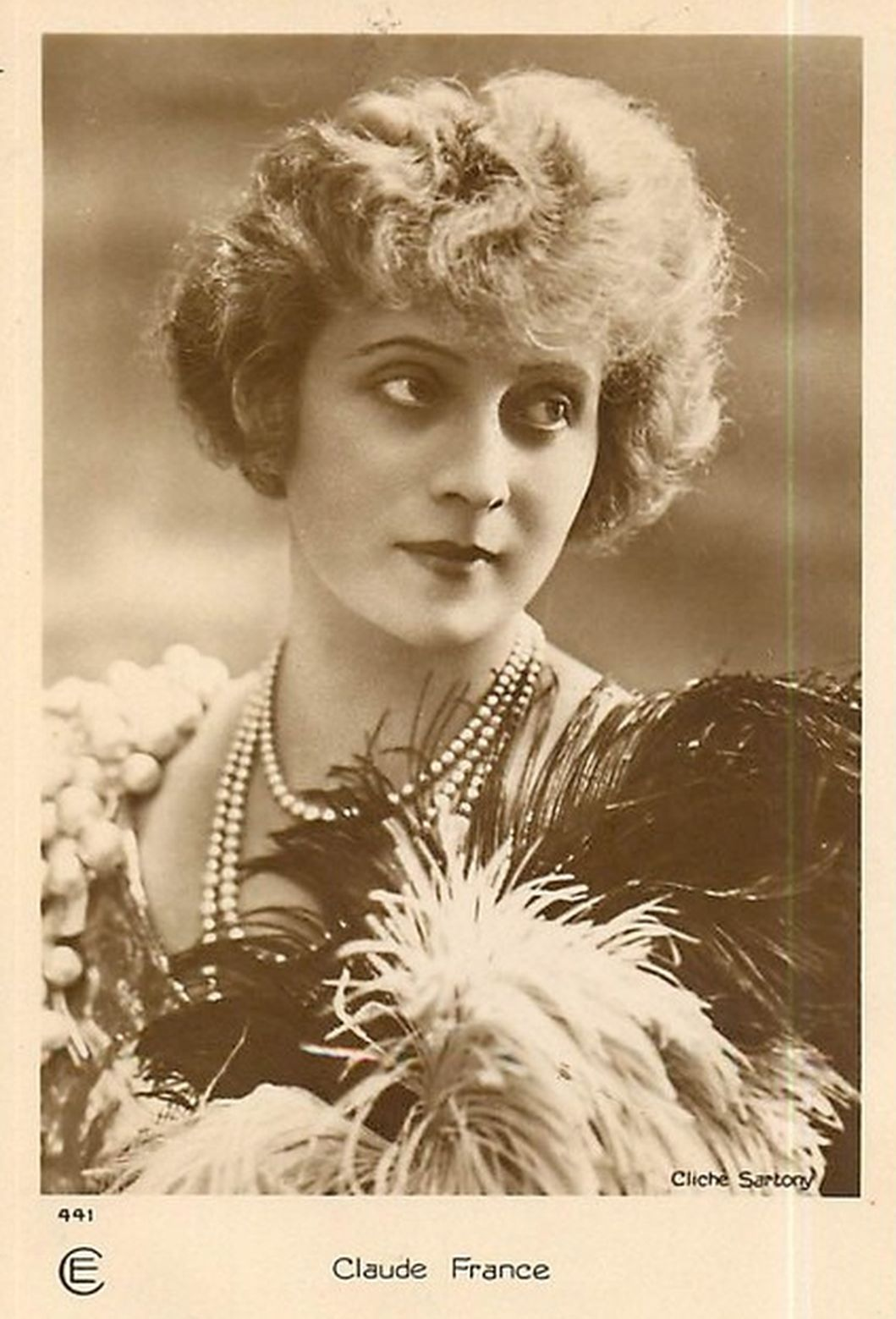
Claude France

Claude France (March 9, 1893 – January 3, 1928) born in Emden, Germany; was a German-born French actress. She was born Jane Joséphine Anna Françoise Wittig. She was discovered by Leon Gaumont who was impressed with her beauty. She had worked as a French spy, and was connected with the denunciation of Mati Hari, with whom she had a friendly relationship. For reasons not clear she committed suicide by gas poisoning at her home in Paris.

== Selected filmography ==
- Le Carnaval des vérités (1920)
- L'autre aile (1924)
- Modern Marriages (1924)
- Imperial Violets (1924)
- Prince Charming (1925)
- Boarding House Groonen (1925)
- Le Bossu (1925)
- The Abbot Constantine (1925)
- Fan Fan the Tulip (1925)
- Le berceau de dieu (1926)
- Simone (1926)
- Lady Harrington (1927)
- André Cornélis (1927)
- Madonna of the Sleeping Cars (1928)
- Island of Love (1929)

== Bibliography ==
- Jung, Uli & Schatzberg, Walter. Beyond Caligari: The Films of Robert Wiene. Berghahn Books, 1999.
