= Maxime Desjardins =

French actor

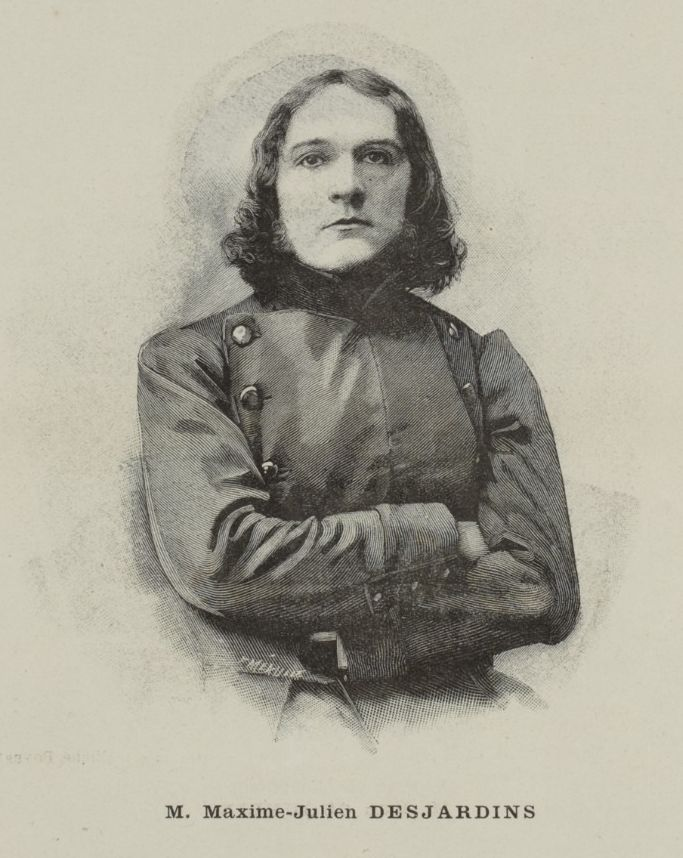
- Born: 17 September 1861; Auxerre, Yonne, France
- Died: 2 October 1936 (aged 75); Vence, Alpes-Maritimes, France
- Occupation: Actor
- Years active: 1912–1932 (film)

Maxime Desjardins (1861–1936) was a French stage actor and film actor of the silent and early sound era. He was a member of the Comédie-Française.

== Selected filmography ==
- The Eaglet (1913)
- Patrie (1917)
- J'accuse (1919)
- Les Trois Mousquetaires (1921)
- The Mysteries of Paris (1922)
- The Agony of the Eagles (1922)
- Le Bossu (1925)
- Simone (1926)
- Martyr (1927)
- La grande épreuve (1928)
- Atlantis (1930)
- The Mystery of the Yellow Room (1930)
- The Lacquered Box (1932)

== Bibliography ==
- Edwards, Paul M. World War I on Film: English Language Releases through 2014. McFarland, 2016.
- Fleischer, Mary. Embodied Texts: Symbolist Playwright-dancer Collaborations. Rodopi, 2007.
