= André Cornélis (1927 film) =

1927 film

- Directed by: Jean Kemm
- Written by: Pierre Maudru
- Produced by: Jacques Haïk
- Starring: Georges Lannes; Albert Bras; Claude France
- Cinematography: Paul Cotteret; René Gaveau; Karémine Mérobian
- Production company: Les Établissements Jacques Haïk
- Distributed by: Société Anonyme Française des Films Paramount
- Release date: 25 November 1927
- Running time: 125 minutes
- Country: France
- Languages: Silent; French intertitles

André Cornélis is a 1927 French silent film directed by Jean Kemm and starring Georges Lannes, Albert Bras and Claude France. It is based on the 1886 novel André Cornélis by Paul Bourget. Kemm had previously directed a 1918 film version of the story.

== Cast ==
- Georges Lannes as Jacques Termonde
- Albert Bras as Firmin
- Claude France as Madame Cornélis et Madame Termonde
- Simone Genevois as Germaine Durieux enfant
- Jeanne Kervich as Tante Louise
- Fernand Mailly as Rochedalle
- Suzy Pierson as Germaine Durieux
- Nicolas Roudenko as André Cornélis jeune
- Malcolm Tod as André et Justin Cornélis

== Bibliography ==
- Goble, Alan. The Complete Index to Literary Sources in Film. Walter de Gruyter, 1999.
