= Little Jacques (1923 film) =

1923 film

- Directed by: Georges Lannes; Georges Raulet
- Written by: Jules Clarétie (novel)
- Cinematography: Léon Wladimir Batifol; Marcel Eywinger
- Production company: Phocea Film
- Distributed by: Phocea Film
- Release date: 1923
- Country: France
- Languages: Silent; French intertitles

Little Jacques (French: Le petit Jacques) is a 1923 French silent drama film directed by Georges Lannes and Georges Raulet and starring André Rolane, Henri Baudin and Violette Jyl.

== Cast ==
- André Rolane as Jacques
- Henri Baudin as Noël Rambert
- Violette Jyl as Claire Mortal
- Hélène Darly as Marthe Rambert
- Marcel Vibert as Daniel Mortal
- Maurice Schutz as Doctor Artez
- Pierre Fresnay as Paul Laverdac
- Gaston Derigal as Gardonne
- Gilbert Dacheux as Butler
- Henri Deneyrieu as Gobergau
- Robert Guilbert as Commissar
- Jany Delille

== Bibliography ==
- Yves Desrichard. Julien Duvivier: Cinquante ans de noirs destins. Durante Editeur, 2001.
