= André Cornélis (1918 film) =

1918 film

- Directed by: Jean Kemm; Georges Denola
- Based on: André Cornélis by Paul Bourget
- Produced by: Jacques Haïk
- Starring: Romuald Joubé; Pierre Magnier; Henry Krauss
- Cinematography: René Gaveau
- Production company: Pathé Frères
- Distributed by: Pathé Frères
- Release date: September 6, 1918
- Country: France
- Languages: Silent; French intertitles

André Cornélis is a 1918 French silent film directed by Georges Denola and Jean Kemm and starring Romuald Joubé, Pierre Magnier and Henry Krauss. It is based on the 1886 novel André Cornélis by Paul Bourget. Kemm subsequently directed another version also titled André Cornélis in 1927.

== Plot ==
Mr. Cornélis dies mysteriously after discovering that one of his friends, Mr. Termonde was in love with his wife. The victim's son, André Cornélis suffers from his mother's remarriage to Mr. Dendermonde when he is still young. To find inner peace, André begins to investigate the death of his father and ends up killing his mother's second husband.

== Cast ==
- Romuald Joubé
- Pierre Magnier
- Henry Krauss
- Paul Duc
- Marie-Louise Derval
- Mary Dorska
- Jean Kemm

== Bibliography ==
- Goble, Alan. The Complete Index to Literary Sources in Film. Walter de Gruyter, 1999.
