= John Reynders =

British musician (1888–1953)

- Born: 1888; England
- Died: 1953 (aged 64–65); England
- Occupation: Composer

John Reynders (1888–1953) was a British musician and composer who worked on the film scores of a number of films.

== Selected filmography ==
- Moulin Rouge (1928)
- Under the Greenwood Tree (1929)
- The American Prisoner (1929)
- High Seas (1929)
- The Flying Scotsman (1929)
- Atlantik (1929)
- Blackmail (1929)
- Night Birds (1930)
- Atlantis (1930)
- The W Plan (1930)
- Loose Ends (1930)
- Why Sailors Leave Home (1930)
- Let's Love and Laugh (1931)
- Dance Pretty Lady (1931)
- The Flying Fool (1931)
- The Broken Rosary (1934)
- The Tell-Tale Heart (1934)
- Immortal Gentleman (1935)
- Midnight Menace (1937)
- Take a Chance (1937)
- The Last Chance (1937)
- Save a Little Sunshine (1938)
- Night Alone (1938)
- The Mysterious Mr. Davis (1939)
