= Nitchevo (1926 film) =

1926 film by Jacques de Baroncelli

- Directed by: Jacques de Baroncelli
- Written by: Jacques de Baroncelli
- Starring: Charles Vanel; Lillian Hall-Davis; Marcel Vibert
- Cinematography: Jimmy Berliet; Louis Chaix
- Production company: Société des Films Baroncelli
- Release date: 1926
- Country: France
- Languages: Silent; French intertitles

Nitchevo is a 1926 French silent film directed by Jacques de Baroncelli and starring Charles Vanel, Lillian Hall-Davis and Marcel Vibert. de Baroncelli remade it as a sound film in 1936.

== Cast ==
- Charles Vanel as Captain Cartier
- Lillian Hall-Davis as Sonia
- Marcel Vibert
- Raphaël Lievin as D'Arbères
- Suzy Vernon as Claire
- Jean d'Yd
- Mireille Barsac
- Henri Rudaux as Lt. de Kergoet
- Raoul Paoli
- Abel Sovet

== Bibliography ==
- Dayna Oscherwitz & MaryEllen Higgins. The A to Z of French Cinema. Scarecrow Press, 2009.
