= Joaquín Dicenta =

Spanish journalist, novelist, playwright, poet and Republican politician

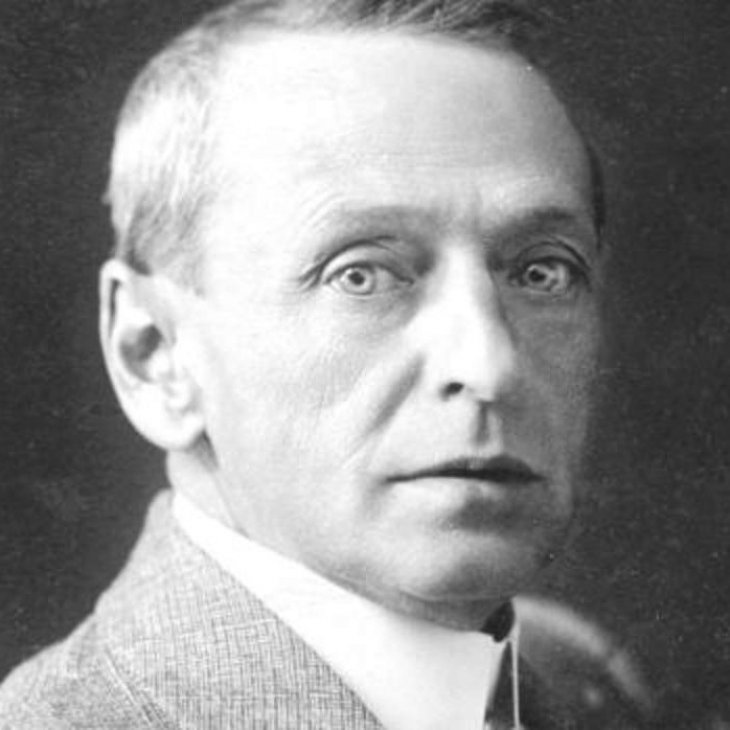

Madrid municipal councillor
- In office 1 July 1909 – 1 January 1912

Personal details
- Born: 3 February 1862 Calatayud or Vitoria, Spain
- Died: 21 February 1917 (aged 55) Alicante, Spain
- Occupation: Playwright, novelist, essayist, poet, politician

Joaquín Dicenta Benedicto (1862–1917) was a Spanish journalist, novelist, playwright, poet and Republican politician. His 1895 play Juan José, whose representation became a staple of every May Day, was the second-most performed in the Spanish repertory between 1895 and 1939.

== Biography ==
Born on 3 February 1862 in Calatayud, province of Zaragoza, some sources question the traditional birthplace, suggesting he was actually born in Vitoria.

Joaquín Dicenta started his studies in the Escolapios' of Getafe College (Madrid), and later in Alicante. He was expelled from the Artillery Academy in Segovia because of his unruly attitude.

His literary career began with the publication of his poems in the tabloid Eden. Gradually, as he gained fame, he began writing in other journals. He was a fervent opponent of the social order and this is reflected in his works.

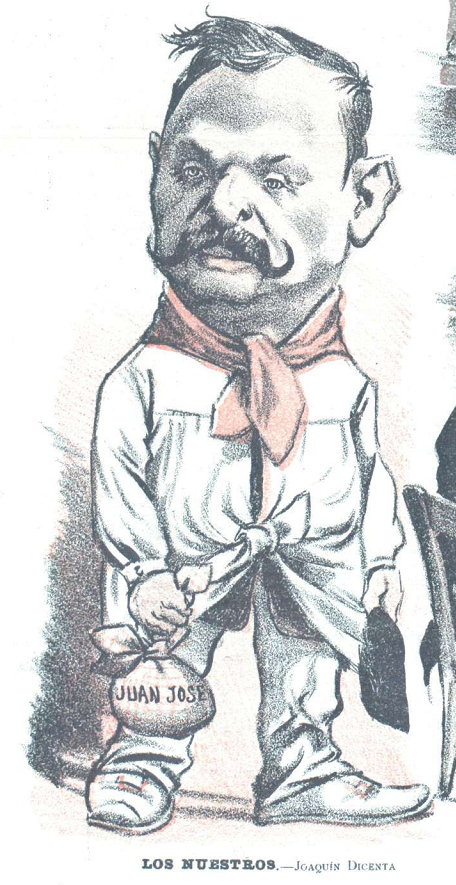
A 1902 caricature by Manuel Tovar depicting Dicenta while holding a bag reading Juan José

In April 1885, Dicenta promoted the creation of La Democracia Social, a shortly-lived Republican and Socialist newspaper. He was a close acquaintance of PSOE leader Pablo Iglesias, yet he never became a member of the party. Dicenta was also the first editor of Germinal, starting in 1897.

Many of Joaquín's works, including stories and novels have been lost. Perhaps the most famous of his works was the play Juan José (1895). The play's socialist tone and its tale of the conflict between employers and employees made it a huge success among the working class. It was performed yearly in Spain during May. The play's content of social struggle did not go down well with some Spanish bishops, who rejected it. But the play remained successful, being translated into several languages.

He was elected as Madrid municipal councillor at the May 1909 municipal election in representation of the district of Latina (drawing the most votes of any candidate in the municipality), running under a Republican platform that also got José María de la Torre Murillo and Silvestre Abellán elected in the constituency. He took office on 1 July 1909, delivering a speech as follows:

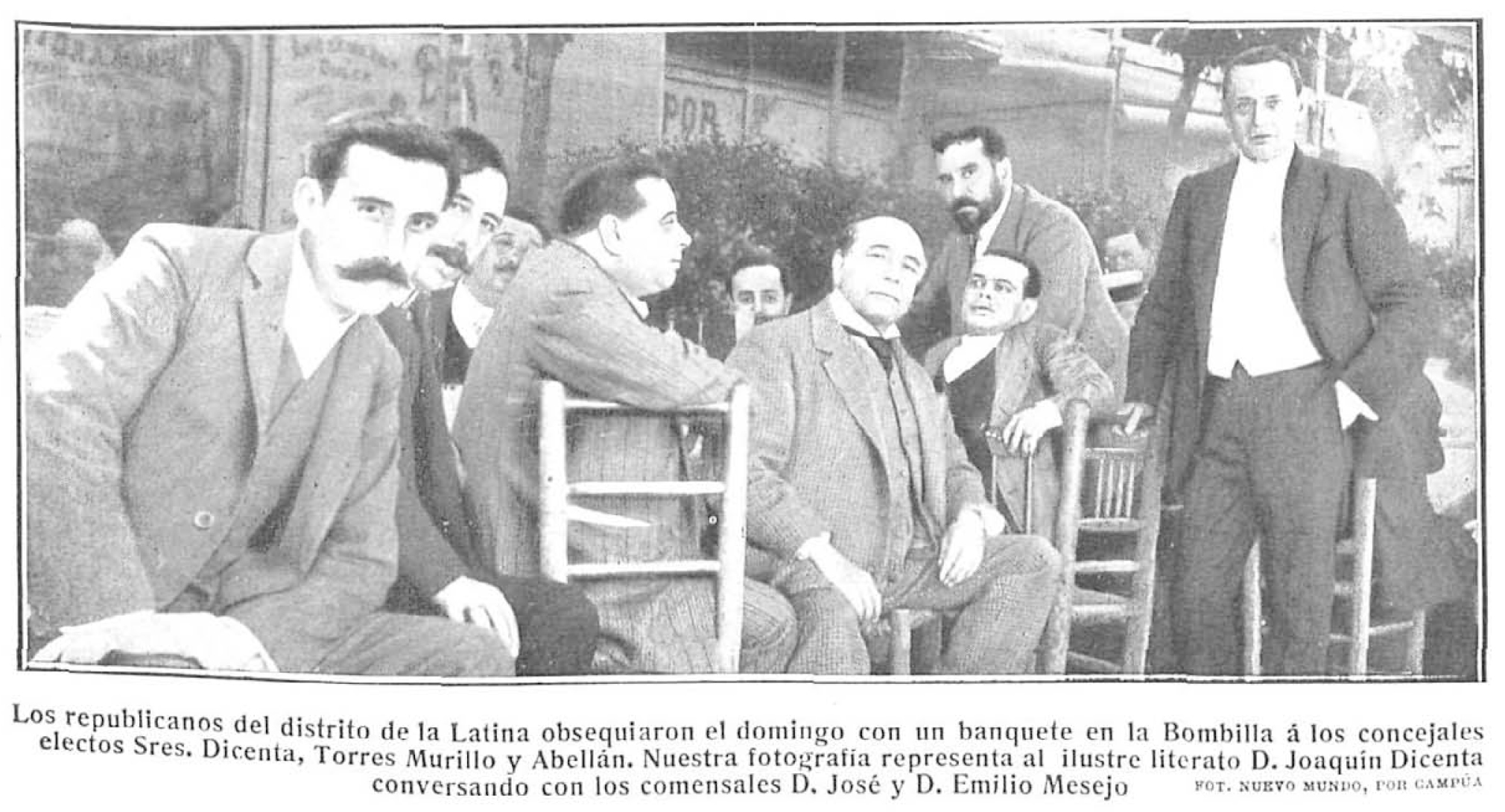
Party in La Bombilla celebrating the election of the Republican councillors for La Latina in May 1909. Dicenta is the standing person to the right.

"I object to the fact that the councillors elected by the sovereignty of the people are presided over and ordained by a Mayor of Royal order. I wish that the Mayor of the town seating there is not appointed by the King, for the simple reason that there was no King. Politics is made and manifested here, since that the thing representing the most reactionary part of the Ayuntamiento has been given the only existing prebends."

— Dicenta (1909); cfr. Soldevilla 1910, p. 223

During his mandate as municipal councillor, Dicenta was the drafter of the so-called "Proyecto Dicenta", a plan for the construction of schools in Madrid, described as the most ambitious in the scope of education policy in the first third of the 20th century in the municipality. The project was presented by Dicenta, Facundo Dorado and Ricardo Rodríguez Vilariño on 20 October 1911.

He died in Alicante on 21 February 1917. Later in that year, Mujeres (Estudios de mujer) a volume authored by Dicenta consisting of 25 chronicles dealing about portraits of women was posthumously published.

He spawned a saga of actors, including Joaquín Dicenta and Manuel Dicenta (sons), and Daniel Dicenta and Jacobo Dicenta (grandsons).

== Example of his poetry ==
"¡NO!"

¡Cuánto sufrí y qué solo!... Ni un amigo;
Ni una mano leal que se tendiera
En busca de la mía, ni siquiera
El placer de crearme un enemigo.

De mi angustia y dolor, solo testigo,
De mi terrible vida, compañera,
Fue una pobre mujer, una cualquiera
Que hambre, pena y amor partió conmigo.

Y hoy que mi triunfo asegurado se halla,
Tú, amigo, por el éxito ganado,
Me dices que la arroje de mi lado,
Que una mujer así, denigra... ¡Calla!
Con ella he padecido y he triunfado;
¡Y el triunfo no autoriza a ser canalla!

== Works ==
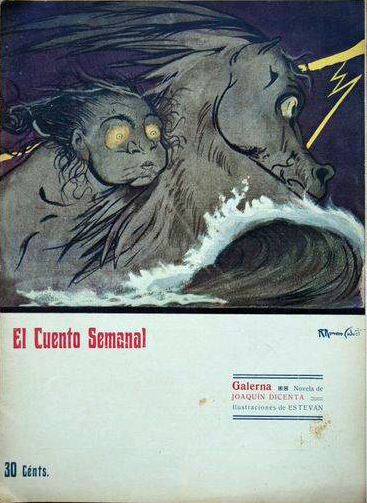
Cover of the short novel La Galerna (1908) published in El Cuento Semanal. The cover is illustrated by Romero Calvet, while the story features inside illustrations by Estevan.

Plays

- El suicidio de Werther (1888)
- Honra y Vida (1888)
- La mejor ley (1889)
- Los irresponsables (1890)
- Luciano (1894)
- Juan José (1895)
- El señor feudal (1896)
- Aurora (1902)
- Daniel (1907)

Long novels

- Rebeldía (1910)
- Los Bárbaros (1912)
- Encarnación (1913)
- Mi Venus (1915)
