= Gaston Jacquet =

French actor

- Born: Gaston Émile Marius Jacquet; 14 August 1883; Ardèche, France
- Died: 28 January 1970 (aged 86); Thonex, Switzerland
- Occupation: Actor

Gaston Émile Marius Jacquet (14 August 1883 – 28 January 1970) was a French actor.

Jacquet was born in Lanas, Ardèche, France and died in 1970 in Thonex in Switzerland.

== Selected filmography ==
- Les Trois Mousquetaires (1921)
- The Hurricane on the Mountain (1922)
- Paris (1924)
- Le Bossu (1925)
- The Ways of Love Are Strange (1927)
- The Orchid Dancer (1928)
- Nile Water (1928)
- Suzy Saxophone (1928)
- The Maelstrom of Paris (1928)
- The Mystery of the Eiffel Tower (1928)
- Their Son (1929)
- House in the Sun (1929)
- Sin of a Beautiful Woman (1929)
- Latin Quarter (1929)
- The Girl with the Whip (1929)
- When the White Lilacs Bloom Again (1929)
- The Road to Paradise (1930)
- Hai-Tang (1930)
- Illusions (1930)
- There Is a Woman Who Never Forgets You (1930)
- Miss Europe (1930)
- David Golder (1931)
- The Indictment (1931)
- Coquecigrole (1931)
- Abduct Me (1932)
- A Man's Neck (1933)
- Charlemagne (1933)
- The Princess's Whim (1934)
- Last Hour (1934)
- Le Golem (1936)
- Girls in Distress (1939)
- The Emigrant (1940)
- Hopes (1941)
- The Snow on the Footsteps (1942)
- The House of Lovers (1957)

== Bibliography ==
- Powrie, Phil & Rebillard, Éric. Pierre Batcheff and stardom in 1920s French cinema. Edinburgh University Press, 2009
