= Atlantik (film) =

1929 film by Ewald André Dupont

Atlantic
- Directed by: Ewald André Dupont
- Written by: Victor Kendall; Ewald André Dupont
- Based on: The Berg by Ernest Raymond
- Starring: Fritz Kortner; Elsa Wagner; Heinrich Schroth; Julia Serda
- Cinematography: Charles Rosher
- Music by: John Reynders
- Production company: British International Pictures
- Distributed by: Süd-Film
- Release date: 28 October 1929
- Running time: 114 minutes
- Country: United Kingdom
- Language: German

Atlantic is a 1929 British-made German language drama film directed by Ewald André Dupont and starring Fritz Kortner, Elsa Wagner and Heinrich Schroth. The film is a German language version of the 1929 film Atlantic made at Elstree Studios by British International Pictures. Following the introduction of sound films, leading film companies attempted to cater to different markets by producing multiple-language versions of their films. Atlantic was released in four versions: English, French, German and silent, for cinemas not yet converted to the new format. The German version was filmed at the same time as the British version, with each scene first being filmed in English for the British version, then the same scene being filmed in German by a German cast, using the same sets. The film was the first fully talking film to be released in Germany, where it was a major hit. It is based on the 1929 play The Berg by Ernest Raymond which itself was based on the Titanic disaster.

== Cast ==
- Fritz Kortner as Heinrich Thomas, author
- Elsa Wagner as Anna, his wife
- Heinrich Schroth as Harry von Schroeder
- Julia Serda as Clara, his wife
- Elfriede Borodin as Betty, their daughter
- Lucie Mannheim as Monica, young married couple
- Francis Lederer as Peter, young married couple
- Willi Forst as Poldi
- Hermann Vallentin as Dr. Holtz
- Theodor Loos as Pastor Wagner
- Georg John as Wendt, Thomas' servant
- Philipp Manning as Von Oldenburg, Captain of Atlantic
- Georg August Koch as Lersner, First Officer
- Syd Crossley as Marconi-Telegraphist

== See also ==
- List of early sound feature films (1926–1929)

== Bibliography ==
- Hardt, Ursula (2021) [1996]. From Caligari to California: Erich Pommer's life in the International Film Wars. Berghahn Books. p. 230. ISBN 978-1571810250. JSTOR j.ctt1c0gm1x. OL 976147M.
- St. Pierre, Paul Matthew. E.A. Dupont and his Contribution to British Film: Varieté, Moulin Rouge, Piccadilly, Atlantic, Two Worlds, Cape Forlorn. Fairleigh Dickinson University Press, 2010. ISBN 1611474337.
