= René Alexandre =

French actor (1885–1946)

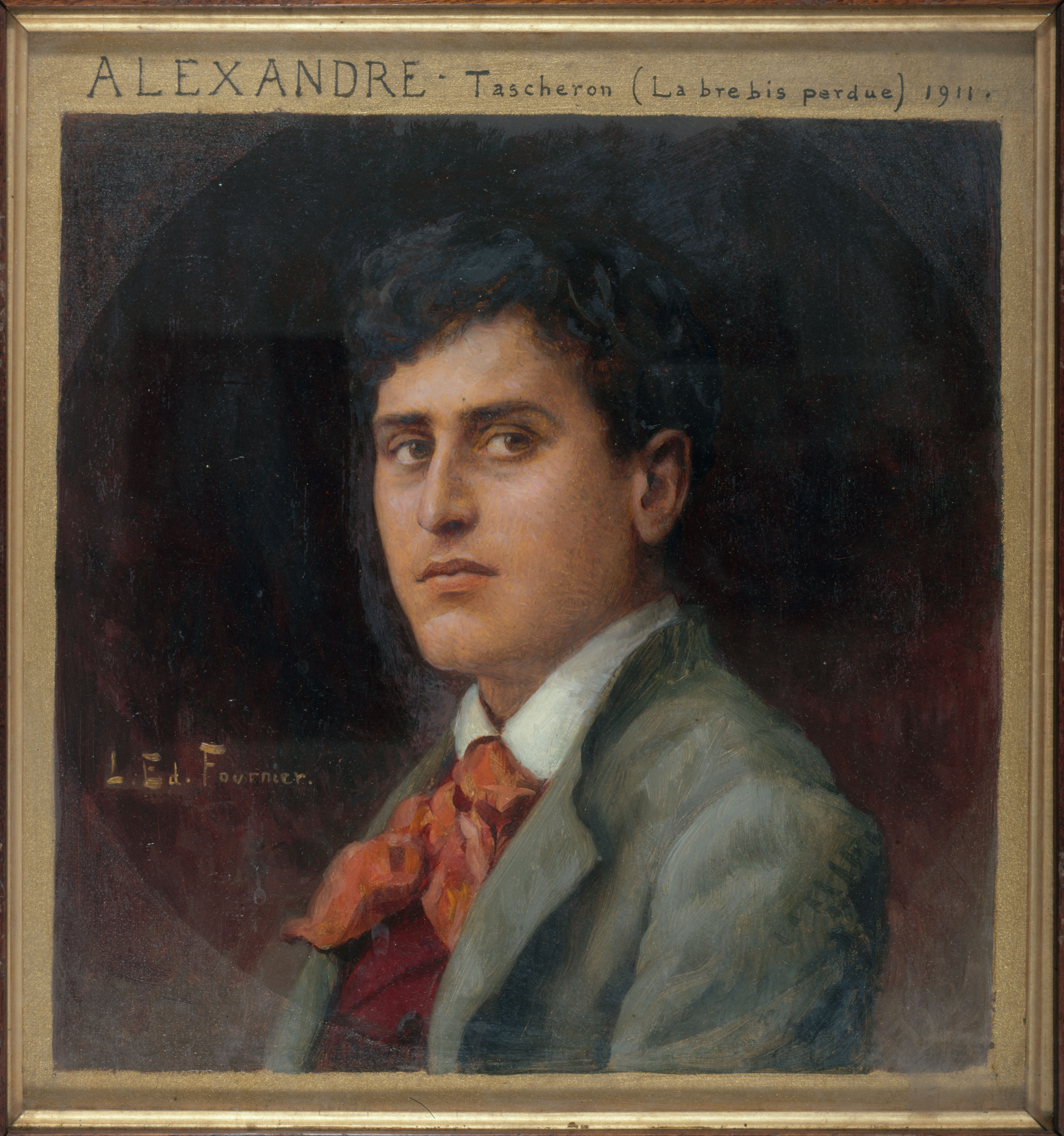
René Alexandre by Louis-Édouard Fournier, musée Carnavalet.

René Alexandre (22 December 1885 – 19 August 1946) was a French actor.

René Alexandre was born in Reims and died in Vitré, Ille-et-Vilaine in 1946. He was married to actress Gabrielle Robinne from 1912 until his death.

== Biography ==
Originally from Nancy, France, his father Jean-Joseph Alexandre was a salesman when he married Caroline Haguenauer, a native of Verdun and daughter of a rabbi, in Reims in 1884. René is the eldest of their five children.

He learned his craft as an actor under Paul Mounet and graduated from the Conservatoire national supérieur d'art dramatique in 1908 with two first prizes (tragedy and comedy). He played Ramuntcho by Pierre Loti at the Odéon, then joined the Comédie-Française in 1908. He was a member from 1920 to 1944 and was named an honorary member in 1945.

Mobilized as an Infantry sergeant in August 1914, René Alexandre remained employed behind the lines.Classified in the auxiliary service for medical reasons in April 1915, he was transferred to the Train des équipages (equipment train) and then to the motor vehicle service of the 13th Artillery Regiment. He was wounded in the arm by shrapnel from an airplane bomb in Bar-le-Duc in January 1916. Returning to the front, he was promoted to adjutant in December 1916 and awarded the Croix de guerre 1914–1918 (France) in September 1917. He was demobilized in March 1919.

Founding president of the Association des Comédiens combattants (Association of Combatant Actors), he was made a Commander of the Legion of Honour. In 1912, he founded a retirement home for veteran actors in Grosley-sur-Risle, where he served as mayor from 1935 to 1940, himself being a veteran of World War I.

As a Jew, he had to stop his activities in 1940 due to the German occupation of France.

He appeared in 53 films between 1909 and 1940. In 1912, he married Gabrielle Robinne (1886-1980), a member of the Comédie-Française and film actress, in Limeil-Brévannes (Seine-et-Oise). They are both buried in the cemetery of Saint-Cloud (Hauts-de-Seine). They had moved to this town in 1922, to 21 Rue Gounod.

== Filmography (partial) ==
- Fouquet (1910) the man in the iron mask
- The Hunchback of Notre Dame (1911)
- The Lacquered Box (1932)
- A Man's Neck (1933)
- Paris-New York (1940) of Yves Mirande
