= Patrie (1917 film) =

1917 film by Albert Capellani

Patrie is a 1917 French film by Albert Capellani after the drama of Victorien Sardou. The film featured Henry Krauss as the Count of Rysoor, Paul Capellani as Karloo Van der Noot, Léon Bernard as Ionas, and Maxime Desjardins as the Duke of Alba.
