= Jean Kemm =

French actor and director

Jean Kemm (15 May 1874–1939) was a French stage and theater actor and film director.

Kemm was born Jules Adolphe Félix Bécheret in the 2nd arrondissement of Paris and died in Paris in 1939.

== Selected filmography ==
- André Cornélis (1918)
- Vidocq (1923)
- Le Bossu (1925)
- André Cornélis (1927)
- Hai-Tang (1930)
- Atlantis (1930)
- The Polish Jew (1931)
- The Lacquered Box (1932)
- The Heir of the Bal Tabarin (1933)
- The Surprises of Divorce (1933)
- Miss Helyett (1933)
- The Barber of Seville (1933)
- Liberty (1938)
