= Nitchevo (1936 film) =

1936 film

- Directed by: Jacques de Baroncelli
- Written by: André Beucler; Steve Passeur; T.H. Robert; Jacques de Baroncelli
- Starring: Harry Baur; Marcelle Chantal; Ivan Mosjoukine; Lisette Lanvin; Habib Benglia; Paul Velsa; Jean Tissier; Abel Tarride; Paul Azaïs; Jean Max; George Rigaud
- Cinematography: Jean Bachelet
- Edited by: Jean Delannoy
- Music by: Arthur Honegger
- Production company: Mega Films
- Release date: 18 December 1936
- Running time: 80 minutes
- Country: France
- Language: French

Nitchevo (Russian for "nothing", "ничего" [nʲɪʨɪˈvo]) is a 1936 French drama film directed by Jacques de Baroncelli and starring Harry Baur, Marcelle Chantal and George Rigaud. It is a remake of the 1926 silent film of the same name.

The film's sets were designed by the art directors Serge Piménoff and Georges Wakhévitch

== Cast ==
- Harry Baur as Le commandant Robert Cartier
- Marcelle Chantal as Thérèse Sabianne
- George Rigaud as Hervé de Kergoët
- Jean-Max as Sarak
- Lisette Lanvin as Claire
- Ivan Mozzhukhin as L'officier Meuter
- Paul Azaïs as Lemoule, un matelot
- Jean Tissier as L'inventeur Ducourjour
- Habib Benglia as Un matelot
- Jean Daurand as Un matelot
- Abel Tarride as Arbères
- Paul Velsa as Le cuisinier
- Lucien Coëdel as Le radio
- Marcel Lupovici as Le lieutenant
- Philippe Richard as Le gardien chef
- Philippe Derevel
- Jean Dunot
- Rodolphe Marcilly
- André Siméon

== Reception ==
Writing for Night and Day in 1937, Graham Greene gave the film a mildly poor review, complaining primarily that the film "has a bad story - and a very obscure one". Greene described the film as formulaic in its presentation, however he conceded that "the picture is worth a visit for the final situation in a sunk submarine and for the acting of M. Harry Baur".

== Bibliography ==
- Dayna Oscherwitz & MaryEllen Higgins. The A to Z of French Cinema. Scarecrow Press, 2009.
