= Henry Krauss =

French actor

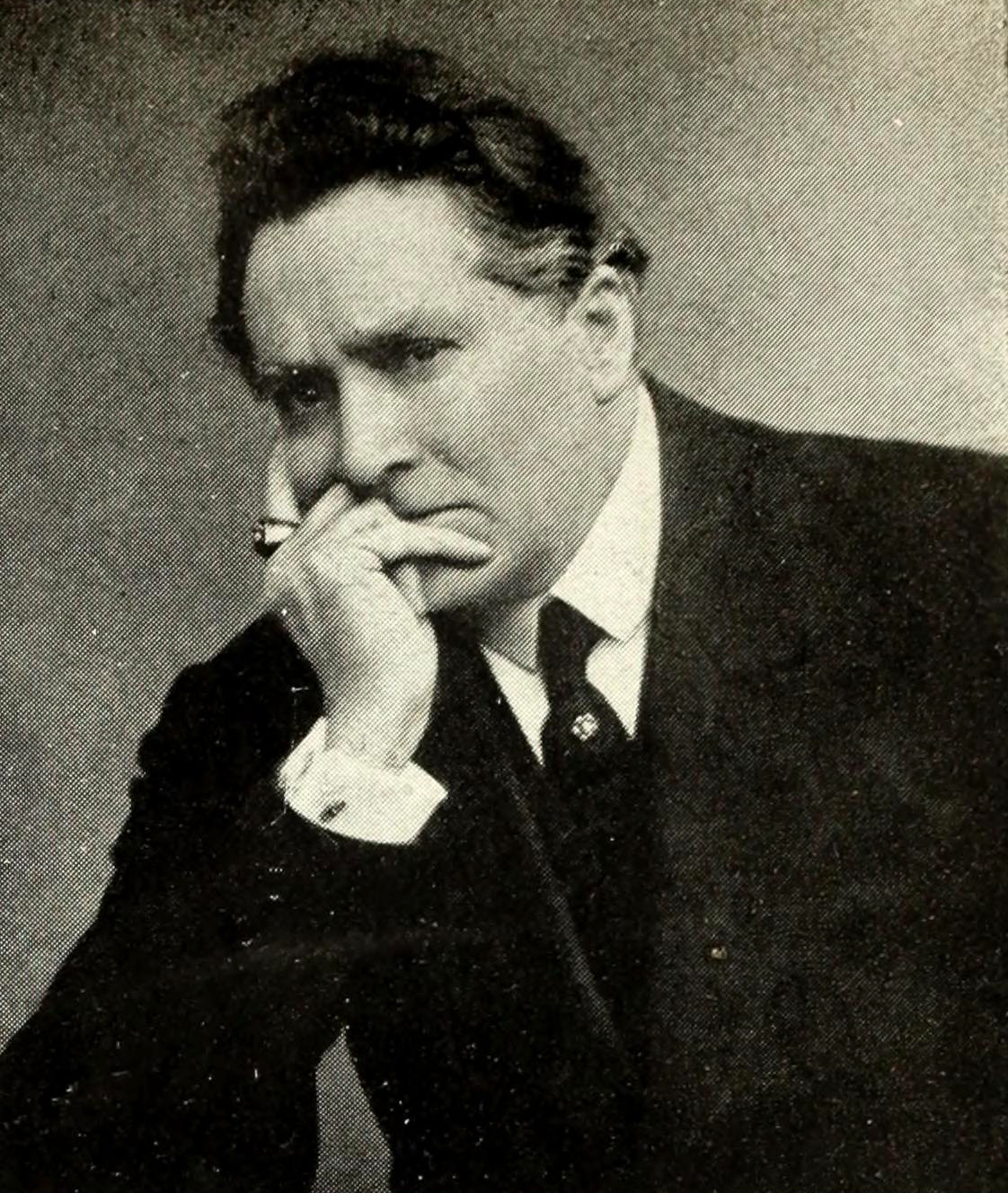
- Born: 26 April 1866
- Died: 15 December 1935 (aged 69)
- Other name: Henri Krauss
- Occupation: Actor
- Children: Jacques Krauss

Henry Krauss (26 April 1866 – 15 December 1935) was a French actor of stage and screen. He is sometimes credited as Henri Krauss. He was the father of the art director Jacques Krauss.

== Partial filmography ==
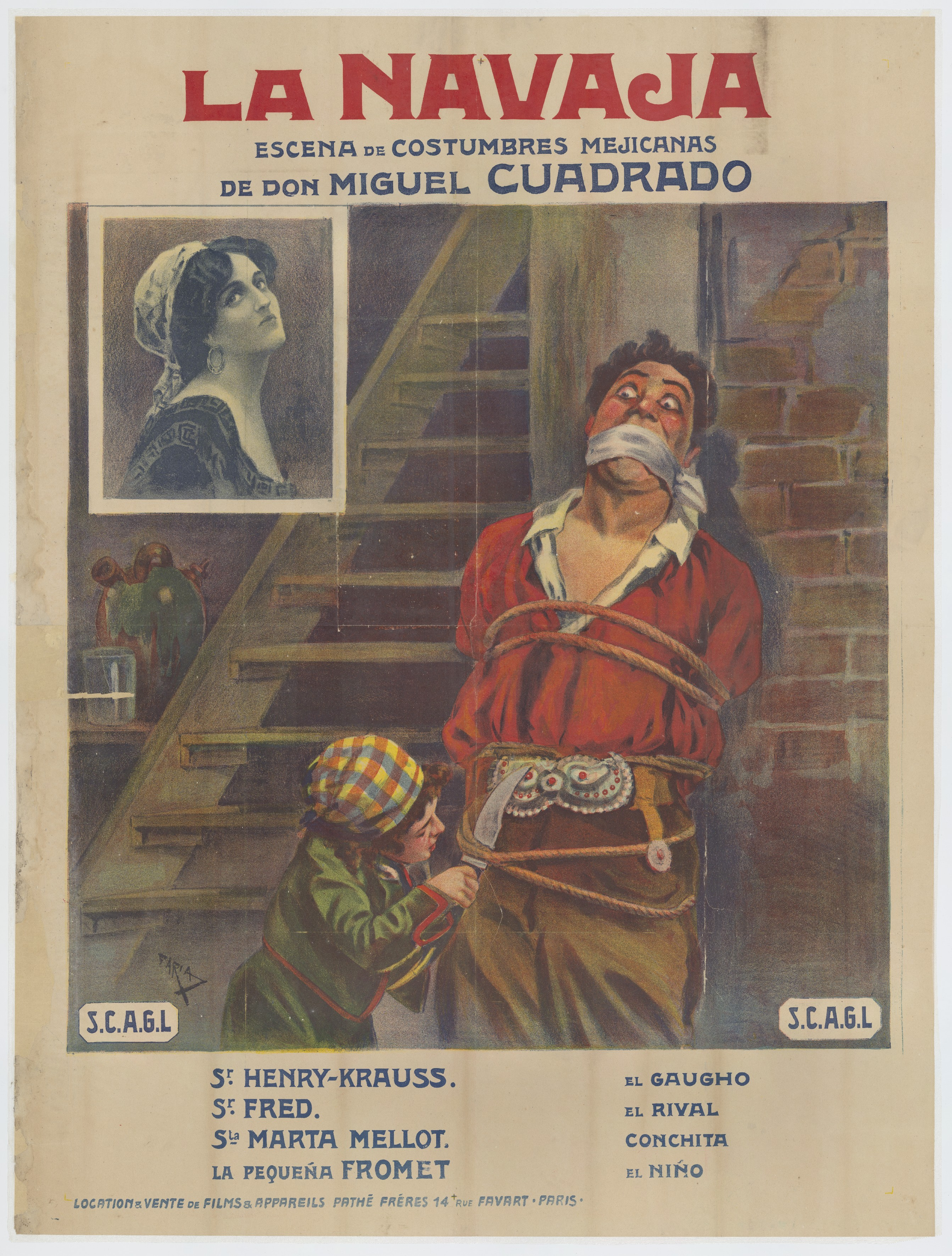
Spanish language poster by Faria for the film La navaja by Pathé, starring Henry Krauss, 1911. Collection EYE Film Institute Netherlands.

- The Hunchback of Notre Dame (1911, Short) - Quasimodo
- Les mystères de Paris (1912)
- Les misérables (1912-1913, episode:1, 2) - Jean Valjean
- Germinal (1913) - Etienne Lautier
- La Glu (1913) - Dr. Paul Cézambre / Dr. Williams (USA)
- Le chevalier de Maison-Rouge (1914)
- Patrie (1914) - Comte de Rysoor
- The Corsican Brothers (1917) - Dumas père
- Le chemineau (1917) - Le chemineau
- André Cornélis (1918)
- Marion Delorme (1918)
- L'énigme (1918)
- Honneur d'artiste (1920) - Charles Fabrice
- Enchantment (1920) - John Desmond
- The Three Masks (1921) - Della Corda
- Quatre-vingt-treize (1921) - Cimourdain
- Fromont jeune et Risler aîné (1921) - Guillaume Risler aîné
- L'empereur des pauvres (1922) - Jean Sarrias - l'oncle de Silvette, révolté contre la société
- The Black Diamond (1922) - Monsieur de Mitry
- Le bossu (1923)
- Les ombres qui passent (1924) - Barclay père
- Credo ou la tragédie de Lourdes (1924) - Vincent Leverrier
- Paris (1924) - François Roullet
- La closerie des Genets (1925) - Kérouan
- Le bossu (1925)
- The Red Head (1925) - Monsieur Lepic
- Napoleon (1927) - Moustache
- Le bonheur du jour (1927) - Le docteur Plessiers
- Lights of Paris (1928)
- The Divine Voyage (1929) - Claude Ferjac
- La symphonie pathétique (1930) - Christian Marks
- The Prosecutor Hallers (1930) - Le psychiatre Köhler
- Les Misérables (1934) - Monseigneur Myriel (final film role)
