= The Three Masks (1921 film) =

1921 film

- Directed by: Henry Krauss
- Written by: Henry Krauss
- Based on: The Three Masks by Charles Méré
- Starring: Henry Krauss; Henri Rollan; Gine Avril
- Cinematography: René Guichard
- Production company: Pathé Frères
- Distributed by: Pathé Frères
- Release date: 1 April 1921
- Country: France
- Languages: Silent; French intertitles

The Three Masks (French: Les trois masques) is a 1921 French silent drama film directed by Henry Krauss and starring Krauss, Henri Rollan and Gine Avril. It is based on the 1908 play of the same title by Charles Méré. The film was remade in 1929 as one of the earliest French sound films.

== Cast ==
- Henry Krauss as Della Corda
- Henri Rollan as Paolo Della Corba
- Gine Avril as Speranza
- Charlotte Barbier-Krauss as Signora Della Corda
- Georges Wague as Sebastiano
- Maurice Schutz as Luigi

== Bibliography ==
- Goble, Alan. The Complete Index to Literary Sources in Film. Walter de Gruyter, 1999.
