= Multiple-language version =

Film produced in different language versions

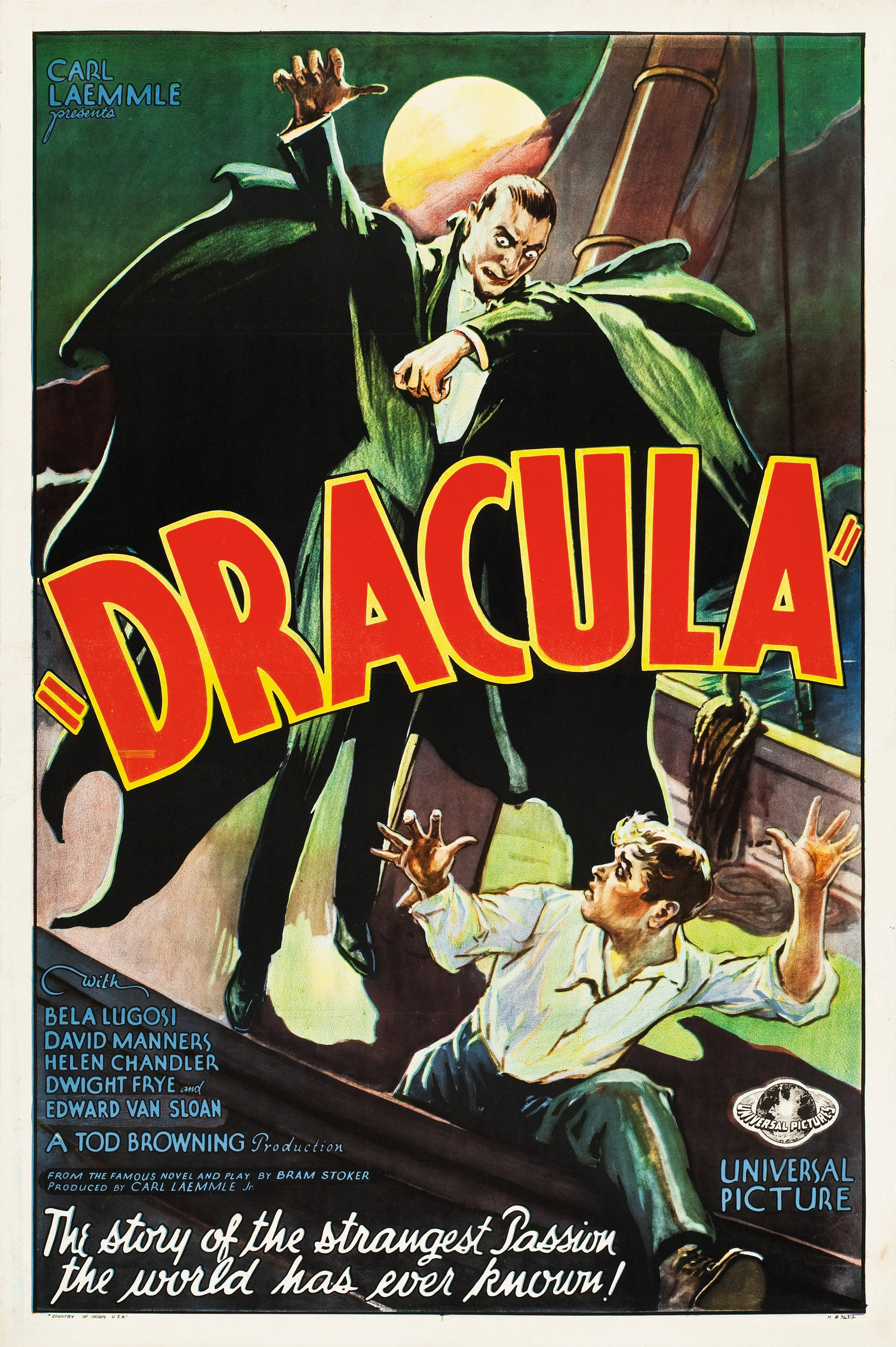
Dracula (1931 English-language film)

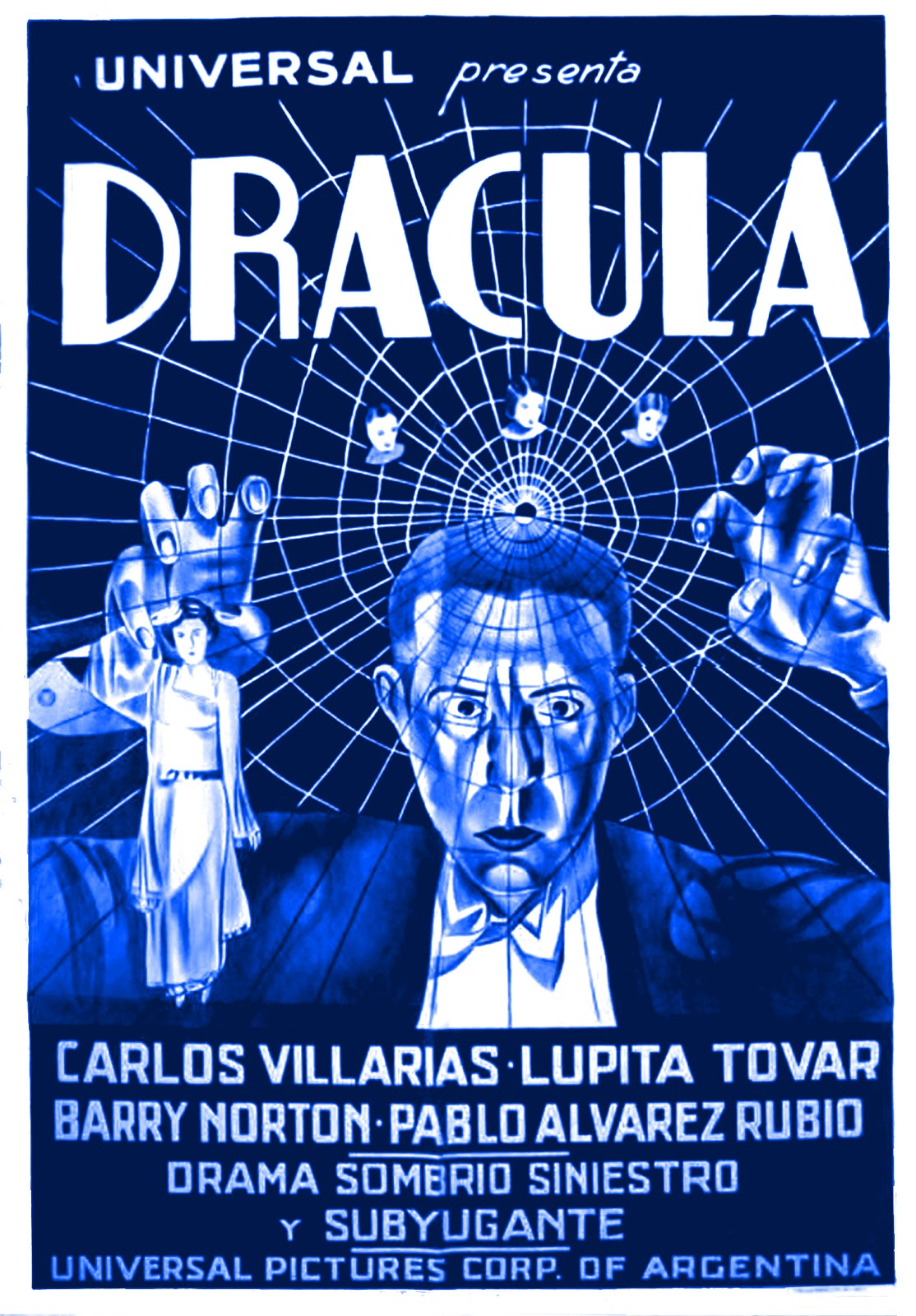
Dracula (1931 Spanish-language film)

A multiple-language version film (often abbreviated to MLV) or foreign language version is a film, especially from the early talkie era, produced in several different languages for international markets. To offset the marketing restrictions of making sound films in only one language, it became common practice for American and European studios to produce foreign-language versions of their films using the same sets, crew, costumes, etc but often with different actors fluent in each language. The plot was sometimes adjusted with new or removed scenes and script alterations. The first foreign-language versions appeared in 1929 and largely replaced the International Sound Version method for many major releases. The most common languages used for these productions were English, Spanish, French and German.

The idea of whether these were different / recut versions of the same film or separate films in their own right is open to debate and interpretation by the viewer. Filming in different years could be used as the basis for this as clearly two versions of a film 10 years apart are considered separate films. However, The Tunnel was filmed three times (1933 Germany, 1933 France, 1935 England) with two in the same year and another 2 years apart making the determination difficult for these cases.

Musicals in particular proliferated during the early talkie era, partially because between-song, plot-driven narration could often be easily replaced with intertitles or, as in the case with MLVs, be reshot using local actors. Numerous internationally renowned artists worked on MLVs, some repeatedly. Many are still widely known to modern audiences, including Marlene Dietrich, Greta Garbo, Alfred Hitchcock, Buster Keaton, Fritz Lang and John Wayne. Hal Roach was a great proponent of MLVs and an early adopter of the practice. Within a two-year period between 1929 and 1931 he oversaw the production of many of them for his top acts, including Laurel and Hardy, Charley Chase, Harry Langdon and Our Gang.

Although a vast number of MLVs were made, many of the early export versions are thought lost and relatively few are available today. Some notable exceptions are Anna Christie (1930); The Blue Angel (1930); Dracula's Spanish-language incarnation, Drácula (1931); M (1931); The Threepenny Opera (1931) and various Laurel and Hardy films.

Within a few years the practice had peaked, largely because of the additional production complications and expenses incurred, along with improvements in dubbing and subtitling techniques. Many multiple-language version films were US-European co-productions and the Nazis' rise to power in the early 1930s effectively sealed their fate. European co-productions continued on a reduced scale through until the end of the 1950s before dying out almost completely. In India, however, multiple-language versions are still produced on a semi-regular basis, particularly in the case of big budget epics.

== List of multiple-language versions ==
Original film	Year	Production studio	Foreign versions	Notes
Atlantic	1929	British International Pictures (BIP)	Atlantik 1929 (German); Atlantis 1930 (French)	
Berth Marks and The Laurel-Hardy Murder Case	1929 and 1930	Hal Roach Studios	Feu mon oncle 1930 (French); Spuk um Mitternacht 1931 (German); Noche de duendes 1930 (Spanish)	All star Laurel and Hardy/ Plots and footage from the English shorts were combined into much longer foreign ones.
Blaze o' Glory	1929	Sono Art	Sombras de gloria 1930 (Spanish)	
Half Way to Heaven	1929	Paramount	Sombras del circo 1931 (Spanish); À mi-chemin du ciel 1931 (French); Der Sprung ins Nichts 1932 (German); Halvvägs till himlen 1932 (Swedish)	
His Glorious Night	1929	MGM	Olimpia 1930 (Spanish); Si l'empereur savait ça 1930 (French); Olympia 1930 (German)	
The Hollywood Revue	1929	MGM	Wir schalten um auf Hollywood: Eine Reportage Revue 1931 (German)	Buster Keaton appears in both versions Laurel and Hardy appear only in the English version.
Innocents of Paris	1929	Paramount	La chanson de Paris 1930 (French)	
The Letter	1929	Paramount	La carta 1931 (Spanish); La lettre 1930 (French); Weib im Dschungel 1931 (German); La donna bianca 1931 (Italian)	Jeanne Eagels, the star of the English-language original, died in 1929.
The Love Parade	1929	Paramount	Parade d'amour 1930 (French)	
Madame X	1929	MGM	La mujer X 1931 (Spanish)	
Melody of the Heart (German: Melodie des Herzens)	1929	UFA	Melody of the Heart 1929 (English); Mélodie du cœur 1929 (French); Vasárnap délután 1929 (Hungarian)	
The Night Belongs to Us (German: Die Nacht gehört uns)	1929	UFA	La nuit est à nous 1930 (French)	
Nothing but the Truth	1929	Paramount	La pura verdad 1931 (Spanish); Rien que la vérité 1930 (French); Die nackte Wahrheit 1932 (German)	
Pointed Heels	1929	Paramount	Gente alegre 1931 (Spanish)	
The Sacred Flame	1929	Warner Bros.	La llama sagrada 1931 (Spanish); Die heilige Flamme 1931 (German)	
The Trial of Mary Dugan	1929	MGM	El proceso de Mary Dugan 1931 (Spanish); Le procès de Mary Dugan 1930 (French); Mordprozeß Mary Dugan 1931 (German)	
The Unholy Night	1929	MGM	Le spectre vert 1930 (French)	
All Teed Up	1930	Hal Roach Studios	Le Joueur de Golf 1930 (French); El Jugador de Golf 1930 (Spanish)	
Almost a Honeymoon	1930	BIP/Albatros	Le Monsieur de minuit 1931 (French)	
Anna Christie	1930	MGM	Anna Christie 1931 (German)	Both star Greta Garbo.
At the Villa Rose	1930	Julius Hagen/Jacques Haïk	Le mystère de la villa rose 1930 (French)	
The Bad Man	1930	First National	El hombre malo 1930 (Spanish); Lopez, le bandit 1930 (French)	
Bear Shooters	1930	Hal Roach Studios	[title unknown] 1930 (French) [title unknown] 1930 (German); Los Cazadores De Osos 1930 (Spanish)	Our Gang shorts.
Behind the Make-Up	1930	Paramount	Maquillage 1932 (French)	
Below Zero	1930	Hal Roach Studios	Tiembla y Titubea 1930 (Spanish)	Both star Laurel and Hardy.
The Benson Murder Case	1930	Paramount	El cuerpo del delito 1930 (Spanish)	
The Big Fight	1930	James Cruze Productions	La fuerza del querer 1930 (Spanish)	
The Big House	1930	MGM	El presidio 1930 (Spanish); Révolte dans la prison 1931 (French); Menschen hinter Gittern 1931 (German)	
The Big Kick	1930	Hal Roach Studios	La estación de gasolina 1930 (Spanish)	
The Big Pond	1930	Paramount	La grande mare 1930 (French)	
The Big Trail	1930	Fox	La gran jornada 1930 (Spanish); La Piste des géants 1931 (French); Die große Fahrt 1931 (German); Il grande sentiero 1931 (Italian)	John Wayne's first starring role.
Blotto	1930	Hal Roach Studios	Une Nuit Extravagante 1930 (French); La Vida Nocturna 1930 (Spanish)	All star Laurel and Hardy.
The Blue Angel (German: Der blaue Engel)	1930	UFA	The Blue Angel 1930 (English)	Both star Marlene Dietrich.
The Boudoir Diplomat	1930	Universal	Don Juan diplomático 1931 (Spanish); Boudoir diplomatique 1931 (French); Liebe auf Befehl 1931 (German)	
Brats	1930	Hal Roach Studios	Les bons petits diables 1930 (French); Glückliche Kindheit 1931 (German)	All star Laurel and Hardy.
Burglars (German: Einbrecher)	1930	UFA	Flagrant délit 1931 (French)	
Call of the Flesh	1930	MGM	Sevilla de mis amores 1930 (Spanish); Le chanteur de Séville 1931 (French)	
The Cat Creeps	1930	Universal	La Voluntad del muerto 1930 (Spanish)	
Chacun sa chance (French)	1930	Marcel Hellmann/Pathé-Natan	Kopfüber ins Glück 1931 (German)	
Children of Chance	1930	BIP	Kinder des Glücks 1931 (German)	
Common Clay	1930	Fox	Del mismo barro 1930 (Spanish)	
Dangerous Paradise	1930	Paramount	Dans une île perdue 1931 (French); Niebezpieczny raj 1931 (Polish); Tropennächte 1931 (German); La riva dei bruti 1931 (Italian); Farornas paradis 1931 (Swedish)	
The Devil's Holiday	1930	Paramount	La fiesta del diablo 1931 (Spanish); Les vacances du diable 1931 (French); Sonntag des Lebens 1931 (German); La vacanza del diavolo 1931 (Italian); En kvinnas morgondag 1931 (Swedish)	
Dollar Dizzy	1930	Hal Roach Studios	Chercheuses d'or 1930 (French); El príncipe del dólar 1931 (Spanish)	
Doughboys	1930	MGM	De frente, marchen 1930 (Spanish)	Both star Buster Keaton.
Dreyfus	1930	Richard Oswald Produktion/BIP	Dreyfus 1931 (English remake)	
East Is West	1930	Universal	Oriente es Occidente 1930 (Spanish)	
Eskimo (Norwegian)	1930	Nordisk Film/Skandinavisk Talefilm	The White God 1932 (German: Der weiße Gott)	
L'étrange fiancée (French)	1930	Frantisek Horký	Operené stíny 1931 (Czech)	
Fast Work	1930	Hal Roach Studios	Locuras de amor 1931 (Spanish)	
Father and Son (German: Väter und Söhne)	1930	Minerva/Terra	Markurells i Wadköping 1931 (Swedish)	
Fire in the Opera House (German: Brand in der Oper)	1930	Carl Froelich-Film	La barcarolle d'amour 1930 (French)	
The First Seven Years	1930	Hal Roach Studios	[title unknown] 1930 (French) [title unknown] 1930 (German); Los Pequeños Papas 1930 (Spanish)	Our Gang shorts.
The Flame of Love	1930	BIP	Hai-Tang. Der Weg zur Schande 1930 (German); Hai-Tang 1930 (French)	
For Her Sake (Swedish: För hennes skull)	1930	Minerva	Mach' mir die Welt zum Paradies 1930 (German)	
Free and Easy	1930	MGM	Estrellados 1930 (Spanish)	Both star Buster Keaton.
Girl Shock	1930	Hal Roach Studios	Timide Malgré Lui 1930 (French) ¡Huye, Faldas! 1930 (Spanish)	
Going Wild	1930	First National	L'aviateur 1931 (French)	
Grumpy	1930	Paramount	Cascarrabias 1930 (Spanish)	
Hans in Every Street (German: Hans in allen Gassen)	1930	Carl Froelich-Film/Films P.J. de Venloo	La folle aventure 1931 (French)	
Her Wedding Night	1930	Paramount	Su noche de bodas 1931 (Spanish); Marions-nous 1931 (French); Ich heirate meinen Mann 1931 (German); A Minha Noite de Núpcias 1931 (Portuguese)	
Hog Wild	1930	Hal Roach Studios	Pêle-mêle 1930 (French); Radiomanía 1930 (Spanish)	All star Laurel and Hardy.
Hokuspokus (German)	1930	UFA	The Temporary Widow 1930 (English)	
A Hole in the Wall (French: Un trou dans le mur)	1930	Paramount	Un hombre de suerte 1930 (Spanish); När rosorna slå ut 1930 (Swedish)	
Honey	1930	Paramount	Salga de la cocina 1930 (Spanish); Chérie 1931 (French); Jede Frau hat etwas 1931 (German); Kärlek måste vi ha 1931 (Swedish)	
The House of the Arrow	1930	Julius Hagen/Jacques Haïk	La Maison de la Fléche 1930 (French)	
Imperial and Royal Field Marshal (Czech: C. a k. polní maršálek)	1930	Elektafilm/Ondra-Lamac/Prociné Standard	K. und K. Feldmarschall 1930 (German); Monsieur le maréchal 1931 (French)	
Když struny lkají (Czech)	1930	Elektafilm/Feher	Ihr Junge 1931 (German)	
The King	1930	Hal Roach Studios	Der König 1930 (German)	
The King of Paris (German: Der König von Paris)	1930	Greenbaum Film	Le roi de Paris 1930 (French)	
Kismet	1930	First National	Kismet 1931 (German)	
A Lady's Morals	1930	MGM	Jenny Lind 1931 (French)	
The Last Company (German: Die letzte Kompagnie)	1930	UFA	The Last Company 1930 (English)	
Laughter	1930	Paramount	Lo mejor es reir 1931 (Spanish); Rive gauche 1931 (French); Die Männer um Lucie 1931 (German); A Dama Que Ri 1931 (Portuguese)	
Let Us Be Gay	1930	MGM	Soyons gais 1930 (French)	
Lieutenant, Were You Once a Hussar? (German: Leutnant warst Du einst bei deinen Husaren)	1930	Aafa	Mon coeur incognito 1931 (French)	
Looser Than Loose	1930	Hal Roach Studios	Gare las Bomb! 1930 (French); Una Cana al Aire 1930 (Spanish)	
Manslaughter	1930	Paramount	La incorregible 1930 (Spanish); Le réquisitoire 1931 (French); Leichtsinnige Jugend 1931 (German); Lika inför lagen 1931 (Swedish)	
Men of the North	1930	MGM	Monsieur Le Fox 1931 (French); Monsieur Le Fox 1931 (German); Monsieur Le Fox 1931 (Spanish); Luigi La Volpe 1931 (Italian)	Co-directed by Hal Roach.
Min and Bill	1930	MGM	La fruta amarga 1930 (Spanish)	
Moby Dick	1930	Warner Bros.	Moby Dick 1931 (French); Dämon des Meeres 1931 (German)	
Murder!	1930	BIP	Mary 1931 (German)	Both are directed by Alfred Hitchcock.
Night Birds	1930	BIP/Richard Eichberg-Film GmbH	Der Greifer 1930 (German)	
Night Owls	1930	MGM	Ladrones 1930 (Spanish)	Both star Laurel and Hardy.
On Your Back	1930	Fox	Esclavas de la moda 1930 (Spanish)	
One Mad Kiss	1930	Fox	El precio de un beso 1930 (Spanish)	
The Other (German: Der Andere)	1930	Terra Film	Le procureur Hallers 1930 (French)	
Paramount on Parade	1930	Paramount	Galas de la Paramount 1930 (Spanish); Paramount en parade 1930 (French); Paramount auf Parade 1930 (German); Paramount sulla parata 1930 (Italian); Paramount on Parade 1931 (Swedish); Paramount op parade 1930 (Dutch); Parada Paramount 1930 (Romanian); Paramount on Parade 1930 (Japanese); Paramount on Parade 1930 (Czech); Paramount on Parade 1930 (Hungarian); Paramount on Parade 1930 (Serbian); Parada Paramountu 1930 (Polish)	
Playboy of Paris	1930	Paramount	Le petit café 1931 (French)	
Rendezvous (German: Komm' zu mir zum Rendezvous)	1930	Cinaes/Harmonie/Braunberger-Richebé/Renacimiento	El amor solfeando 1930 (Spanish); L'amour chante 1930 (French)	
Sarah and Son	1930	Paramount	Toda una vida 1930 (Spanish); Toute sa vie 1930 (French); Il richiamo del cuore 1930 (Italian); Hjärtats röst 1931 (Swedish); A Canção do Berço 1930 (Portuguese); Glos serca 1930 (Polish)	
Scotland Yard	1930	Fox	El impostor 1930 (Spanish)	
The Sea God	1930	MGM	El Dios del mar 1930 (Spanish)	
Show Girl in Hollywood	1930	First National	Le masque d'Hollywood 1930 (French)	
The Shrimp	1930	Hal Roach Studios	¡Pobre infeliz! (Spanish)	
The Singing City (German: Die singende Stadt)	1930	Allianz Tonfilm	City of Song 1931 (English)	
Slightly Scarlet	1930	Paramount	Amor audaz 1930 (Spanish); L'énigmatique Monsieur Parkes 1930 (French)	
The Song Is Ended (German: Das Lied ist aus)	1930	Super	Petit officier… Adieu! 1930 (French)	
The Song of Love (Italian: La canzone dell'amore)	1930	Cines	Liebeslied 1931 (German); La dernière berceuse 1931 (French)	
The Son of the White Mountain (German: Der Sohn der weißen Berge)	1930	Itala/Gaumont	Les chevaliers de la montagne 1930 (French)	
La straniera (Italian)	1930	Jean de la Cour/Hegewald	L'étrangère 1931 (French); Die Fremde 1931 (German)	
La tendresse (French)	1930	André Hugon/Pathé-Natan	Zärtlichkeit 1930 (German)	
Those Who Dance	1930	Warner Bros.	Los que danzan 1930 (Spanish); Contre-enquête 1931 (French); Der Tanz geht weiter 1931 (German)	
The Three from the Filling Station (German: Die Drei von der Tankstelle)	1930	UFA	Le chemin du paradis 1930 (French)	
A Tough Winter	1930	Hal Roach Studios	Temps d'Hiver 1930 (French); Winter Wetter 1930 (German) [title unknown] 1930 (Spanish)	Our Gang shorts.
The Virtuous Sin	1930	Paramount	Generalen 1931 (Swedish); Le Rebelle 1931 (French); Die Nacht der Entscheidung 1931 (German)	
Two Worlds	1930	BIP	Zwei Welten 1930 (German); Les deux mondes 1930 (French)	
Waltz of Love (German: Liebeswalzer)	1930	UFA	The Love Waltz 1930 (English)	
Way for a Sailor	1930	MGM	En cada puerto un amor 1931 (Spanish)	
The Way of All Men	1930	First National	Die Maske fällt 1931 (German)	
What a Man	1930	Sono Art	Así es la vida 1930 (Spanish)	
When the Wind Blows	1930	Hal Roach Studios	[title unknown] 1930 (French) [title unknown] 1930 (German); Las Fantasmas 1930 (Spanish)	Our Gang shorts.
77 Park Lane	1931	Famous Players Guild	77 Rue Chalgrin 1931 (French); Entre noche y día 1932 (Spanish)	
Aféra plukovníka Redla (Czech)	1931	Elektafilm/Sonor	Der Fall des Generalstabs-Oberst Redl 1931 (German)	
The Lovers of Midnight (French: Les amours de minuit)	1931	Carl Froelich/Braunberger-Richebé	Mitternachtsliebe 1931 (German)	
Arabian Nights	1931	Universal	El Tenorio del harem 1931 (Spanish)	
Ariane (German)	1931	UFA	The Loves of Ariane 1931 (English); Ariane, jeune fille russe 1932 (French)	
The Bachelor Father	1931	MGM	Le père célibataire 1931 (French)	
Bad Girl	1931	Fox	Marido y mujer 1931 (Spanish)	
The Ball (French: Le Bal)	1931	Les Films Marcel Vandal et Charles Delac	Der Ball 1931 (German)	
Be Big! and Laughing Gravy	Both 1931	Hal Roach Studios	Les Carottiers 1931 (French); 1931 (Spanish)	All star Laurel and Hardy. Plots and footage from the English shorts were combined into much longer foreign ones.
The Beggar Student (German: Der Bettelstudent)	1931	Aafa-Film/Amalgamated Films	The Beggar Student 1931 (English remake)	
Black Coffee	1931	Julius Hagen/Jacques Haïk	Le coffret de laque 1932 (French)	
Body and Soul	1931	Fox	Cuerpo y alma 1931 (Spanish)	
Bombs on Monte Carlo (German: Bomben auf Monte Carlo)	1931	UFA	Le capitaine Craddock 1931 (French); Monte Carlo Madness 1932 (English)	
Business Under Distress (Czech: To neznáte Hadimršku)	1931	Elektafilm/Ondra-Lamac	Wehe, wenn er losgelassen 1932 (German)	
Cape Forlorn	1931	BIP	Menschen im Käfig 1930 (German); Le cap perdu 1931 (French)	
Charlie Chan Carries On	1931	Fox	Eran trece 1931 (Spanish)	
The Charm of Seville (Spanish: El embrujo de Sevilla)	1931	Braunberger-Richebé/Tobis/Julio César	L'Ensorcellement de Séville 1931 (French)	
Chickens Come Home	1931	Hal Roach Studios	Politiquerías 1931 (Spanish)	Both star Laurel and Hardy.
The Congress Dances (German: Der Kongreß tanzt)	1931	UFA	Le congrès s'amuse 1931 (French); Congress Dances 1932 (English)	
The Criminal Code	1931	Columbia	El código penal 1931 (Spanish); Criminel 1933 (French)	
Don't Bet on Women	1931	Fox	Conoces a tu mujer? 1931 (Spanish)	
Dracula	1931	Universal	Drácula 1931 (Spanish)	
The Eaglet (French: L'aiglon)	1931	Les Films Osso	Der Herzog von Reichstadt 1931 (German)	
The Easiest Way	1931	MGM	Quand on est belle 1931 (French)	
False Millionaire (Swedish: Falska millionären)	1931	Minerva/Jacques Haïk	Mon coeur et ses millions 1931 (French)	
La Femme d'une nuit (French)	1931	Braunberger-Richebé	Königin einer Nacht 1931 (German); La donna di una notte 1931 (Italian)	
La femme et le rossignol (French)	1931	André Hugon/Union	Die Frau - Die Nachtigall 1931 (German)	
Die Fledermaus (German)	1931	Ondra-Lamac/Vandor	La chauve-souris 1932 (French)	
Fra Diavolo (German)	1931	Itala	Fra Diavolo 1931 (French)	
Einer Frau muß man alles verzeih'n (German)	1931	Nowik & Roell/Societé Internationale Cinématographique	Durand contre Durand 1931 (French)	
Gloria (German)	1931	Matador/Pathé-Natan	Gloria 1931 (French)	
The Good Bad Girl	1931	Columbia	El pasado acusa 1931 (Spanish)	
Grock (German)	1931	Sofar/Cinema	Grock 1931 (French)	
Her Grace Commands (German: Ihre Hoheit befiehlt)	1931	UFA	Princesse, à vos ordres! 1931 (French)	
Her Majesty the Barmaid (German: Ihre Majestät die Liebe)	1931	DLS/May-Film	Son altesse l'amour 1931 (French)	
Him and His Sister (Czech: On a jeho sestra)	1931	Elektafilm/Tobis	Er und seine Schwester 1931 (German)	
Hyppolit, the Butler (Hungarian: Hyppolit, a lakáj)	1931	Sonor	Er und sein Diener 1931 (German)	
I Go Out and You Stay Here (German: Ich geh' aus und Du bleibst da)	1931	Cicero	L'inconstante. Je sors et tu restes là 1931 (French)	
Inquest (German: Voruntersuchung)	1931	UFA	Autour d'une enquête 1931 (French)	
It Pays to Advertise	1931	Paramount	Criez-le sur les toits 1932 (French)	
The Lady Who Dared	1931	First National	La dama atrevida 1931 (Spanish)	
Let's Love and Laugh	1931	BIP	Die Bräutigamswitwe 1931 (German)	
The Little Escapade (German: Der kleine Seitensprung)	1931	UFA	Le petit écart 1931 (French)	
Local Boy Makes Good	1931	First National	L'athlète incomplet 1932 (French)	
The Love Express (German: Der Liebesexpreß)	1931	Greenbaum Film/Emelka	Nuits de Venise 1931 (French)	
M aka M - Eine Stadt sucht einen Mörder (English: M - A City Looks for a Murderer)	1931	Nero-Film AG	M 1932 (English); M - le Maudit 1932 (French)	
Mam'zelle Nitouche (French)	1931	Ondra-Lamac/Vandor	Mamsell Nitouche 1932 (German)	
The Man Who Came Back	1931	Fox	Del infierno al cielo 1931 (Spanish)	
The Man with the Claw (Italian: L'uomo dall'artiglio)	1931	Cines/Orplid	Die Pranke 1931 (German)	
Marius (French)	1931	Paramount	Zum goldenen Anker 1932 (German); Längtan till havet 1931 (Swedish)	
Madame Pompadour (German: Die Marquise von Pompadour)	1931	DLS/Ellen Richter/Jacques Haïk	Un caprice de la Pompadour 1931 (French)	
Men in Her Life	1931	Fox	Hombres en mi vida 1931 (Spanish)	
Moon Over Morocco (French: Les cinq gentlemen maudits)	1931	Les Films Marcel Vandal	Die fünf verfluchten Gentlemen 1932 (German)	
Moritz Makes His Fortune (German: Moritz macht sein Glück)	1931	André Hugon/Pathé-Natan	Les galeries Lévy et Cie 1932 (French)	
Mountains on Fire (German: Berge in Flammen)	1931	Les Films Marcel Vandal et Charles Delac	Les monts en flammes 1931 (French); Doomed Battalion 1932 (English remake)	
The Murderer Dimitri Karamazov (German: Der Mörder Dimitri Karamasoff)	1931	Terra/Pathé-Natan	Les frères Karamazoff 1932 (French)	
My Cousin from Warsaw (German: Meine Cousine aus Warschau)	1931	Allianz Tonfilm/Les Films Osso	Ma cousine de Varsovie 1931 (French)	
My Wife, the Impostor (German: Meine Frau, die Hochstaplerin)	1931	UFA	Ma femme... homme d'affaires 1932 (French)	
A Night at the Grand Hotel (German: Eine Nacht im Grandhotel)	1931	Thalia/Nero/Pathé	La Femme de mes rêves 1932 (French)	
En natt (Swedish)	1931	Jacques Haïk/SF	Serments 1931 (French)	
No More Love (German: Nie wieder Liebe!)	1931	UFA	Calais-Dover 1931 (French)	
Pardon Us	1931	Hal Roach Studio	De Bote en Bote Sous les verrous 1931 (French); Hinter Schloss und Riegel 1931 (German); 1931 (Spanish); Muraglie 1931 (Italian)	All star Laurel and Hardy.
Parlor, Bedroom and Bath	1931	MGM	Buster se marie 1931 (French); Casanova wider Willen 1931 (German)	All star Buster Keaton.
The Phantom of Paris	1931	MGM	Cheri-Bibi 1931 (Spanish)	
The Pip From Pittsburgh	1931	Hal Roach Studios	La Senorita de Chicago 1931 (Spanish)	
The Private Secretary (German: Die Privatsekretärin)	1931	Greenbaum Film	Dactylo 1931 (French); Sunshine Susie 1931 (English remake); La segretaria private 1931 (Italian remake)	
Resurrection	1931	Universal	Resurrección 1931 (Spanish)	
Ronny (German)	1931	UFA	Ronny 1931 (French)	
Rough Seas	1931	MGM	Monerías 1931 (Spanish)	
The Royal Bed	1931	RKO	Échec au roi 1931 (French)	
Salto Mortale (German)	1931	Harmonie-Film GmbH	Salto Mortale 1931 (French)	
Shadows of the Underworld (German: Schatten der Unterwelt)	1931	Ariel	Ombres des bas fonds 1931 (French)	
De Sensatie van de Toekomst (Dutch)	1931	Paramount	Magie moderne 1931 (French); Televisione 1931 (Italian); Trådlöst och kärleksfullt 1931 (Swedish); Svet bez hranic 1931 (Czech); Swiat bez granic 1931 (Polish); Televiziune 1931 (Romanian)	
The Song of the Nations (German: Das Lied der Nationen)	1931	Union/Apollon	La Chanson des nations 1931 (French)	
Stamboul	1931	Paramount	El hombre que asesinó 1932 (Spanish); L'homme qui assassina 1931 (French); Der Mann, der den Mord beging 1931 (German)	
The Street Song (German: Gassenhauer)	1931	Deutsches Lichtspiel-Syndikat	Les quatre vagabonds 1931 (French)	
Ten Cents a Dance	1931	Columbia	Carne de cabaret 1931 (Spanish)	
Their Mad Moment	1931	Fox	Mi último amor 1931 (Spanish)	
The Threepenny Opera (German: Die Dreigroschenoper)	1931	Nero-Film AG/Tobis Filmkunst/Warner Bros.	L'opéra de quat'sous 1931 (French)	
Thundering Tenors	1931	MGM	El alma de la fiesta 1931 (Spanish)	
Transgression	1931	RKO	Nuit d'Espagne 1931 (French)	
Trötte Teodor (Swedish)	1931	Minerva/Jacques Haïk	Service de nuit 1932 (French)	
The Viking	1931	J.D. Williams/Newfoundland-Labrador Film Company	Ceux du viking 1932 (French)	
When Do You Commit Suicide? (French: Quand te tues-tu?)	1931	Paramount	¿Cuándo te suicidas? 1932 (Spanish)	
The Woman Between	1931	RKO	Le fils de l'autre 1931 (French)	
Alias the Doctor	1932	First National	Le cas du docteur Brenner 1933 (French)	
Atlantis (French: L'Atlantide)	1932	Nero-Film AG/Societé Internationale Cinématographique	Die Herrin von Atlantis 1932 (German); The Mistress of Atlantis 1932 (English)	
Baby (German)	1932	Ondra-Lamac/Vandor	Baby 1933 (French)	
Bachelor Mother	1932	Goldsmith Productions	Tres Amores 1934 (Spanish)	
The Beautiful Adventure (German: Das schöne Abenteuer)	1932	UFA	La belle aventure 1932 (French)	
A Blonde Dream (German: Ein blonder Traum)	1932	UFA	Happy Ever After 1932 (English); Un rêve blond 1932 (French)	
The Blue Danube	1932	Herbert Wilcox Productions	Le Danube Bleu 1932 (French)	
The Cheeky Devil (German: Der Frechdachs)	1932	UFA	Vous serez ma femme 1932 (French)	
The Crowd Roars	1932	Warner Bros.	La foule hurle 1932 (French)	
Le dernier choc (French)	1932	Les Films Osso	Niebla 1932 (Spanish)	
Dreaming Lips (German: Der träumende Mund)	1932	Matador/Pathé-Natan	Mélo 1932 (French)	
Flying Gold (Hungarian: Repülő arany)	1932	Les Films Osso	Rouletabille aviateur 1932 (French)	
F.P.1 does not reply (German: F.P.1 antwortet nicht)	1932	UFA	I.F.1 ne répond plus 1932 (French); F.P.1 1932 (English)	
Girls to Marry (German: Mädchen zum Heiraten)	1932	Fellner & Somio/Gainsborough	Marry Me 1932 (English)	
The Cruel Mistress (German: Die grausame Freundin)	1932	Ondra-Lamac/Lothar Stark/Les Films Osso	Faut-il les marier? 1932 (French)	
Großstadtnacht (German)	1932	Terra/Pathé-Natan	Mirages de Paris 1933 (French)	
Gypsies of the Night (German: Zigeuner der Nacht)	1932	H.M.-Film/Pathé-Natan	Coeurs joyeux 1932 (French)	
Haunted People (German: Gehetzte Menschen)	1932	Emco	Štvaní lidé 1933 (Czech)	
He Is Charming (French: Il est charmant)	1932	Paramount	Studenter i Paris 1932 (Swedish)	
High Pressure	1932	Warner Bros.	Le bluffeur 1932 (French)	
I by Day, You by Night (German: Ich bei Tag und du bei Nacht)	1932	UFA	À moi le jour, à toi la nuit 1932 (French); Early to Bed 1932 (English)	
The Ideal Schoolmaster (Czech: Kantor ideál)	1932	Elektafilm/Vladimír Kabelík/Moldavia	Professeur Cupidon 1933 (French)	
Kiki (German)	1932	Ondra-Lamac/Vandor	Kiki 1933 (French)	
King of the Hotel (French: Le roi des palaces)	1932	Gaumont/Gainsborough/British Lion	King of the Ritz 1933 (English)	
Lelíček ve službách Sherlocka Holmese (Czech)	1932	Elektafilm	Le roi bis 1932 (French)	
The Love Contract	1932	British & Dominions Film Corporation/Gaumont/Excelsior	Chauffeur Antoinette 1932 (German); Conduisez-moi, Madame 1932 (French)	
A Mad Idea (German: Ein toller Einfall)	1932	UFA/Via	Une idée folle 1933 (French)	
Madame Makes Her Exit (German: Madame hat Ausgang)	1932	Tobis/Vandal/Delac	L'amoureuse aventure 1932 (French)	
Man Without a Name (German: Mensch ohne Namen)	1932	UFA	Un homme sans nom 1932 (French)	
Money for Nothing	1932	BIP/Jacques Haïk	L'amour et la veine 1932 (French)	
Monsieur, Madame and Bibi (French: Monsieur, Madame et Bibi)	1932	Pathé-Natan/H.M.-Film	Ein bißchen Liebe für dich 1932 (German); Due cuori felici 1932 (Italian remake); Yes, Mr Brown 1933 (English remake)	
A Night in Paradise (German: Eine Nacht im Paradies)	1932	Lothar Stark/Ondra-Lamac/Vandor	Une nuit au paradis 1932 (French)	
The Old Scoundrel (Hungarian: A vén gazember)	1932	Hunnia/UFA	...und es leuchtet die Puszta 1933 (German)	
Once There Was a Waltz (German: Es war einmal ein Walzer)	1932	Aafa-Film/Amalgamated Films	Where Is This Lady? 1932 (English)	
One Hour with You	1932	Paramount	Une heure près de toi 1932 (French)	
One Night with You (Italian: Una notte con te)	1932	Tofa/Itala	Kleines Mädel - großes Glück 1933 (German)	
Paprika (German)	1932	Victor Klein/Italfono/S.A.P.F./Romain Pinès	Paprika 1933 (Italian); Paprika 1933 (French)	
The Passionate Plumber	1932	MGM	Le plombier amoureux 1932 (French)	Both star Buster Keaton.
Pergolesi (Italian)	1932	Cines	Les amours de Pergolèse 1933 (French)	
Une petite femme dans le train (French)	1932	Paramount/AB	Jsem děvče s čertem v těle 1933 (Czech)	
Quick (German)	1932	UFA	Quick 1932 (French)	
The Rebel (German: Der Rebell)	1932	Deutsche Universal	The Rebel 1933 (English)	
Scampolo (German)	1932	Lothar Stark	Un peu d'amour 1932 (French)	
Sehnsucht 202 (German)	1932	Cine-Allianz/Les Films Osso	Une jeune fille et un million 1932 (French)	
Sergeant X (German)	1932	Gloria	Le sergent X 1932 (French)	
Service for Ladies	1932	Paramount	Monsieur Albert 1932 (French)	
A Shot at Dawn (German: Schuß im Morgengrauen)	1932	UFA	Coup de feu à l'aube 1932 (French)	
The Song of Night (German: Das Lied einer Nacht)	1932	Cine-Allianz/Gainsborough	Tell Me Tonight 1932 (English); La chanson d'une nuit 1933 (French)	
Spoiling the Game (German: Strich durch die Rechnung)	1932	UFA	Rivaux de la piste 1933 (French)	
Spring Shower (Hungarian: Tavaszi zápor)	1932	Les Films Osso	Prima dragoste 1932 (Romanian); Marie, légende hongroise 1933 (French)	
Storms of Passion (German: Stürme der Leidenschaft)	1932	UFA	Tumultes 1932 (French)	
Three on a Honeymoon (German: Hochzeitsreise zu Dritt)	1932	Mondial/Romain Pinès/S.I.C.	Voyage de noces 1933 (French)	
Two Hearts Beat as One (German: Zwei Herzen und ein Schlag)	1932	UFA	La fille et le garçon 1932 (French)	
Two in a Car (German: Zwei in einem Auto)	1932	May-Film/Pathé-Natan	Paris-Méditerranée 1932 (French)	
The Victor (German: Der Sieger)	1932	UFA	Le vainqueur 1932 (French)	
Die Vier vom Bob 13 (German)	1932	Gnom/Equitable	L'amour en vitesse 1932 (French)	
The White Demon (German: Der weiße Dämon)	1932	UFA	Stupéfiants 1932 (French)	
Wrong Number, Miss (German: Fräulein - Falsch verbunden)	1932	Itala/Cines	La telefonista 1932 (Italian remake)	
Adventures on the Lido (German: Abenteuer am Lido)	1933	Pan-Film KG Wien	Le chant du destin 1933 (French)	
And Who Is Kissing Me? (German: ...und wer küßt mich?)	1933	Itala/Consorzio Persic	La ragazza dal livido azzurro 1933 (Italian)	
The Big Bluff (German: Der große Bluff)	1933	T.K. Tonfilm/Tobis/Gaumont-Franco-Film-Aubert	Le grand bluff 1933 (French)	
The Castle in the South (German: Das Schloß im Süden)	1933	Boston/UFA	Château de rêve 1933 (French)	
Daughter of the Regiment (German: Die Tochter des Regiments)	1933	Ondra-Lamac/Vandor	La fille du régiment 1933 (French)	
Des jungen Dessauers große Liebe (German)	1933	UFA/ACE	Tambour battant 1934 (French)	
Diagnosa X (Czech)	1933	DAFA	Um ein bisschen Glück 1934 (German)	
Don Quixote (French: Don Quichotte)	1933	Nelson Film/Vandor Film	Don Quichotte 1933 (German); Adventures of Don Quixote 1933 (English)	
The Empress and I (German: Ich und die Kaiserin)	1933	UFA/Gainsborough	Moi et l'Impératrice 1933 (French); The Only Girl 1934 (English)	
Flirtation (German: Liebelei)	1933	Allianz Tonfilm	Une histoire d'amour 1933 (French)	
Gently My Songs Entreat (German: Leise flehen meine Lieder)	1933	Allianz Tonfilm	Unfinished Symphony 1934 (English)	
Ein gewisser Herr Gran (German)	1933	UFA	Un certain monsieur Grant 1933 (French)	
Es war einmal ein Musikus (German)	1933	Friedrich Zelnick-Film/Compagnie Cinematographique Continentale/Olympic Films	C'était un musicien 1934 (French)	
The Girl from Maxim's	1933	London Film	La dame de chez Maxim's 1933 (French)	
The Happiness of Grinzing (German)	1933	Oka	In the Little House Below Emauzy 1933 (Czech)	
Happy Days in Aranjuez (German: Die schönen Tage von Aranjuez)	1933	UFA/ACE	Adieu les beaux jours 1933 (French)	
His Majesty's Adjutant (German: Der Adjutant seiner Hoheit)	1933	Meissner	Pobočník Jeho Výsosti 1933 (Czech)	
Ich will Dich Liebe lehren (German)	1933	Pax	L'homme qui ne sait pas dire non (French)	
Ihre Durchlaucht, die Verkäuferin (German)	1933	UFA/Cine-Allianz/ACE	Caprice de princesse 1934 (French)	
It's Great to Be Alive	1933	Fox	El último varon sobre la Tierra 1933 (Spanish)	
Kísértetek vonata (Hungarian)	1933	City Film Rt./Hunnia Filmgyár	Trenul fantoma 1933 (Romanian)	
Life Is a Dog (Czech: Život je pes)	1933	Itala/Moldavia	Der Doppelbräutigam 1934 (German); Le Mari rêvé 1936 (French remake)	
The Lucky Diamond (Italian: Lisetta)	1933	Itala/Rex	Das Blumenmädchen vom Grand-Hotel 1934 (German)	
Madame Wants No Children (German: Madame wünscht keine Kinder)	1933	Lothar Stark/Vandor	Madame ne veut pas d'enfants 1933 (French)	
Marion, That's Not Nice (German: Marion, das gehört sich nicht)	1933	Itala	Cercasi modella 1933 (Italian)	
The Merry Monarch	1933	Tobis/Algra/S.E.P.I.C.	Die Abenteuer des Königs Pausole 1933 (German); Les aventures du roi Pausole 1933 (French)	
Money Talks	1933	BIP	L'argent par les fenêtres 1933 (French)	
The Oil Sharks (French: Les requins du pétrole)	1933	Pan/Sascha/Robert Müller	Unsichtbare Gegner 1933 (German)	
Pleasure Cruise	1933	Fox	No dejes la puerta abierta 1933 (Spanish)	
The Rakoczi March (German: Rakoczy-Marsch)	1933	City/Hunnia/Mondial/Märkische Film GmbH	Rákóczi induló 1933 (Hungarian)	
Refugees (German: Flüchtlinge)	1933	UFA	Au bout du monde 1934 (French)	
Revenge at Monte Carlo	1933	Mayfair Pictures Corporation	Dos noches 1933 (Spanish)	
S.O.S. Eisberg (German)	1933	Universal	S.O.S. Iceberg 1933 (English)	
Scandal in Budapest (German: Skandal in Budapest)	1933	Hunnia/Deutsche Universal	Pardon, tévedtem 1933 (Hungarian)	
Season in Cairo (German: Saison in Kairo)	1933	UFA	Idylle au Caire 1933 (French)	
A Song for You (German: Ein Lied für dich)	1933	UFA/Cine-Allianz/Gaumont	Tout pour l'amour 1933 (French); My Song for You 1934 (English)	
A Song Goes Round the World (German: Ein Lied geht um die Welt)	1933	Rio-Film GmbH	My Song Goes Round the World 1934 (English)	
The Song of the Sun (Italian: La canzone del sole)	1933	Itala/Capitani	Das Lied der Sonne 1933 (German)	
Sonnenstrahl (German)	1933	Tobis-Sascha/Vandor	Gardez le sourire 1933 (French)	
The Star of Valencia (German: Der Stern von Valencia)	1933	UFA/ACE	L'Étoile de Valencia 1933 (French)	
The Testament of Dr. Mabuse (German: Das Testament des Dr. Mabuse)	1933	Nero-Film AG	Le testament du Dr. Mabuse 1933 (French)	
A Thousand for One Night (German: Tausend für eine Nacht)	1933	Avanti/UFA/Wolfram	Tisíc za jednu noc 1933 (Czech)	
Il trattato scomparso (Italian)	1933	Bonnard Film	Le masque qui tombe 1933 (French)	
The Tsarevich (German: Der Zarewitsch)	1933	Prima/UFA/ACE	Son Altesse Impériale 1933 (French)	
The Tunnel (German: Der Tunnel)	1933	Bavaria Film/Vandor Film	Le Tunnel 1933 (French); The Tunnel 1935 (English remake)	
Die Unschuld vom Lande (German)	1933	Aco/Persin-Italfilm	La provincialina 1934 (Italian)	
The Verdict of Lake Balaton (Hungarian: Ítél a Balaton)	1933	Hunnia/Les Films Osso	Tempêtes 1933 (French); Menschen im Sturm 1933 (German); The Verdict of Lake Balaton 1933 (English)	
Victor and Victoria (German: Viktor und Viktoria)	1933	UFA	Georges et Georgette 1934 (French)	
Waltz War (German: Walzerkrieg)	1933	UFA/ACE	La guerre des valses 1933 (French)	
Was wissen denn Männer (German)	1933	UFA/Svensk Filmindustri	Vad veta väl männen? 1933 (Swedish)	
The Way to Love	1933	Paramount	L'amour guide 1933 (French)	
Wege zur guten Ehe (German)	1933	Gnom/Vandor	L'amour qu'il faut aux femmes 1934 (French)	
Annette in Paradise (German: Annette im Paradies)	1934	Wolfram-Film/Georg Witt	Anita v ráji 1934 (Czech)	
The Battle (French: La Bataille)	1934	Bernard Natan/Liano Films	The Battle 1934 (English)	
Caravan	1934	Fox	Caravane 1934 (French)	
Count Woronzeff (German: Fürst Woronzeff)	1934	UFA	Le secret des Woronzeff 1935 (French)	
The Csardas Princess (German: Die Czardasfürstin)	1934	UFA	Princesse Czardas 1934 (French)	
Decoy (German: Lockvogel)	1934	UFA/ACE	Le miroir aux alouettes 1935 (French)	
Ende schlecht, alles gut (German)	1934	City Film/Thalia-Film	Helyet az öregeknek 1934 (Hungarian)	
The Eternal Dream (German: Der ewige Traum)	1934	Cine-Allianz	Rêve éternel 1935 (French)	
Farewell Waltz (German: Abschiedswalzer)	1934	Boston/Tobis	La chanson de l'adieu 1934 (French)	
Gold (German)	1934	UFA	L'Or 1934 (French)	
Ich kenn' dich nicht und liebe dich (German)	1934	Boston/Tobis	Toi que j'adore 1934 (French)	
The Island (German: Die Insel)	1934	UFA/ACE	Vers l'abîme 1934 (French)	
Just Once a Great Lady (German: Einmal eine große Dame sein)	1934	UFA	Un jour viendra 1934 (French)	
Love, Death and the Devil (German: Liebe, Tod und Teufel)	1934	UFA/ACE	Le diable en bouteille 1935 (French)	
The Merry Widow	1934	MGM	La veuve joyeuse 1934 (French)	
My Heart Calls You (German: Mein Herz ruft nach dir)	1934	Cine-Allianz/Gaumont	Mon cœur t'appelle 1934 (French); My Heart Is Calling 1935 (English)	
A Night in Venice (Hungarian: Egy éj Velencében)	1934	Hunnia Film	Eine Nacht in Venedig 1934 (German)	
Polish Blood (German: Polenblut)	1934	Elektafilm/Ondra-Lamac	Polská krev 1934 (Czech)	
Princess Turandot (German: Prinzessin Turandot)	1934	UFA	Turandot, princesse de Chine 1935 (French)	
Pursued	1934	Fox	Nada más que una mujer 1934 (Spanish)	
Tatranská romance (Czech)	1934		Tatra-Romanze 1934 (German)	
Temptation	1934	Milo/Gaumont	Antonia, romance hongroise 1935 (French)	
Die vertauschte Braut (German)	1934	Ondra-Lamac/S.I.C./Sol	L'amour en cage 1934 (French)	
The Wedding March (Italian: La marcia nuziale)	1934	Manderfilm/Paris-Rome Films	La marche nuptiale 1935 (French)	
Weiße Majestät (German)	1934	Bavaria/Giovanni Seyta/Gefi	Un de la montagne 1934 (French)	
William Tell (German: Wilhelm Tell)	1934	Terra/Schweizer Film-Finanzierungs AG	William Tell 1934 (English)	
A Woman Who Knows What She Wants (Czech: Žena, která ví co chce)	1934	Slovia/Meissner	Eine Frau, die weiß, was sie will 1934 (German)	
The Young Baron Neuhaus (German: Der junge Baron Neuhaus)	1934	UFA/ACE	Nuit de mai 1934 (French)	
The Affairs of Maupassant (German: Tagebuch der Geliebten)	1935	Panta/Melodia/Astra	Il diario di una donna amata 1935 (Italian)	
Amphitryon (German)	1935	UFA	Les dieux s'amusent 1935 (French)	
April, April! (German)	1935	UFA	't Was één April 1936 (Dutch)	
Barcarole (German)	1935	UFA/ACE	Barcarolle 1935 (French)	
Black Roses (German: Schwarze Rosen)	1935	UFA	Roses noires 1935 (French); Black Roses 1936 (English)	
Campo di maggio (Italian)	1935	Consorzio Vis/Tirrenia/Forzano	Hundert Tage 1935 (German)	
Carnival in Flanders (French: La Kermesse héroïque)	1935	Tobis	Die klugen Frauen 1936 (German)	
Casta Diva (Italian)	1935	A.C.I.	The Divine Spark 1935 (English)	
Csardas (German)	1935	Terra	Rozpustilá noc 1935 (Czech)	
El diablo del mar (Spanish)	1935	Theater Classics/Excelsior	Devil Monster 1936 (English)	
Fietje Peters, Poste Restante (Dutch)	1935	R.N.-Filmproduktion/UFA	Hilde Petersen postlagernd 1936 (German)	
Fiordalisi d'oro (Italian)	1935	Forzano/Renaissance	Sous la terreur 1936 (French)	
Folies Bergère de Paris	1935	Fox	L'homme des Folies Bergère 1935 (French)	
Fresh Wind from Canada (German: Frischer Wind aus Kanada)	1935	UFA/ACE	Jonny, haute-couture 1935 (French)	
The Green Domino (French: Le domino vert)	1935	UFA	Der grüne Domino 1935 (German)	
The Gypsy Baron (German: Der Zigeunerbaron)	1935	UFA	Le baron tzigane 1935 (French)	
Her Highness Dances the Waltz (German: Hoheit tanzt Walzer)	1935	Elektafilm	Tanecek panny márinky 1935 (Czech); Valse éternelle 1936 (French)	
Hrdina jedné noci (Czech)	1935	Meissner	Held einer Nacht 1935 (German)	
I Like All the Women (German: Ich liebe alle Frauen)	1935	Allianz Tonfilm	J'aime toutes les femmes 1935 (French)	
Jana (Czech)	1935	Meissner	Jana, das Mädchen aus dem Böhmerwald 1935 (German)	
Koho jsem včera líbal? (Czech)	1935	Elka	Le coup de trois 1936 (French)	
Königswalzer (German)	1935	UFA/ACE	Valse royale 1936 (French)	
Light Cavalry (German: Leichte Kavallerie)	1935	UFA/F.D.F./ACE	Cavalerie légère 1935 (French)	
Make Me Happy (German: Mach' mich glücklich)	1935	UFA/ACE	Les époux célibataires 1935 (French)	
Midnight Phantom	1935	Reliable	El crimen de media noche 1936 (Spanish)	
One Too Many on Board (German: Einer zuviel an Bord)	1935	UFA/ACE	Un homme de trop à bord 1935 (French)	
Polibek ve sněhu (Czech)	1935	Alex	Liebe auf Bretteln 1935 (German)	
Quadrille d'amour (French)	1935	Societé Internationale Cinématographique	Die Katz' im Sack 1935 (German)	
Der Schlafwagenkontrolleur (German)	1935	Bavaria/Vandor	Le contrôleur des wagons-lits 1935 (French)	
Storm Over the Andes	1935	Universal	Alas sobre El Chaco 1935 (Spanish)	
Stradivari (German)	1935	Boston	Stradivarius 1935 (French)	
Varieté (German)	1935	Bavaria/Vandor	Variétés 1935 (French); Three Maxims 1936 (English remake)	
De Vier Mullers (Dutch)	1935	BMS	Alles für die Firma 1935 (German)	
Le voyage imprévu (French)	1935	Gegal Films/International Players	Runaway Ladies 1935 (English)	
Arme kleine Inge (German)	1936	Meissner/Metropolitan Film	Sextánka 1936 (Czech)	
Augustus the Strong (German: August der Starke)	1936	Nerthus Film/Polski Tobis	Unknown title (Polish), directed by Stanisław Wasylewski	
The Beloved Vagabond	1936	Toeplitz	Le vagabond bien-aimé 1936 (French)	
Captain Calamity	1936	Metropolitan Pictures/George A. Hirliman	El capitan Tormenta 1936 (Spanish)	
City of Anatol (German: Stadt Anatol)	1936	UFA	Puits en flammes 1937 (French)	
Coeur de gueux (French)	1936	Forzano/Renaissance	Cuor di vagabondo 1936 (Italian)	
Coup de vent (French)	1936	Lux/CFC/Forzano	Un colpo di vento 1936 (Italian)	
The Court Concert (German: Das Hofkonzert)	1936	UFA	La chanson du souvenir 1937 (French)	
The Devil on Horseback	1936	Metropolitan Pictures/George A. Hirliman	El carnaval del diablo 1936 (Spanish)	
Divoch (Czech)	1936	Meteor/Metropolitan Film	Rote Rosen - blaue Adria 1938 (German)	
Donogoo Tonka (German)	1936	UFA	Donogoo 1936 (French)	
Guilty Melody	1936	Franco London Films	Le disque 413 1936 (French)	
Half-Rate Honeymoon (Hungarian: Nászút féláron)	1936	Lux Film	Hochzeitsreise zu 50% 1937 (German)	
Heißes Blut (German)	1936	UFA	Les deux favoris 1936 (French)	
Irca's Romance (Czech: Irčin románek)	1936	Meissner/Metropolitan Film	Flucht an die Adria 1937 (German)	
The Last Waltz	1936	Warwick/Gnom	La dernière valse 1936 (French)	
Lucky Kids (German: Glückskinder)	1936	UFA	Les gais lurons 1936 (French)	
But It's Nothing Serious (Italian: Ma non è una cosa seria)	1936	Itala/Colombo	Der Mann, der nicht nein sagen kann 1938 (German)	
Martha (German)	1936	Lloyd Film	Martha 1936 (French)	
Michel Strogoff (French)	1936	Ermolieff/Richard Eichberg	Der Kurier des Zaren 1936 (German)	
Paradise Road (Czech: Ulička v ráji)	1936	Moldavia/Tobis	Das Gäßchen zum Paradies 1936 (German)	
La Vie parisienne	1936	Nero-Film	Parisian Life 1936 (English)	
Port-Arthur (French)	1936	F.C.L./Slavia	Port Arthur 1936 (German)	
Quand minuit sonnera (French)	1936	France-Europe Films	Klokslag Twaalf 1936 (Dutch)	
Skeppsbrutne Max (Swedish)	1936	M-film/Nationalfilm/Götafilm/Rudi Löwenthal	Rendezvous im Paradies 1936 (German)	
Tredici uomini e un cannone (Italian)	1936	Pisorno/Two Cities	13 Men and a Gun 1938 (English remake); Dreizehn Mann und eine Kanone 1938 (German remake)	
We're in the Legion Now!	1936	George A. Hirliman/Metropolitan Pictures	De la sartén al fuego 1936 (Spanish)	
A Woman Between Two Worlds (Italian: Una donna tra due mondi)	1936	Astra/Bavaria	Die Liebe des Maharadscha 1936 (German)	
A Woman of No Importance (German: Eine Frau ohne Bedeutung)	1936	Majestic/Régina	Une femme sans importance 1937 (French)	
Adventure in Warsaw (German: Abenteuer in Warschau)	1937	Nerthus/Polski Tobis	Dyplomatyczna żona 1937 (Polish)	
Cause for Divorce (German: Der Scheidungsgrund)	1937	Moldavia/Ondra-Lamac	Duvod k rozvodu 1937 (Czech)	
Condottieri (Italian)	1937	ENIC/Tobis	Condottieri 1937 (German)	
The Girl in the Taxi	1937	British Unity Pictures	La chaste Suzanne 1937 (French)	
The Man from Nowhere (French: L'homme de nulle part)	1937	Général Productions/Ala/Colosseum	Il fu Mattia Pascal 1937 (Italian)	
L'homme sans coeur (French)	1937	France-Europe Films	De Man Zonder Hart 1937 (Dutch)	
Poslíček lásky (Czech)	1937	Lord/Metropolitan/Lloydfilm	Not a Word About Love 1937 (German)	
Street of Shadows (French: Mademoiselle Docteur)	1937	Romain Pinès/Trocadero/Pathé/Grafton/Trafalgar	Under Secret Orders 1937 (English)	
The Three Wishes (Dutch: De drie wensen)	1937	Odeon/Manenti	I tre desideri 1937 (Italian)	
Woman of Malacca (French: La Dame de Malacca)	1937	Régina	Andere Welt 1937 (German)	
Addresse unbekannt (German)	1938	Kabelac	Ze vsech jediná 1938 (Czech)	
Bozí mlýny (Czech)	1938	Meissner	Die Gottes Mühlen 1938 (German)	
Dir gehört mein Herz (German)	1938	Itala/Tobis	Marionette 1939 (Italian)	
The Gambler (German: Der Spieler)	1938	Euphono/Kreutzberg/Tobis	Le joueur 1938 (French)	
Geld fällt vom Himmel (German)	1938	Nordland/Alba	Pengar från skyn 1938 (Swedish)	
Heiraten - aber wen? (German)	1938	Donau/Elektafilm	Falešná kocicka 1938 (Czech)	
Ihr Leibhusar (German)	1938	Eco/Hunnia/Pictura	A Noszty fiú esete Tóth Marival 1938 (Hungarian)	
The Indian Tomb (German: Das indische Grabmal)	1938	Richard Eichberg	Le tombeau hindou 1938 (French)	
Lidé pod horami (Czech)	1938	Wolfram	Menschen in den Bergen 1938 (German)	
The Mountain Calls (German: Der Berg ruft)	1938	Luis Trenker/London Film/Denham	The Challenge 1938 (English)	
Nights in Andalusia (German: Andalusische Nächte)	1938	Carl Froelich/Hispano	Carmen, la de Triana 1938 (Spanish)	
Nuits de princes (French)	1938	Ermolieff/Tobis	Ab Mitternacht 1938 (German)	
Panenka (Czech)	1938	Metropolitan Film	Robot-Girl Nr. 1 1938 (German)	
People Who Travel (German: Fahrendes Volk)	1938	Tobis	Les gens du voyage 1938 (French)	
Princess Tarakanova (French: Tarakanowa)	1938	Chronos/Nero/SAFI	La principessa Tarakanova 1938 (Italian)	
Prison Without Bars	1938	CIPRA/London Film	Prison sans barreaux 1938 (French)	
Roxy and the Wonderteam (German: Roxy und das Wunderteam)	1938	H.T. Film	3:1 a szerelem javára 1938 (Hungarian)	
The Tiger of Eschnapur (German: Der Tiger von Eschnapur)	1938	Richard Eichberg	Le tigre du Bengale 1938 (French)	
Unsere kleine Frau (German)	1938	Itala	Mia moglie si diverte 1938 (Italian)	
The Woman Thief (French: Le Voleur de femmes)	1938	Films Union/Pisorno	Ladro di donne 1938 (Italian)	
Casa lontana (Italian)	1939	Itala	Der singende Tor 1939 (German)	
Castles in the Air (Italian: Castelli in aria)	1939	Astra Film	Ins blaue Leben 1939 (German)	
Dernière jeunesse (French)	1939	Lumen Films/Scalera	Ultima giovinezza 1939 (Italian)	
Unknown of Monte Carlo (French: L'inconnue de Monte Carlo)	1939	Continentalcine/Franco London Films	La signora di Montecarlo 1939 (Italian)	
Menschen vom Varieté (German)	1939	Pictura/Hunnia	A varieté csillagai 1939 (Hungarian)	
Miracle on Main Street	1939	Grand National/Arcadia	El milagro de la calle mayor 1939 (Spanish)	
Il segreto inviolabile (Italian)	1939	Nembo Film	Su mayor aventura 1940 (Spanish)	
Terra di fuoco (Italian)	1939	Manenti	Terre de feu 1942 (French)	
Zwischen Strom und Steppe (German)	1939	Spectrum/Hunnia	Tiszavirág 1939 (Hungarian)	
The Bercsenyi Hussars (Hungarian)	1940	Magyar Film Iroda/Nuova	Il capitano degli ussari 1940 (Italian)	
Dopo divorzieremo (Italian)	1940	Excelsa	El marido provisional 1940 (Spanish)	
Ecco la felicità (Italian)	1940	Discina/Scalera/Societé Parisienne de Distribution Cinématographique	La Comédie du bonheur 1942 (French)	
Inspector Vargas (Italian: L'ispettore Vargas)	1940	Sovrania Film/I.C.A.R./CIFESA	El inspector Vargas 1947 (Spanish)	
Ritorno (Italian)	1940	Itala Film/Scalera Film	Traummusik 1940 (German)	
The Sin of Rogelia Sanchez (Italian: Il peccato di Rogelia Sanchez)	1940	SAFIC/Producciones Hispánicas	Santa Rogelia 1940 (Spanish)	
L'uomo della legione (Italian)	1940	Continentalcine/Duro	El hombre de la legión 1941 (Spanish)	
Capitan Tempesta (Italian)	1942	Scalera Film	El capitán Tormenta 1943 (Spanish)	
Dove andiamo, signora? (Italian)	1942	Styria/Elica/XX Secolo	Abenteuer im Grand Hotel 1943 (German)	
Giungla (Italian)	1942	SAFIC/ICI/F.D.F.	Vom Schicksal verweht 1942 (German)	
Il leone di Damasco (Italian)	1942	Scalera Film	El león de Damasco 1943 (Spanish)	
Much Ado About Nixi (German: Viel Lärm um Nixi)	1942	Klagemann/Amato	Non mi sposo più 1942 (Italian)	
Seven Years of Good Luck (German: Sieben Jahre Glück)	1942	Bavaria/Fono Roma	Sette anni di felicità 1943 (Italian)	
Cinco fueron escogidos (Spanish)	1943	Alpha Films	Five Were Chosen 1944 (English)	
Lascia cantare il cuore (Italian)	1943	Deka/Fono/UFA	...und die Musik spielt dazu 1943 (German)	
I pagliacci (Italian)	1943	Tobis/Itala	Lache Bajazzo 1943 (German)	
Cinco lobitos (Spanish)	1945	Faro/Filmes Lumiar	O Diabo São Elas 1945 (Portuguese)	
Barrio (Spanish)	1947	Faro/Doperfilme	Viela, rua sem sol 1947 (Portuguese)	
Whispering City (English)	1947	Québec Productions	La Forteresse 1947 (French)	Same director with different sets of actors
But Not in Vain	1948	Anglo-Dutch	Niet tevergeefs 1948 (Dutch)	
Le Dessous des cartes (French)	1948	Flaminia/Gladiator/Régina	Manù il contrabbandiere 1948 (Italian)	
Alarm Bells (Italian: Campane a martello)	1949	Lux/Ortus	Children of Chance 1949 (English)	
L'Inconnu d'un soir (French)	1949	Arta/Berna/Donau	Liebling der Welt 1949 (German)	
Orage d'été (French)	1949	Pathé/P.A.C.	Due sorelle amano 1950 (Italian)	
Singoalla (Swedish)	1949	Terrafilm	Singoalla 1950 (French); The Wind Is My Lover (English)	Scenes were recorded in Swedish, French and English.
The Glass Castle (French: Le Château de verre)	1950	Fortezza/Universalia/Franco London	L'amante di una notte 1950 (Italian)	
Gunman in the Streets	1950	Sacha Gordine/Victor Pahlen	Le traqué 1950 (French)	
Shadow of the Eagle	1950	Dario Sabatello/Scalera/Sparta/Tuscania/Valiant	La rivale dell'imperatrice 1951 (Italian)	
Un sourire dans la tempête (French)	1950	Acteurs et Technicians Alliance Francais	Ein Lächeln im Sturm 1951 (German)	
Vuelve Pancho Villa (Spanish)	1950	Hispano Continental	Pancho Villa Returns 1950 (English)	
Bluebeard (French: Barbe-Bleue)	1951	Alcina/Como Film/Union-Film	Blaubart 1951 (German)	
The Dream of Andalusia (Spanish: El sueño de Andalucía)	1951	CCFC/U.D.I.F./Columbia/C.E.A.	Andalousie 1951 (French)	
Love and Blood (Italian: Amore e sangue)	1951	A.B. Film/Comedia/La Quercia	Schatten über Neapel 1951 (German)	
Mon phoque et elles (French)	1951	Terra	Min vän Oscar 1951 (Swedish)	
Never Take No for an Answer (The Small Miracle)	1951	Constellation/Excelsa	Peppino e Violetta 1951 (Italian)	
Pardon My French	1951	Sagitta/Jupiter/Cusick	Dans la vie tout s'arrange 1952 (French)	
The Red Needle (French: L'aiguille rouge)	1951	Alcina/National	Verträumte Tage 1951 (German)	
Stronghold	1951	Lippert/Filmadora Internacional	Furia roja 1951 (Spanish)	
Adventure in Vienna (German: Abenteuer in Wien)	1952	Transglobe/Kriedel/Schönbrunn	Stolen Identity 1953 (English)	
The Girl with the Whip (French: La fille au fouet)	1952	Aidal Beaujon/Monopole/Karpat/Tempo-Film	Das Geheimnis vom Bergsee 1953 (Swiss German)	
Monte Carlo Baby	1952	Hoche	Nous irons à Monte Carlo 1952 (French)	
Plaisirs de Paris (French)	1952	Pallas/Spéva	Traumschöne Nacht 1952 (German)	
The Moon Is Blue	1953	Otto Preminger	Die Jungfrau auf dem Dach 1953 (German)	
Die Tochter der Kompanie (German)	1953	Alexander Salkind	La figlia del reggimento 1953 (Italian)	
Carnival Story	1954	King Brothers	Rummelplatz der Liebe 1954 (German)	
Godzilla (Japanese: Gojira)	1954	Toho	Godzilla, King of the Monsters! 1956 (English)	
The Gypsy Baron (German: Der Zigeunerbaron)	1954	Berolina	Baron Tzigane 1954 (French)	
Hungarian Rhapsody (German: Ungarische Rhapsodie)	1954	Florida/Gamma/Oska	Par ordre du tsar 1954 (French)	
La patrouille des sables (French)	1954	Sirius/Benito Perojo/Suevia/Véga	Tres hombres van a morir 1955 (Spanish)	
Il prigioniero del re (Italian)	1954	Venturini Film	Le Masque de fer 1955 (French)	
Bel Ami (French)	1955	Les Films Malesherbes/Projektograph/Kleber	Bel Ami 1955 (German)	
Ciske de Rat (Dutch)	1955	Filmproduktiemaatschappij Amsterdam/Omega Film	Ciske - Ein Kind braucht Liebe 1955 (German)	
Marianne of My Youth (French: Marianne de ma jeunesse)	1955	Filmsonor/Regina/Francinex/Royal/Allfram	Marianne 1955 (German)	
Oasis (French)	1955	Criterion/Roxy	Oase 1955 (German)	
Special Delivery	1955	Trans-Rhein Film	Vom Himmel gefallen 1955 (German)	
The Star of Rio (German: Stern von Rio)	1955	CCC/Ermes	Stella di Rio 1955 (Italian)	
The Three from the Filling Station (German: Die Drei von der Tankstelle)	1955	Berolina/Comptoir d'Expansion Cinématographique	Le chemin du paradis 1956 (French)	
Walk Into Paradise	1956	Discifilm/Southern International Productions	L'Odyssée du capitaine Steve 1956 (French)	
Jenny (Dutch)	1958	Bittins/Standaard	Acht Mädels im Boot 1959 (German)	
Die Sklavenkarawane (German)	1958	Neubert/Jesús Sáiz	Caravana de esclavos 1959 (Spanish)	
St. Peter's Umbrella (Slovak: Dáždnik svätého Petra)	1958	Hunnia Filmstúdió/Štúdio Hraných Filmov Bratislava	Szent Péter esernyője 1958 (Hungarian)	
The Stowaway	1958	Silver/Discifilm/Corona/Southern International Productions	Le passager clandestin 1958 (French)	
Der Löwe von Babylon (German)	1959	Neubert/CIFESA/Aquila	En las ruinas de Babilonia 1960 (Spanish)	
The Restless and the Damned (French: Amore e sangue)	1959	Silver/Chrysaor/Flora/Sud-Pacifique Films/Atel	The Restless and the Damned 1959 (English)	
Rommel Calls Cairo (German: Rommel ruft Kairo)	1959	Omega/Omnia	Foxhole in Cairo 1960 (English)	
The Hands of Orlac	1960	Riviera International/SOVIC/Pendennis	Les Mains d'Orlac 1960 (French)	
The Devil's Daffodil	1961	Rialto/Omnia	Das Geheimnis der gelben Narzissen 1961 (German)	
Five Golden Hours	1961	Anglofilm/Avers/Cinematografica Internazionale	Cinque ore in contanti 1961 (Italian)	
Reptilicus (Danish)	1961	Saga Studios	Reptilicus (English)	Danish-American giant monster film filmed in both Danish and English
Guide (Hindi)	1965	Navketan International	The Guide (English)	Both films were shot side-by-side. Though there were different directors.
Beş Ateşli Kadin (Turkish)	1968	Saner Film	Easabat Al'nisa 1969 (Arabic)	
Le Cerveau (French)	1969	Gaumont International/Dino de Laurentiis Cinematografica	The Brain (English)	The English version runs 20 minutes less than the French version.
Misir'in Gelen Gelin (Turkish)	1969	Kemal Film, Filmico Film	Aroos-e Istanbul (Persian) (Arabic) 1972	Same director
Malkoçoğlu Cem Sultan (Turkish)	1970	Duru Film / Misaghiye Studios	Serzemin-e Delaveran 1972 (Persian)	
Cîntecele mării (Romanian)	1970	Studioul Cinematografic București/Mosfilm	Pesni morya (Russian)	
Fadime (Turkish)	1970	Erler Film / Misaghiye Studios	In gorooh-e zebel (Persian)	
The Nameless Knight (Turkish: Adsız Cengaver)	1970	Erman Film / Misaghiye Studios	Farzande Shamshir 1972 (Persian)	Different directors with the same actors.
Ölüm Fermanı (Turkish)	1970	Topkapı Film / Misaghiye Studios	Se Delavar bibak 1971 (Persian)	The directors are different, but the actors are the same. The Turkish version was shown as an adventure film, in the Iranian version as a comedy.
Mive-ye gonah (Persian)	1970	Pars Film/Erler Film	Hak Yolu (Turkish)	
Selahattin Eyyubi (Turkish)	1970	Akün Film /Misaghiye Studios	Salahuddin Ayoubi 1972 (Persian)	Different directors with the same actors.
Le Casse (French)	1971	Columbia Films/Vides Cinematografica	The Burglars (English)	The English version is 11 minutes shorter than the original French version.
Kommissar X jagt die roten Tiger	1971	Regina Film Theo Maria Werner/KG Divina-Film GmbH & Co./Virginia Cinematografica S.r.l./Montana Film	Tiger Gang (Urdu)	
İki Esir (Turkish)	1971	Erler Film/Pars Film	Asir (Persian)	Different directors with the same actors.
Una matta, matta, matta corsa in Russia (Italian)	1973	Dino De Laurentiis Company/Mosfilm	Unbelievable Adventures of Italians in Russia (Russian: Neveroyatnye Priklyucheniya Italyantsev v Rossii)	Different directors
Karateciler İstanbul'da (Turkish)	1974	Erler Film	Mat Ling (Cantonese)	Same director with different sets of actors, in Hong Kong was shot additional scenes with Bolo Yeung
Che carambole ragazzi... (Italian)	1976	Erler Film/Dany Film	Üç kağıtçılar (Turkish); Se rafiq (Persian)	Different directors, with the same actors, but different characters' names
Ma-ma (Romanian)	1976	Romania Film/Mosfilm/Ralux Film	Rock'n'Roll Wolf (English); Ma-Ma (Russian)	The three versions were shot back to back.
The Message (English)	1976	Filmco International Productions Inc.	Ar-Risālah (Arabic)	Separately shot. Arabic version is 29 minutes longer than the English version.
Acı Hatıralar (Turkish)	1977	Erler Film	Sarsapardeh (Persian)	Different directors with the same actors.
İnsanları Seveceksin (Turkish)	1978	Gülgen Film/Piza Film	Kriminal Porno (Italian)	The Italian version added erotic scenes and was 9 minutes shorter than the Turkish version.
Nosferatu: Phantom of the Night (German: Nosferatu - Phantom der Nacht)	1979	Werner Herzog Filmproduktion/Gaumont/Zweites Deutsches Fernsehen	Nosferatu the Vampyre (English)	
Bandish (Urdu)	1980		Juwita (Indonesian)	Different directors with the same actors.
Maria, Mirabela (Romanian)	1981	Moldova-Film/Soyuzmultfilm/Casa de Filme 5	Maria, Mirabela (Russian)	
Oasis of the Zombies (French: L'Abîme des morts vivants)	1982	Eurociné/Marte/Diasa	La tumba de los muertos vivientes 1983 (Spanish)	
The Return of Godzilla (Japanese: Gojira)	1984	Toho	Godzilla 1985 (English)	
Orions belte (Norwegian)	1985		Orion's Belt (1985) (English)	Different directors, but the same actors.
Il Piccolo Diavolo (Italian)	1988	Cecchi Gori Group	The Little Devil (English)	
Un amour de sorcière (French)	1997	Les Films Christian Fechner / TF1 Films Production / Canal+	A Witch's Way of Love (English)	
Cuisine américaine (French)	1998	Les Films Balenciaga / M6 Films / PolyGram Audiovisuel	American Cuisine (English)	
Nouvelle-France (French)	2004	Lions Gate / Melenny / UKFS / Davis	Battle of the Brave 2005 (English)	
Nomad	2005	Ibrus/Kazakhfilm/True Story/Wild Bunch	Köşpendiler 2005 (Kazakh)	
Hui lu (Mandarin)	2007	Bigfoot Entertainment	Irreversi (English)	
Polytechnique (French)	2009	Alliance Films/Remstar/Wild Bunch	Polytechnique (English)	
In the Land of Blood and Honey	2011	GK Films		Made with two versions. One version in geographically accurate Bosnian, Serbian, and Croatian, and one in English, shot back to back.
Kon-Tiki	2012	Nordisk Film		Two versions were shot back-to-back, one in Norwegian and one in English.
A Teia de Gelo	2012	Cinemate		Two versions were shot back-to-back, one in Portuguese and one in English.
The Night Eats the World	2018	WTFilms		One in French and one in English.
Din–The Day (Bangla)	2022	Monsoon Films	Rooz (Persian)	
Here Now (English)	2024	Lotus Production; Rai Cinema	Fino alla fine (Italian)	Same director and cast.

== See also ==
- Symphony in Two Flats, a 1930 British drama film with two versions, one starring Benita Hume (as "Lesley Fullerton") for the UK release and the other starring Jacqueline Logan (as "Leslie Fullerton") for the US release
- Hinterland (TV series)
- International Sound Version
- Part-talkie
- Sound film
- History of film
- List of early Warner Bros. talking features
- List of multilingual Indian films
- Pan-Indian film
- List of longest films in India
