= Passion (1925 film) =

1925 film directed by Richard Eichberg

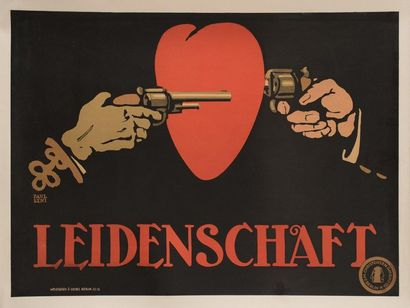
- Directed by: Richard Eichberg
- Written by: Helmuth Orthmann; Hans Sturm
- Produced by: Richard Eichberg
- Starring: Otto Gebühr; Lilian Harvey; Camilla von Hollay; Henri Peters-Arnolds
- Cinematography: Erich Grimmler; Willy Hameister
- Production company: Richard Eichberg-Film
- Distributed by: Süd-Film
- Release date: 26 April 1925
- Country: Germany
- Languages: Silent; German intertitles

Passion (German: Leidenschaft) is a 1925 German silent drama film directed by Richard Eichberg and starring Otto Gebühr, Lilian Harvey and Camilla von Hollay. Harvey was by this time a rising star, and followed it with her breakthrough film Love and Trumpets released the same year.

The film's art direction was by Siegfried Wroblewsky and Jacek Rotmil.

== Cast ==
- Otto Gebühr as Olaf von Hallbek
- Lilian Harvey as Hella von Gilsa
- Camilla von Hollay as Ilse
- Henri Peters-Arnolds as Detlev
- Edda Stevens as Maria
- Dina Gralla as Pepi Gschwandner
- Owen Gorin as Bernd Arvig
- Hermann Picha as Waldemar Bornemann
- Kurt Vespermann as Rudi Anthofer
- Lydia Potechina as Helene Odanski

== Bibliography ==
- Ascheid, Antje (2010). Hitler's Heroines: Stardom and Womanhood in Nazi Cinema. Philadelphia: Temple University Press. ISBN 978-1-59213-843-2.
- Bock, Hans-Michael; Bergfelder, Tim, eds. (2009). The Concise Cinegraph: Encyclopaedia of German Cinema. New York: Berghahn Books. ISBN 978-1-57181-655-9.
