= The Curse (1924 film) =

1924 film

- Scene from a film
- German: Der Fluch
- Directed by: Robert Land
- Written by: Walter Reisch; Ernst Weizmann
- Produced by: Robert Land
- Starring: Lilian Harvey; Oscar Beregi; Albert Heine; Ferdinand Bonn
- Cinematography: Nicolas Farkas
- Production company: Land-Film
- Release date: 28 February 1925 (Austria)
- Country: Austria
- Languages: Silent; German intertitles

The Curse (German: Der Fluch) is a 1924 Austrian drama film directed by Robert Land and starring Lilian Harvey, Oscar Beregi and Albert Heine. It was shot at the Sievering Studios.

The film marked the screen debut of Lilian Harvey who would go on to become one of the top stars at the German box office during the late Weimar and early Nazi eras. Harvey was in Vienna at the time because she was appearing in a stage revue show.

== Plot ==
A young Jewish woman in an Eastern European shtetl struggles to reconcile her aspirations with her duty to her family. As her lifestyle grows wilder, her mother is shocked by her immoral behaviour and commits suicide by drowning - repeating "the curse" which has haunted the family for centuries.

== Cast ==
- Lilian Harvey as Ruth
- Oscar Beregi as Jehuda Nachmann
- Albert Heine as Esra
- Ferdinand Bonn as Rabbi Eliser
- Isak Deutsch as pimp
- Alice Hétsey as housekeeper
- Anny Hornik as Lea
- Reinhold Häussermann as matchmaker
- Ria Jászonyi as Rahel
- Olga Lewinsky as midwife
- Ferdinand Mayerhofer as doctor
- Milena Mudin as Miriam, waiter
- Anton Pointner
- Eugen Preiß as Acolyte
- Otto Schmöle as Gatekeeper
- Hans Thimig as Sinche

== Bibliography ==
- Ascheid, Antje (2003). Hitler's Heroines: Stardom and Womanhood in Nazi Cinema. Culture and the Moving Image. Philadelphia: Temple University Press. ISBN 156639984X. JSTOR j.ctt14bs6q0.
