= Lilian Harvey =

British-born German actress and singer

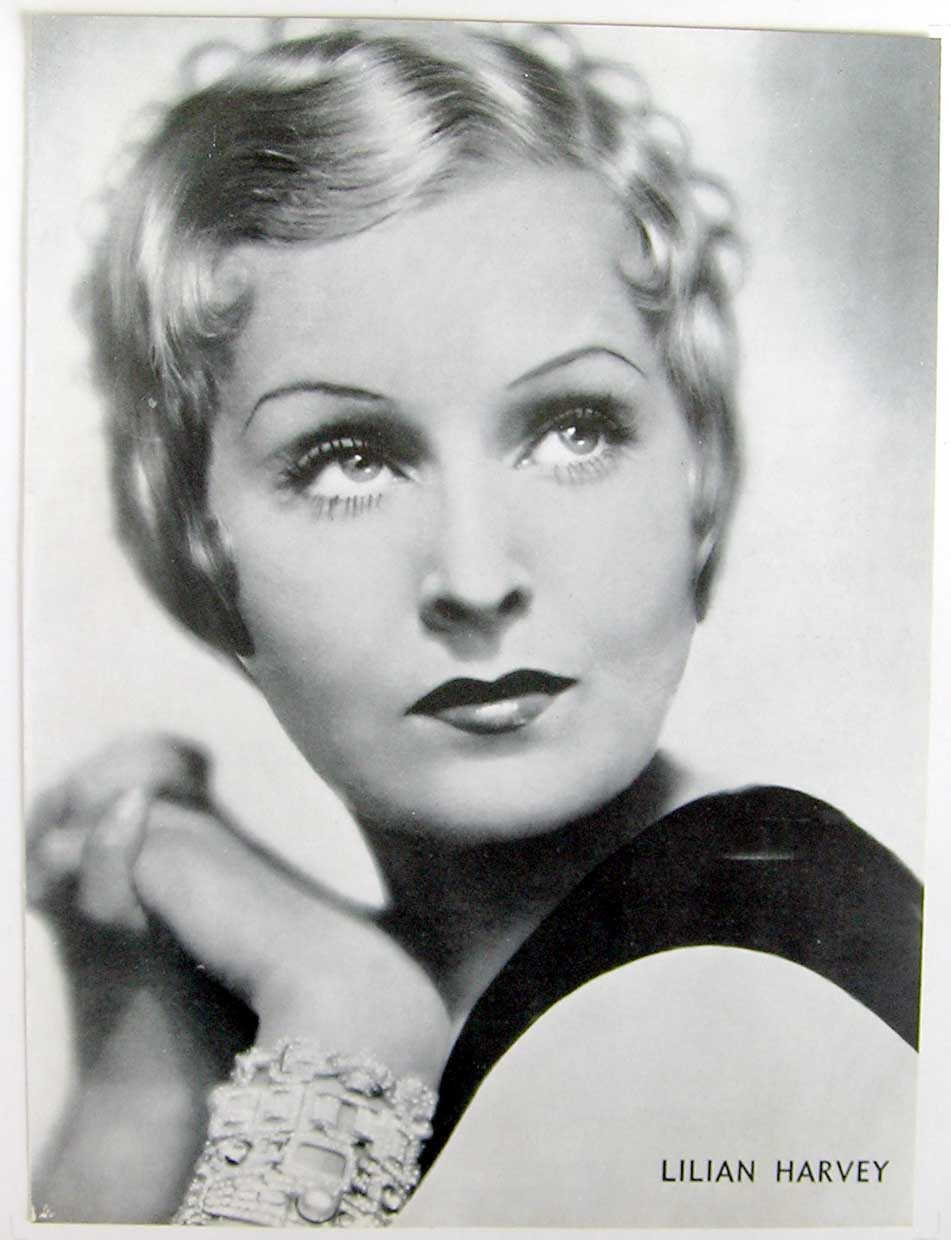
- Lilian Harvey in 1932
- Born: Helene Lilian Muriel Pape; 19 January 1906; London, United Kingdom
- Died: 27 July 1968 (aged 62); Juan-les-Pins, France
- Occupation: Actress
- Years active: 1924–1940
- Spouse: Hartvig Valeur-Larsen (1953–1957)

Lilian Harvey (born Helene Lilian Muriel Pape; 19 January 1906 – 27 July 1968) was a British-German actress and singer, long based in Germany, where she is best known for her role as Christel Weinzinger in Erik Charell's 1931 film Der Kongreß tanzt.

== Career ==
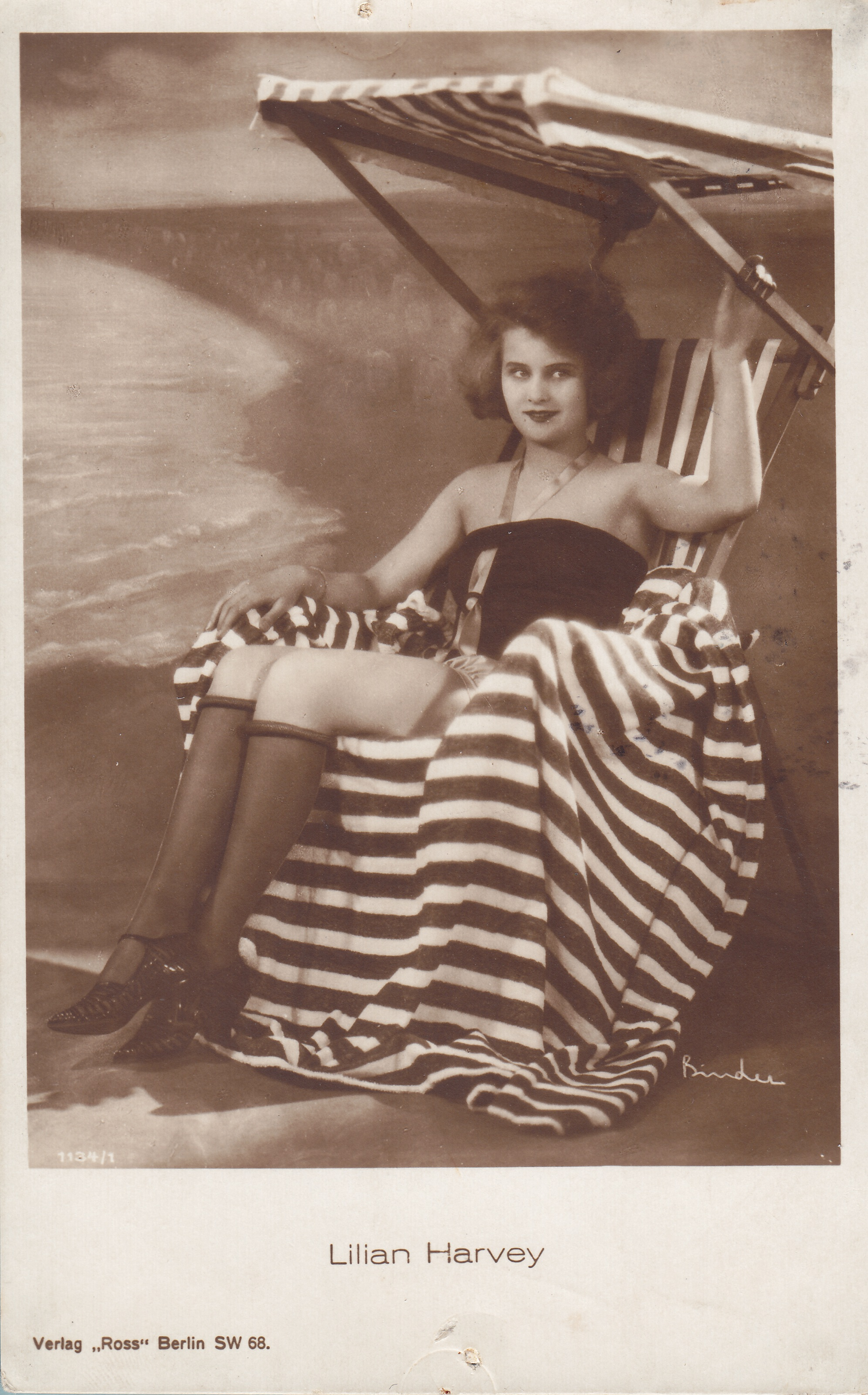
Lilian Harvey, photographed by Alexander Binder. Ross Verlag. Collection EYE Film Institute Netherlands.

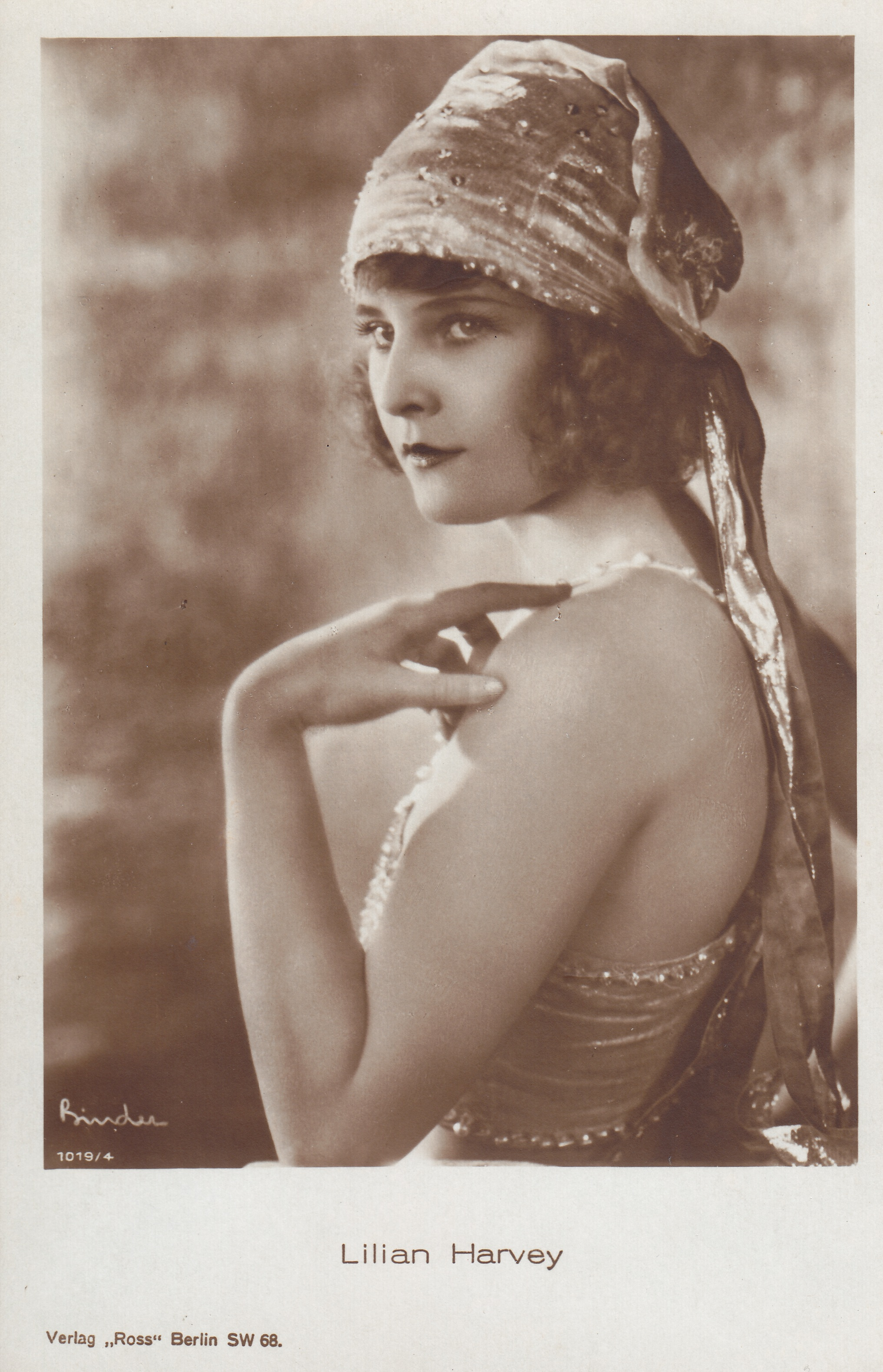
Lilian Harvey, photographed by Alexander Binder. Ross Verlag. Collection EYE Film Institute Netherlands.

After an engagement as a revue dancer in Vienna in 1924, Harvey received her first movie role as the young Jewish girl "Ruth" in the Austrian film The Curse directed by Robert Land. Subsequently, she starred in many silent films. In 1925, she was cast in her first leading role in the film Passion by Richard Eichberg, alongside Otto Gebühr.

Because of her training as a singer, Harvey was able to pursue a successful acting career during the initial talkie era of the early 1930s. Her first movie with Willy Fritsch was the operetta film Chaste Susanne in 1926. Harvey and Fritsch became the "dream couple" of German movies in the early 1930s with the romantic love story Waltz of Love made by film production company Universum-Film Aktiengesellschaft (UFA); she was called the "sweetest girl in the world" by the press, after a song featured in the film. She and Fritsch starred in a total of 11 movies together, among them the criminal comedy Hokuspokus (1930) after a play by Curt Goetz, directed by Gustav Ucicky, which became a box office success. An English version (The Temporary Widow) was filmed simultaneously, starring Lilian Harvey and Laurence Olivier, who thereby made his film debut. She also appeared in the musical film The Three from the Filling Station of the same year, which also became a major success and gave the young actor Heinz Rühmann his break. During this period she became the muse of the composer Charles Koechlin who, in his sixties, wrote numerous pieces in her honour; initially flattered, she soon became disturbed by his apparent obsession with her.

In 1931, Harvey played the leading part in the film Der Kongreß tanzt (The Congress Dances); her song Das gibt's nur einmal written by Werner R. Heymann became a most popular melody. Her subsequent movies were filmed in English and French versions, so Harvey became known outside of Germany. She was invited to Hollywood and made four movies for the Fox Film Corporation, but these were not as successful as her German films. She eventually abandoned George White's Scandals, leading executives to cast Alice Faye in the part, and Faye became an overnight sensation. After leaving Hollywood she appeared in a British film Invitation to the Waltz. In 1935, Lilian Harvey returned to Germany.

=== Emigration from Germany ===
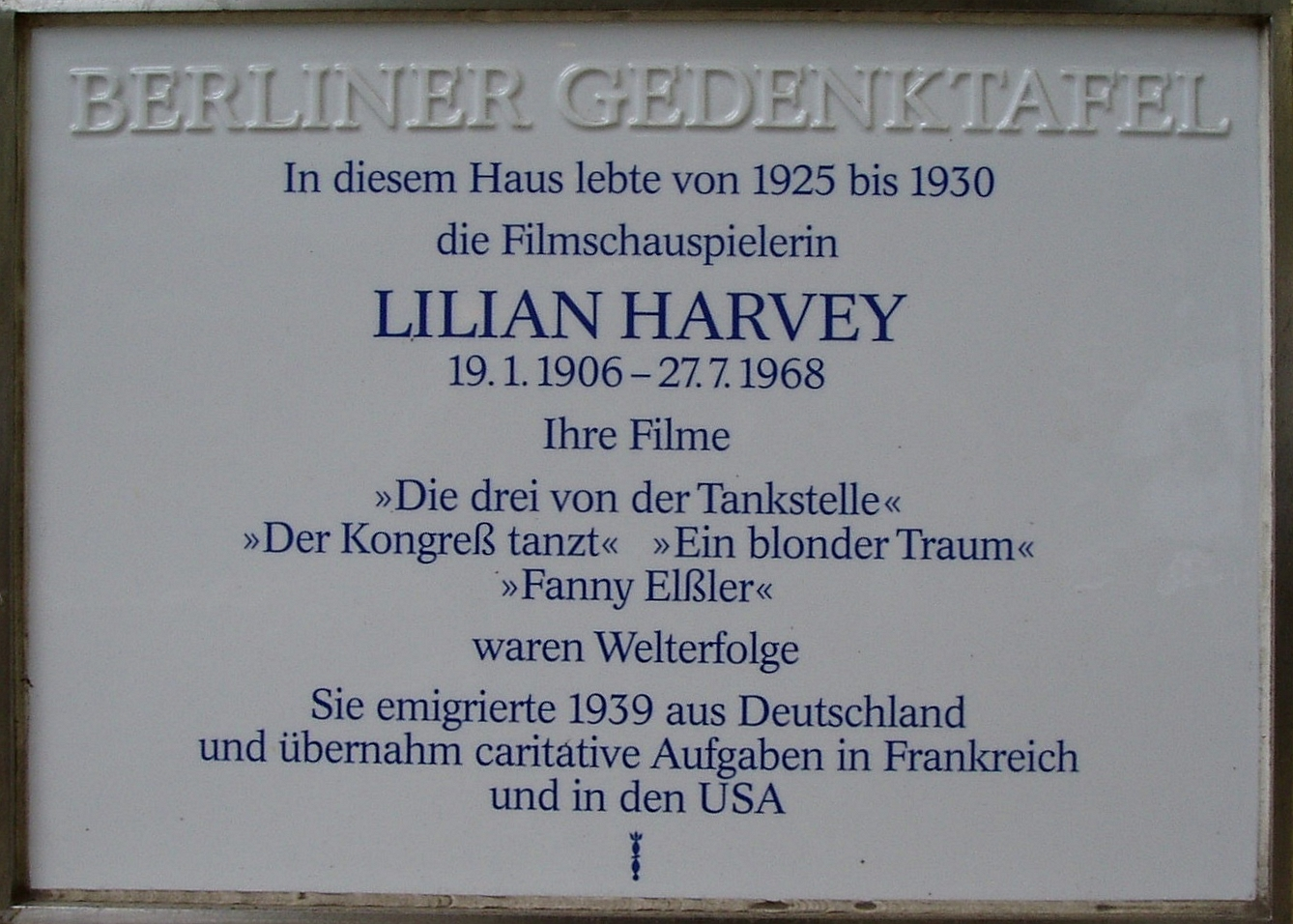
Berlin memorial plaque in Wilmersdorf

As she was still in touch with her Jewish colleagues, Harvey was placed under close observation by the Gestapo. Nevertheless she pushed the career of her protégé, director Paul Martin, performing in his screwball comedy Lucky Kids (1936) and further successful movies for UFA until 1939, such as Seven Slaps, the biographical film Fanny Elssler (1937) together with Willy Birgel and Capriccio; as well as Woman at the Wheel in 1939.

In June 1937 Harvey had helped the choreographer Jens Keith, prosecuted under the homosexual acts Paragraph 175, by posting a bail for him. Released from custody, Keith escaped to Paris; this led to a stern interrogation by the Nazi authorities. He subsequently returned to Berlin and UFA. In spring 1939, Harvey left Germany without her real-estate fortune, which was confiscated; she was to be deprived of her German citizenship in 1943 because she had performed for French troops.

Harvey went to live at her residence in Juan-les-Pins in France. In France she made two movies before the German invasion in 1940 – Serenade and Miquette (her last), both directed by Jean Boyer.

After the occupation of southern France by German forces in November 1942, Harvey emigrated to the United States. She spent most of the time in Los Angeles working as a volunteer nurse, but also went on tour performing in Noël Coward's Blithe Spirit.

=== After World War II ===
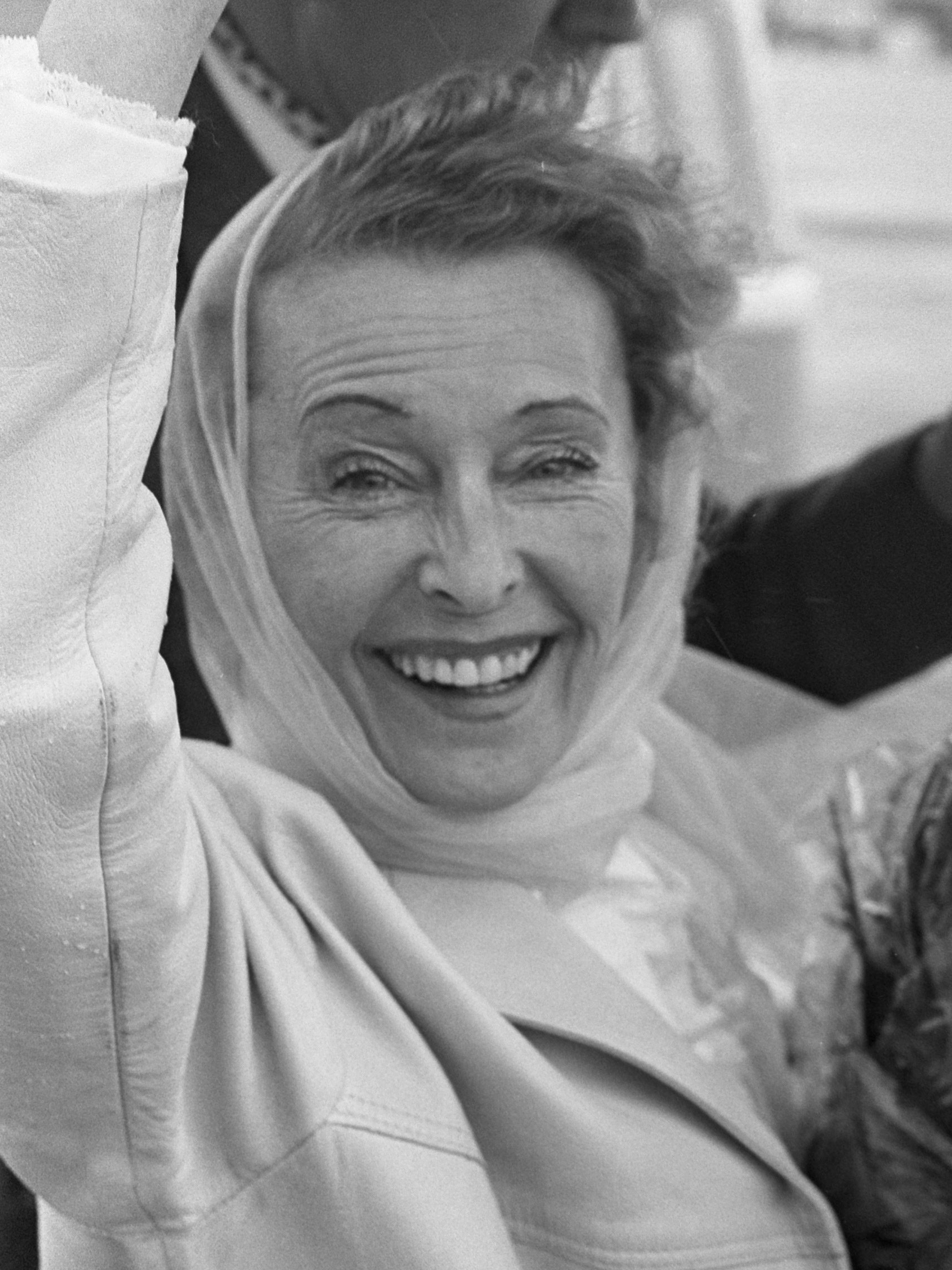
Lilian Harvey (1963)

On May 19th 1947, Harvey flew to Paris to star in the hit revue Paris Qui S'Amuse by Jean Valmy and Jules Borkon; she also took the opportunity to recover her requisitioned French villa. In the following years, she travelled as a singer through Scandinavia and Egypt. In 1949, she returned to West Germany giving several concerts. Harvey retired to the resort town of Antibes on the French Riviera, where she operated a souvenir shop and raised edible snails. In 1955/1956 she met Else Wirth on a tour of the GDR, who from then on became her partner and colleague. Harvey received compensation in the form of a pension from the federal government for the assets confiscated during the Nazi era.

== Private life ==
On 7 February 1953 Harvey married the Danish concert manager Hartvig Valeur-Larsen in Copenhagen, Denmark.

== Death ==
Lilian Harvey died in her own hotel in Juan-les-Pins of liver failure on 27 July 1968, aged 62. She was buried at the Robiac Cemetery in Antibes.

== Filmography ==
Year	Title	Role	Language	Notes
1925	The Motorist Bride	(uncredited)	Silent	Stunt double for Lee Parry
1925	The Curse	Ruth	Silent	
1925	Passion	Hella von Gilsa	Silent	
1925	Love and Trumpets	Komtesse Maria Charlotte	Silent	
1925	The Girl on the Road	Die 'Kleine'	Silent	
1926	Princess Trulala	Prinzessin Trulala	Silent	
1926	Chaste Susanne	Jacqueline	Silent	
1926	It's Easy to Become a Father	Harriet	Silent	
1927	Fabulous Lola	Tänzerin Tilly Schneider aka Lola Cornero	Silent	
1927	Vacation from Marriage	Hella Strakosch	Silent	
1928	The Love Commandment	Lotte	Silent	
1928	A Knight in London	Aline Morland	Silent	
1929	Her Dark Secret	Lilian von Trucks / Yvette	Silent	
1929	Rund um die Liebe		Silent	Archive footage
1929	The Model from Montparnasse	Mascotte	Silent	
1929	Once You Give Away Your Heart	Dolly	German	
1930	Waltz of Love	Princess Eva	German	MLV
1930	The Love Waltz	Princess Eva	English	MLV
1930	Hocuspocus	Kitty Kellermann	German	MLV
1930	The Three from the Filling Station	Lilian Cossmann	German	MLV
1930	The Temporary Widow	Kitty Kellermann	English	MLV
1930	Burglars	Reneé	German	
1930	The Road to Paradise	Liliane Bourcart	French	MLV
1931	The Girl and the Boy	Jenny Berger / Ria bella	French	MLV
1931	Princess, At Your Orders!	La princesse Marie-Christine	French	
1931	No More Love	Gladys O'Halloran	German	MLV
1931	Calais-Dover	Gladys O'Halloran	French	MLV
1931	Der Kongreß tanzt	Christel Weinzinger, Gloves-seller	German	MLV
1931	Le congrès s'amuse	Christine "Christel" Weizinger	French	MLV
1932	Two Hearts Beat as One	Jenny Müller	German	MLV
1932	Congress Dances	Christel	English	MLV
1932	Quick	Eva	German	MLV
1932	Quick	Christine Dawson	French	MLV
1932	A Blonde Dream	Jou-Jou	German	MLV
1932	Un rêve blond	Jou-Jou	French	MLV
1932	Happy Ever After	Jou-Jou	English	MLV
1933	The Empress and I	Juliette	German	MLV
1933	Moi et l'impératrice	Juliette	French	MLV
1933	The Only Girl	Juliette	English	MLV
1933	My Weakness	Looloo Blake	English	
1933	My Lips Betray	Lili Wieler	English	
1933	I Am Suzanne	Suzanne	English	
1935	Let's Live Tonight	Kay 'Carlotta' Routledge	English	
1935	Invitation to the Waltz	Jenny Peachey	English	
1935	Schwarze Rosen	Tania Fedorovna	German	MLV
1936	Roses noires	Tatiana	French	MLV
1936	Black Roses	Tania Fedorovna	English	MLV
1936	Lucky Kids	Ann Garden	German	MLV
1936	Les gais lurons	Ann Garden	French	MLV
1937	Seven Slaps	Daisy Terbanks	German	
1937	Fanny Elssler	Fanny Elssler	German	
1938	Capriccio	Madelone d’Estroux	German	
1939	Castles in the Air	Annie Wagner	Italian	MLV
1939	Ins blaue Leben	Annie Wagner	German	MLV
1939	Woman at the Wheel	Maria Kelemen	German	
1940	Serenade	Margaret Brenton	French	
1940	Miquette	Miquette Grandier	French	

== In popular media ==
In Quentin Tarantino's 2009 film Inglourious Basterds, Lillian Harvey's duet with Willy Fritsch from the 1936 film Lucky Kids, "Ich wollt' ich wär ein Huhn" ("I wish I were a chicken") can be heard playing on a phonograph in the basement scene "La Louisiane" as well as in the extended scene "Lunch With Goebbels", as Joseph Goebbels (Sylvester Groth) happily sings a portion of the song after deciding to hold a private screening of the film. After the screening, cinema owner Shosanna Dreyfus (Mélanie Laurent), under the alias "Emmanuelle Mimieux", comments on liking Lilian Harvey in the film – to which an irritated Goebbels angrily insists her name never be mentioned again in his presence. The song as performed by the Comedian Harmonists remains popular in Germany to date.

The music from Der Kongreß tanzt appears in Hayao Miyazaki’s 2013 animated movie The Wind Rises.

There is a Blue Plaque on the house where Lilian Harvey was born in Crouch End, North London.
