= Paul Martin (director) =

Hungarian film director (1899–1967)

- Born: 8 February 1899; Kolozsvár, Transylvania, Austria-Hungary (now Cluj-Napoca, Romania)
- Died: 26 January 1967 (aged 67); West Berlin, West Germany (now Berlin, Germany)
- Occupations: Film director; Screenwriter
- Years active: 1932–1967

Paul Martin (8 February 1899 – 26 January 1967) was a Hungarian film director and screenwriter who worked for many years in the German film industry. He directed 60 films between 1932 and 1967. He was romantically involved with the film star Lilian Harvey and directed her in a number of films until he left her in 1938 for the actress Frauke Lauterbach. They made one final film Woman at the Wheel together during the filming of which their relationship remained cold.

== Selected filmography ==
=== Screenwriter ===
- Come Back, All Is Forgiven (1929)

=== Director ===
Film

- Happy Ever After (1932)
- The Victor (1932)
- A Blonde Dream (1932)
- Orient Express (1934)
- Black Roses (1935)
- Lucky Kids (1936)
- Seven Slaps (1937)
- Fanny Elssler (1937)
- A Prussian Love Story (1938)
- The Desert Song (1939)
- Woman at the Wheel (1939)
- What Does Brigitte Want? (1941)
- Beloved Darling (1943)
- Carnival of Love (1943)
- Mask in Blue (1943)
- That Was My Life (1944)
- The Deadly Dreams (1951)
- Heart's Desire (1951)
- Don't Ask My Heart (1952)
- When the Heath Dreams at Night (1952)
- The Private Secretary (1953)
- Life Begins at Seventeen (1953)
- Red Roses, Red Lips, Red Wine (1953)
- The Big Star Parade (1954)
- My Sister and I (1954)
- Ball at the Savoy (1955)
- Love, Dance and a Thousand Songs (1955)
- The Bath in the Barn (1956)
- La Paloma (1959)
- Yes, Women are Dangerous (1960)
- Adieu, Lebewohl, Goodbye (1961)
- Ramona (1961)
- Wedding Night In Paradise (1962)
- Massacre at Marble City (1964)
- Diamond Walkers (1965)
- Count Bobby, The Terror of The Wild West (1966)

Television

- Bezauberndes Fräulein (1963) – (based on Bezauberndes Fräulein)
- Die lustige Witwe (1963) – (based on The Merry Widow)
- Jenny und der Herr im Frack (1964) – (remake of Jenny und der Herr im Frack, 1941)
- Paris ist eine Reise wert (1966) – (screenplay by Max Colpet)
- Das kleine Teehaus (co-director: Eugen York, 1967) – (based on The Teahouse of the August Moon)

== Bibliography ==
- Ascheid, Antje (2003). Hitler's Heroines: Stardom and Womanhood in Nazi Cinema. Philadelphia: Temple University Press. ISBN 978-1-56639-984-5.
