= Woman at the Wheel =

1939 film

- Directed by: Paul Martin
- Written by: Pál Barabás (play); Paul Hellbracht; Paul Martin
- Produced by: Max Pfeiffer
- Starring: Lilian Harvey; Willy Fritsch; Leo Slezak; Grethe Weiser
- Cinematography: Fritz Böttger
- Edited by: Klaus Stapenhorst
- Music by: Harald Böhmelt
- Production company: UFA
- Distributed by: UFA
- Release date: 20 June 1939
- Running time: 74 minutes
- Country: Germany
- Language: German

Woman at the Wheel (German: Frau am Steuer) is a 1939 German romantic comedy film directed by Paul Martin and starring Lilian Harvey, Willy Fritsch and Leo Slezak. It was the last German film featuring Harvey, who had been the leading box office star in Germany during the 1930s, although she made two further films after moving to France.

== Production ==
The film reunited Harvey and Fritsch who had appeared in several hit films together including The Three from the Filling Station and Congress Dances. It was based on a play by the Hungarian writer Pál Barabás. Harvey was unhappy with the screenplay, which she felt made her character too unsympathetic, but was contractually obliged to appear in the production.

The film's sets were designed by the art director Erich Kettelhut. Location shooting took place in Budapest and Vienna.

== Synopsis ==
A young office worker in Budapest proposes to his colleague, who accepts. However, he is fired because all male employees of the company have to be married (and his ceremony took place three days too late). He finds himself unemployed and works as a house husband while his wife is successful at the office and enjoys being the family breadwinner. Feeling emasculated he eventually leaves her and moves back in with his mother. His former boss tries to bring about a reconciliation by re-employing him at the company, but he now has to work under his wife which he finds unbearable. The dispute is eventually resolved when she announces that she is pregnant and will be leaving work to care for their expanding family.

== Main cast ==
- Lilian Harvey as Maria Kelemen
- Willy Fritsch as Paul Banky
- Leo Slezak as Generaldirektor
- Grethe Weiser as Anni Bertok
- Georg Alexander as Direktor Bordon
- Rudolf Platte as Pauls Freund
- Hans Junkermann as Diener des Generaldirektors
- Lotte Spira as Marias Mutter

== Bibliography ==
- Ascheid, Antje (2003). Hitler's Heroines: Stardom and Womanhood in Nazi Cinema. Philadelphia: Temple University Press. ISBN 978-1-56639-984-5.
