= Love and Trumpets =

Love and Trumpets (German:Liebe und Trompetenblasen) may refer to:

- Love and Trumpets (1925 film), a German silent film
- Love and Trumpets (1954 film), a West German film
