= Capriccio (1938 film) =

1938 film

- Directed by: Karl Ritter
- Written by: Franz Baumann; Felix Lützkendorf; Karl Ritter
- Produced by: Karl Ritter
- Starring: Lilian Harvey; Viktor Staal; Paul Kemp; Paul Dahlke
- Cinematography: Günther Anders
- Edited by: Gottfried Ritter
- Music by: Alois Melichar
- Production company: UFA
- Distributed by: UFA
- Release date: 11 August 1938
- Running time: 105 minutes
- Country: Germany
- Language: German

Capriccio is a 1938 German historical comedy film directed by Karl Ritter and starring Lilian Harvey, Viktor Staal and Paul Kemp. The film is set in 18th century France, where a young woman enjoys a series of romantic adventures. The director, Ritter, was attempting to recreate the style of a René Clair comedy. Harvey made only one further film in Germany before leaving for France.

It was shot at the Babelsberg Studios of UFA in Potsdam and premiered at the Gloria-Palast in Berlin. The film's sets were designed by the art director Walter Röhrig.

== Cast ==
- Lilian Harvey as Madelone aka Don Juan
- Viktor Staal as Fernand de Villeneuve
- Paul Kemp as Henri de Grau
- Paul Dahlke as Cesaire
- Anton Imkamp as General d'Estroux
- Aribert Wäscher as Barberousse
- Kate Kühl as Gräfin Mallefougasse
- Margot Höpfner as Eve Mallefougasse
- Hedi Höpfner as Anais Mallefougasse

== Reception ==
Joseph Goebbels was critical of the film stating that it was "terrible filth. Supposed to be a musical comedy. Trivial, boring, frivolous and taste-less. A disgrace for Ritter". Adolf Hitler stated that it was "shit of the highest order".

== Works cited ==
- Niven, Bill (2018). Hitler and Film: The Führer's Hidden Passion. Yale University Press. ISBN 9780300200362.

== Bibliography ==
- Ascheid, Antje (2010) [2003]. Hitler's Heroines: Stardom and Womanhood in Nazi Cinema. Philadelphia: Temple University Press. ISBN 978-1-59213-843-2.
- Klaus, Ulrich J. Deutsche Tonfilme: Jahrgang 1938. Klaus-Archiv, 1988.
