= Seven Slaps =

1937 film

- Directed by: Paul Martin
- Written by: Bobby E. Lüthge; Paul Martin; Curt Goetz
- Based on: Hét pofon (novel) by Károly Aszlányi
- Produced by: Max Pfeiffer
- Starring: Lilian Harvey; Willy Fritsch; Alfred Abel
- Cinematography: Konstantin Irmen-Tschet
- Edited by: Carl Otto Bartning
- Music by: Kurt Schröder
- Production company: UFA
- Distributed by: UFA
- Release date: 3 August 1937
- Running time: 97 minutes
- Country: Germany
- Language: German

Seven Slaps (German: Sieben Ohrfeigen) is a 1937 German comedy film directed by Paul Martin and starring Lilian Harvey, Willy Fritsch and Alfred Abel. Like the earlier Lucky Kids, which had the same director and stars, it was an attempt to create a German version of screwball comedy. While the previous film had a New York setting, this takes place in London. It was shot at the Babelsberg Studios in Berlin. The film's sets were designed by the art director Erich Kettelhut. It was loosely remade in 1970 as Slap in the Face.

== Synopsis ==
After he loses some money on the stock exchange, a young man seeks revenge on the speculator responsible by slapping him. He intends to slap him once every day for a week as retribution, but things become complicated when he becomes entangled with the speculator's attractive daughter.

== Cast ==
- Lilian Harvey as Daisy Terbanks - Astor's Daughter
- Willy Fritsch as William Tenson MacPhab
- Alfred Abel as Astor Terbanks - Sein Finanzgewaltiger
- Oskar Sima as Wennington Laskett - Reporter
- Erich Fiedler as Ernie Earl of Wigglebottom
- Ernst Legal as Mr. Strawman
- Otz Tollen as Balthasar Adula Flanelli - Verwandlungskünstler
- Ernst Behmer as Bankangestellter
- Erwin Biegel as Aufgeregter bankkunde
- Erich Dunskus as Schmiedegeselle In Gretna Green
- Max Hiller as 1. Zuschauer beim Fußballspiel
- Horst Birr as Schmiedegeselle in Gretna Green
- Jac Diehl as Schutzmann
- Karl Harbacher as Sekretär Charly
- Hanns Waschatko as Butler Leslie
- Rudolf Klicks as 1. Bankdirektor
- F.W. Schröder-Schrom as 2. Bankdirektor
- Otto Stoeckel as 3. Bankdirektor
- Josef Reithofer as Detektiv
- Georg H. Schnell as Dr. Lorenz
- Walter Steinweg as Chauffeur Von Dr. Lorenz
- Max Wilmsen as Conférencier im Rostigen Nagel
- Charles Francois as Ein Mitarbeiter Von Astor Terbanks
- Paul Ludwig Frey as Ein Gast Im Kabarett Rostiger Nagel
- Eric Harden as Ein Zeitung lesendes Klubmitglied
- Albert Karchow as 2. Zuschauer beim Fußballspiel
- Gustav Püttjer as 3. Zuschauer beim Fußballspiel
- Paul Schwed as Detektiv
- Egon Stief as Starker Mann beim Fußballspiel
- Alfred Stratmann as Büroangestellter

== Bibliography ==
- Eric Rentschler. The Ministry of Illusion: Nazi Cinema and Its Afterlife. Harvard University Press, 1996.
