= The Girl and the Boy =

1931 film

- Directed by: Wilhelm Thiele; Roger Le Bon
- Written by: André Birabeau (play); Georges Dolley (play); Raoul Ploquin; Franz Schulz
- Starring: Lilian Harvey; Henri Garat; Lucien Baroux
- Cinematography: Carl Hoffmann
- Music by: Jean Gilbert
- Production company: UFA
- Distributed by: L'Alliance Cinématographique Européenne
- Release date: 5 March 1931
- Country: Germany
- Language: French

The Girl and the Boy (French: La fille et le garçon) is a 1931 comedy film directed by Roger Le Bon and Wilhelm Thiele and starring Lilian Harvey, Henri Garat, and Lucien Baroux. It was made by the major studio UFA as the French-language version of Two Hearts Beat as One, which also starred Harvey. Such multiple-language versions were common in the early years of sound before dubbing became more widespread.

== Cast ==
- Lilian Harvey as Jenny Berger / Ria bella
- Henri Garat as Victor Berger
- Lucien Baroux as Le duc d'Auribeau
- Mady Berry as Mme Bientôt
- Léonce Corne as Un avocat
- Marcel Vallée as Maurice Bientôt

== Bibliography ==
- Bock, Hans-Michael; Bergfelder, Tim, eds. (2009). The Concise Cinegraph: Encyclopaedia of German Cinema. Berghahn Books. ISBN 978-1-57181-655-9.
