= The Only Girl (film) =

1933 film

- Directed by: Friedrich Hollaender
- Written by: Paul Frank; Robert Liebmann; Walter Reisch; Felix Salten; Robert Stevenson
- Produced by: Erich Pommer
- Starring: Lilian Harvey; Charles Boyer; Mady Christians
- Cinematography: Friedl Behn-Grund
- Edited by: Heinz G. Janson; René Métain
- Music by: Franz Waxman
- Production companies: UFA; Gainsborough Pictures
- Distributed by: Fox Film
- Release date: May 1933
- Running time: 89 minutes
- Countries: Germany; United Kingdom
- Language: English

The Only Girl is a 1933 British-German musical film directed by Friedrich Hollaender and starring Lilian Harvey, Charles Boyer, and Mady Christians. It is the English-language version of The Empress and I which also starred Harvey and Christians. It was the last in a series of MLV co-productions between UFA and Gainsborough Pictures. It was released in the United States in 1934 by Fox Film.

== Cast ==
- Lilian Harvey as Juliette
- Charles Boyer as The Duke
- Mady Christians as The Empress
- Maurice Evans as Didier
- Friedel Schuster as Arabella
- Ernest Thesiger as The Chamberlain
- Julius Falkenstein as Offenbach
- Huntley Wright as The Regimental Doctor
- Reginald Smith as The Hospital Orderly
- Ruth Maitland as Marianne
- O. B. Clarence as Etienne
- Hubert von Meyerinck

== Bibliography ==
- Bock, Hans-Michael; Bergfelder, Tim, eds. (2009). The Concise Cinegraph: Encyclopaedia of German Cinema. New York: Berghahn Books. ISBN 978-1-57181-655-9.
- Bergfelder, Tim; Cargnelli, Christian, eds. (2008). Destination London: German-Speaking Emigrés and British Cinema, 1925–1950. New York: Berghahn Books. ISBN 978-0-85745-019-7.
