= Slap in the Face (film) =

1970 film

- DVD cover
- Directed by: Rolf Thiele
- Written by: Willibald Eser; Paul Hengge; Peter M. Thouet
- Based on: Seven Slaps (novel) by Károly Aszlányi
- Produced by: Herbert Maris
- Starring: Curd Jürgens; Gila von Weitershausen; Alexandra Stewart
- Cinematography: Wolf Wirth
- Edited by: Alfred Srp
- Music by: Uli Röver
- Production company: Maris Film
- Distributed by: Inter-Verleih Film
- Release date: 5 March 1970
- Running time: 89 minutes
- Country: West Germany
- Language: German

Slap in the Face (German: Ohrfeigen) is a 1970 West German comedy film directed by Rolf Thiele and starring Curd Jürgens, Gila von Weitershausen, and Alexandra Stewart. The film was shot on location in Hamburg, Lübeck and the Selenter See. It is a loose remake of the 1937 film Seven Slaps.

== Cast ==
- Curd Jürgens as Thomas Nathan Terbanks
- Gila von Weitershausen as Eva
- Alexandra Stewart as Celestine
- Nadja Tiller as Lady Moore
- Balduin Baas as Vize
- Werner Pochath as Jürgen, Kommunarde
- René Deltgen as Wan Tan, Chinese
- Charles Regnier as Finanzminister
- Horst Keitel as Sozialminister
- Hans Peter Hallwachs as Bingo
- Gert Wiedenhofen

== Bibliography ==
- Bock, Hans-Michael; Bergfelder, Tim, eds. (2009). The Concise Cinegraph: Encyclopaedia of German Cinema. New York: Berghahn Books. ISBN 978-1-57181-655-9.
