= Otto Stoeckel =

German actor

- Born: 6 August 1873; Buttelstedt, German Empire
- Died: 17 November 1958 (aged 85); West Berlin, West Germany
- Occupation: Actor
- Years active: 1921-1958 (film)

Otto Stoeckel (1873–1958) was a German stage and film actor. A character actor, he played a number of supporting roles in German films of the 1930s during the Nazi era. These included propaganda films such as Bismarck (1940). One of his more notable roles as in the 1936 comedy Lucky Kids.

== Selected filmography ==
- There Is Only One Love (1933)
- She and the Three (1935)
- The Man with the Paw (1935)
- Der Kaiser von Kalifornien 1936)
- Family Parade (1936)
- The Dreamer (1936)
- City of Anatol (1936)
- Victoria in Dover (1936)
- Lucky Kids (1936)
- The Glass Ball (1937)
- The Yellow Flag (1937)
- His Best Friend (1937)
- Seven Slaps (1937)
- Secret Mission (1938)
- People Who Travel (1938)
- Napoleon Is to Blame for Everything (1938)
- Five Million Look for an Heir (1938)
- The Impossible Mister Pitt (1938)
- Bismarck (1940)
- The Three Codonas (1940)
- Dog Days (1944)
- Don't Play with Love (1949)
- The Blue Swords (1949)
- Heart of Stone (1950)
- The Mad Bomberg (1957)

== Bibliography ==
- Giesen, Rolf. Nazi Propaganda Films: A History and Filmography. McFarland, 2003.
- Rabinbach, Anson & Gilman, Sander L. (ed.) The Third Reich Sourcebook. University of California Press, 2013.
