= Károly Aszlányi =

Hungarian writer

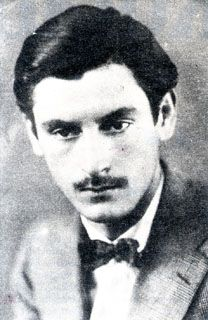
- Aszlányi in 1929
- Born: 22 April 1908; Orșova, Austro-Hungarian Empire
- Died: 8 December 1938 (aged 30); Dorog, Hungary
- Occupation: Writer

Károly Aszlányi (1908–1938) was a Hungarian novelist, playwright and screenwriter. He died in a road accident near Dorog aged thirty. His 1935 novel Seven Slaps was adapted into the 1937 German comedy film of the same title.

== Selected filmography ==
- Seven Slaps (1937)
- Billeting (1938)
- The Lady Is a Bit Cracked (1938)
- Wildflowers of Gyimes (1939)
- Much Ado About Emmi (1940)
- The Perfect Family (1942)
- Slap in the Face (1970)

== Bibliography ==
- Nemeskürty, István & Szántó, Tibor. A Pictorial Guide to the Hungarian Cinema, 1901-1984. Helikon, 1985.
- House, Roy Temple. Books Abroad, Volume 14. University of Oklahoma, 1940.
