= The Love Waltz =

1930 film

- Directed by: Carl Winston
- Written by: Robert Liebmann; Hans Müller
- Produced by: Erich Pommer
- Starring: Lilian Harvey; Georg Alexander; John Batten; Gertrud de Lalsky
- Cinematography: Werner Brandes; Konstantin Irmen-Tschet
- Music by: Werner R. Heymann
- Production company: UFA
- Distributed by: British International Pictures
- Release date: 23 July 1930
- Running time: 98 minutes
- Country: Germany
- Language: English

The Love Waltz is a 1930 German English language musical film directed by Carl Winston and starring Lilian Harvey, Georg Alexander and John Batten. It is the English-language version of Waltz of Love (1930) which also starred Harvey.

Following the introduction of sound films, a large number of multi-language versions (MLVs) were made by UFA to allow its films to reach the lucrative British and American markets. The film was produced by Erich Pommer who took an interest in MLVs. The film was part of a transitional stage in the development of MLVs as they moved from direct translations into more varied products tailored to individual markets.

== Cast ==
- Lilian Harvey as Princess Eva
- Georg Alexander as Grandduke Peter Ferdinand
- John Batten as Bobby Fould
- Gertrud de Lalsky as Grandduchess Melanie
- Karl Ludwig Diehl as Lord Chamberlain
- Hans Junkermann as Fould, Bobby's Father
- Lilian Mower as Duchess zu Lauenburg
- C. Hooper Trask as Dr. Popper
- Mildred Wayne as Dolly

== Bibliography ==
- Bergfelder, Tim; Cargnelli, Christian, eds. (2008). Destination London: German-Speaking Emigrés and British Cinema, 1925–1950. Berghahn Books. ISBN 978-0-85745-019-7.
- Hardt, Ursula (1996). From Caligari to California: Erich Pommer's Life in the International Film Wars. Berghahn Books. ISBN 978-1-57181-930-7.
- Kreimeier, Klaus (1999). The Ufa Story: A History of Germany's Greatest Film Company, 1918–1945. University of California Press. ISBN 978-0-520-22069-0.
