= Black Roses (1935 film) =

1935 film

- Directed by: Paul Martin
- Written by: Curt J. Braun; Walter Supper; Paul Martin
- Produced by: Paul Martin
- Starring: Lilian Harvey; Willy Fritsch; Willy Birgel; Gerhard Bienert
- Cinematography: Werner Krien; Fritz Arno Wagner
- Edited by: Walter Fredersdorf; Johanna Schmidt
- Music by: Kurt Schröder
- Production company: UFA
- Distributed by: UFA
- Release date: 23 December 1935
- Running time: 93 minutes
- Country: Germany
- Language: German

Black Roses (German: Schwarze Rosen) is a 1935 German historical drama film directed by Paul Martin and starring Lilian Harvey, Willy Fritsch and Willy Birgel. A separate English-language version Black Roses was also made with Harvey reprising her role opposite Esmond Knight. She also starred in a French version. The film was Harvey's comeback in German cinema, following her attempts to find enduring success in Hollywood and then in British films. One source suggested that Harvey paid for the English version of the film to be made out of her own money, as she still hoped to break into the English-speaking market.

The film was popular in Germany, partly because it re-teamed Harvey with Fritsch who was constantly romantically linked with her in the media. In fact Harvey was in a long-term relationship with the film's director Paul Martin. Despite the film's success, Harvey quickly moved away from melodrama to the lighter comedy romances that had originally made her name.

It was shot at the Babelsberg Studios in Berlin with location shooting around Harburg a borough of Hamburg. The film's sets were designed by the art directors Erich Kettelhut and Max Mellin. The premiere took place at the Gloria-Palast.

== Synopsis ==
When Finland was still part of the Russian Empire, a Finnish Revolutionary battling Czarist agents is assisted by Russian dancer Tania Fedorovna, who eventually gives her life for her lover.

== Partial cast ==
- Lilian Harvey as Tania Fedorovna
- Willy Fritsch as Erkki Collin
- Willy Birgel as Fürst Abarow
- Gerhard Bienert as Niklander
- Gertrud Wolle as Die Wirtschafterin
- Klaus Pohl as Polizeiagent
- Heinz Wemper as Kosak Iwanoff
- Franz Klebusch as Fischer
- Ullrich Klein as Offizier
- Kurt von Ruffin as 1. Adjutant
- Hermann Frick as 2. Adjutant

== Reception ==
The Österreichische Film-Zeitung reported in its edition of December 27, 1935: "Paul Martin staged the film, which is rich in gripping scenes and whose exciting plot is well structured, with a great deal of sensitivity for what is cinematically effective. Scenes of oppressive drama are delightfully staged, or ballet pictures full of grace."

Paimann's Filmlisten found: "The plot slows down a bit after an excellent start, but increases noticeably towards the end. It has its most essential support in the leading couple. The dialogue is sparse, apt and is underlined by shot-rich camera work. Schröder's music is used with moderation, the presentation ... authentic (turn of the century)...".

== Bibliography ==
- Ascheid, Antje (2010) [2003]. Hitler's Heroines: Stardom and Womanhood in Nazi Cinema. Philadelphia: Temple University Press. ISBN 978-1-59213-843-2.
- Bergfelder, Tim; Cargnelli, Christian, eds. (2008). Destination London: German-Speaking Emigrés and British Cinema, 1925–1950. New York: Berghahn Books. ISBN 978-0-85745-019-7.
