= The Temporary Widow =

1930 film

- Directed by: Gustav Ucicky
- Written by: Karl Hartl; Walter Reisch; Benn Levy
- Based on: Hokuspokus; 1926 play by Curt Goetz
- Produced by: Erich Pommer; Günther Stapenhorst
- Starring: Lilian Harvey; Laurence Olivier; Athole Stewart
- Cinematography: Carl Hoffmann
- Music by: Robert Stolz
- Production company: UFA
- Distributed by: Wardour Films
- Release date: 15 November 1930
- Running time: 84 minutes
- Countries: United Kingdom; Germany
- Language: English

The Temporary Widow is a 1930 British-German comedy film, an English-language parallel version directed by Gustav Ucicky and starring Anglo-German actress and singer Lilian Harvey, Laurence Olivier in his first film role, and Athole Stewart.

After unsuccessful painter Paul Kellermann has disappeared, interest in his paintings rises, until his soft-spoken widow Kitty Kellermann is accused of murdering her husband by drowning him in a lake. A mysterious person warns the court president Grandt that somebody wants to kill him, and he sends a telegram to his friend and lawyer to come for support. The night before the court session that likely will sentence her, a surprise visitor shows up at night and seemingly provides ample evidence that his friend and lawyer, knowing about the terms in the testament, has the intention to take advantage of that, having bought a ticket well before he received the telegram. After making his point that things are not always as they may seem, as simple sleight of hand "hocus-pocus" tricks and a forged date on a ticket apparently had convinced the judge within minutes that his long-term friend has evil intentions, the visitor declares that he is Peter Bille, a former circus artist, illusionist, speed painter, trick shooter, escape artist, and jurist, and that he will defend poor and innocent Mrs. Kellermann because her lawyer has stepped down.

The film sets were designed by the art directors Robert Herlth and Walter Röhrig. Both films versions were shot at the Babelsberg Studios.

The films were based on the play Hokuspokus written in 1926 by Curt Goetz, but use different role names, e.g. Kitty Kellermann instead of the original Scandinavian-sounding names Agda and Hilmar Kjerulf (Hjalmar Kjerulf was a painter who died in 1846 in Germany). The German language version Hokuspokus was made at the same time starring Willy Fritsch, the English-language version was given a differing title though, referring to one of the paintings brought in as exhibit. After the war, director Kurt Hoffmann filmed two further versions in 1953 (starring Curt Goetz himself alongside his wife), and in 1966 in color.

== Cast ==
- Lilian Harvey as Kitty Kellermann
- Laurence Olivier as Peter Bille
- Athole Stewart as President of the Court of Justice
- Gillian Dean as Witness Anny Sedal
- Frank Stanmore as Witness Kulicke
- Felix Aylmer as Public Prosecutor
- Frederick Lloyd as Counsel for the Defense
- Henry Caine as Councillor Lindberg
