= Castles in the Air (1939 film) =

1939 film directed by Augusto Genina

- Directed by: Augusto Genina
- Written by: Franz Karl Franchy (novel); Renato Castellani; Alessandro De Stefani; Mario Soldati; Franz Tanzler; Augusto Genina
- Produced by: C.O. Barbieri
- Starring: Lilian Harvey; Vittorio De Sica; Otto Treßler; Hilde von Stolz
- Cinematography: Günther Anders; Konstantin Irmen-Tschet
- Edited by: Waldemar Gaede; Fernando Tropea
- Music by: Alessandro Cicognini
- Production company: Astra Film
- Distributed by: Generalcine (Italy); UFA (Germany)
- Release date: 19 March 1939
- Running time: 96 minutes
- Country: Italy
- Language: Italian

Castles in the Air (Italian: Castelli in aria) is a 1939 Italian "white-telephones" comedy film directed by Augusto Genina and starring Lilian Harvey, Vittorio De Sica and Otto Treßler. It was made at Cinecittà in Rome, as part of a co-production with Germany. A separate German-language version was also released. It is based on a novel by Franz Karl Franchy.

== Synopsis ==
A wardrobe mistress at a Vienna theatre wins a competition, receiving as her prize a luxury tour round Italy. On the train she meets an impoverished young Italian who pretends to be a prince.

== Partial cast ==
- Lilian Harvey as Annie Wagner detta 'Mimì'
- Vittorio De Sica as Riccardo Pietramola
- Otto Treßler as Forster
- Hilde von Stolz as La cantante
- Fritz Odemar as Walter
- Carla Sveva as La guardarobiera
- Umberto Sacripante as Il gondoliere

== Bibliography ==
- Moliterno, Gino. The A to Z of Italian Cinema. Scarecrow Press, 2009.
