= Waltz of Love =

1930 film

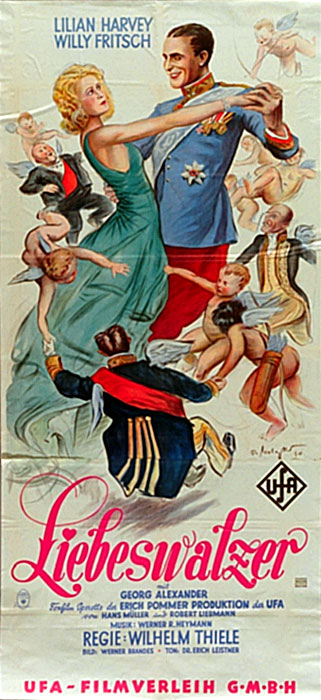
- Movie poster
- Directed by: Wilhelm Thiele
- Written by: Robert Liebmann; Hans Müller
- Produced by: Erich Pommer
- Starring: Lilian Harvey; Willy Fritsch; Georg Alexander; Julia Serda
- Cinematography: Werner Brandes; Konstantin Irmen-Tschet
- Music by: Werner R. Heymann
- Production company: UFA
- Distributed by: UFA
- Release date: 7 February 1930
- Running time: 98 minutes
- Country: Germany
- Language: German

Waltz of Love (German: Liebeswalzer) is a 1930 German musical film directed by Wilhelm Thiele and starring Lilian Harvey, Willy Fritsch and Georg Alexander. It was shot at the Babelsberg Studios in Berlin with sets designed by the art director Erich Kettelhut. It premiered at the Gloria-Palast in Berlin on 7 February 1930. A separate English language version The Love Waltz was also produced.

== Cast ==
- Lilian Harvey as Princess Eva
- Willy Fritsch as Bobby Fould
- Georg Alexander as Archduke Peter Ferdinand
- Julia Serda as Duchess of Lauenburg
- Karl Ludwig Diehl as Marshal
- Hans Junkermann as Fould
- Lotte Spira as Archduchess Melany
- Viktor Schwanneke as Dr. Lemke
- Karl Etlinger as Dr. Popper

== Bibliography ==
- Bergfelder, Tim & Cargnelli, Christian. Destination London: German-speaking emigrés and British cinema, 1925-1950. Berghahn Books, 2008.
- Hardt, Ursula. From Caligari to California: Erich Pommer's life in the International Film Wars. Berghahn Books, 1996.
- Kreimeier, Klaus. The Ufa Story: A History of Germany's Greatest Film Company, 1918-1945. University of California Press, 1999.
