= Lucky Kids =

1936 film directed by Paul Martin

- Directed by: Paul Martin
- Written by: Curt Goetz; Paul Martin; Robert A. Stemmle
- Based on: Glückskinder by Thyra Samter Winslow and Brian Marlow
- Produced by: Max Pfeiffer
- Starring: Lilian Harvey; Willy Fritsch; Paul Kemp
- Cinematography: Konstantin Irmen-Tschet
- Edited by: Carl Otto Bartning
- Music by: Peter Kreuder
- Production company: UFA
- Distributed by: UFA
- Release date: 19 August 1936
- Running time: 93 minutes
- Country: Germany
- Language: German

Lucky Kids (German: Glückskinder) is a 1936 German romantic comedy film directed by Paul Martin and starring Lilian Harvey, Willy Fritsch, and Paul Kemp. It was shot at the Babelsberg Studios in Berlin. The film's sets were designed by the art director Erich Kettelhut.

== Plot ==
New York City in the 1930s: When the court reporter of the Morning Post gets drunk, his colleagues persuade the naive and unsuccessful newspaper poet Gil Taylor to write the court report instead. The case concerns an indigent girl accused of vagrancy, a charge which could result in a prison sentence. The romantic Gil has pity with the attractive girl and testifies on her behalf that he is her fiancée, but the judge remains skeptical and arranges for the two to get married on the spot in order to prove that they are really a couple. Gil and the girl, complete strangers to one another, agree.

The next day, every newspaper reports about the sensational marriage - except the Morning Post, because Gil forgot to write the report in his excitement. The editor Manning fires him along with two of his colleagues who stand up for him. Gil is now married with a girl who calls herself "Ann" but declines to reveal her true identity. A misunderstanding leads the three ex-journalists to believe that his wife is the abducted niece of the oil tycoon Jackson. After a series of humorous events, Gil eventually gets his job back, and he and Ann finally fall in love.

== Cast ==
- Lilian Harvey as Ann Garden / Jackson's Niece Molly
- Willy Fritsch as Gil Taylor
- Paul Kemp as Frank Black, Reporter
- Oskar Sima as Stoddard, Reporter
- Fred Goebel as Bill, Reporter
- Erich Kestin as Hopkins, drunken Reporter
- Otto Stoeckel as Manning, Editor of the Morning Post
- Paul Bildt as Judge
- Albert Florath as Jackson, Oil Tycoon
- Thomas Cziruchin]as Brown, The Boxer
- Max Hiller as Justice Of The Peace

== Background ==
The film was supposed to be a German take on the American genre of Screwball comedy film. The film was written by Curt Goetz, one of Germany's leading playwrights, and starred Lilian Harvey and Willy Fritsch (they made twelve films together and were considered the leading German film couple of the 1930s). The film proved to be very popular with critics and audiences. It is considered to be "one of the few comedies of German film, which do not only copy their role model, the American screwball comedy, but are also able to compete with their best representatives".

The song "Ich wollt‘ ich wär‘ ein Huhn" ("I wish I was a chicken") by Peter Kreuder, sung in the film, is still well known in Germany, also in the version sung by the Comedian Harmonists.

== In popular culture ==
In Quentin Tarantino's 2009 film Inglourious Basterds, the song "Ich wollt' ich wär ein Huhn" can be heard playing on a phonograph in the basement scene "La Louisiane" as well as in the extended scene "Lunch With Goebbels", as Joseph Goebbels (Sylvester Groth) happily sings a portion of the song after deciding to hold a private screening of the film. After the screening, cinema owner Shosanna Dreyfus (Mélanie Laurent), under the alias "Emmanuelle Mimieux", comments on liking Lilian Harvey in the film—to which an irritated Goebbels angrily insists her name never be mentioned again in his presence (Harvey hated the Nazis and left Germany in 1939).

== Bibliography ==
- Ascheid, Antje (2003). Hitler's Heroines: Stardom and Womanhood in Nazi Cinema. Philadelphia: Temple University Press. ISBN 978-1-56639-984-5.
