= Love and Trumpets (1925 film) =

1925 film directed by Richard Eichberg

- Directed by: Richard Eichberg
- Written by: Hans Backwitz; Hans Sturm
- Produced by: Richard Eichberg
- Starring: Lilian Harvey; Harry Liedtke; Harry Halm
- Cinematography: Erich Grimmler; Willy Hameister
- Production company: Richard Eichberg-Film
- Distributed by: Süd-Film
- Release date: 14 August 1925
- Country: Germany
- Languages: Silent; German intertitles

Love and Trumpets (German: Liebe und Trompetenblasen) is a 1925 German silent comedy film directed by Richard Eichberg and starring Lilian Harvey, Harry Liedtke, and Harry Halm. It was shot at the Johannisthal Studios in Berlin. The film's sets were designed by the art director Kurt Richter.

== Cast ==
- Lilian Harvey as Komtesse Maria Charlotte
- Harry Liedtke as Rittmeister Ottokar, Reichsgraf von Eppenstein
- Harry Halm as Leutnant Karl, Edler von Eppenstein
- Fritz Spira as Erzherzog Leopold
- Mary Kid as Josefa von Pokorny
- Hugo Flink as Baron Prechtl, Adjutant des Erzherzogs
- Hans Junkermann as Major Frosch von Fröschen
- Paul Morgan as Fliegenbein, sein Bursche
- Peter Voß as Rekrut Dirmoser
- Ellen Plessow as Amalie Spießlein, Kammerfrau

== Bibliography ==
- Bock, Hans-Michael; Bergfelder, Tim, eds. (2009). The Concise Cinegraph: Encyclopaedia of German Cinema. New York: Berghahn Books. ISBN 978-1-57181-655-9.
