= Hitler's Heroines =

2003 book about Nazi cinema by Antje Ascheid

Hitler's Heroines: Stardom and Womanhood in Nazi Cinema
- Author: Antje Ascheid
- Language: English
- Genre: Non-fiction
- Publisher: Temple University Press
- Publication date: 2003
- Publication place: United States

Hitler's Heroines: Stardom and Womanhood in Nazi Cinema is a 2003 book written by Antje Ascheid and published by Temple University Press.

The book examines the portrayal of women in Nazi Germany by exploring how actresses embodied and challenged the regime's ideals of femininity, motherhood, and German nationalism. In analyzing key films and actresses, Hitler's Heroines highlights the contradictions of restrictive expectations placed on women and the glamorous stardom of many actresses whose roles contributed to national propaganda efforts. Ascheid suggests that, although the Nazi regime officially rejected the cult of stardom, female movie stars were integral to the mass appeal of Nazi ideology and cultural control.
