= Georges Ohnet =

French novelist (1848–1918)

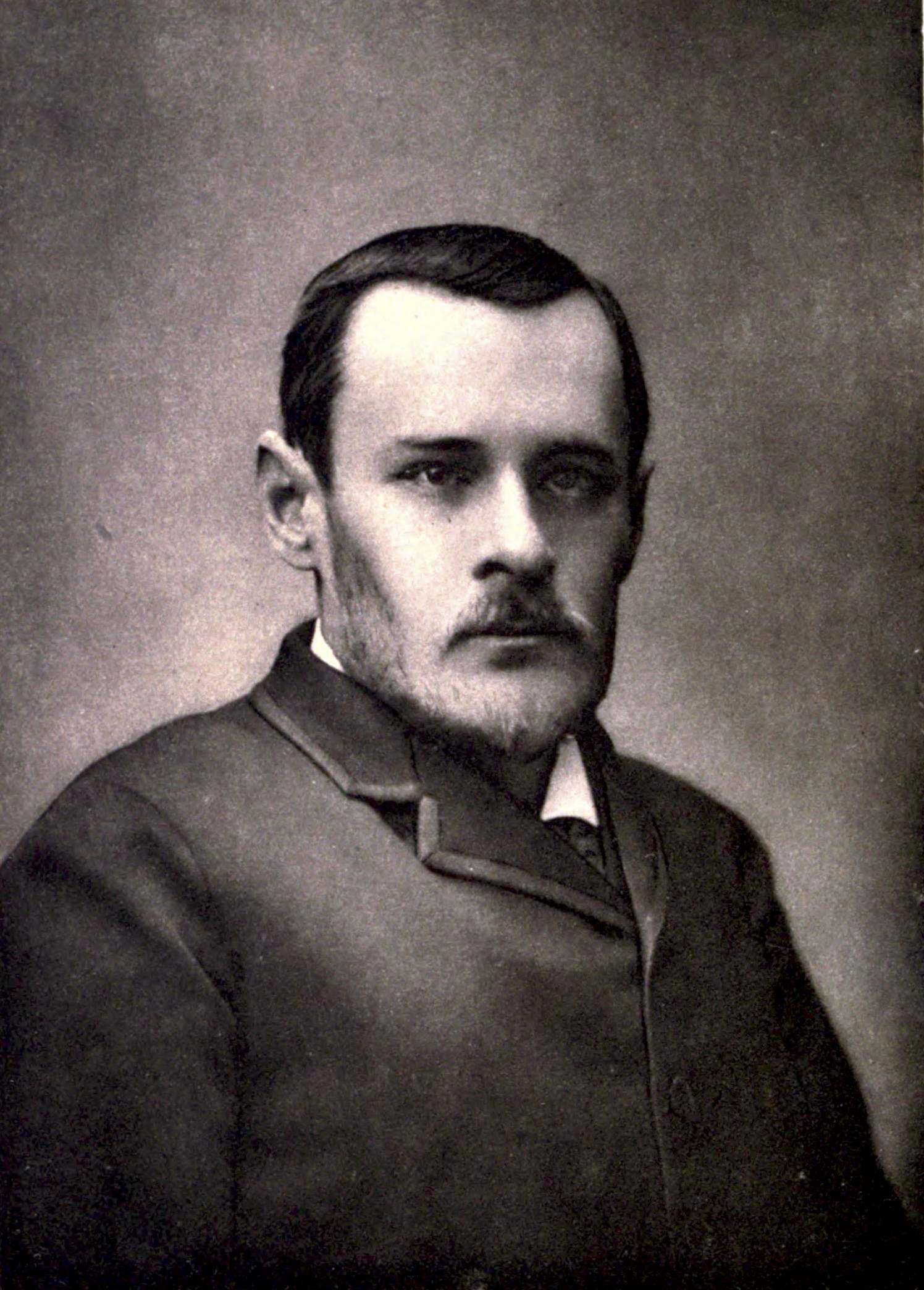
Georges Ohnet (c.1905)

Georges Ohnet (3 April 1848, in Paris – 5 May 1918) was a French novelist.

== Life and career ==
Ohnet was educated at the Collège Sainte-Barbe and the Lycée Napoléon. After the Franco-Prussian War he became editor of the magazines Pays and Constitutionnel in succession. In collaboration with the engineer and dramatist Louis Denayrouze (b. 1848) he produced the play Regina Sarpi, and during 1877 Marthe.

Ohnet was an admirer of George Sand and was opposed to realistic modern novels. He began a series of novels, Les Batailles de la vie, of a character simple and idealistic, which, although scorned by the critics as unreal and commonplace, were very popular. The series included the novels Serge Panine (1881) which was awarded by the academy; Le Maître de forges (1882), La Grande Marnière (1885), Volonté (1888), and Dernier Amour (1891). Many of his novels have been dramatized with great success, Le Maître de forges, produced at the Gymnase during 1883, being played for an entire year. His later publications include Le Crépuscule (1902), Le Marchand de Poison (1903), La Conquérante (1905), La dixième muse (1906), La Route Rouge (1908), and La Serre de l'Aigle (1912). His last work was Journal d'un Bourgeois de Paris Pendant la Guerre de 1914 (1914). In 1902 he was elected president of the Société des Auteurs et Compositeurs Dramatiques.

== Style ==
Ohnet's understanding of his readership helped him devise the passionate style for which he became famous. He disdained the romantic melodrama motif, choosing instead to explore complex passion. His literary genius was in being able to introduce originality into a genre so greatly archetypal as the romantic melodrama. It was this quality that made him one of the most widely read authors of his time.

== Works ==
Ohnet's magnum opus was the novel Le Maître de forges (The Master Of The Forges, 1882). The book became an instant success, finding wide acceptance not only among French readers but also readers in other parts of Europe. Soon after its publication, it was translated into Spanish by the Filipino writer Codorníu Julia.

Ohnet enjoyed success with his other works too. Countess Sarah (1882), Lise Fleuron (1884), The Ladies of Croix-Mort (1886), Will (1888), Dr. Rameau (1889), Serge Panine (1890) and At The Bottom of The Abyss (1899), the last of these regarded commonly as one of his best works.

== Filmography ==
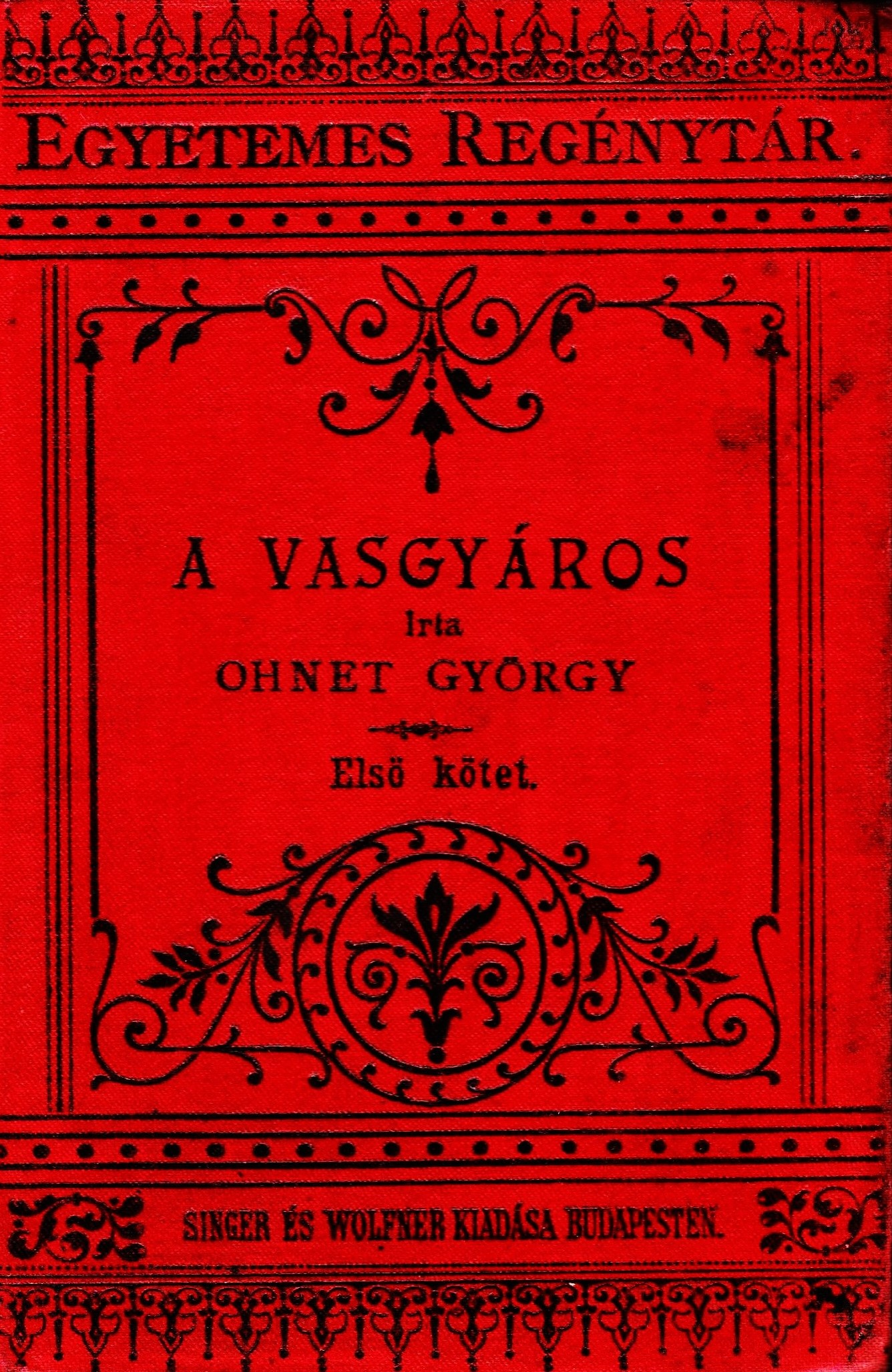
Le Maître de forges (Hungarian edition, 1890s)

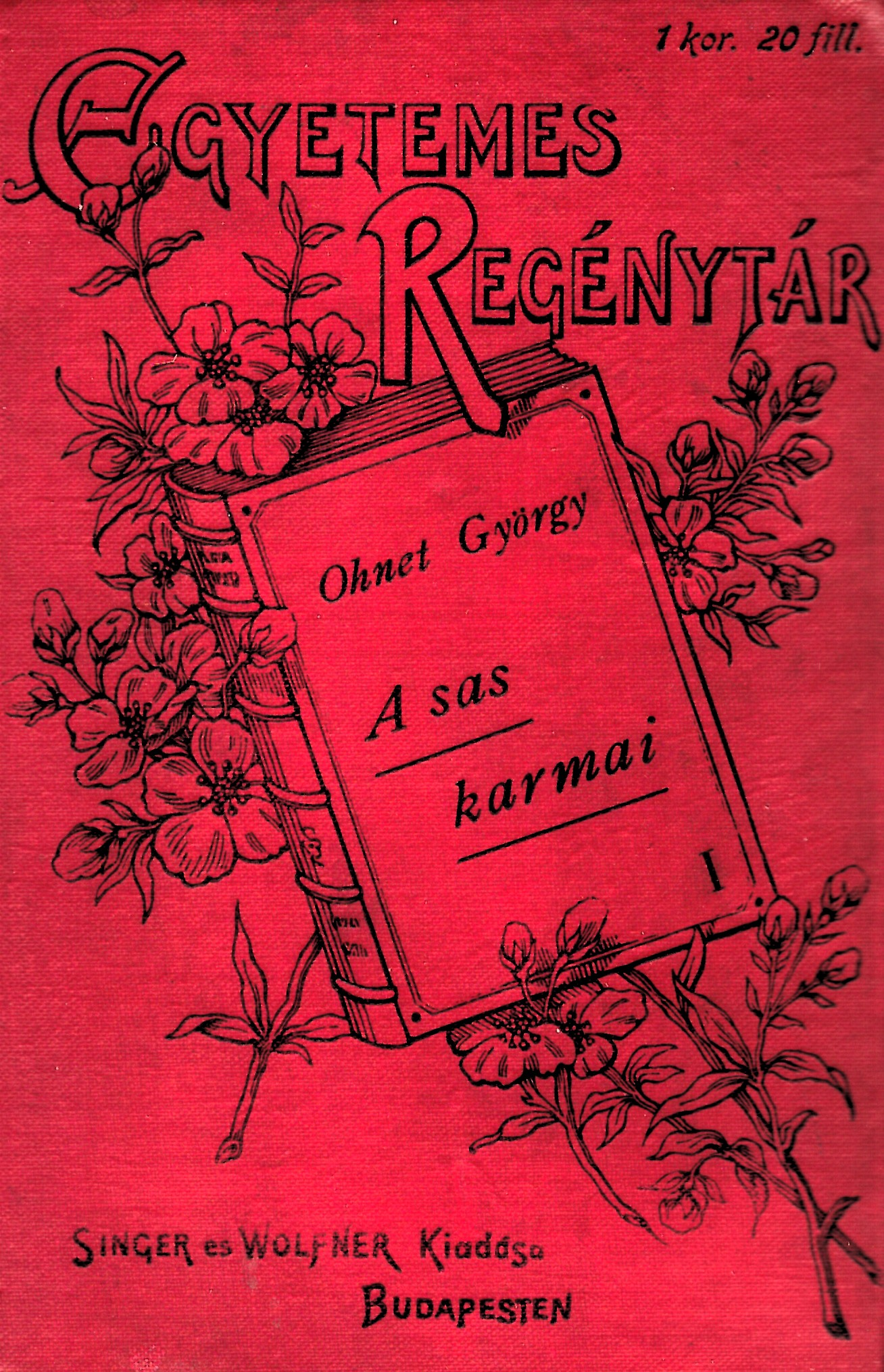
La serre de l'Aigle (Hungarian edition, 1913)

- Le Maître de forges, directed by Henri Pouctal (France, 1912, short movie, based on the novel Le Maître de forges).
- La Grande Marnière, directed by Henri Pouctal (France, 1912, based on the novel La Grande Marnière).
- The Iron Master, directed by Travers Vale (1914, short movie, based on the novel Le Maître de forges).
- Dr. Rameau, directed by Will S. Davis (1915, based on the novel Le Docteur Rameau).
- Dette de haine, directed by Henri Pouctal (France, 1915, based on the novel Dette de haine).
- Le Droit de l'enfant, directed by Henri Pouctal (France, 1916, based on the novel Le Droit de l'enfant).
- A Life for a Life, directed by Yevgeni Bauer (Russia, 1916, based on the novel Serge Panine).
- Nemrod et Cie, directed by Maurice Mariaud (France, 1916, based on the novel Nemrod et Cie).
- Les Dames de Croix-Mort, directed by Maurice Mariaud (France, 1916, based on the novel Les Dames de Croix-Mort).
- Volonté, directed by Henri Pouctal (France, 1917, based on the novel Volonté).
- American Methods, directed by Frank Lloyd (1917, based on the novel Le Maître de forges).
- The King of Paris, directed by Yevgeni Bauer (Russia, 1917, based on the novel Le Roi de Paris).
- L'Âme de Pierre, directed by Charles Burguet (France, 1918, based on the novel L'Âme de Pierre).
- Nel rifugio, directed by Ubaldo Pittei (Italy, 1919, based on a novel).
- The Railway Owner, directed by Eugenio Perego (Italy, 1919, based on the novel Le Maître de forges).
- Countess Sarah, directed by Roberto Roberti (Italy, 1919, based on the novel La comtesse Sarah).
- La Dame en gris, directed by Gianpaolo Rosmino (Italy, 1919, based on the novel La Dame en gris).
- Debito d'odio, directed by Augusto Genina (Italy, 1920, based on the novel Dette de haine).
- Lisa Fleuron, directed by Roberto Roberti (Italy, 1920, based on the novel Lise Fleuron).
- La grande marniera, directed by Gero Zambuto (Italy, 1920, based on the novel La Grande Marnière).
- Serge Panine, directed by Maurice de Marsan and Charles Maudru (France, 1922, based on the novel Serge Panine).
- My Friend the Devil, directed by Harry F. Millarde (1922, based on the novel Le Docteur Rameau).
- The King of Paris, directed by Maurice de Marsan and Charles Maudru (France, 1923, based on the novel Le Roi de Paris).
- L'Âme de Pierre, directed by Gaston Roudès (France, 1929, based on the novel L'Âme de Pierre).
- Heilige oder Dirne, directed by Martin Berger (Germany, 1929, based on a play).
- The King of Paris, directed by Leo Mittler (Germany, 1931, based on the novel Le Roi de Paris).
  - The King of Paris, directed by Leo Mittler (France, 1931, based on the novel Le Roi de Paris).
- The Iron Master, directed by Chester M. Franklin (1932, based on the novel Le Maître de forges).
- The Ironmaster, directed by Fernand Rivers and Abel Gance (France, 1933, based on the novel Le Maître de forges).
- Serge Panine, directed by Charles Méré and Paul Schiller (France, 1939, based on the novel Serge Panine).
- La Grande Marnière, directed by Jean de Marguenat (France, 1943, based on the novel La Grande Marnière).
- Felipe Derblay, el herrero, directed by Ramón Pereda (Mexico, 1944, based on the novel Le Maître de forges).
- The Ironmaster, directed by Fernand Rivers (France, 1948, based on the novel Le Maître de forges)
- Last Love, directed by Jean Stelli (France, 1949, based on the novel Dernier Amour).
- Le Droit de l'enfant, directed by Jacques Daroy (France, 1949, based on the novel Le Droit de l'enfant).
- Il padrone delle ferriere, directed by Anton Giulio Majano (Italy, 1959, based on the novel Le Maître de forges).
- Tamirci Parçası, directed by Türker İnanoğlu and Aram Gülyüz (Turkey, 1965, based on the novel Le Maître de forges).
