= List of French films of 1929 =

French films released in 1929

A list of films produced in France in 1929:

| Title | Director | Cast | Genre | Notes |
|---|---|---|---|---|
| Baccarat | Adelqui Migliar | Ica von Lenkeffy, Suzanne Delmas, Elmire Vautier | Comedy | |
| The Best Mistress | René Hervil | Sandra Milovanoff, Félicien Tramel, Danièle Parola | Comedy | |
| Boul se met au verre | Claude Autant-Lara | Charles Frank, Vera Wanda | | |
| Cagliostro | Richard Oswald | Hans Stüwe, Renée Héribel | Drama | Co-production with Germany |
| Captain Fracasse | Alberto Cavalcanti, Henry Wulschleger | Pierre Blanchar, Lien Deyers, Charles Boyer | Adventure | |
| Ces dames aux chapeaux verts | André Berthomieu | Gabrielle Fontan, Rene Lefevre | | |
| Chacun porte sa croix | Jean Choux | Georges Oltramere, Lilian Constantini | | |
| Construire in feu | Claude Autant-Lara | Jose Davert, Jean Leclercq | | |
| The Crime of Sylvestre Bonnard | André Berthomieu | Thérèse Kolb, Charles Lamy | Drama | |
| Dans la nuit | Charles Vanel | | | |
| Deux balles au cœur | Jean Milva, Claude Heymann | Lily Fevrier, Jack Trevor | | |
| Distress | Jean Durand | Philippe Hériat, Alice Roberts | Silent | |
| The Divine Voyage | Julien Duvivier | Jean Murat, Thomy Bourdelle | Silent | |
| Dolly | Pierre Colombier | Dolly Davis, André Roanne, Paul Ollivier | Comedy | |
| Espionage | Jean Choux | Lilian Constantini, Thérèse Reignier | Spy drama | |
| Étude cinégraphique sur une arabesque | Germaine Dulac | | | |
| Fécondité | Henri Etiévant | | Drama | |
| Figaro | Tony Lekain, Gaston Ravel | Arlette Marchal, Marie Bell | Historical | |
| Finis Terræ | Jean Epstein | Jean-Marie Laot, Ambroise Rouzic | Drama | |
| A Foolish Maiden | Luitz-Morat | Emmy Lynn, Jean Angelo, Suzy Vernon | Comedy | |
| Gros sur le cœur | Pierre Wiell | | | |
| House in the Sun | Gaston Roudès | France Dhélia, Gaston Jacquet, Georges Melchior | Silent | |
| An Ideal Woman | Jean Durand | Arlette Marchal, Charles Vanel | Silent | |
| Illusions | Lucien Mayrargues | | | |
| Island of Love | Jean Durand, Berthe Dagmar | Claude France, Pierre Batcheff | Silent | |
| Jeux de dames | Robert Land | | | |
| Kiss Me | Robert Péguy | Charles Prince, Suzanne Bianchetti | Comedy | |
| L'appassionata | Léon Mathot, André Liabel | Fernand Fabre, Renée Héribel | | |
| L'Arpète | Donatien | Lucienne Legrand, Louis Ravet | | |
| L'Escale | Jean Gourguet | Ginette Maddie, Rene Forte | | |
| L’instinct | Léon Mathot, André Liabel | Madeleine Carroll, Léon Mathot | | |
| La dame de bronze et le monsieur de cristal | Marcel Manchez | | | |
| La Divine croisière | Julien Duvivier | Jean Murat, Suzanne Christy | Drama | |
| La maison des hommes vivants | Marcel Dumont | Rudolf Klein-Rogge, Simone Vaudry | | |
| La merveilleuse vie de Jeanne d'Arc fille de Lorraine | Marco De Gastyne | Jean Debucourt, Philippe Hériat | Biopic | |
| Montparnasse | Eugène Deslaw | | Documentary | |
| La Possession | Léonce Perret | Francesca Bertini, Jeanne Aubert | Silent | |
| La Vie merveilleuse Bernadette | Georges Pallu | Alexandra, Paul Ceriani | Documentary | |
| La Vie miraculeuse de Thérèse Martin | Julien Duvivier | Simone Bourday, Andre Marnay | Biopic | |
| Le Bled | Jean Renoir | Jackie Monnier, Enrique Riveros, Alexandre Arquillière | Comedy drama | |
| Le mystère de la Villa Rose | Louis Mercanton, René Hervil | Léon Mathot, Simone Vaudry | Mystery | |
| Le Petit chaperon rouge | Alberto Cavalcanti | Pola Illéry, Alberto Cavalcanti | Fantasy | |
| Les Mystères du Château de Dé | Man Ray | Man Ray, Georges Auric | | |
| Les taciturnes | Jacques de Casembroot | | | |
| Les trois masques | André Hugon | Renée Héribel, Jean Toulout | | |
| The Lighthouse Keepers | Jean Grémillon | Geymond Vital, Genica Athanasiou | Drama | |
| The Man Without Love | Guido Brignone | Gustav Diessl, Ágnes Eszterházy | Drama | Co-production with Germany |
| Maman Colibri | Julien Duvivier | Maria Jacobini, Francis Lederer | Drama | |
| Monte Cristo | Henri Fescourt | Jean Angelo, Lil Dagover | Adventure | |
| The New Gentlemen | Jacques Feyder | Gaby Morlay, Albert Préjean | Comedy | |
| Nogent, Eldorado du dimanche | Marcel Carné, Michel Sanvoisin | | | |
| Nuits de princes | Marcel L'Herbier | Gina Manès, Jacques Catelain | | |
| The Queen's Necklace | Gaston Ravel | Marcelle Chantal, Georges Lannes, Diana Karenne | Historical | |
| Rapacité | André Berthomieu | Rene Lefevre, Gaston Jacquet | | |
| Saint Joan the Maid | Marco de Gastyne | Simone Genevois, Fernand Mailly | Historical | Co-production with Germany |
| Temptation | René Barberis, René Leprince | Lucien Dalsace, Fernand Mailly | Silent | |
| Un chien andalou | Luis Buñuel | Simone Mareuil, Pierre Batcheff | Surrealist | |
| Une femme a menti | Charles de Rochefort | | | |
| The Veil Dancer | Charles Burguet | René Navarre, Hans Albers | Silent | Co-production with Germany |
| The Wedding March | André Hugon | Pierre Blanchar, Louise Lagrange | Comedy | |
| The Woman and the Puppet | Jacques de Baroncelli | Conchita Montenegro, Léo Joannon | Drama | |
| The Wonderful Day | René Barberis | Dolly Davis, André Roanne | Comedy | |

== See also ==
- 1929 in France
