= The Ironmaster =

The Ironmaster may refer to:

- The Ironmaster (novel), a novel by Georges Ohnet
- The Ironmaster (1933 film), a French drama film
- The Ironmaster (1948 film), a French drama film
- The Iron Master, a 1933 American drama film
- Ironmaster (film), a 1983 Italian-French film
