= The King of Paris =

The King of Paris may refer to:

- The King of Paris (1917 film)
- The King of Paris (1923 film)
- The King of Paris (1930 French-language film)
- The King of Paris (1930 German film)
- The King of Paris (1934 film)
