= Serge Panine =

Serge Panine may refer to:

- Serge Panine (novel), a work by the French writer Georges Ohnet
- Serge Panine (1913 film), a French silent film
- Serge Panine (1915 film), an American silent film
- Serge Panine (1922 film), an Austrian-French silent film
- Serge Panine (1939 film), a French film
