= Pierre Batcheff =

French actor

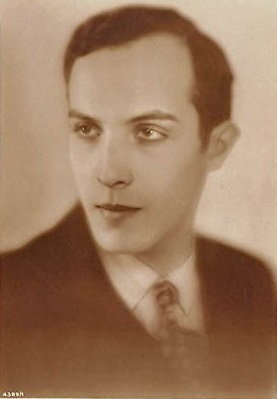
- Batcheff c. 1926
- Born: 23 June 1901? Harbin, Great Qing
- Died: 13 April 1932; Paris, French Third Republic
- Other names: Benjamin Batcheff; Piotr Bachev; Пётр Бачев
- Years active: 1923–1932
- Notable work: Un chien andalou
- Spouse: Denise Piazza

Pierre Batcheff (Russian: Пьер Батчефф; 23 June 1901? – 13 April 1932) was a French actor of Russian origin. He became a popular film actor from the mid-1920s until the early 1930s, and among his best-known work was the surrealist short film Un chien andalou (1929), made by Luis Buñuel in collaboration with Salvador Dalí. After appearing in about twenty-five films, he died at an early age from a drug overdose.

== Life ==
Pierre Batcheff was born in Harbin in China and he grew up in Saint Petersburg. (One source says that his birth name was Benjamin Batcheff and that he adopted the name Pierre later from his father.) When war broke out in 1914, his family were on holiday in Switzerland and they decided to remain there, at first in Lausanne and then Geneva. Batcheff's father went bankrupt around 1917, leaving the family in financial difficulty, and Pierre started taking small parts in Georges Pitoëff's theatre company in Geneva. Between 1919 and 1921 he attended the Collège Calvin. In 1921, Batcheff moved with his family to Paris where he worked at first as a theatre actor.

Batcheff's earliest leading role in the cinema was in 1923 in Claudine et le poussin, in the first of several performances as a young aristocratic lover. In the next few years he made films with Marcel L'Herbier, Jean Epstein, and Abel Gance. By 1927 he was established as a popular young leading man, with interviews and covers photos in film magazines. He was at the same time dissatisfied with the type of roles which he was offered and he cultivated links with avant-garde circles, especially the surrealists. In 1927 he met Luis Buñuel and their discussions led to their subsequent collaboration on Un chien andalou in the following year.

In 1926 Batcheff met Denise Piazza, the daughter of a publisher, and they married in 1930. As Denise Batcheff, and later Denise Tual, she became a film editor and producer.

In the ten years of his film career, Batcheff made around 25 films. At the time of his death, he was engaged in a project with Jacques Prévert to write and direct a film which proved to be sufficiently radical to alarm some financial backers. Batcheff's behaviour showed signs of stress and became increasingly erratic, and in April 1932 he died from an overdose of drugs, possibly by suicide.

One of the Parisian newspapers reporting on his death summarised his contemporary appeal as an actor: "As an artist, he brought an extremely personal tone of refinement, of sensitivity and of melancholy, which was not devoid of strength, and this earned him a very wide popularity". It also noted that on the day after his death he had been due to sign a contract with a producer to direct his first film.

== Filmography ==
Year	Original title	English title	Director	Notes
1923	Le Roi de Paris	The King of Paris	Maurice de Marsan and Charles Maudru	Lost film.
1924	Claudine et le poussin		Marcel Manchez	Role of Claude de Puygiron
1925	Princesse Lulu	Princess Lulu	Émile-Bernard Donatien	Lost film.
1925	Autour d'un berceau		Georges Monca and Maurice Kéroul	Lost film.
1925	Le Double Amour		Jean Epstein	
1926	Feu Mathias Pascal	The Late Matthias Pascal	Marcel L'Herbier	Role of Scipion.
1926	Destinée		Henry Roussel	Lost film.
1926	Le Secret d'une mère		Georges Pallu	Lost film.
1927	Le Joueur d'échecs	The Chess Player	Raymond Bernard	Role of Prince Serge Oblonoff.
1927	Napoléon		Abel Gance	Role of General Hoche.
1927	Éducation de prince	Education of a Prince	Henri Diamant-Berger	
1927	En rade		Alberto Cavalcanti	
1927	La Siréne des tropiques	Siren of the Tropics	Mario Nalpas and Henri Étiévant	With Josephine Baker.
1928	Le Bonheur du jour		Gaston Ravel	Lost film.
1928	L'Île d'amour	Island of Love	Jean Durand and Berthe Dagmar	
1928	Vivre		Robert Boudrioz	Lost film.
1928	Le Perroquet vert		Jean Milva	
1929	Les Deux Timides	Two Timid Souls	René Clair	
1929	Un chien andalou	An Andalusian Dog	Luis Buñuel	Short film.
1929	Monte Cristo		Henri Fescourt	Role of Albert de Mortcerf.
1930	Illusions		Lucien Mayrargue	
1930	Le Roi de Paris	The King of Paris	Leo Mittler	Lost film.
1931	Les Amours de minuit	The Lovers of Midnight	Augusto Genina and Marc Allégret	Also in German version Mitternachtsliebe.
1931	Le Rebelle	The Rebel	Adelqui Migliar	Lost film.
1932	Baroud	Baroud	Rex Ingram and Alice Terry	Batcheff appeared in both French and English versions.
1932	Amour... Amour...		Robert Bibal	Batcheff wrote the script only; filmed and released after his death.

== Bibliography ==
- Powrie, Phil; Rebillard, Éric (2009). Pierre Batcheff and stardom in 1920s French cinema. Edinburgh University Press.
- Tual, Denise (1987). Au cœur du temps. Paris: Carrère.
