= The Ironmaster (novel) =

Novel by Georges Ohnet

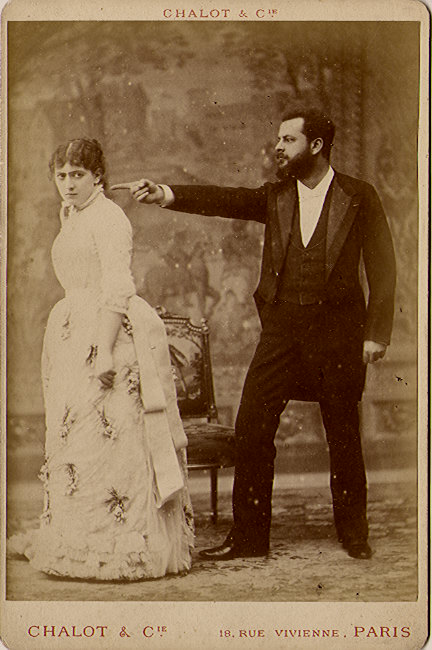
- Jane Hading and Jacques Damala in the stage adaptation
- Author: Georges Ohnet
- Language: French
- Publication date: 1882
- Publication place: France
- Media type: Print

The Ironmaster (original French: Le Maître de forges) is a French novel by Georges Ohnet, published in 1882.

A melodrama in a bourgeois setting, The Ironmaster was adapted for the theater by Ohnet himself the following year. Premiered at the Théâtre du Gymnase Marie Bell, the play became very popular, with more than 271 performances in a few months. An English adaptation by Arthur Wing Pinero was first staged in 1884, and was frequently revived during the following decade.

The story was also adapted for the screen on multiple occasions: in 1912, 1933, 1948, and 1959.
