= 1929 in film =

This is an overview of 1929 in film, including significant events, a list of films released and notable births and deaths.

== Events ==
The days of the silent film are numbered. A mad scramble to provide synchronized sound is on.

- February 1 – The Broadway Melody is released by MGM and becomes the first major musical film of the sound era, sparking a host of imitators as well as a series of Broadway Melody films that will run until 1940.
- February 18 – The first Academy Awards, or Oscars, are announced for the year ended August 1, 1928.
- March 3 – William Fox announces that he has taken control of Loews Inc., including its subsidiary Metro-Goldwyn-Mayer, buying shares from Marcus Loew's widow and sons and Nicholas Schenck for $50 million. The acquisition eventually falls through.
- May 16 – The first Academy Awards are distributed at The Hollywood Roosevelt Hotel in Los Angeles.
- May 26 – Fox Grandeur News is shown in Fox Film's new widescreen 70 mm Grandeur film format
- July 13 – The first all color talkie (in Technicolor), On with the Show, is released by Warner Bros. who lead the way in a new color revolution just as they had ushered in that of the talkies.
- July 17 – William Fox is badly injured in a car accident which kills his chauffeur.
- August 3 – The Cock-Eyed World beats every known gross for any box office attraction throughout the world with a reported first week gross of $173,391 at the Roxy Theatre (New York City).
- August 20 – Hallelujah! is the first Hollywood film to contain an entire black cast.
- August 22 – First in the Walt Disney Productions' animated short Silly Symphony series, The Skeleton Dance, is released.
- September – Paramount Pictures acquires 49% of CBS.
- October 24 – Jean Harlow signs a five-year, $100 per week contract with Howard Hughes.
- October 30 – Entertainment newspaper Variety report that Wall Street Lays An Egg leading to many prominent showman and film stars losing money on their investments.
- November – Warner Bros. gain complete control of First National Pictures buying Fox Film's 36% stake for $10 million
- November 10 – Première of John Grierson's documentary film Drifters about North Sea herring fishermen, made for the Empire Marketing Board, effectively inaugurating the British Documentary Film Movement. (It debuts at the private Film Society in London on a double-bill with the U.K. première of Eisenstein's The Battleship Potemkin.)
- November 15 – U.K. release of Atlantic, a film about the sinking of the RMS Titanic which is one of the first British sound-on-film movies and, in its simultaneously-shot German-language version, the first to be released in Germany; also the first Titanic movie with sound.
- December – Anti-trust suits are filed against William Fox and Warner Bros. by the US Department of Justice for Fox's acquisition of Loews and Warners' acquisition of the Stanley Corporation of America and First National.

== Academy Awards ==
The 2nd Academy Awards honored the best films released between August 1, 1928, and July 31, 1929. They took place on April 3, 1930, at an awards banquet in the Cocoanut Grove of the Ambassador Hotel in Los Angeles.

Most nominations: In Old Arizona (Fox Film Corporation) – 5

- Best Picture: The Broadway Melody (MGM)
- Best Director: Frank Lloyd – The Divine Lady
- Best Actor: Warner Baxter – In Old Arizona
- Best Actress: Mary Pickford – Coquette

Most awards – no film won more than 1 award

Note: Prior to 1933, awards were not based on calendar years. Best Picture, Actress and Director went to 1930 films.

== Top-grossing films (U.S.) ==
The top ten 1929 released films by box office gross in North America are as follows:

Highest-grossing films of 1929
Rank	Title	Distributor	Domestic rentals
1	The Broadway Melody	MGM	$2,808,000
2	The Cock-Eyed World	Fox Film	$2,700,000
3	Gold Diggers of Broadway	Warner Bros.	$2,540,000
4	Sunny Side Up	Fox Film	$2,190,000
5	Rio Rita	RKO	$1,775,000
6	On with the Show!	Warner Bros.	$1,741,000
7	Say It with Songs	Warner Bros.	$1,715,000
8	Show Boat	Universal	$1,643,000
9	The Desert Song	Warner Bros.	$1,549,000
10	The Hollywood Revue of 1929	MGM	$1,527,000

== Notable films released in 1929 ==
United States unless stated otherwise.

=== A ===
- After the Verdict, directed by Henrik Galeen, starring Olga Chekhova – (GB)
- Alibi, directed by Roland West, starring Chester Morris and Mae Busch, based on the 1927 stage play Nightstick by Elaine Sterne Carrington
- The Alley Cat (Nachtgestalten), directed by Hans Steinhoff, starring Mabel Poulton – (GB/Germany)
- The American Prisoner, directed by Thomas Bentley, starring Carl Brisson and Madeleine Carroll – (GB)
- Ang Mutya Ng Pamilihan (The Pearl of the Markets), directed by José Nepomuceno – (Philippines)
- Applause, directed by Rouben Mamoulian, starring Helen Morgan
- Arsenal (Арсенал), directed by Alexander Dovzhenko – (U.S.S.R.)
- Asphalt, directed by Joe May, starring Gustav Fröhlich – (Germany)
- Atlantic, directed by E. A. Dupont, starring Madeleine Carroll – (GB)
- The Awful Truth (lost), directed by Marshall Neilan

=== B ===
- Berth Marks, directed by Lewis R. Foster, starring Laurel and Hardy
- Big Business, directed by James W. Horne and Leo McCarey, starring Laurel and Hardy
- Big Time, directed by Kenneth Hawks, starring Lee Tracy
- Black and Tan, directed by Dudley Murphy, starring Duke Ellington and Fredi Washington
- Blackmail, directed by Alfred Hitchcock, based on the 1928 stage play by Charles Bennett – (GB)
- Black Waters (lost), directed by Marshall Neilan
- The Bridge of San Luis Rey, directed by Charles Brabin, starring Lili Damita
- Broadway, directed by Paul Fejos, starring Evelyn Brent
- The Broadway Melody, directed by Harry Beaumont, starring Charles King, Anita Page and Bessie Love
- Bulldog Drummond, directed by F. Richard Jones, starring Ronald Colman

=== C ===
- Cagliostro, directed by Richard Oswald, based on the 1929 novel by Johannes von Guenther – (Germany)
- The Canary Murder Case, directed by Malcolm St. Clair, starring William Powell, Louise Brooks and Jean Arthur
- Chamber of Horrors, directed by Walter Summers – (GB)
- The Charlatan, directed by George Melford
- Un Chien Andalou (An Andalusian Dog), directed by Luis Buñuel and Salvador Dalí – (France)
- Children of the Ritz (lost), directed by John Francis Dillon
- The Clue of the New Pin, directed by Arthur Maude – (GB)
- The Cocoanuts, directed by Robert Florey and Joseph Santley, starring the Marx Brothers
- A Cottage on Dartmoor, directed by Anthony Asquith – (GB)
- Coquette, Directed by Sam Taylor, starring Mary Pickford, Johnny Mack Brown and Matt Moore

=== D ===
- Dangerous Curves, directed by Lothar Mendes, starring Clara Bow and Richard Arlen
- Darkened Rooms, directed by Louis J. Gasnier, starring Evelyn Brent and Neil Hamilton
- Desert Nights, directed by William Nigh, starring John Gilbert, Ernest Torrence, and Mary Nolan
- The Desert Song, directed by Roy Del Ruth
- Devil-May-Care, directed by Sidney Franklin, starring Ramón Novarro
- Diary of a Lost Girl (Tagebuch einer Verlorenen), directed by G. W. Pabst, starring Louise Brooks – (Germany)
- Disraeli, directed by Alfred E. Green, starring George Arliss and Joan Bennett
- Drifters, documentary by John Grierson – (GB)
- Dynamite, directed by Cecil B. DeMille, starring Conrad Nagel and Kay Johnson

=== E ===
- Eternal Love, directed by Ernst Lubitsch, starring John Barrymore

=== F ===
- Fancy Baggage (lost), directed by John G. Adolfi, starring Audrey Ferris and Myrna Loy
- Father Vojtech (Páter Vojtěch), directed by Martin Frič – (Czechoslovakia)
- Finis Terræ, directed by Jean Epstein – (France)
- The Flying Fleet, directed by George Hill, starring Ramón Novarro, Ralph Graves and Anita Page
- The Flying Scotsman, directed by Castleton Knight, starring Ray Milland – (GB)
- Footlights and Fools (lost), directed by William A. Seiter, starring Colleen Moore and Fredric March
- The Four Feathers, directed by Merian C. Cooper, starring William Powell, Richard Arlen, Fay Wray, Clive Brook and Noah Beery Sr.
- Fox Movietone Follies of 1929 (lost), directed by David Butler
- Fräulein Else (Miss Else), directed by Paul Czinner, starring Elisabeth Bergner – (Germany)

=== G ===
- General Crack, directed by Alan Crosland, starring John Barrymore
- The General Line (Staroye i novoye), directed by Grigori Aleksandrov and Sergei Eisenstein – (U.S.S.R.)
- Glorifying the American Girl, directed by John W. Harkrider and Millard Webb, starring Mary Eaton
- Gold Diggers of Broadway (lost), directed by Roy Del Ruth
- The Great Gabbo, directed by James Cruze, starring Erich von Stroheim and Betty Compson
- The Greene Murder Case, directed by Frank Tuttle, starring William Powell

=== H ===
- Hallelujah, directed by King Vidor
- Hardboiled Rose, directed by F. Harmon Weight, starring Myrna Loy
- Hearts in Dixie, directed by Paul Sloane, starring Stepin Fetchit and Clarence Muse
- Hell's Heroes, directed by William Wyler, starring Charles Bickford
- High Treason, directed by Maurice Elvey, starring Jameson Thomas and Benita Hume – (GB)
- His Glorious Night, directed by Lionel Barrymore, starring John Gilbert
- The Hole in the Wall, directed by Robert Florey, starring Edward G. Robinson and Claudette Colbert
- The Hollywood Revue of 1929, directed by Charles Reisner, starring Conrad Nagel and Jack Benny
- Hot for Paris (lost), directed by Raoul Walsh, starring Victor McLaglen
- The Hound of the Baskervilles (Der Hund von Baskerville), directed by Richard Oswald, based on the 1902 novel by Arthur Conan Doyle – (Germany)
- House of Horror (lost), directed by Benjamin Christensen, starring Thelma Todd
- The House of Secrets (lost), directed by Edmund Lawrence, based on the 1926 novel by Sydney Horler

=== I ===
- The Informer, directed by Arthur Robison, starring Lya De Putti and Lars Hanson – (GB)
- The Iron Mask, directed by Allan Dwan, starring Douglas Fairbanks

=== K ===
- The Kiss, Jacques Feyder, starring Greta Garbo and Conrad Nagel
- Kitty, directed by Victor Saville – (GB)
- A Knight in London (Eine Nacht in London), directed by Lupu Pick, starring Lilian Harvey – (GB/Germany)

=== L ===
- The Lady Fare, directed by William Watson, screenplay by Spencer Williams Jr.
- The Lady Lies, directed by Hobart Henley, starring Walter Huston and Claudette Colbert
- Lady of the Pavements, directed by D. W. Griffith, starring William Boyd and Lupe Vélez
- Laila, directed by George Schnéevoigt, starring Mona Mårtenson
- Land Without Women, directed by Carmine Gallone, starring Conrad Veidt – (Germany)
- The Last Performance, directed by Paul Fejos, starring Conrad Veidt and Mary Philbin
- The Letter, directed by Jean de Limur, starring Jeanne Eagels
- The Locked Door, directed by George Fitzmaurice, starring Rod La Rocque and Barbara Stanwyck
- The Love Parade, directed by Ernst Lubitsch, starring Maurice Chevalier and Jeanette MacDonald
- Lucky Star, directed by Frank Borzage, starring Janet Gaynor and Charles Farrell
- Ludwig II, King of Bavaria (Ludwig der Zweite, König von Bayern), starring and directed by William Dieterle – (Germany)

=== M ===
- Madame X, directed by Lionel Barrymore, starring Ruth Chatterton and Lewis Stone
- Man with a Movie Camera (Chelovek s kinoapparatom), documentary directed by Dziga Vertov – (Ukrainian SSR)
- The Manxman, directed by Alfred Hitchcock – (GB)
- Marianne, directed by Robert Z. Leonard, starring Marion Davies
- Married in Hollywood (lost), directed by Marcel Silver
- Melody of the Heart, directed by Hanns Schwarz, starring Dita Parlo and Willy Fritsch – (Germany)
- The Miraculous Life of Thérèse Martin (La Vie miraculeuse de Thérèse Martin), directed by Julien Duvivier – (France)
- Les Mystères du Château de Dé (The Mysteries of the Chateau of Dice), starring and directed by Man Ray – (France)
- The Mysterious Dr. Fu Manchu, directed by Rowland V. Lee, starring Warner Oland, Neil Hamilton and Jean Arthur, based on the 1913 novel The Mystery of Dr. Fu-Manchu by Sax Rohmer
- The Mysterious Island, directed by Lucien Hubbard, starring Lionel Barrymore

=== N ===
- Navy Blues, directed by Clarence Brown, starring William Haines, Anita Page and Karl Dane
- The New Babylon (Novyy Vavilon), directed by Grigori Kozintsev and Leonid Trauberg – (USSR)
- New York Nights, directed by Lewis Milestone, starring Norma Talmadge and Gilbert Roland

=== O ===
- On with the Show!, directed by Alan Crosland
- The Organist at St. Vitus' Cathedral (Varhaník u sv. Víta), directed by Martin Frič – (Czechoslovakia)

=== P ===
- Pandora's Box (Die Büchse der Pandora), directed by G. W. Pabst, starring Louise Brooks – (Germany)
- Paris (lost), directed by Clarence G. Badger, starring Irène Bordoni
- Patria Amore, starring Julian Manansala – (Philippines)
- Piccadilly, directed by E. A. Dupont, starring Anna May Wong and Gilda Gray – (GB)
- Pointed Heels, directed by A. Edward Sutherland, starring William Powell and Fay Wray

=== Q ===
- Queen Kelly, directed by Erich von Stroheim, starring Gloria Swanson

=== R ===
- Rain, documentary directed by Mannus Franken and Joris Ivens – (Netherlands)
- Rasputin, directed by Max Neufeld – (Germany)
- Redskin, directed by Victor Schertzinger, starring Richard Dix
- The Rescue, directed by Herbert Brenon, starring Ronald Colman and Lili Damita
- Resia Boroboedoer (Secret of Borobudur) – (Dutch East Indies)
- The Return of the Rat, directed by Graham Cutts, starring Ivor Novello and Isabel Jeans – (GB)
- The Return of Sherlock Holmes, directed by Basil Dean, starring Clive Brook
- Rio Rita, directed by Luther Reed, starring Bebe Daniels and John Boles
- The River (lost), directed by Frank Borzage, starring Charles Farrell and Mary Duncan
- The Runaway Princess, directed by Anthony Asquith and Fritz Wendhausen, starring Mady Christians – (GB/Germany)

=== S ===
- Sa Landas ng Pag-ibig (The Path of Love), directed by José Nepomuceno – (Philippines)
- Sally, directed by John Francis Dillon, starring Marilyn Miller, Joe E. Brown and Pert Kelton
- Salute, directed by John Ford, and starring George O'Brien, Helen Chandler and Stepin Fetchit
- The Saturday Night Kid, directed by A. Edward Sutherland, starring Clara Bow and Jean Arthur
- Seven Footprints to Satan, written and directed by Benjamin Christensen, starring Thelma Todd and Creighton Hale
- Seven Keys to Baldpate, directed by Reginald Barker, starring Richard Dix, based on the 1913 novel by Earl Derr Biggers and stage play by George M. Cohan
- Show Boat, directed by Harry A. Pollard, starring Laura La Plante and Joseph Schildkraut, based on the 1926 novel by Edna Ferber
- The Show of Shows, directed by John G. Adolfi
- Side Street, directed by Malcolm St. Clair, starring the Moore Brothers
- The Silent House, directed by Walter Forde, based on the 1928 novel by John G. Brandon
- The Singing Brakeman, a short featuring Jimmie Rodgers
- The Single Standard, directed by John S. Robertson, starring Greta Garbo, Nils Asther and Johnny Mack Brown
- The Skeleton Dance, a Walt Disney animated short
- Smilin' Guns, directed by Henry MacRae, starring Hoot Gibson
- Spite Marriage, directed by Edward Sedgwick and Buster Keaton, starring Buster Keaton
- St. Louis Blues, directed by Dudley Murphy, starring Bessie Smith
- Den starkaste (The Strongest), directed by Axel Lindblom and Alf Sjöberg – (Sweden)
- Stark Mad (lost), directed by Lloyd Bacon, starring H. B. Warner and Louise Fazenda
- Street Girl, directed by Wesley Ruggles, starring Betty Compson
- Sunny Side Up, directed by David Butler, starring Janet Gaynor and Charles Farrell
- Syncopation, directed by Bert Glennon

=== T ===
- The Taming of the Shrew, directed by Sam Taylor, starring Mary Pickford and Douglas Fairbanks
- The Thirteenth Chair, directed by Tod Browning, starring Conrad Nagel and Leila Hyams, based on the 1916 stage play by Bayard Veiller
- This Thing Called Love (lost), directed by Paul L. Stein, starring Edmund Lowe and Constance Bennett
- The Three Kings (Ein Mädel und drei Clowns), directed by Hans Steinhoff – (GB/Germany)
- The Three Passions, directed by Rex Ingram, starring Alice Terry – (GB)
- Thunder (lost), directed by William Nigh, starring Lon Chaney and Phyllis Haver
- Thunderbolt, directed by Josef von Sternberg, starring George Bancroft, Fay Wray and Richard Arlen
- A Throw of Dice, directed by Franz Osten – (Germany/GB/India)
- The Trespasser, directed by Edmund Goulding, starring Gloria Swanson and Robert Ames
- Turksib, documentary directed by Viktor Alexandrovitsh Turin – (U.S.S.R.)

=== U ===
- The Unholy Night, directed by Lionel Barrymore, starring Ernest Torrence and Roland Young

=== V ===
- The Vagabond Lover, directed by Marshall Neilan, starring Rudy Vallée and Marie Dressler
- The Virginian, directed by Victor Fleming, starring Gary Cooper, Walter Huston, Richard Arlen and Mary Brian

=== W ===
- Wait and See, starring and directed by Walter Forde – (GB)
- Wall Street, directed by Roy William Neill, starring Ralph Ince and Aileen Pringle
- Welcome Danger, directed by Clyde Bruckman, starring Harold Lloyd
- Where East Is East, directed by Tod Browning, starring Lon Chaney, Lupe Vélez and Estelle Taylor
- The White Hell of Pitz Palu (Die weiße Hölle vom Piz Palü), directed by Arnold Fanck and G. W. Pabst, starring Leni Riefenstahl – (Germany)
- Why Be Good?, directed by William A. Seiter, starring Colleen Moore and Neil Hamilton
- Wild Orchids, directed by Sidney Franklin, starring Greta Garbo, Lewis Stone and Nils Asther
- Wolf Song, directed by Victor Fleming, starring Gary Cooper, Lupe Vélez and Louis Wolheim
- Woman in the Moon (Frau im Mond), directed by Fritz Lang – (Germany)
- The Woman in White, directed by Herbert Wilcox, starring Blanche Sweet, based on the 1859 novel by Wilkie Collins – (GB)
- Wonder of Women (lost), directed by Clarence Brown, starring Lewis Stone and Leila Hyams
- The Wonderful Lies of Nina Petrovna (Die wunderbare Lüge der Nina Petrowna), directed by Hanns Schwarz – (Germany)
- Words and Music, directed by James Tinling
- The Wrecker (Der Würger), directed by Géza von Bolváry – (GB/Germany)

== Serials ==
- The Ace of Scotland Yard, 10 chapters (215 minutes)
- The Black Book, 10 chapters
- The Diamond Master, 10 chapters
- The Fatal Warning, 10 chapters (200 min)
- The Fire Detective, 10 chapters
- The King of the Kongo, 10 chapters (213 min)
- The Pirate of Panama, 12 chapters
- Queen of the Northwoods, 10 chapters
- Tarzan the Tiger, 15 chapters (266 min)

== Short film series ==
- Our Gang (1922–1944)
- Laurel and Hardy (1921–1943)
- Dogville Comedies (1929-1931)

== Animated short film series ==
- Felix the Cat (1919–1936)
- Aesop's Film Fables (1921–1933)
- Krazy Kat (1925–1940)
- Oswald the Lucky Rabbit (1927–1938)
- Inkwell Imps (1927–1929)
- Mickey Mouse
  - The Barn Dance
  - The Opry House
  - When The Cat's Away
  - The Barnyard Battle
  - The Plow Boy
  - The Karnival Kid
  - Mickey's Follies
  - Mickey's Choo-Choo
  - The Jazz Fool
  - Jungle Rhythm
  - The Haunted House
  - Wild Waves
- Silly Symphonies
  - The Skeleton Dance
  - El Terrible Toreador
  - Springtime
  - Hell's Bells
  - The Merry Dwarfs
- Screen Songs (1929–1938)
- Talkartoons (1929–1932)

== Births ==
- January 1 – Haruo Nakajima, Japanese actor (died 2017)
- January 3 – Sergio Leone, Italian director, producer and screenwriter (died 1989)
- January 7 – Terry Moore, American actress
- January 8 – Saeed Jaffrey, Indian-born actor (died 2015)
- January 9 – Ulu Grosbard, Belgian-American theatre and film director and film producer (died 2012)
- January 13 - Shigeru Kōyama, Japanese actor (died 2017)
- January 17 - Norman Kaye, Australian actor (died 2007)
- January 20 – Arte Johnson, American actor (died 2019)
- January 27 – Michael Craig, British actor and screenwriter
- January 31 – Jean Simmons, English-American actress (died 2010)
- February 4 – Jerry Adler, American actor (died 2025)
- February 8 – Claude Rich, French actor (died 2017)
- February 10 – Jerry Goldsmith, American composer (died 2004)
- February 13 - Lee Fierro, American actress (died 2020)
- February 14
  - Roman Kłosowski, Polish actor (died 2018)
  - Allan Miller, American actor and director
  - Vic Morrow, American actor (died 1982)
- February 17 - Patricia Routledge, English actress and singer (died 2025)
  - February 20 - Amanda Blake, American actress (died 1989)
- February 22
  - James Hong, American actor, voice actor, producer and director of Chinese descent
  - Donald May, American actor (died 2022)
  - Rebecca Schull, American actress
- March 4 - Columba Domínguez, Mexican actress (died 2014)
- March 10 - Harry Bugin, American actor and musician (died 2005)
- March 11 – Timothy Carey, American actor (died 1994)
- March 13 – Peter Breck, American actor (died 2012)
- March 16 - Nadja Tiller, Austrian actress (died 2023)
- March 23 – Mark Rydell, American actor, director and producer (died 2026)
- March 24 – Pat Renella, American actor (died 2012)
- March 27
  - Anne Ramsey, American actress (died 1988)
  - Claire Maurier, French actress (died 2026)
- March 30 - Richard Dysart, American actor (died 2015)
- March 31 – Lee Patterson, Canadian actor (died 2007)
- April 1
  - Barbara Bryne, British-American actress (died 2023)
  - Jonathan Haze, American actor, producer and screenwriter (died 2024)
  - Jane Powell, American actress, singer and dancer (died 2021)
- April 5 – Nigel Hawthorne, English actor (died 2001)
- April 6 - Joi Lansing, American actress (died 1972)
- April 10
  - Liz Sheridan, American actress (died 2022)
  - Max von Sydow, Swedish actor (died 2020)
- April 11 - Jack Betts, American actor (died 2025)
- April 12 - Elspet Gray, Scottish actress (died 2013)
- April 15 – Mariano Laurenti, Italian director and actor (died 2022)
- April 17 – Michael Forest, American actor (died 2026)
- April 28
  - Bhanu Athaiya, Indian costume designer (died 2020)
  - Evangelina Elizondo, Mexican actress and singer (died 2017)
- May 2 – Eddie Garcia, Filipino actor (died 2019)
- May 4 – Audrey Hepburn, British actress (died 1993)
- May 5 – Ilene Woods, American actress and singer (died 2010)
- May 8 – Miyoshi Umeki, Japanese singer and actress (died 2007)
- May 10 - George Coe, American actor (died 2015)
- May 11 - Margaret Kerry, American actress and director (died 2026)
- May 17 – Miriam Byrd-Nethery, American actress (died 2003)
- May 23 – Paul Wexler, American actor (died 1979)
- May 24 - Brian Wenzel, Australian actor, comedian, director and singer (died 2024)
- May 25 – Ann Robinson, American actress (died 2025)
- May 26 – Lloyd Reckord, Jamaican actor and filmmaker (died 2015)
- May 28 – Shane Rimmer, Canadian actor (died 2019)
- May 31
  - Menahem Golan, Israeli director and producer (died 2014)
  - Fakhri Khorvash, Iranian actress (died 2023)
- June 3 – Chuck Barris, American game show host (died 2017)
- June 8 – Gastone Moschin, Italian actor (died 2017)
- June 16 – Gerson da Cunha, Indian actor (died 2022)
- June 17 – James Shigeta, American actor, singer and musician of Japanese descent (died 2014)
- June 19 - Thelma Barlow, English actress and writer
- June 20 – Bonnie Bartlett, American actress
- June 21 - John Brandon, American actor (died 2014)
- June 23 – Claude Goretta, Swiss producer and director (died 2019)
- June 29 - Pat Crawford Brown, American actress (died 2019)
- July 5 – Katherine Helmond, American actress (died 2019)
- July 11 – David Kelly, Irish actor (died 2012)
- July 21
  - Asta Vihandi, Estonian opera singer, actress and dancer (died 1993)
  - John Woodvine, English actor (died 2025)
  - Jules Walter, British actor (died 2025)
- July 22 - Perry Lopez, American actor (died 2008)
- July 23 – Maya Buzinova, Russian animator (died 2022)
- July 30 - Sid Krofft, Canadian puppeteer and film producer (died 2026)
- July 31
  - Pat Cooper, American actor and comedian (died 2023)
  - Don Murray, American actor (died 2024)
- August 1 – Camillo Milli, Italian actor (died 2022)
- August 12 - John Bluthal, Australian actor and comedian (died 2018)
- August 15 – George Martin, American actor (died 2010)
- August 21
  - Vija Artmane, Latvian actress (died 2008)
  - John McMartin, American actor (died 2016)
- August 28 – Ken Gampu, South African actor (died 2003)
- August 29 - Robert W. Castle, American actor (died 2012)
- September 1 - Tomisaburo Wakayama, Japanese actor (died 1992)
- September 2
  - Hal Ashby, American director (died 1988)
  - Victor Spinetti, Welsh actor, author, poet and raconteur (died 2012)
- September 3 – Irene Papas, Greek actress (died 2022)
- September 4 – Nina Urgant, Russian actress (died 2021)
- September 5
  - Edward S. Feldman, American producer (died 2020)
  - Bob Newhart, American actor and comedian (died 2024)
- September 11 – Eve Brent, American actress (died 2011)
- September 18 – Elizabeth Spriggs, English actress (died 2008)
- September 20
  - Kurt Kren, Austrian experimental director (died 1998)
  - Hans von Borsody, German actor (died 2013)
  - Vittorio Taviani, Italian director (died 2018)
- September 21
  - Héctor Alterio, Argentine actor (died 2025)
  - Elsa Raven, American character actress (died 2020)
- September 22 – Maria Charles, English actress, director and comedian (died 2023)
- September 25 – Ronnie Barker, English actor and comedian (died 2005)
- September 27 - Leonard Harris, American actor (died 2011)
- September 28 - Frances Taylor Davis, American dancer and actress (died 2018)
- October 2 – Moses Gunn, American actor (died 1993)
- October 4 - Scotty Beckett, American actor (died 1968)
- October 6 – Bruno Cremer, French actor (died 2010)
- October 14 – Norbert Gastell, German voice actor (died 2015)
- October 15 - Witold Sobociński, Polish actor (died 2018)
- October 16
  - Jane Griffiths, English actress (died 1975)
  - Fernanda Montenegro, Brazilian actress
- October 20
- Colin Jeavons, British actor
- October 24 – Clifford Rose, English actor (died 2021)
- October 28
  - Jack Hedley, British actor (died 2021)
  - Joan Plowright, English actress (died 2025)
- October 31 – Bud Spencer, Italian actor, professional swimmer and water polo player (died 2016)
- November 6 – June Squibb, American actress
- November 12
  - Etchika Choureau, French actress (died 2022)
  - Grace Kelly, American-Monégasque actress (died 1982)
- November 15 – Ed Asner, American actor (died 2021)
- November 20 – Jerry Hardin, American actor
- November 21 – Niall Tóibín, Irish actor and comedian (died 2019)
- November 28 – Berry Gordy, American producer
- November 30
  - Dick Clark, American television and radio personality, television producer and actor (died 2012)
  - Joan Ganz Cooney, American television writer and producer
- December 1 – David Doyle, American actor (died 1997)
- December 6 – Alain Tanner, Swiss film director (died 2022)
- December 8 – Paddy O'Byrne, Irish radio broadcaster and actor (died 2013)
- December 9 – John Cassavetes, American actor, director (died 1989)
- December 13 – Christopher Plummer, Canadian actor (died 2021)
- December 20 – Zebedy Colt, American actor, musician, adult film director and star (died 2004)
- December 31 - George Schlatter, American director and producer

== Deaths ==
- January 5 – Marc McDermott, Australian actor (born 1881)
- February 18
  - Hardee Kirkland, American stage and screen actor (born 1868)
  - William Russell, American actor (born 1884)
- February 24 – Frank Keenan, American actor (born 1858)
- May 9 – Fred C. Truesdell, stage & film actor (born 1870)
- May 12 – Charles Swickard, German-American director and actor (born 1861)
- July 2 – Gladys Brockwell, American actress (born 1894)
- July 3 – Dustin Farnum, American stage & silent screen star (born 1874)
- July 6 – Cliff Bowes, American comedian (born 1894)
- August 2 – Mae Costello, American actress (born 1882)
- September 2 – Paul Leni, German film and art director (born 1885)
- October 3 – Jeanne Eagels, American actress (born 1890)
- October 31 – Norman Pritchard, actor, Olympic athlete (born 1877)
- November 2 – Leo D. Maloney, actor and director (born 1888)
- November 24 – Raymond Hitchcock, American actor (born 1865)

== Film debuts ==
- Adrienne Ames – Sally
- Eve Arden – Song of Love
- Hooper Atchley – Love at First Sight
- Roscoe Ates – South Sea Rose
- Lew Ayres – The Sophomore
- Charles Bickford – South Sea Rose
- Lilian Bond – No More Children
- Patti Brill – The Vagabond Lover
- Virginia Bruce – The Love Parade
- John Carroll – Marianne
- Ilka Chase – Paris Bound
- Lita Chevret – Fox Movietone Follies of 1929
- Mae Clarke – Big Time
- D. A. Clarke-Smith – Atlantic
- June Clyde – Street Girl
- Jackie Cooper – Fox Movietone Follies of 1929
- Frank Craven – The Very Idea
- Cecil Cunningham – Their Own Desire
- Henry Daniell – The Awful Truth
- Frances Dee – Words and Music
- Dudley Digges – Condemned
- Cliff Edwards – Marianne
- Glenda Farrell – Lucky Boy
- Wallace Ford – Married in Hollywood
- Norman Foster – Gentlemen of the Press
- Kay Francis – Gentlemen of the Press
- William Gargan – Lucky Boy
- Friedrich Gnaß – Beyond the Street
- Paulette Goddard – The Locked Door
- Minna Gombell – The Great Power
- Gavin Gordon – Chasing Through Europe
- Betty Grable – Happy Days
- Dorothy Granger – Words and Music
- Danny Green – The Crooked Billet
- Ann Harding – Paris Bound
- Theresa Harris – Thunderbolt
- George "Gabby" Hayes – The Rainbow Man
- Halliwell Hobbes – Lucky in Love
- John Huston – The Shakedown
- Walter Huston – Gentlemen of the Press
- Warren Hymer – Speakeasy
- Dean Jagger – The Woman from Hell
- William Janney – Coquette
- Dorothy Jordan – Black Magic
- Vi Kaley – Piccadilly
- Pert Kelton – Sally
- Germaine Kerjean – Monte Cristo
- Franziska Kinz – Diary of a Lost Girl
- Florence Lake – New Year's Eve
- Allan Lane – Not Quite Decent
- Lola Lane – Speakeasy
- Charles Laughton – Piccadilly
- Anderson Lawler – River of Romance
- Dorothy Lee – Syncopation
- Peter Lorre – The Missing Wife
- Jeanette MacDonald – The Love Parade
- Fred MacMurray – Girls Gone Wild
- David Manners – The Sky Hawk
- Raymond Massey – High Treason
- Edwin Maxwell – The Taming of the Shrew
- Frank McHugh – If Men Played Cards as Women Do
- Leila McIntyre – Hurricane
- Robert Montgomery – The Single Standard
- Natalie Moorhead – Thru Different Eyes
- Karen Morley – Thru Different Eyes
- Renate Müller – Peter the Mariner
- Clarence Muse – Hearts in Dixie
- Line Noro – The Divine Voyage
- Una O'Connor – Dark Red Roses
- Lee Patrick – Strange Cargo
- Bernice Pilot – Hearts in Dixie
- Basil Radford – Barnum Was Right
- George Raft – Queen of the Night Clubs
- Gene Raymond – The Marriage Playground
- Rene Ray – High Treason
- Craig Reynolds – Coquette
- Claire Rochelle – Tanned Legs
- Sig Ruman – Lucky Boy
- Marion Shilling – Wise Girls
- Verree Teasdale – Syncopation
- Regis Toomey – Alibi
- Lupita Tovar – The Veiled Woman
- Lee Tracy – Salute
- Ilse Trautschold – Mother Krause's Journey to Happiness
- Arthur Treacher – The Battle of Paris
- Ida Turay – Prisoner Number Seven
- Helen Twelvetrees – The Ghost Talks
- Rudy Vallée – The Vagabond Lover
- Nella Walker – Tanned Legs
- Johnny Weissmuller – Glorifying the American Girl
