= L'Âme de Pierre =

1880 novel by Georges Ohnet

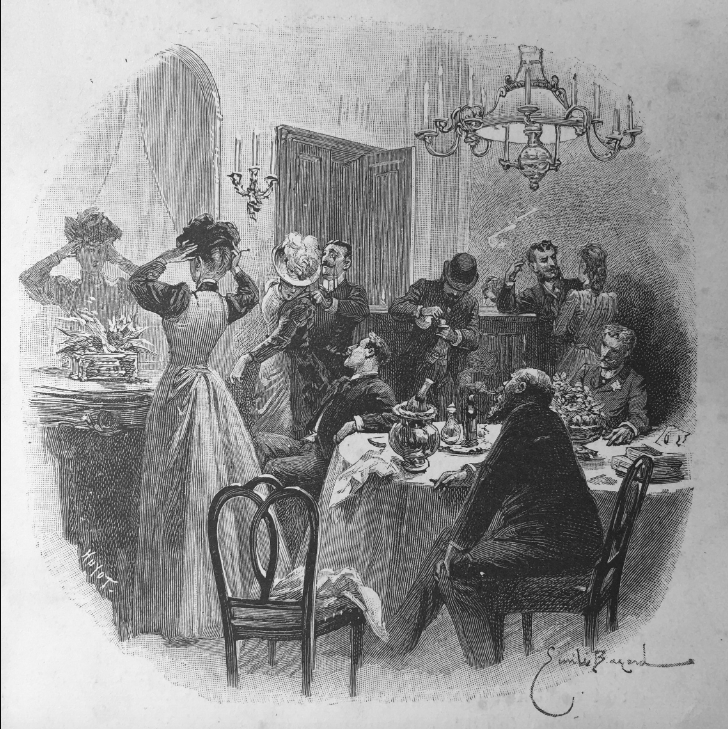
- Illustration by Emilie Bayard
- Author: Georges Ohnet
- Language: French
- Publication date: 1880
- Publication place: France
- Media type: Print

L'Âme de Pierre ("Pierre's soul" or "The Soul of Stone") is a French novel by Georges Ohnet, first published in 1890.

It was adapted for the screen twice: in 1918 and in 1929.

== Synopsis ==
At a dinner party hosted by Prince Patrizzi, Doctor Davidoff shares the idea that a person may save the life of a loved one who is deathly ill, by giving them their soul, at the price of their own life. This makes a great impression on Pierre Laurier, a painter, and Jacques de Vignes, who is seriously ill himself.

The same evening, Pierre disappears after having been dismissed by his mistress, the beautiful Clémence Villa, leaving behind a suicide note in which he expresses the wish to give up his soul to restore Jacques' health...
