= Serge Panine (novel) =

1881 novel by Georges Ohnet

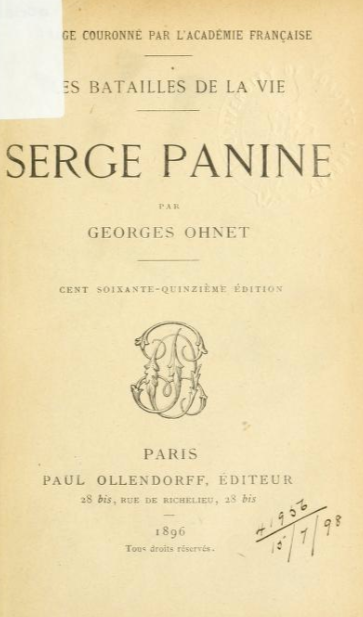
- Title page for Serge Panine (1896 edition)
- Author: Georges Ohnet
- Language: French
- Publisher: Paul Ollendorff
- Publication date: 1881
- Publication place: Paris
- Media type: Print

Serge Panine is an 1881 novel by the French writer Georges Ohnet.

== Adaptations ==
It has been adapted into films on four occasions:

- Serge Panine (1913 film), a French silent film
- Serge Panine (1915 film), an American silent film
- A Life for a Life (1916), a Russian film
- Serge Panine (1922 film), an Austrian-French silent film
- Serge Panine (1939 film), a French film

== Bibliography ==
- Goble, Alan. The Complete Index to Literary Sources in Film. Walter de Gruyter, 1999.
