= Regina Sarpi =

1875 play by Georges Ohnet and Louis Denayrouze

- Written by: Georges Ohnet; Louis Denayrouze
- Original language: French

Premiere
- Date premiered: 1875
- Place premiered: France

Regina Sarpi is an 1875 drama in 5 acts written by Georges Ohnet and Louis Denayrouze.

It is significant for constituting Ohnet's first attempt at writing for the stage, which helped raise his prominence on the French literary stage.
