= Prince Jean (1934 film) =

- Directed by: Jean de Marguenat
- Written by: Charles Méré (play); Paul Schiller
- Starring: Pierre Richard-Willm; Natalie Paley; Nina Myral
- Cinematography: Enzo Riccioni
- Edited by: René Renoux
- Music by: Adolphe Borchard
- Production company: Fox Film
- Distributed by: Fox Film
- Release date: 21 December 1934
- Running time: 95 minutes
- Country: France
- Language: French

Prince Jean (French: Le prince Jean) is a 1934 French drama film directed by Jean de Marguenat and starring Pierre Richard-Willm, Natalie Paley and Nina Myral. The story had previously been made as a 1928 silent film Prince Jean.

== Cast ==
- Pierre Richard-Willm as Le prince Jean d'Axel
- Natalie Paley as Claire d'Arlong
- Nina Myral as Madame de Grivelles
- Alexandre Arnaudy as Liétard
- Roger Karl as Le comte de Wavre
- Aimé Clariond as Le baron d'Arnheim
- Jean Debucourt as Le prince Léopold d'Arnheim
- Gaby Basset as Fernande
- Germaine Le Senne as La comtesse d'Osterwick
- Georges Prieur as Le comte d'Osterwick
- Anthony Gildès as Le conseiller Keller
- Valdini as Le chanteur Italien
- Doumel as Le garçon de café
- Henri Jullien as Monsieur François
- Georges Paulais as Harlingen
- Léon Arvel as Le baron Denis
- René Navarre
- Pierre Marnat
- Simone Montalet
- Léna Darthès

== Bibliography ==
- Slavin, David Henry . Colonial Cinema and Imperial France, 1919–1939: White Blind Spots, Male Fantasies, Settler Myths. JHU Press, 2001.
