= The Golden Age (1942 film) =

1942 film

- Directed by: Jean de Limur
- Written by: Charles Méré
- Produced by: René Keller; Charles Méré
- Starring: Elvire Popesco; André Alerme; Jean Tissier
- Cinematography: Nicolas Hayer
- Edited by: Jacques de Casembroot
- Music by: Henri Goublier
- Production company: Les Films Minerva
- Distributed by: Les Films Minerva
- Release date: 28 June 1942
- Running time: 85 minutes
- Country: France
- Language: French

The Golden Age (French: L'âge d'or) is a 1942 French comedy film directed by Jean de Limur and starring Elvire Popesco, André Alerme and Jean Tissier. It was shot at the Cité Elgé Studios in Paris. The film's sets were designed by the art director Pierre Marquet.

== Synopsis ==
The Parisian businessman Dubélair employs the exuberant White Russian Vera as a maid who arrives with her boyfriend Boris in tow who she passes off as her brother. One day her impecunious Boss pays her with a lottery ticket but then steals it back when it proves to be the winning number. Ultimately all is resolved with Vera and Boris now employing their former masters as their servants.

== Cast ==
- Elvire Popesco as Véra Termutzki
- André Alerme as Georges Dubélair
- Jean Tissier as L'escroc Lubercy
- Gilbert Gil as Henri Dubélair
- Andrée Guize as Juliette Dubélair
- Denise Bréal as Irène
- Clément Duhour as Boris Ivanovitch
- Louis Blanche as Jules - le chasseur du casino

== Bibliography ==
- Rège, Philippe. Encyclopedia of French Film Directors, Volume 1. Scarecrow Press, 2009.
- Siclier, Jacques. La France de Pétain et son cinéma. H. Veyrier, 1981.
