= Sunday of Life =

1931 film

- Camilla Horn
- Directed by: Leo Mittler
- Written by: Béla Balázs; Edmund Goulding
- Starring: Camilla Horn; Willy Clever; Oscar Marion
- Cinematography: Enzo Riccioni
- Production company: Paramount Pictures
- Distributed by: Paramount Pictures
- Release date: April 10, 1931
- Running time: 79 minutes
- Country: United States
- Language: German

Sunday of Life (German: Sonntag des Lebens) is a 1931 American drama film directed by Leo Mittler and starring Camilla Horn, Willy Clever and Oscar Marion. It was made at the Joinville Studios in Paris by Paramount Pictures as the German-language version of The Devil's Holiday.

== Cast ==
- Camilla Horn as Ellen Hobart
- Willy Clever as David Stone
- Oskar Marion as Mark Stone
- Leopold von Ledebur as Ezra Stone
- Werner Kepich as Charlie Thorn
- Otto Kronburger as Dr. Reynolds
- Peter Ihle as Monk Mac Connell
- Emmerich Lukas as Jack Carr
- Ernestine Mayer as Tante Betty
- Eugen Rex as Hamond
- Margarete Roma as Ethel

== Bibliography ==
- Alan Gevinson. Within Our Gates: Ethnicity in American Feature Films, 1911-1960. University of California Press, 1997.
