= Agon-Coutainville =

- Commune
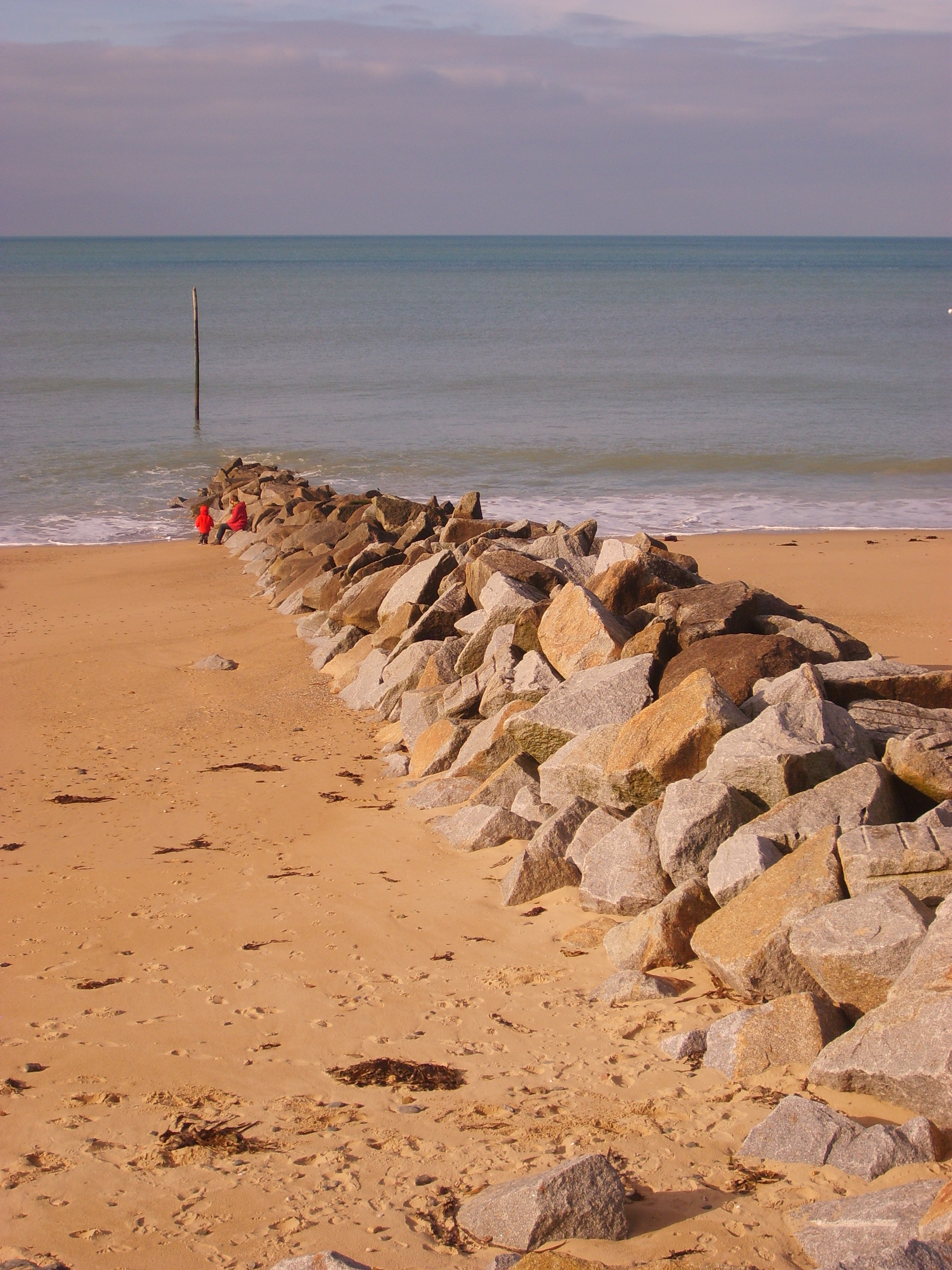
- The beach at Coutainville

- Coat of arms
- Location of Agon-Coutainville
- Location within France Location within Normandy
- Coordinates: 49°02′N 1°35′W
- Country: France
- Region: Normandy
- Department: Manche
- Arrondissement: Coutances
- Canton: Agon-Coutainville
- Intercommunality: Coutances Mer et Bocage

Government
  - Mayor (2020–2026): Christian Dutertre
- Area^{1}: 12.35 km^{2} (4.77 sq mi)
- Elevation: 39 m (128 ft)
- Highest elevation: 46 m (151 ft)
- Lowest elevation: 0 m (0 ft)
- Population (2023): 3,020
  - Density: 245/km^{2} (633/sq mi)
- Time zone: UTC+01:00 (CET)
  - Summer (DST): UTC+02:00 (CEST)
- INSEE/Postal code: 50003 /50230
- ^{1} French Land Register data, which excludes lakes, ponds, glaciers > 1 km^{2} (0.386 sq mi or 247 acres) and river estuaries.

Agon-Coutainville (French pronunciation: [aɡɔ̃ kutɛ̃vil]) is a commune in the Manche department in the Normandy region in northwestern France.

== Population ==
Historical population
Year	Pop.	±% p.a.
1968	2,280	—
1975	2,349	+0.43%
1982	2,321	−0.17%
1990	2,510	+0.98%
1999	2,723	+0.91%
2007	2,798	+0.34%
2012	2,782	−0.11%
2017	2,791	+0.06%
2023	3,020	+1.32%
Source: INSEE

== Heraldry ==
Arms of Agon-Coutainville	The arms of Agon-Coutainville are blazoned : Quarterly: 1&4 Gules, in bend sinister 3 leopards bendwise; 2 Azure, per fess azure and barry argent and azure, a sail and in sinister chief 2 seagulls argent; 3 Vert, a horse head contourny between tennis racquet with a ball and a golf club with a ball argent.

== Personalities ==
- Berthe Dagmar (1881–1934)
- This is the village of radio personality Madame Leprieur.

== See also ==
- Communes of the Manche department
