= Walter Goehr =

German composer and conductor

Walter Goehr (German: [ˈvaltɐ ˈɡøːɐ̯]; 28 May 1903 – 4 December 1960) was a German composer and conductor who from 1937, lived and worked in the UK. He was the father of composer Alexander Goehr.

== Biography ==
Goehr was born in Berlin, where he studied with Arnold Schoenberg and embarked on a conducting career, before being forced as a Jew to seek employment outside Germany after working for Berlin Radio in 1932. He was invited to become music director for the His Master's Voice, so he moved to London. In 1937, he conducted the London Philharmonic Orchestra in the premiere recording of Bizet's Symphony in C. During his years as a staff conductor for EMI, he conducted the orchestra for many recordings, including accompaniments for arias sung by Beniamino Gigli, Richard Tauber and Joseph Schmidt. In more popular items, his name appears on the record labels as 'G. Walter' or 'George Walter'. In addition, he conducted for many concerto recordings, including some by Benno Moiseiwitsch, Myra Hess and others. After the war he conducted for several smaller recording companies based in Europe, including for the concerto recordings of the short-lived Australian pianist Noel Mewton-Wood.

As well as teaching composition in Britain he also instructed pupils in conducting, one of whom was the young Wally Stott, later known as Angela Morley. In England he worked for the Columbia Record Company, and between 1945 and 1948 was conductor of the BBC Theatre Orchestra (the predecessor of today's BBC Concert Orchestra); he was also a skilled arranger. In January 1946, he conducted the orchestra for the premiere performance of Louis MacNeice's radio play The Dark Tower, with music by Benjamin Britten, on the BBC Home Service. He was one of many musicians of European origin and training recruited by Michael Tippett for the staff of Morley College. Goehr conducted many important premieres at Morley, including the first British performance of Monteverdi's Vespro della Beata Vergine of 1610.

His first successful composition was Malpopita in 1931, an opera especially designed for radio broadcast. This work was not scheduled for its first live performance until 6 May 2004, in Berlin, Prenzlauer Berg, Abspannwerk Humboldt.

In 1942, he made a new arrangement of Mussorgsky's piano suite Pictures at an Exhibition with a subsidiary piano part. In 1946, he arranged a number of Mussorgsky's piano pieces into the orchestral suite Pictures from the Crimea. In 1946, Goehr composed the music for the much-acclaimed film Great Expectations, directed by David Lean. He wrote several other film scores. He was also well known for conducting film soundtracks, including A Canterbury Tale, for which his friend Allan Gray had composed the score.

In 1952 he conducted the first recording of L'incoronazione di Poppea, conducting the Tonhalle-Orchester Zürich in a live stage performance. The LP version, issued in 1954, won a Grand Prix du Disque in 1954.

He also conducted the UK premiere of Olivier Messiaen's Turangalîla-Symphonie in 1953.

He died in Sheffield City Hall, England, on 4 December 1960, immediately after conducting a performance of Handel's Messiah.

Goehr married his wife Laelia, a classically trained pianist, cabaret artist and photographer, in the early 1930s. She took informal photography lessons with Bill Brandt and set up her own studios in Amersham, Buckinghamshire, where they lived from the start of World War II. Their son, composer and academic Alexander Goehr, was born in 1932.

== Selected filmography ==
- The King of Paris (1930, French)
- The King of Paris (1930, German)
- Invitation to the Waltz (1935)
- The Amateur Gentleman (1936)
- Secret Lives (1937)
- What a Man! (1938)
- The Ghost Train (1941)
- Great Expectations (1946)
- I'll Get You for This (1951)

== See also ==
- List of émigré composers in Britain
