= Olga Rakhmanova =

Russian actress and film director (1871–1943)

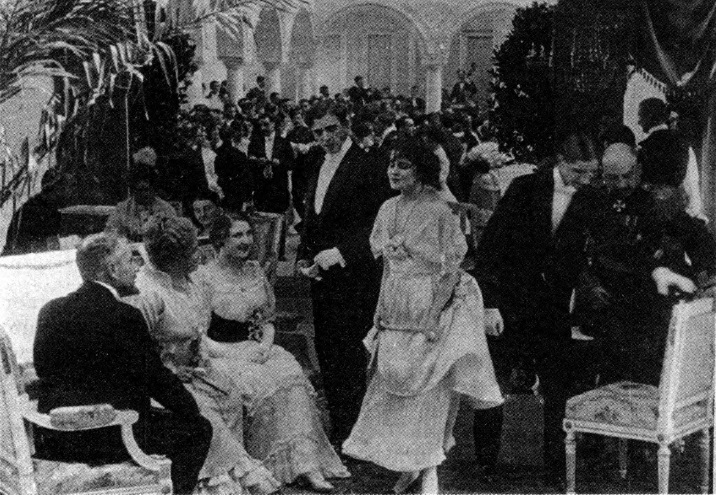
A scene from A Life for a Life which includes Rakhmanova

Olga Vladimirovna Rakhmanova (Ukrainian: Ольга Володимирівна Рахманова, Russian: Ольга Владимировна Рахманова; 1871 – 23 December 1943; married name Olga Vladimirovna Sokolova) was a Ukrainian and Russian stage and screen actress, screenwriter, director and teacher.

== Early life and education ==
Rakhmanova was born in Odesa, in present-day Ukraine but then in the Russian Empire, in 1871. She studied at the Drama School of the Russian Music Society there. She was married and had three children, but stopped using her married name before 1896.

== Career ==
Rakhmanova acted in semi-professional companies, before her professional acting debut in Vilnius, Lithuania in 1896. She acted and directed in theatre, ran a theatre school in Odesa, and in the 1910s moved to Moscow. Her first film role was in 1915 in Pyotr Chardynin's Mar'ia Lus'eva. She went on to play many roles as aunts or mothers of heroes or heroines, and in the 1916 A Life for a Life she shot her son-in-law. By 1916 she was already written of as "a wonderful grande dame" of Russian cinema.

Rakhmanova wrote, directed, and acted in the 1918 An Episode of Love, leading a contemporary critic, the pseudonymous "Ten", to write: "One feels that the new film director has a firm grip on her material, arranges mise-en-scènes clearly, and does not lose the action’s tempo. But the combination of author, actor, and director in one person hindered each of them individually".

She directed various films until in 1926 she was expelled from the Association for Revolutionary Cinema for "having nothing to do with revolutionary cinema". Thereafter she taught elocution at the Russian Institute of Theatre Arts (GITIS) in Moscow, and at the time of her death was working on a textbook of theatre, having already completed an unpublished book on phonetics and acting.

== Death ==
Olga Rakhmanova died on 23 December 1943 and is buried in section 10 of the Vvedenskoye Cemetery in Moscow.
