= A Life for a Life (1916 film) =

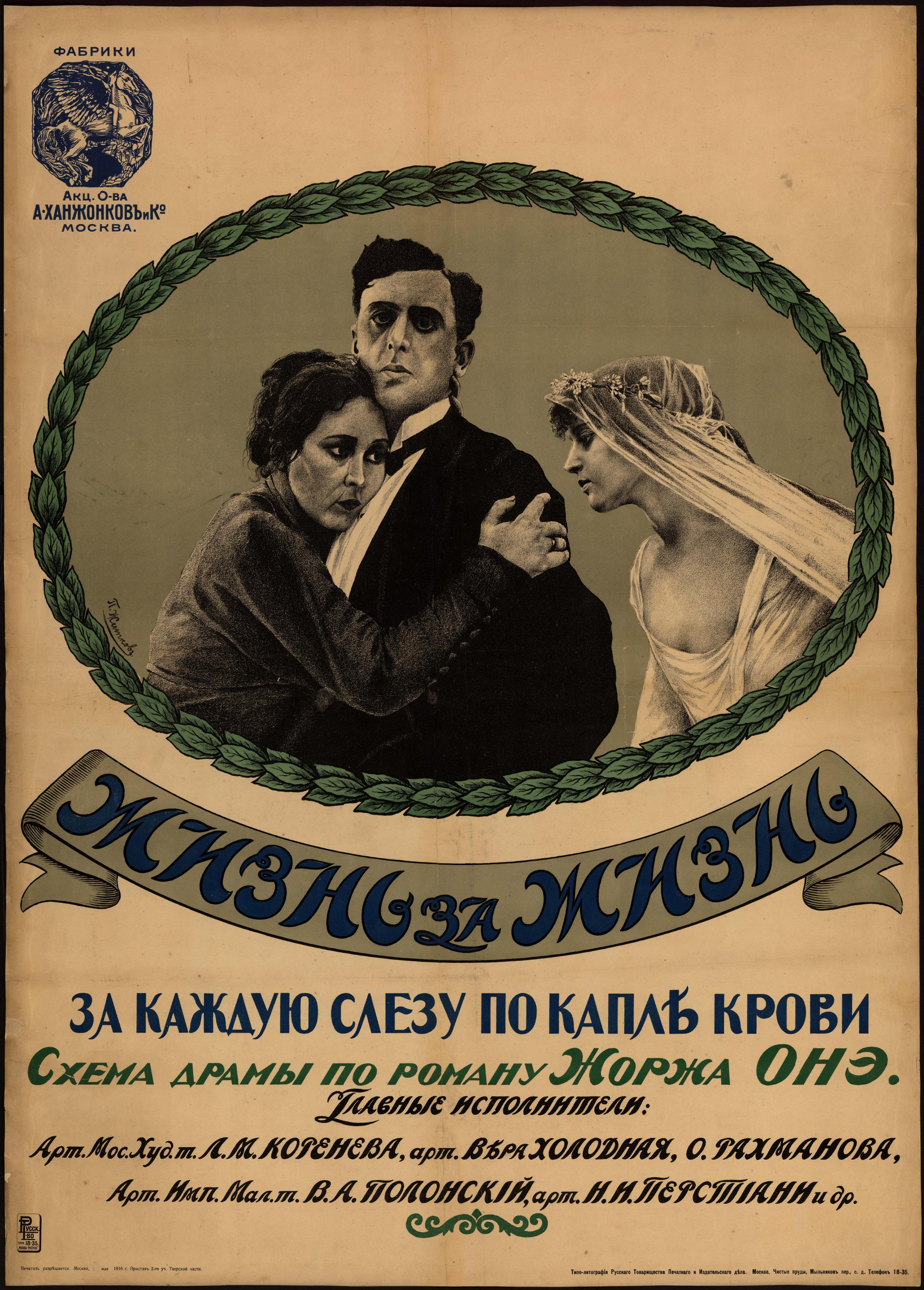
- Russian: Жизнь за жизнь
- Directed by: Yevgeni Bauer
- Written by: Georges Ohnet (novel); Yevgeni Bauer
- Starring: Olga Rakhmanova; Lidiya Koreneva; Vera Kholodnaya; Vitold Polonsky; Ivane Perestiani
- Cinematography: Boris Zavelev
- Release date: 1916
- Running time: 66 min
- Country: Russian Empire

A Life for a Life (Russian: Жизнь за жизнь, romanized: Zhizn za zhizn) is a 1916 drama film directed by Yevgeni Bauer.

== Plot ==
A Life for a Life (1916)

The film is based on Serge Panine, a novel by Georges Ohnet.

Mrs. Khromova, a wealthy mother to two daughters, the natural-born Musya and the adopted Nata. Zhurov, a merchant, longs to marry Nata, who is too careful to commit. The handsome but self-indulgent Prince Bartinsky is introduced to the family by Zhurov. The daughters quickly fall in love with the prince, who in turn falls in love with Nata. The prince is severely in debt, and seeks out a marriage with Musya instead, for her dowry. Nata and Zhurov marry. Meanwhile, a concerned Mrs. Khromova has doubts that Prince Bartinsky will change his ways.

== Starring ==
- Olga Rakhmanova as Mrs. Khromova
- Lidiya Koreneva as Musya Khromova
- Vera Kholodnaya as Nata Khromova
- Vitold Polonsky as Prince Vladimir Bartinsky
- Ivane Perestiani as Zhurov, the merchant
