= Willy Clever =

German actor and screenwriter

- Born: 11 August 1905; German Empire
- Died: December 1969 (aged 64)
- Occupations: Actor, screenwriter
- Years active: 1929–1961 (film)

Willy Clever (1905 in Elberfeld −1969) was a German actor and screenwriter. He worked on several multi-language versions at the Joinville Studios in Paris during the early years of sound.

== Selected filmography ==
- Spring Awakening (1929)
- Revolt in the Reformatory (1929)
- Witnesses Wanted (1930)
- The Man in the Dark (1930)
- Sunday of Life (1931)
- Every Woman Has Something (1931)
- Student Life in Merry Springtime (1931)
- The Sandwich Girl (1933)
- Miracle of Flight (1935)
- His Son (1942)
- Romance in a Minor Key (1943)
- Love Premiere (1943)
- A Heidelberg Romance (1951)

== Bibliography ==
- Marc Silberman. German Cinema: Texts in Context. Wayne State University Press, 1995.
