= Illusions (1930 film) =

1930 film

- Directed by: Lucien Mayrargue
- Starring: Pierre Batcheff; Mary Serta
- Release date: 1930
- Country: France
- Languages: Silent; French intertitles

Illusions is a 1930 French silent comedy film directed by Lucien Mayrargue and starring Pierre Batcheff, Mary Serta and Esther Kiss. It was released at a time when sound films were becoming dominant, and received bad reviews.

== Cast ==
- Pierre Batcheff
- Mary Serta
- Esther Kiss
- Gaston Jacquet
- Jean Joris
- Pola Illéry
- Ninon Bernard

== Bibliography ==
- Powrie, Phil & Rebillard, Éric. Pierre Batcheff and stardom in 1920s French cinema. Edinburgh University Press, 2009
