= Every Woman Has Something =

1931 film

- Directed by: Leo Mittler
- Written by: Herman J. Mankiewicz; Alice Duer Miller (play); Charlie Roellinghoff; A.E. Thomas (play)
- Starring: Trude Berliner; Willy Clever; Kurt Vespermann
- Cinematography: René Guissart
- Music by: Sam Coslow; W. Franke Harling; Gregor Skolnik
- Production company: Paramount Pictures
- Distributed by: Paramount Pictures
- Release date: March 20, 1931
- Running time: 85 minutes
- Country: United States
- Language: German

Every Woman Has Something (German: Jede Frau hat etwas) is a 1931 American comedy film directed by Leo Mittler and starring Trude Berliner, Willy Clever and Kurt Vespermann. It is the German-language version of the 1930 film Honey. Several other language versions were made, as was common in the early years of sound when multi-language versions were made to release in different countries.

== Cast ==
- Trude Berliner as Olivia Dangerfield
- Willy Clever as Burton
- Kurt Vespermann as Charles Dangerfield, Bruder
- Annie Ann as Cora Falkner, Tochter
- Ida Perry as Frau Falkner
- Karl Harbacher as Weeks
- Kurt Lilien as Williams, Privatdetektiv
- Zacharova as Mayme, Stubenmädchen
- Alexandra Nalder as Doris, ihre Tochter

== Bibliography ==
- Babett Stach & Helmut Morsbach. German film posters: 1895 - 1945. Walter de Gruyter, 1992.
