= Charles Méré =

French film director, screenwriter and playwright

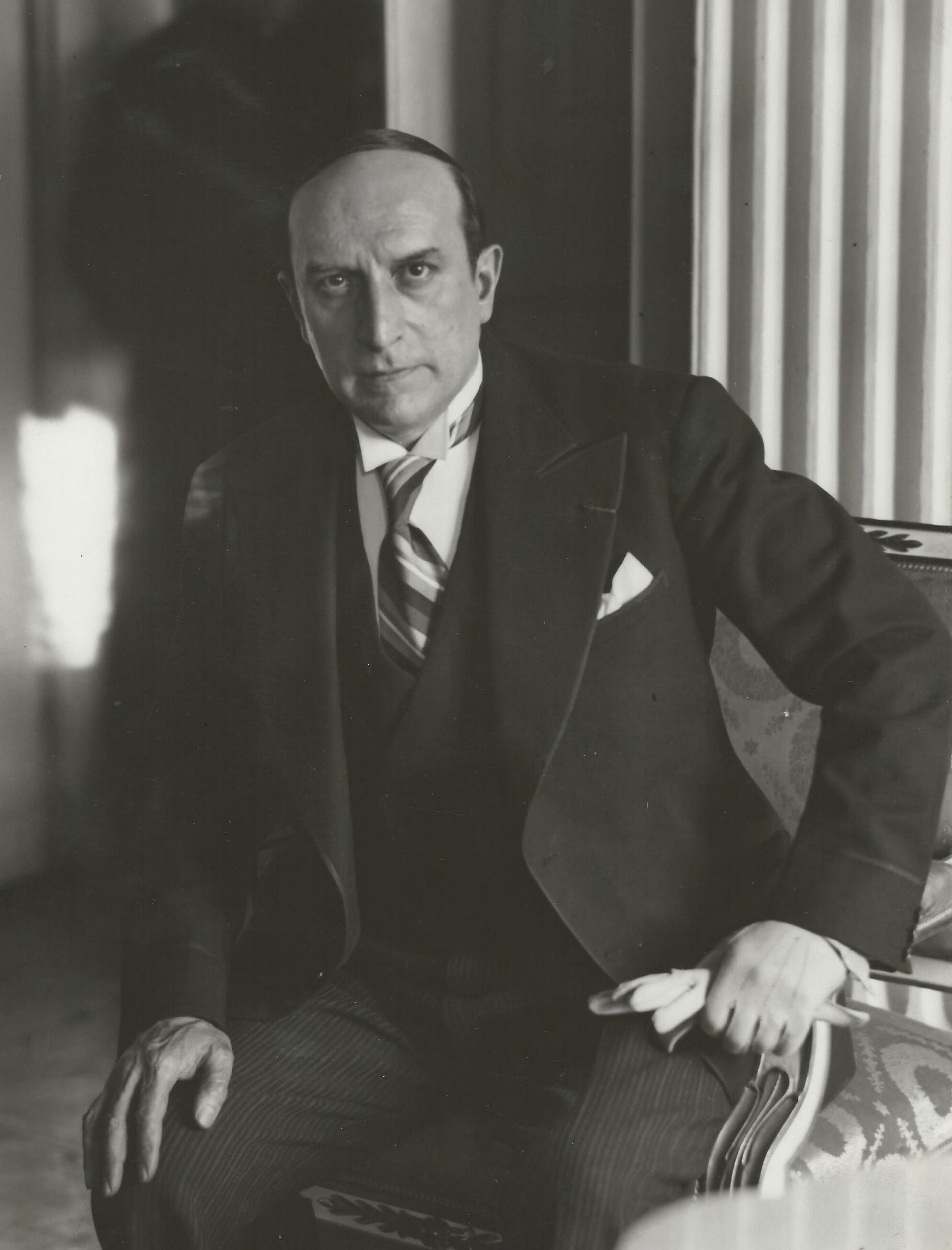
- Méré at the CISAC Congress in Warsaw (1934)
- Born: Auguste Charles Alexandre Méré; 29 January 1883; Marseille, France
- Died: 2 October 1970 (aged 87); Paris, France
- Occupations: Playwright, screenwriter, director

Charles Méré (29 January 1883 – 2 October 1970) was a French film director, screenwriter, and playwright.

== Biography ==
Méré was born in Marseille, France, and was president of the Société des Auteurs et Compositeurs Dramatiques (Society of Dramatic Authors and Composers, or SACD) from 1929 to 1944.

Méré was the author of 41 plays, including six for the Grand Guignol, and librettist of three lyrical dramas.

He co-produced two films and a couple of movies were made from his works.

== Selected filmography ==
- Les Trois Masques, directed by Henry Krauss (1921, based on the play Les Trois Masques)
- The Flame, directed by René Hervil (1926, based on the play La Flamme)
- Le Vertige, directed by Marcel L'Herbier (1926, based on the play Le Vertige)
- The Masked Woman, directed by Silvano Balboni (1927, based on the play La Femme masquée)
- Prince Jean, directed by René Hervil (1928, based on the play Le Prince Jean)
- Temptation, directed by René Barberis and René Leprince (1929, based on the play La Tentation)
- The Three Masks, directed by André Hugon (1929, based on the play Les Trois Masques)
- Prince Jean, directed by Jean de Marguenat (1934, based on the play Le Prince Jean)
- Vertigo, directed by Paul Schiller (1935, based on the play Le Vertige)
- The Flame, directed by André Berthomieu (1936, based on the play La Flamme)
- La Tentation, directed by Pierre Caron (1936, based on the play La Tentation)
- Fortuné de Marseille, directed by Henri Lepage and Pierre Méré (1952, based on the play Un Homme du Nord)
- Prisons de femmes, directed by Maurice Cloche (1958, based on the play Prisons de femmes)

=== Screenwriter ===
- Les Trois Lys (dir. Henri Desfontaines, 1921)
- Serge Panine (dir. Charles Méré and Paul Schiller, 1939)
- Fever (dir. Jean Delannoy, 1942)
- The Golden Age (dir. Jean de Limur, 1942)
- The Man Who Sold His Soul (dir. Jean-Paul Paulin, 1943)

=== Director ===
- Golden Venus (1938, co-director Jean Delannoy)
- Serge Panine (1939, co-director Paul Schiller )

=== Producer ===
- Fever (dir. Jean Delannoy, 1942)
- The Golden Age (dir. Jean de Limur, 1942)
- It Happened at the Inn (dir. Jacques Becker, 1943)
- The Last Judgment (dir. René Chanas, 1945)
- Toâ (1949)
