= Island of Love (1929 film) =

1929 film

- Directed by: Jean Durand; Berthe Dagmar
- Written by: Jean Durand; Saint-Orny (novel)
- Starring: Claude France; Pierre Batcheff; Thérèse Kolb
- Cinematography: Jacques Montéran; Maurice Velle
- Production company: Gaumont
- Release date: 15 April 1929
- Country: France
- Languages: Silent; French intertitles

Island of Love (French: L'île d'amour) is a 1929 French silent film directed by Berthe Dagmar and her husband Jean Durand and starring Claude France, Pierre Batcheff, and Thérèse Kolb.

== Plot ==
Xenia Smith, a wealthy young American vacationing in Corsica, meets Bicchi, an idler living in Ajaccio. After Xenia's uncle offers Bicchi money to stay away from her, he refuses. Bicchi is later accused of murdering his rival, Bozzi. To protect Xenia, who was with him at the time of the murder, he confesses to the crime until she provides an alibi and secures his release. Bozzi's brother continues to pursue Bicchi, eventually finding him in the mountains and shooting him as Xenia helps him escape. Bicchi survives his injuries and leaves Corsica with Xenia, promising to return to the island.

== Cast ==
- Claude France as Xénia Smith
- Pierre Batcheff as Bicchi
- Thérèse Kolb as La mère
- Victor Vina as Serlys
- Jean Garat as Harry Smith
- Aldo Rossano as Bozzi
- Yvonne Armor as La fiancée
- Harry Fleming as Le danseur
- Alice Roberts as La nurse
- Henri Duval as Le juge
- Berthe Dagmar as Une femme
- Guy Favières
- Earl Leslie
- Albert Lévy
- Mistinguett

== Bibliography ==
- Rège, Philippe. Encyclopedia of French Film Directors, Volume 1. Scarecrow Press, 2009.
