= Il padrone delle ferriere =

1959 Italian-Spanish historical melodrama film

- Spanish film poster
- Directed by: Anton Giulio Majano
- Written by: Anton Giulio Majano
- Story by: Georges Ohnet
- Starring: António Vilar; Virna Lisi; Wandisa Guida; Evi Maltagliati
- Cinematography: Mario Montuori
- Edited by: Nino Baragli
- Music by: Angelo Francesco Lavagnino
- Distributed by: Variety Distribution
- Release date: 11 March 1959 (Italy)
- Language: Italian

Il padrone delle ferriere (Spanish: Felipe Derblay, lit. The Master of the Ironworks) is a 1959 Italian-Spanish historical melodrama film written and directed by Anton Giulio Majano. It is based on the novel Le Maître de forges by Georges Ohnet.

== Cast ==
- António Vilar as Philippe Derblay
- Virna Lisi as Claire de Beaulieu
- Wandisa Guida as Athenaïs de Moulinet
- Evi Maltagliati as Marquise de Beaulieu
- Dario Michaelis as Gaston de Bligny
- Terence Hill as Octave de Beaulieu (as Mario Girotti)
- Cathia Caro as Suzanne Derblay
- Ivo Garrani as Monsieur Moulinet
- Susana Campos as Sophie de Préfont
- Guido Celano as Gobert
- Riccardo Fellini as Max de Tremblay
