= Montparnasse (film) =

1929 film

- Directed by: Eugène Deslaw
- Release date: 1929
- Country: France
- Language: Silent

Montparnasse is a French short documentary film, released in 1929, that was directed, filmed and produced by Eugène Deslaw, a Ukrainian filmmaker. The film is also known as Montparnasse: Poème du Café crème; Montparnasse ou le poème du café crème; Quatre Cafés.

== Content ==
A city symphony film that hones in on the specific Parisian district of Montparnasse. The film has countless shots of the mundane or ordinary, capturing everyday items and activities within the neighborhood of Montparnasse.

== Production ==
Many scenes capture shadows, different camera angles show the hustle and bustle of the city life on the street, art being created and sold in street markets, café culture, folks sharing a laugh and more. Some of the people featured in this film, Tsuguharu Foujita, Luigi Russolo, Luis Buñuel, and Yuki Katsura are said to have become famous afterwards according to Translucent being: Eugène Deslaw.

The entire film is in black and white and features many experimental camera movements and angles. Deslaw plays with tilted or skewed camera angles, several shots wipe into the next and there is no shortage of whips and pans in scenes.
