= Jules Walter =

Antiguan-born British actor and activist (1929–2025)

- Born: Jules Nesley Ronald Whitfield Walter; 20 July 1929; St John's, Antigua, British Leeward Islands
- Died: 20 June 2025 (aged 95); United Kingdom
- Occupations: Actor; activist
- Children: 3

Jules Nesley Ronald Whitfield Walter (20 July 1929 – 20 June 2025) was an Antiguan-born British actor and activist.

== Career ==
In his on-screen career, Walter primarily played smaller and uncredited parts across both film and television; when credited, his name was sometimes spelled as Jules Walters. He had appearances in four episodes of Spike Milligan's The Melting Pot, two appearances six years apart in Eric Sykes's self-titled television show and a Sea Devil warrior in the 1984 Doctor Who serial Warriors of the Deep, starring Peter Davison.

In film, he had a minor role in the 1978 action film The Wild Geese, as well as playing Rennek, a member of Jabba the Hutt's court of criminals, in Star Wars: Episode VI Return of the Jedi.

His final credited role was his second appearance in a James Bond film. In 1973, he played an aide to Yaphet Kotto's Kananga in Live and Let Die. Over a decade later, he played a business leader, part of Christopher Walken's cabal plotting to destroy Silicon Valley in 1985's A View to a Kill. These two films were the first and last in the franchise headlined by Walter's Wild Geese co-star Roger Moore.

Walter also performed extensively on-stage, including in 1972's The Black Macbeth, a version of Shakespeare's eponymous work adapted to an African setting and directed by Peter Coe. The production received positive-to-mixed reviews upon its debut at the Roundhouse Theatre in London, though it was work that Walter was personally proud of.

== Personal life ==
Walter was born on 20 July 1929 in St John's, Antigua, then part of the British Leeward Islands, to businessman Ronald Walter and seamstress Vioney Walter (née Edwards). His father died when he was 12, and he was raised by his grandmothers due to his mothers' search for work in the United States. In 1955 he travelled to London, and settled in the Notting Hill area, staying with his uncle Carl Walter, a musician and actor.

In addition to acting, Walter also modelled for Vogue and Vanity Fair, among other publications. Early in his life, he was also one of the first Black plantation managers in his native Antigua, a job he held for twelve years. During his life, Walter was deeply invested in the cause of social justice, working with the Edric Connor Agency (later the Afro-Asian-Caribbean Agency) and Negro Theatre Workshop (NTW) to help bolster the presence and perception of Black and minority actors and artists in the United Kingdom; he had a particular investment in supporting those from his native Caribbean. Stokley Carmichael, later known as Kwame Ture, also stayed with Walter while visiting London. According to his goddaughter, Yvette Williams, Walter wintered in Antigua beginning in the 1980s, utilising his time there to purchase and remodel the historically significant Coates Cottage, turning it into a cultural centre for native Antiguans.

Walter died on 20 June 2025, at the age of 95. He was survived by three children, three grandchildren and a great-grandchild.
