= Beyond the Street =

1929 film

- Film poster
- Directed by: Leo Mittler
- Written by: Willy Döll; Jan Fethke
- Produced by: Dimitri Roschanski
- Starring: Lissy Arna; Paul Rehkopf; Fritz Genschow; Sig Arno
- Cinematography: Friedl Behn-Grund
- Production company: Prometheus-Film
- Distributed by: Prometheus-Film
- Release date: 10 October 1929
- Running time: 93 minutes
- Country: Germany
- Languages: Silent; German intertitles

Beyond the Street (1929)

Beyond the Street (German: Jenseits der Straße) is a 1929 German silent drama film directed by Leo Mittler and starring Lissy Arna, Paul Rehkopf, and Fritz Genschow.

The film is in the Weimar tradition of "street films", which examined the lower-depths of society, and has become the film for which Mittler is best known, even though he had only been appointed to make it after another director had to withdraw. The film was produced by the left-wing Prometheus Film, a German subsidiary of the Soviet company Mezhrabpom-Film. The film is also known by the alternative title Harbor Drift.

== Preservation status ==
On June 1, 2014, the San Francisco Silent Film Festival presented a 35mm print of the film restored by the Bundesarchiv-Filmarchiv Berlin.

== Cast ==
- Lissy Arna as Die Dirne / The Prostitute
- Paul Rehkopf as Der Bettler / The Beggar
- Fritz Genschow as Der Arbeitsloser / The Unemployed man
- Sig Arno as Der Hehler / The Receiver
- Friedrich Gnaß as Der Matrose / The Sailor
- Margarete Kupfer as Die Wirtin / The Landlady
- Jean Toulout

== Bibliography ==
- Prawer, Siegbert Salomon (2005). Between Two Worlds: The Jewish Presence in German and Austrian Film, 1910–1933. New York: Berghahn Books. ISBN 978-1-84545-074-8.
