= The King of Paris (1930 German film) =

1930 film

- Directed by: Leo Mittler
- Written by: Curt J. Braun; Michel Linsky
- Produced by: Herman Millakowsky
- Starring: Iván Petrovich; Hanna Ralph; Hans Peppler
- Cinematography: Max Brink; Curt Courant
- Music by: Walter Goehr
- Production companies: Greenbaum-Film; Exculivités Jean de Merly S.A.
- Distributed by: Bavaria Film
- Release date: 25 July 1930
- Countries: Germany; France
- Language: German

The King of Paris (German: Der König von Paris) is a 1930 German comedy film directed by Leo Mittler and starring Iván Petrovich, Hanna Ralph and Hans Peppler. Leo Mittler also directed a separate French-language The King of Paris.

== Cast ==
- Iván Petrovich as Don Pedro d'Alvarez
- Hanna Ralph as Duchess of Marsignac
- Hans Peppler as Charles Rascol
- Hanna Waag as Lucienne
- Rolf von Goth as Henri
- Karl Etlinger
- Charles Puffy as Amoretti - Police Commissionary
- Erich Dunskus
- Hans Heinrich von Twardowski
- Paul Kemp
- Senta Söneland
- Herbert Grünbaum
- Yvette Darnys
- Steffi Bernhard

== See also ==
- The King of Paris (1923 film)

== Bibliography ==
- Murphy, Robert, ed. (2006). Directors in British and Irish Cinema: A Reference Companion. London: British Film Institute. ISBN 978-1-84457-126-0.
