= Serge Panine (1922 film) =

1922 film

- Directed by: Maurice de Marsan; Charles Maudru
- Written by: Georges Ohnet (novel); Charles Maudru
- Produced by: Maurice de Marsan
- Starring: Albert von Kersten; Dora Kaiser
- Cinematography: Hans Theyer
- Production company: Sascha-Film
- Distributed by: Etablissements Louis Aubert
- Release date: 29 September 1922
- Countries: Austria; France
- Languages: Silent; French intertitles

Serge Panine is a 1922 Austrian-French silent film directed by Maurice de Marsan and Charles Maudru and starring Albert von Kersten and Dora Kaiser. It is based on the novel of the same title by Georges Ohnet.

The film's sets were designed by Artur Berger.

== Cast ==
- Albert von Kersten as Serge Panine
- Willy Hendrichs
- François de Kerdec
- Gyula Szőreghy
- Paul Askonas
- Dora Kaiser as Jeanne de Cerny
- Violette Jyl as Micheline
- Suzanne Munte as Madame Desvarennes
- Franz Kammauf

== Bibliography ==
- Goble, Alan. The Complete Index to Literary Sources in Film. Walter de Gruyter, 1999.
