= The Ironmaster (1933 film) =

1933 film

- Film poster
- Directed by: Abel Gance; Fernand Rivers
- Written by: Abel Gance; Fernand Rivers
- Story by: Georges Ohnet
- Starring: Gaby Morlay
- Cinematography: Georges Lucas; Harry Stradling
- Edited by: Mildred Johnston
- Release date: 30 November 1933
- Running time: 98 minutes
- Country: France
- Language: French

The Ironmaster (French: Le Maître de forges) is a 1933 French drama film scripted and supervised by Abel Gance, and directed by Fernand Rivers. It is a remake of the 1912 film Le Maître de forges. In 1948 Rivers himself remade the film.

== Cast ==
- Gaby Morlay as Claire de Beaulieu
- Léon Belières as Monsieur Moulinet
- Paule Andral as Marquise de Beaulieu
- Jacques Dumesnil as Gaston de Bligny
- Henri Rollan as Philippe Derblay
- Rivers Cadet as Baron de Prefont
- Christiane Delyne as Athenais de Moulinet
- Ghislaine Bru as Suzanne Derblay
- Guy Parzy as Octave de Beaulieu
- Irma Génin as Baronne de Prefont
- Jean Dulac
- Jane Marken
- Marcel Maupi
