= The King of Paris (1930 French-language film) =

1930 film

- Directed by: Leo Mittler
- Written by: Curt J. Braun; Georges Dolley; Michel Linsky; Georges Ohnet (novel)
- Produced by: Jean de Merly
- Starring: Iván Petrovich; Marie Glory; Pierre Batcheff
- Cinematography: Max Brink; Curt Courant
- Music by: Walter Goehr
- Production companies: Greenbaum-Film; Exculivités Jean de Merly S.A.
- Release date: 1930
- Countries: France; Germany
- Language: French

The King of Paris (French: Le roi de Paris) is a 1930 French-German film directed by Leo Mittler and starring Iván Petrovich, Marie Glory and Pierre Batcheff. It is the French-language version of the German film The King of Paris, part of a trend of making multi-language versions during the early years of sound.

== Cast ==
- Iván Petrovich
- Marie Glory
- Pierre Batcheff
- Suzanne Bianchetti
- Gabriel Gabrio as Rascol
- Pierre Juvenet
- Marthe Sarbel

== See also ==
- The King of Paris (1923 film)

== Bibliography ==
- Murphy, Robert, ed. (2006). Directors in British and Irish Cinema: A Reference Companion. British Film Institute. ISBN 978-1-84457-126-0.
