= Berthe Dagmar =

French film actress

- Born: 1884, January 24; Agon-Coutainville, France
- Died: 1934, January 20; Paris, France
- Occupation: Actress
- Years active: 1910–1929 (film)

Berthe Dagmar (1884–1934) was a French film actress. She was married to the director Jean Durand.

== Selected filmography ==
- Island of Love (1929)

== Bibliography ==
- Rège, Philippe. Encyclopedia of French Film Directors, Volume 1. Scarecrow Press, 2009.
