= Serge Panine (1939 film) =

- Directed by: Charles Méré; Paul Schiller
- Written by: Charles Méré; Georges Ohnet (novel); Paul Schiller
- Produced by: André Paulvé
- Starring: Françoise Rosay; Pierre Renoir; Andrée Guize
- Cinematography: André Dantan
- Edited by: Roger Spiri-Mercaton
- Music by: Michel Michelet
- Production company: Les Productions Françaises Cinématographiques
- Distributed by: DisCina
- Release date: 20 January 1939
- Country: France
- Language: French

Serge Panine is a 1939 French drama film directed by Charles Méré and Paul Schiller and starring Françoise Rosay, Pierre Renoir and Andrée Guize. It was based on a novel of the same title by Georges Ohnet.

The film's art direction was by Émile Duquesne.

== Cast ==
- Françoise Rosay as Madame Devarenne
- Pierre Renoir as Cayrol
- Andrée Guize as Jeanne
- Sylvia Bataille as Micheline
- Youcca Troubetzkov as Serge Panine
- Lucien Rozenberg as Duc
- Denise Grey as Lady Harton
- Jacques Henley as Lord Harton
- Claude Lehmann as Pierre
- Elisa Ruis

== Bibliography ==
- Goble, Alan. The Complete Index to Literary Sources in Film. Walter de Gruyter, 1999.
