= Paul Schiller (screenwriter) =

Czech screenwriter

- Born: 11 July 1903; Prague, Austria-Hungary
- Died: 19 September 1977 (aged 74); Los Angeles, California, United States
- Occupations: Screenwriter, director
- Years active: 1929–1940

Paul Schiller (11 July 1903 – 19 September 1977) was a Czech screenwriter.

== Career ==
Schiller was active in the German the French film industries during the 1930s. He also directed two films. He worked on a single British film The Street Singer in 1937. In 1940 he left German-occupied Europe and sailed on the liner Serpa Pinto from Lisbon to New York. Hollywood star Hedy Lamarr bought the rights to one of his stories, but objections from the Hays Office led her to make numerous changes and the 1947 film Dishonored Lady that resulted had little resemblance to his story.

== Selected filmography ==
- Call of the Blood (1929)
- Marriage Strike (1930)
- Make-Up (1932)
- The Naked Truth (1932)
- Nothing But Lies (1933)
- Number 33 (1933)
- The Porter from Maxim's (1933)
- Mam'zelle Spahi (1934)
- Prince Jean (1934)
- Vertigo (1935)
- Speak to Me of Love (1935)
- The Last Waltz (1936)
- The Street Singer (1937)
- The Two Schemers (1938)
- Serge Panine (1939)
- Marseille mes amours (1940)
