= Charles Maudru =

French film director

- Born: 31 March 1859; Saint-Rémy-aux-Bois, France
- Died: 17 February 1935 (aged 75); Paris
- Occupation: Director
- Years active: 1911-1924 (film)

Charles Maudru (1859-1935) was a French film director of the silent era. He was the father of the screenwriter Pierre Maudru.

== Selected filmography ==
- Serge Panine (1922)
- The King of Paris (1923)
- The Loves of Rocambole (1924)

== Bibliography ==
- Goble, Alan. The Complete Index to Literary Sources in Film. Walter de Gruyter, 1999.
