= Maurice de Marsan =

French poet, novelist, film director and screenwriter

- Born: 1852; Bordeaux
- Died: 29 April 1929; Paris
- Occupation(s): Film director, screenwriter

Maurice de Marsan (1852 in Bordeaux - 29 April 1929 in Paris) was a French poet, novelist, film director and screenwriter. He was active in the early 20th-century French literary and cinematic scenes. His work spanned multiple creative fields.

== Filmography (selection) ==
- 1909 : J'épouserai ma cousine
- 1921 : Le Traquenard
- 1921 : L’Assommoir
- Serge Panine (1922)
- The King of Paris (1923)
- 1923 : La Nuit rouge
- 1924 : la Main qui a tué
- 1925 : La Justicière

== Liens external links ==
- Maurice de Marsan at IMDb
- 24 films liés à Maurice de Marsan sur CinéRessources.net
- Maurice de Marsan on Data.bnf.fr
