= Leo Mittler =

Austrian playwright, screenwriter and film director (1893–1958)

- Born: 18 December 1893; Vienna, Austro-Hungarian Empire
- Died: 16 May 1958 (aged 64); West Berlin, West Germany
- Occupations: Playwright, screenwriter, film director
- Years active: 1926 - 1958

Leo Mittler (18 December 1893 – 16 May 1958) was an Austrian playwright, screenwriter and film director. Mittler was born in Vienna to a Jewish family. He attended the University of Music and Performing Arts and worked as a playwright and director in the German theatre. Mittler then switched to work in the German film industry during the silent era.

Mittler's best known film as director was Beyond the Street (1929), a "street film" influenced by Soviet cinema. Mittler also spent time at the American company Paramount's French subsidiary based at the Joinville Studios in Paris.

Following the Nazi rise to power in 1933, Mittler spent many years in exile in several countries, including Britain and France, before settling in the United States during the Second World War. Mittler's career as a director had all but ended in the mid-1930s, after making the Stanley Lupino musical comedy Cheer Up (1936), but he worked occasionally as a screenwriter.

Mittler wrote the original story of the MGM pro-Soviet film Song of Russia (1944) which was later investigated by the House Un-American Activities Committee for its alleged communist sympathies. Mittler returned to Germany post-war, dying there in 1958. Before his death, he worked in German theatre and television.

== Selected filmography ==
=== Director ===
- We'll Meet Again in the Heimat (1926)
- Serenissimus and the Last Virgin (1928)
- Beyond the Street (1929)
- There Is a Woman Who Never Forgets You (1930)
- The King of Paris (1930, German)
- The King of Paris (1930, French)
- Tropical Nights (1931)
- The Incorrigible (1931)
- The Concert (1931)
- Sunday of Life (1931)
- Every Woman Has Something (1931)
- Reckless Youth (1931)
- The Leap into the Void (1932)
- The Night at the Hotel (1932)
- Nights in Port Said (1932)
- The Faceless Voice (1933)
- Honeymoon for Three (1935)
- The Last Waltz (1936)
- Cheer Up (1936)

=== Screenwriter ===
- Sixteen Daughters and No Father (1928)
- The Mayor's Dilemma (1939)
- The Ghost Ship (1943)
- Song of Russia (1944)

== Bibliography ==
- Mayhew, Robert. Ayn Rand And Song Of Russia: Communism And Anti-Communism in 1940s Hollywood. Scarecrow Press, 2005.
- Prawer, S.S. Between Two Worlds: The Jewish Presence in German and Austrian Film, 1910-1933. Berghahn Books, 2005.
