= The King of Paris (1923 film) =

1923 film

- Directed by: Maurice de Marsan; Charles Maudru
- Written by: Georges Ohnet (novel)
- Starring: Jean Dax; Suzanne Munte; Germaine Vallier
- Cinematography: André Dantan
- Production company: Etablissements Louis Aubert
- Release date: 1923
- Country: France
- Languages: Silent; French intertitles

The King of Paris (French: Le roi de Paris) is a 1923 French silent film directed by Maurice de Marsan and Charles Maudru and starring Jean Dax, Suzanne Munte and Germaine Vallier. The film was remade in 1930.

== Cast ==
- Jean Dax as Clavel de Larroque
- Suzanne Munte as Duchesse de Diernstein
- Germaine Vallier as Lucienne Marchal
- Jean Peyrière as Jean Hiénard
- Maurice Thorèze as Roger Brémont
- Olga Noël as Juliette
- Claire Prémore as Clémence Herbillon
- Jacqueline Arly as Fanny
- Léon Lorin as Amoretti
- Jules de Spoly as Devienne
- Madame de Wardemer as Madame de Sauvelys
- Martin as Herbillon
- Pierre Batcheff
- Maggy Delval as Mélanie Lascart
- Louis Mafer as Frégose

== Bibliography ==
- Goble, Alan. The Complete Index to Literary Sources in Film. Walter de Gruyter, 1999.
