= The Ironmaster (1948 film) =

- Directed by: Fernand Rivers
- Written by: Georges Ohnet (play); Fernand Rivers
- Produced by: Fernand Rivers
- Starring: Hélène Perdrière; Jean Chevrier; Jeanne Provost
- Cinematography: Jean Bachelet
- Edited by: Yvonne Martin
- Music by: Henri Verdun
- Release date: 17 March 1948
- Country: France
- Language: French

The Ironmaster (French: Le maître de forges) is a 1948 French drama film directed by Fernand Rivers and starring Hélène Perdrière, Jean Chevrier and Jeanne Provost.

The film's sets were designed by the art directors Robert Giordani and René Renoux.

== Cast ==
- Hélène Perdrière as Claire de Beaulieu
- Jean Chevrier as Philippe Derblay
- Jeanne Provost as Marquise de Beaulieu
- Luce Feyrer as Athénais Moulinet
- Marcel Vallée as Moulinet
- François Richard as Duc de Bligny

== Bibliography ==
- Goble, Alan. The Complete Index to Literary Sources in Film. Walter de Gruyter, 1999.
