= Princess Turandot (film) =

1934 film

- German film poster
- German: Prinzessin Turandot
- Directed by: Gerhard Lamprecht
- Written by: Thea von Harbou
- Produced by: Günther Stapenhorst
- Starring: Käthe von Nagy; Willy Fritsch
- Cinematography: Fritz Arno Wagner
- Edited by: Arnfried Heyne
- Music by: Franz Doelle
- Production company: UFA
- Distributed by: UFA
- Release date: 30 November 1934
- Running time: 82 minutes
- Country: Germany
- Language: German

Princess Turandot (German: Prinzessin Turandot) is a 1934 German comedy film directed by Gerhard Lamprecht and starring Käthe von Nagy and Willy Fritsch. A separate French-language version, Turandot, Princess of China, was also released.

The script is by Thea von Harbou. It was shot at the Babelsberg Studios in Berlin. The film sets were designed by the art directors Robert Herlth and Walter Röhrig. The music was by Franz Doelle with song lyrics by Bruno Balz and C. Amberg (including the opening Turandot, bezaubernde Turandot - 'enchanting Turandot'), and the sound engineer was Dr. Fritz Seidel.

== Cast ==
- Willi Schaeffers as The Emperor
- Leopoldine Konstantin as The Empress
- Käthe von Nagy as Princess Turandot
- Inge List as Mian Li
- Willy Fritsch as Kalaf, the bird-dealer
- Paul Kemp as Willibald
- Aribert Wäscher as the judge
- Paul Heidemann as Prince of Samarkand
- Gerhard Dammann as executioner
- Ernst Behmer as the fruit dealer
- Edlef Schauer as the barber's clerk
- Angelo Ferrari
- Rudolf Biebrach
- Gaston Briese
- Alexander Engel
- Willi Grill
- Karl Hannemann
- Karl Hellmer
- Eduard Kandl
- Werner Kepich
- Bertold Reissig
- Hans Sternberg
