= Homecoming (1941 film) =

- Directed by: Gustav Ucicky
- Written by: Gerhard Menzel
- Based on: Heimkehr; 1941 novel by Karl Hans
- Produced by: Karl Hartl, Wien-Film
- Starring: Paula Wessely; Attila Hörbiger; Carl Raddatz
- Cinematography: Günther Anders
- Edited by: Rudolf Schaad
- Music by: Willy Schmidt-Gentner
- Distributed by: Universum Film AG
- Release dates: 10 October 1941 (Vienna); 23 October 1941 (Berlin)
- Running time: 96 minutes
- Country: Germany
- Language: German
- Budget: 4.02 million ℛℳ
- Box office: 4.9 million ℛℳ

Homecoming (German: Heimkehr) is a 1941 Nazi German anti-Polish propaganda film directed by Gustav Ucicky. Filled with heavy-handed caricature, it justifies extermination of Poles with a depiction of relentless persecution of ethnic Germans, who escape death only because of the German invasion.

== Plot ==
In the Wołyń Voivodeship in eastern Poland, the German minority is oppressed by the Polish majority. The physician Dr. Thomas does not have any hospital available and his daughter Marie, who teaches at a German school, and needs an important operation, watches when her school is seized by Polish authorities and demolished by an angry mob. Dr. Thomas protests to the mayor, noting the constitutionally guaranteed minority rights; however his protest falls on deaf ears. Marie and her fiancé, Dr. Fritz Mutius, drive to the provincial capital, in order to put their protest to the Voivode (governor), but they are not even received there either. Deciding to stay in the capital in order to call on the court the next day, that evening they go to the cinema. They are accompanied there by her friend Karl Michalek, who has been pressed into service by the Polish Army. When they refuse to sing the Polish national anthem Mazurek Dąbrowskiego with the rest of the audience, Fritz gets grievously hurt by the furious Polish crowd. Marie tries to take her betrothed to a hospital, but he is refused admission and succumbs to his injuries.

Back home, the acts of violence against the German minority continue to increase: Marie's father too becomes the victim of a Polish attack and is blinded as a result; the wife of innkeeper Ludwig Launhardt, Martha, dies after being struck by stones thrown by Poles. When during the Invasion of Poland the German villagers meet secretly in a barn, in order to hear Hitler's speech of 1 September 1939 before the Reichstag, they are discovered, arrested and imprisoned. Marie keeps up their spirits with the promise that they will escape, that Germans are deeply concerned about them, and that they will be able to return home and hear neither Yiddish nor Polish, but only German. They are abused by the prison guards, but escape through an underground cellar and, scarcely avoiding a massacre, are saved by invading Wehrmacht soldiers. The German escapees ready for their resettlement into the "homeland", while widowed Ludwig Launhardt asks for Marie's hand. At the end of the film the German trek crosses the border into the Reich. The conclusion shows an enormous picture of Hitler set up at the checkpoint.

== Cast ==
- Paula Wessely as Maria Thomas
- Peter Petersen as Dr. Thomas
- Attila Hörbiger as Ludwig Launhardt
- Ruth Hellberg as Martha Launhardt
- Carl Raddatz as Dr. Fritz Mutius
- Otto Wernicke as Old Manz
- Elsa Wagner as Frau Schmid
- Eduard Köck as Herr Schmid
- Franz Pfaudler as Balthasar Manz
- Gerhild Weber as Josepha Manz
- Werner Fuetterer as Oskar Friml
- Hermann Erhardt as Karl Michalek
- Berta Drews as Elfriede
- Eugen Preiß as Salomonson
- Boguslaw Samborski as Bürgermeister

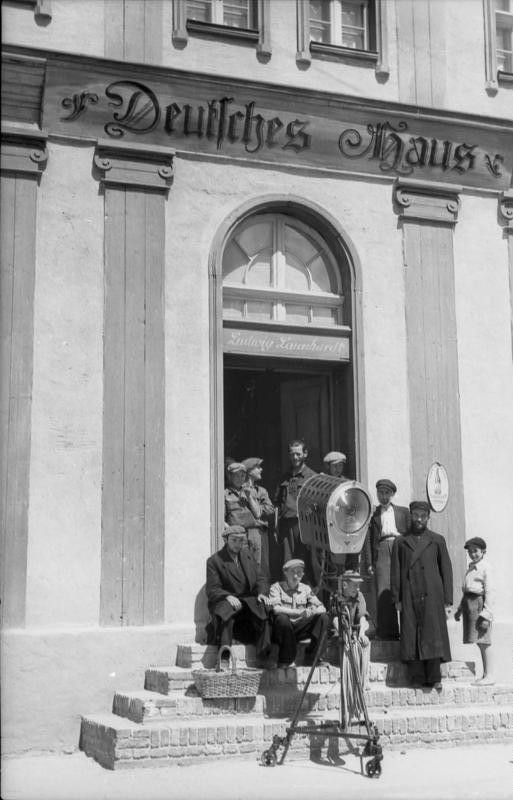
Filming in Poland, 1941

Casting for the minor parts played by Jewish and Polish actors was done by Igo Sym, who during the filming was shot in his Warsaw apartment by members of the Polish Union of Armed Struggle resistance movement. After the war, the Polish performers were punished (ranging from official reprimand to prison sentence) for collaboration in an anti-Polish propaganda undertaking.

== Historical context ==
Hitler intended Poland to serve as the Lebensraum for the German people, and declared that only the soil, not the people, could be Germanized. This did not mean a total extermination of all people there, as Eastern Europe was regarded as having people of Aryan/Nordic descent, particularly among their leaders. Germanisation began with the classification of people suitable as defined on the Nazi Volksliste, and treated according to their categorisation. Those unfit for Germanisation were to be expelled from the areas marked out for German settlement; those who resisted Germanization were to be sent to concentration camps or executed.

To foment support, Nazi propaganda presented the annexation as necessary to protect the German minorities there. Alleged massacres of Germans, such as Bloody Sunday were used in such propaganda, and Homecoming drew on such attempts although allowing the Volksdeutsche characters depicted to survive. The introduction explicitly states that hundreds of thousands of Germans in Poland suffered likewise. Many terror tactics depicted were those used by the Nazis themselves against minorities.

Similar treatment was given to anti-Serbian propaganda, in Menschen im Sturm.

Baltic Germans were also to be settled into this land. The secret supplementary protocol to the 1939 Molotov–Ribbentrop Pact included a resettlement plan by which approximately 60,000 ethnic Germans were resettled into the Reich. Nazi propaganda included using scare tactics about the Soviet Union, and led to tens of thousands leaving. After racial evaluation, they were divided into groups: A, Altreich, who were to be settled in Germany and allowed neither farms nor business (to allow for closer watch), S Sonderfall, who were used as forced labor, and O Ost-Falle, the best classification, to be settled in the Eastern Wall—the occupied regions, to protect German from the East—and allowed independence. Similar support therefore was fomented with the use of film to depict Baltic and Volga Germans as persecuted by the Bolshevists, such as the films Frisians in Peril, Flüchtlinge, and The Red Terror.

== Production ==
Gustav Ucicky and Gerhard Menzel were inspired to make Homecoming after receiving accounts of Volhynian Germans coming to Germany from Soviet-occupied Poland. Ucicky and Menzel previously made Refugees.

The set locations were chosen in late August and early September 1940 by a Wien-Film delegation, which toured occupied Poland in the company of Lieutenant Wilhelm Hosenfeld, an Abwehr operative at the Warsaw garrison. Production started in September 1940, and cost 4.02 million ℛℳ (equivalent to $17,258,107 in 2021).

The indoor shots ran from 2 January to the middle of July 1941 in the Wien-Film studios at the Rosenhügel in Liesing, at Sievering Studios and the Schönbrunn Palace gardens in Vienna. The external shots took place between February and June 1941 in Polish Chorzele and Ortelsburg (Szczytno) in East Prussia. The picture was submitted to censorship at the Film Review Office on 26 August 1941, it was G-rated and received a top attribute as "political and artistical particularly valuable".

== Release ==
Homecoming was approved by the censors on 26 August 1941, and shown at the Venice Film Festival on 10 October. It premiered in Berlin on 23 October. It received the rare honor "Film of the Nation" in Nazi Germany, bestowed on films considered to have made an outstanding contribution to the national cause. It earned 4,900,000 ℛℳ (equivalent to $21,036,001 in 2021) at the box office resulting in a loss of 423,000 ℛℳ (equivalent to $1,815,965 in 2021).

The film grossed 4.9 million Reichsmark. Nevertheless, Propaganda Minister Joseph Goebbels in his diary referred to Wessely's performance in the prison scene as "the best ever filmed". After the end of World War II the Allies banned any showing of the film. Director Ucicky was also banned from working, although this ban was waived by Austria in July 1947, whereafter he resorted to the Heimatfilm genre. Paula Wessely and her husband Attila Hörbiger became the acclaimed dream couple of the Vienna Burgtheater ensemble. The Austrian author and Nobel laureate Elfriede Jelinek stated that Homecoming is “the worst propaganda feature of the Nazis ever”. She utilized some text fragments in her 1985 play Burgtheater. Posse mit Gesang, causing a major public scandal. The film's rights are held by Taurus Film GmbH.

The Supreme Headquarters Allied Expeditionary Force's report on the film stated that the film was meant "to show that Germany had no choice but to save the German minority from persecution by declaring war on the Poles" and "to give the main figures an opportunity for making Nazi speeches".

== See also ==
- Nazism and cinema

== Works cited ==
- Welch, David (1983). Propaganda and the German Cinema: 1933-1945. I.B. Tauris. ISBN 9781860645204.
