= Joan of Arc (1935 film) =

1935 film

- Scene from a film
- German: Das Mädchen Johanna
- Directed by: Gustav Ucicky
- Written by: Gerhard Menzel
- Produced by: Bruno Duday
- Starring: Angela Salloker; Gustaf Gründgens; Heinrich George
- Cinematography: Günther Krampf
- Edited by: Eduard von Borsody
- Music by: Peter Kreuder
- Production company: UFA
- Distributed by: UFA
- Release date: 26 April 1935
- Running time: 87 minutes
- Country: Germany
- Language: German

Joan of Arc (German: Das Mädchen Johanna) is a 1935 German historical drama film directed by Gustav Ucicky and starring Angela Salloker, Gustaf Gründgens and Heinrich George. It depicts the life of Joan of Arc, and is the first female embodiment of the Nazi Führer figure in film. The press in Germany and abroad detected direct parallels between the presentation of France in 1429 and the situation in Germany in 1935.

It was shot at the Babelsberg Studios in Berlin. The film's sets were designed by the art directors Robert Herlth and Walter Röhrig.

== Cast ==
- Angela Salloker as Johanna
- Gustaf Gründgens as King Charles VII
- Heinrich George as Herzog von Burgund
- René Deltgen as Maillezais
- Erich Ponto as Lord Talbot
- Willy Birgel as La Trémouille
- Theodor Loos as Dunois
- Aribert Wäscher as Alençon
- Franz Nicklisch as Johann von Metz
- Veit Harlan as Pierre
- Paul Bildt as citizen
- Bernhard Minetti as Amtmann
- S. O. Schoening as Pater
- Friedrich Ulmer as Captain
- Fritz Genschow as Captain
- Paul Wagner as Herald
- Karl Dannemann as English soldier
- Wera Liessem as girl in the crowd
- Maria Koppenhöfer as woman in the crowd
- Elsa Wagner as woman in the crowd
- Josef Sieber as man at the coronation

== Production ==
The film was directed by Gustav Ucicky and written by Gerhard Menzel.

== Release ==
The New York Board of Censors removed the phrases "venereal disease", "bastard", "Holy Virgin Mary", "stallion", "by God", and "cursed" from the subtitles before it was shown in the United States.

== Reception ==
Writing for The Spectator in 1935, British writer Graham Greene criticized the film for historical inaccuracies (like Joan's rescue of Charles VII at Orléans rather than meeting at Chinon), as well as for what he called its "Nazi psychology" (including the "heavily underlined" political parallels between the June 30 purge and that of Trémoille, and between the Reichstag fire and the execution of Joan in Rouen). Greene described the overall effect to be dull and noisy, and described the direction as "terribly sincere, conveying a kind of blond and shaven admiration for poor lonely dictators who have been forced to eliminate their allies."

== Works cited ==
- Waldman, Harry (2008). Nazi Films In America, 1933-1942. McFarland & Company. ISBN 9780786438617.
