= Night in May =

1934 film

- French: Nuit de mai
- Directed by: Henri Chomette; Gustav Ucicky; Raoul Ploquin
- Written by: Jacques Bousquet; Henri Chomette; Stephan Kamare (play); Gerhard Menzel; Gustav Ucicky
- Produced by: Günther Stapenhorst
- Starring: Käthe von Nagy; Fernand Gravey; Annie Ducaux
- Cinematography: Friedl Behn-Grund
- Edited by: Eduard von Borsody
- Music by: Alois Melichar
- Production companies: UFA; ACE
- Distributed by: ACE
- Release date: 12 October 1934
- Running time: 85 minutes
- Countries: France; Germany
- Language: French

Night in May (French: Nuit de mai) is a 1934 French-German comedy film directed by Henri Chomette, Gustav Ucicky and Raoul Ploquin. It starred Käthe von Nagy, Fernand Gravey and Annie Ducaux. It is the French-language version of UFA's The Young Baron Neuhaus. Such multi-language versions were common during the early years of sound film before dubbing became more widespread.

The film's sets were designed by the art directors Robert Herlth and Walter Röhrig.

== Plot ==
Baron Neuhaus is in charge of police matters at the court of Maria Theresa. He is tasked with searching for a man who gained access to the home of Countess Christel. But the case is actually about himself, who entered the residence to thank the Countess's maid.

== Cast ==
- Käthe von Nagy as Countess Christel Palm
- Fernand Gravey as Baron Neuhaus
- Annie Ducaux as Empress Marie-Thérèse
- Monette Dinay as Toni
- Lucien Baroux as Monsieur Stockel
- Marguerite Templey as Madame Stockel
- Katia Lova as Josefa
- Alexandre Rignault as Gaysberger
- Lucien Dayle as Leiner
- Georges Morton as judge
- Raoul Marco as sergeant
- Raymond Aimos as Stumm
- Jean Bara
- Lilian Claude Barghon as the little girl
- Jeanne de Carol
- Henri Chomette
- Dina Cocea
- Eugène Dumas
- Fernand Frey
- Micheline Masson
- Pierre Piérade
- Philippe Richard
- Sinoël
