= Robert Herlth =

German art director

- Born: 2 May 1893; Wriezen, Brandenburg, German Empire
- Died: 6 January 1962 (aged 68); Munich, Bavaria, West Germany
- Occupation: Art director
- Years active: 1920-1962 (film)

Robert Herlth (2 May 1893 – 6 January 1962) was a German art director. He was one of the leading designers of German film sets during the 1920s and 1930s.

== Filmography ==
- Masks (1920)
- Island of the Dead (1921)
- The Secret of Bombay (1921)
- The Devil's Chains (1921)
- Destiny (1921)
- Playing with Fire (1921)
- Wandering Souls (1921)
- Parisian Women (1921)
- Miss Julie (1922)
- Madame de La Pommeraye's Intrigues (1922)
- Luise Millerin (1922)
- The Earl of Essex (1922)
- The Treasure (1923)
- Comedy of the Heart (1924)
- The Last Laugh (1924)
- The Chronicles of the Gray House (1925)
- Tartuffe (1926)
- Faust (1926)
- Luther (1928)
- Looping the Loop (1928)
- Whirl of Youth (1928)
- Four Devils (1928)
- Asphalt (1929)
- The Wonderful Lies of Nina Petrovna (1929)
- Manolescu (1929)
- The Flute Concert of Sanssouci (1930)
- The Temporary Widow (1930)
- Hocuspocus (1930)
- A Student's Song of Heidelberg (1930)
- Love's Carnival (1930)
- The Immortal Vagabond (1930)
- Calais-Dover (1931)
- The Man in Search of His Murderer (1931)
- The Little Escapade (1931)
- Yorck (1931)
- In the Employ of the Secret Service (1931)
- The Countess of Monte Cristo (1932)
- Congress Dances (1932)
- Man Without a Name (1932)
- The Black Hussar (1932)
- Waltz War (1933)
- Court Waltzes (1933)
- The Only Girl (1933)
- Morgenrot (1933)
- Season in Cairo (1933)
- Refugees (1933)
- The Empress and I (1933)
- Night in May (1934)
- The Eternal Dream (1934)
- The Csardas Princess (1934)
- Princess Turandot (1934)
- Au bout du monde (1934)
- The Young Baron Neuhaus (1934)
- Joan of Arc (1935)
- Amphitryon (1935)
- Les dieux s'amusent (1935)
- Barcarole (1935)
- Rêve éternel (1935)
- The Royal Waltz (1935)
- Under Blazing Heavens (1936)
- Royal Waltz (1936)
- Savoy Hotel 217 (1936)
- Hans im Glück (1936)
- The Ruler (1937)
- The Broken Jug (1937)
- You and I (1938)
- The Gambler (1938)
- The Muzzle (1938)
- Le joueur (1938)
- Opera Ball (1939)
- Maria Ilona (1939)
- Morgen werde ich verhaftet (1939)
- Roses in Tyrol (1940)
- Clothes Make the Man (1940)
- The Swedish Nightingale (1941)
- Andreas Schlüter (1942)
- A Man with Principles? (1943)
- Love Premiere (1943)
- Wenn die Sonne wieder scheint (1943)
- Melusine (1944)
- Der Fall Molander (1945)
- Die Fledermaus (1946)
- Between Yesterday and Tomorrow (1947)
- Film Without a Title (1948)
- Verspieltes Leben (1949)
- Einmaleins der Ehe (1949)
- The Legend of Faust (1949)
- Love on Ice (1950)
- Kein Engel ist so rein (1950)
- Two Times Lotte (1950)
- Beloved Liar (1950)
- Dr. Holl (1951)
- Der Teufel führt Regie (1951)
- The Sergeant's Daughter (1952)
- The White Horse Inn (1952)
- No Greater Love (1952)
- Alraune (1952)
- Behind Monastery Walls (1952)
- The Forester's Daughter (1952)
- The Divorcée (1953)
- The Village Under the Sky (1953)
- Music by Night (1953)
- The Chaplain of San Lorenzo (1953)
- The Last Summer (1954)
- Sauerbruch - Das war mein Leben (1954)
- Wedding Bells (1954)
- The Flying Classroom (1954)
- The Last Man (1955)
- Hanussen (1955)
- Beloved Enemy (1955)
- As Long as There Are Pretty Girls (1955)
- The Trapp Family (1956)
- Regine (1956)
- My Husband's Getting Married Today (1956)
- Magic Fire (1956)
- Heiße Ernte (1956)
- Devil in Silk (1956)
- The Last Ones Shall Be First (1957)
- And Lead Us Not Into Temptation (1957)
- Confessions of Felix Krull (1957)
- Resurrection (1958)
- The Trapp Family in America (1958)
- The Spessart Inn (1958)
- Taiga (1958)
- Dorothea Angermann (1959)
- The Beautiful Adventure (1959)
- The Buddenbrooks (1959)
- A Woman for Life (1960)
- You Don't Shoot at Angels (1960)
- Gustav Adolf's Page (1960)

== Bibliography ==
- Reimer, Robert C. & Reimer, Carol J. The A to Z of German Cinema. Scarecrow Press, 2010.
