= Refugees (1933 film) =

1933 film

- German film poster
- German: Flüchtlinge
- Directed by: Gustav Ucicky
- Written by: Gerhard Menzel
- Produced by: Günther Stapenhorst
- Starring: Hans Albers; Käthe von Nagy; Eugen Klöpfer
- Cinematography: Fritz Arno Wagner
- Edited by: Eduard von Borsody
- Music by: Ernst Erich Buder; Herbert Windt
- Production company: UFA
- Distributed by: UFA
- Release date: 14 October 1933
- Running time: 87 minutes
- Country: Germany
- Language: German

Refugees (German: Flüchtlinge) is a 1933 German drama film directed by Gustav Ucicky and starring Hans Albers, Käthe von Nagy, and Eugen Klöpfer. It depicts Volga German refugees persecuted by the Bolsheviks on the Sino-Russian border in Manchuria in 1928.

The screenplay was written by Gerhard Menzel and was based on his own novel of the same title. It was shot at the Babelsberg Studios with sets designed by the art directors Robert Herlth and Walter Röhrig. A separate French-language version At the End of the World was also produced, with Käthe von Nagy appearing alongside a different cast.

It was the first movie to be awarded an NS-Staatspreis prize, and Goebbels praised it as among those films that, while they did not explicitly cite National Socialist principles, nevertheless embodied its spirit, a new film reflecting the ideal of their national revolution.

The refugees are rescued by a heroic German leader much like the Führer; the symbolism is obviously intended to emulate Adolf Hitler. He is disgusted by "November Germany", and devotes himself to the ideal of "true Germany". He off-handedly disposes of some refugees as worthless, and demands complete obedience from all others. The death of a boy deeply devoted to him moves him, as dying for a cause is something he would wish for himself, in keeping with Nazi glorification of heroic death.

Their Communist persecutors are portrayed simply as brutal murderers, typical of works prior to the Molotov–Ribbentrop Pact (and again after its breach). The film was shown for some time after the pact, owing to bureaucratic oversight, complicating the efforts of Nazi propaganda.

The movie is mostly set in the city of Harbin, in what was at the time the Republic of China.

== Cast ==
- Hans Albers as Arneth
- Käthe von Nagy as Kristja Laudy
- Eugen Klöpfer as Bernhard Laudy
- Andrews Engelmann as The Commissar
- Fritz Genschow as Hermann, refugee-engineer
- Karl Rainer as Peter, teenage refugee
- Franziska Kinz as pregnant woman
- Ida Wüst as Frau Megele
- Veit Harlan as Mannlinger
- Karl Meixner as Pappel
- Hans Adalbert Schlettow as Siberian
- Friedrich Gnaß as Hussar
- Hans Hermann Schaufuss as Zweig
- Josef Dahmen as man with red hair
- Carsta Löck as Frau Hellerle

== Production ==
Gerhard Menzel wrote a screenplay based on his own novel after writing the screenplay for Morgenrot. The film was directed by Gustav Ucicky. The cinematography was done by Fritz Arno Wagner and the soundtrack was composed by Herbert Windt and Ernst Erich Buder.

== Release ==
The film was approved by the censors on 1 December 1933, and premiered on 3 December. It premiered in the United States at the 79th Street Theater in New York.

== Works cited ==
- Waldman, Harry (2008). Nazi Films In America, 1933-1942. McFarland & Company. ISBN 9780786438617.
- Welch, David (1983). Propaganda and the German Cinema: 1933-1945. I.B. Tauris. ISBN 9781860645204.

== Bibliography ==
- Giesen, Rolf. Nazi Propaganda Films: A History and Filmography. McFarland, 2003.
