= The Black Hussar (1932 film) =

1932 film

- Cover of the film's Illustrierter Film-Kurier number
- German: Der schwarze Husar
- Directed by: Gerhard Lamprecht
- Written by: Curt J. Braun; Leo Lenz; Philipp Lothar Mayring
- Produced by: Bruno Duday
- Starring: Conrad Veidt; Mady Christians; Wolf Albach-Retty
- Cinematography: Franz Planer
- Music by: Eduard Künneke
- Production company: UFA
- Distributed by: UFA
- Release date: 12 October 1932
- Running time: 94 minutes
- Country: Germany
- Language: German

The Black Hussar (German: Der schwarze Husar) is a 1932 German historical drama film directed by Gerhard Lamprecht and starring Bernhard Goetzke, Conrad Veidt, Mady Christians, and Wolf Albach-Retty. It premièred at the Ufa-Palast am Zoo on 12 October 1932, part of a whole string of 'patriotic' movies released in the late days of the Weimar Republic.

The film's sets were designed by the art directors Robert Herlth and Walter Röhrig. It was shot at the Babelsberg Studios and on location around Schwedt in Brandenburg.

== Plot ==
In 1812, during the French period, large parts of Germany are occupied by Napoleon's troops. Several paramilitary Freikorps units battle the French forces, among them the Black Brunswickers led by the 'Black Duke' Frederick William of Brunswick-Wolfenbüttel. After the War of the Fifth Coalition, the Black Hussars are pursued by Napoleon throughout the country, but frequently take refuge with noble-minded Germans.

While the Duke has taken a passage to the Isle of Wight, his cavalry officer (Rittmeister) Hansgeorg von Hochberg and his friend Lieutenant Aribert von Blome hide away in an inn with two young women. They hear of the plans by the French governor Darmont to abduct Duke Frederick William's bride, Princess Marie of Baden, to marry her to the Polish prince Potovski. They set about trying to foil the plans.

== Main cast ==
- Conrad Veidt as Rittmeister Hansgeorg von Hochberg
- Mady Christians as Marie Luise
- Wolf Albach-Retty as Leutnant Aribert von Blome
- Ursula Grabley as Brigitte
- Otto Wallburg as Governor Darmont
- Bernhard Goetzke as Duke Friedrich Wilhelm von Braunschweig
- Günther Hadank as Captain Fachon, adjutant
- Gregori Chmara as Prince Potovski
- Fritz Greiner as Corporal
- Hubert von Meyerinck as Koch Darmonts
