= Ronny (1931 film) =

1931 film

- Directed by: Reinhold Schünzel
- Written by: Emeric Pressburger; Reinhold Schünzel
- Produced by: Günther Stapenhorst
- Starring: Käthe von Nagy; Willy Fritsch; Hans Wassmann
- Cinematography: Robert Baberske; Fritz Arno Wagner
- Edited by: Ernst Fellner
- Music by: Franz Grothe
- Production company: UFA
- Distributed by: UFA
- Release date: 22 December 1931
- Running time: 89 minutes
- Country: Germany
- Language: German

Ronny is a 1931 German musical comedy film directed by Reinhold Schünzel and starring Käthe von Nagy, Willy Fritsch, and Hans Wassmann. A separate French-language version Ronny was also released. It was shot at the Babelsberg Studios in Berlin and premiered at the city's Gloria-Palast. The film's art direction was by Werner Schlichting and Benno von Arent.

== Cast ==
- Käthe von Nagy as Ronny
- Willy Fritsch as Prince of Perusa
- Hans Wassmann as Hofmarschall
- Otto Wallburg as Intendant des Hoftheaters
- Aribert Wäscher as Staatsminister
- Kurt Vespermann as Bahnhofsvorsteher Bomboni
- Willi Grill as Anton
- Wolfgang von Schwindt as Kriegsminister
- Olly Gebauer as Lisa
- William Huch as Kammerdiener
- Wilhelm Diegelmann
- Karl Elzer
- Theo Lingen
- Gertrud Wolle

== Bibliography ==
- Bock, Hans-Michael; Bergfelder, Tim, eds. (2009). The Concise Cinegraph: Encyclopaedia of German Cinema. New York: Berghahn Books. ISBN 978-1-57181-655-9.
