= The Little Escapade =

1931 film

- Directed by: Reinhold Schünzel
- Written by: Emeric Pressburger; Reinhold Schünzel
- Produced by: Günther Stapenhorst
- Starring: Renate Müller; Hermann Thimig; Hans Brausewetter
- Cinematography: Werner Brandes
- Music by: Ralph Erwin
- Production company: UFA
- Distributed by: UFA
- Release date: 14 August 1931
- Running time: 88 minutes
- Country: Germany
- Language: German

The Little Escapade (German: Der kleine Seitensprung) is a 1931 German comedy film directed by Reinhold Schünzel and starring Renate Müller, Hermann Thimig and Hans Brausewetter. It was shot at the Babelsberg Studios in Berlin and premiered at the city's Gloria-Palast. The film's sets were designed by the art directors Robert Herlth, Walter Röhrig and Werner Schlichting. A separate French-language version was also made.

== Synopsis ==
A woman pretends that she is having an affair as a joke on her husband, but as he decides to start divorce proceedings she realises she has taken the joke too far.

== Cast ==
- Renate Müller as Erika Heller
- Hermann Thimig as Walter Heller
- Hans Brausewetter as Dr. Max Eppmann, Transportleiter
- Otto Wallburg as August Wernecke, Fabrikant
- Hilde Hildebrand as Lona Wernecke, seine Frau
- Diana as Wahrsagerin
- Hermann Blaß as Klavierspieler
- Oscar Sabo as Lohndiener
- Martha Ziegler as Zofe
- Paul Westermeier as Tänzer in der Bar
- Otti Dietze
- Olga Engl
- Berta Gast
- Ruth Jacobsen
- Hildegard Kohnert
- Michael von Newlinsky
- Gertrud Wolle
- Louise Lagrange

== Bibliography ==
- Salwolke, Scott (1997). The Films of Michael Powell and the Archers. Scarecrow Press. ISBN 978-0-8108-3183-4.
