= The Royal Waltz (1935 film) =

1935 German musical film by Herbert Maisch

- Directed by: Herbert Maisch
- Written by: Emil Burri; Walter Forster
- Produced by: Karl Ritter
- Starring: Paul Hörbiger; Curd Jürgens; Carola Höhn
- Cinematography: Konstantin Irmen-Tschet
- Edited by: Eduard von Borsody
- Music by: Franz Doelle
- Production company: UFA
- Distributed by: UFA
- Release date: 23 September 1935
- Running time: 83 minutes
- Country: Germany
- Language: German

The Royal Waltz (German: Königswalzer) is a 1935 German musical film directed by Herbert Maisch and starring Paul Hörbiger, Curd Jürgens, and Carola Höhn. It was shot at the Babelsberg Studios of UFA in Berlin. The film's sets were designed by the art directors Robert Herlth and Walter Röhrig. A separate French-language version Royal Waltz was also released. It was remade in 1955 under the same title.

== Synopsis ==
In 1852 an Austrian count is sent to Munich to arrange the marriage between his master Emperor Franz Joseph and the Princess Elisabeth, the daughter of the King of Bavaria.

== Cast ==
- Paul Hörbiger as König Max II. von Bayern
- Curd Jürgens as Kaiser Franz Joseph von Österreich
- Carola Höhn as Herzogin Elisabeth in Bayern, genannt Sisi
- Anton Pointner as Graf Tettenbach, österr. Gesandter in München
- Willi Forst as Graf Ferdinand von Tettenbach, his nephew
- Kurt von Ruffin as Graf Otto Preysing
- Hans Leibelt as Minister Doenniges
- Theodor Danegger as Ludwig Tomasoni, Cafetier
- Heli Finkenzeller as Theres Tomasoni, her daughter
- Ellen Schwanneke as Anni Tomasoni, her sister
- Hugo Schrader as Franz, Konditor bei Tomasoni
- Oskar Sima as Landtagsabgeordneter Pfandl
- Carl Wery as Brandmeyer
- Werner Stock as Ein Student
- Karl Hammes as Singer, Don Juan

== Bibliography ==
- Klaus, Ulrich J. Deutsche Tonfilme: Jahrgang 1931. Klaus-Archiv, 2006.
- Reimer, Robert C. & Reimer, Carol J. Historical Dictionary of German Cinema. Rowman & Littlefield, 2019.
- Von Dassanowsky, Robert. Screening Transcendence: Film Under Austrofascism and the Hollywood Hope, 1933-1938. Indiana University Press, 2018
- Waldman, Harry. Nazi Films in America, 1933-1942. McFarland, 2008.
