= Ave Maria (1936 film) =

1936 film

- Directed by: Johannes Riemann
- Screenplay by: Georg C. Klaren; Bruno Mondi
- Story by: Georg C. Klaren
- Produced by: Alberto Giacalone; Martin Pichert
- Starring: Beniamino Gigli; Käthe von Nagy; Harald Paulsen; Paul Henckels; Erna Berger
- Cinematography: Bruno Mondi
- Edited by: Roger von Norman
- Music by: Alois Melichar
- Production company: Itala-Film
- Distributed by: Neue Deutsch Lichtspiel-Syndikat
- Release dates: 21 August 1936 (Germany); 1 October 1936 (United States)
- Running time: 88 minutes
- Country: Germany
- Language: German

Ave Maria is a 1936 German musical drama film. It stars Italian opera tenor Beniamino Gigli and German actress Käthe von Nagy.

== Plot ==
Tino Dossi (Beniamino Gigli), a wealthy, famous, and older opera singer, is grieving over the terrible loss of his wife, a devoted French woman. Each year, he travels to Paris to visit her grave, but this year he is forced to go a concert his manager has arranged. While enjoying the concert, his manager visits a seedy night club and, while drunk, tells a cabaret entertainer, and her lover, that the singer is very unhappy and also wealthy.

The scheming night club girl known as Chansonnière Claudette (Käthe von Nagy) meets the singer and accompanies him to Naples, pretending to be upset about his wife's demise. The singer and the girl are later engaged, but he discovers her lies and she, now genuinely in love with him, drives away in a car, but is badly injured in a car crash. The singer, now aware of her repentance and true affection for him, takes her for his bride.
