= At the End of the World (1934 film) =

1934 film

- Directed by: Henri Chomette; Gustav Ucicky
- Written by: Henri Chomette
- Based on: Refugees by Gerhard Menzel
- Produced by: Raoul Ploquin; Günther Stapenhorst
- Starring: Pierre Blanchar; Käthe von Nagy; Charles Vanel
- Cinematography: Fritz Arno Wagner
- Edited by: Eduard von Borsody
- Music by: Ernst Erich Buder; Herbert Windt
- Production companies: UFA; L'Alliance Cinématographique Européenne
- Distributed by: L'Alliance Cinématographique Européenne
- Release date: 30 March 1934
- Running time: 80 minutes
- Countries: France; Germany
- Language: French

At the End of the World (French: Au bout du monde) is a 1934 French-German drama film directed by Henri Chomette and Gustav Ucicky and starring Pierre Blanchar, Käthe von Nagy and Charles Vanel. It was made at the Babelsberg Studios of UFA outside Berlin, as the French-language version of the film Refugees (1933). It was co-produced and distributed by L'Alliance Cinématographique Européenne, the French subsidiary of UFA. Käthe von Nagy appeared in both versions, but her male co-start and supporting casts were different.

== Synopsis ==
French political refugees trying to flee the Soviet Union end up in war-torn Manchuria in Northern China. They try desperately try to make their escape by railway.

== Cast ==
- Pierre Blanchar as Jean Arnaud
- Käthe von Nagy as Christine Laudy
- Charles Vanel as Geroges Laudy
- Line Noro as Line
- Raymond Cordy as Dédé
- Pierre-Louis as Pierre
- Mady Berry as Marie-Jeanne
- René Bergeron as Malinger
- Raymond Aimos as Le hussard
- Fritz Genschow as Le sibérien
- Andrews Engelmann as Le commissaire russe
- Pierre Piérade as Peuplier
- Hans Adalbert Schlettow as Le Bucheron
- Vera Baranovskaya

== Bibliography ==
- Garncarz, Joseph . Film Europa Babylon. Richard Boorberg Verlag, 2005.
- Romani, Cinzia . Tainted Goddesses. Da Capo Press, 1992
