= Cinema and the Swastika =

2007 book edited by Roel Vande Winkel and David Welch

Cinema and the Swastika: The International Expansion of Third Reich Cinema
- Editor: Roel Vande Winkel; David Welch
- Language: English
- Genre: Non-fiction
- Publisher: Palgrave Macmillan
- Publication date: 2007

Cinema and the Swastika: The International Expansion of Third Reich Cinema is a 2007 book published by Palgrave Macmillan and edited by Roel Vande Winkel and David Welch.
