= Man Without a Name (1932 film) =

1932 film

- German film poster
- German: Mensch ohne Namen
- Directed by: Gustav Ucicky
- Written by: Robert Liebmann
- Based on: Honoré de Balzac
- Starring: Werner Krauss; Helene Thimig; Mathias Wieman; Hertha Thiele
- Cinematography: Carl Hoffmann
- Music by: Hans-Otto Borgmann; Allan Gray
- Production company: UFA
- Distributed by: UFA
- Release date: 1 July 1932
- Running time: 87 minutes
- Country: Germany
- Language: German

Man Without a Name (German: Mensch ohne Namen) is a 1932 German drama film directed by Gustav Ucicky and starring Werner Krauss, Helene Thimig and Mathias Wieman. It was shot at the Babelsberg Studios in Berlin. The film's sets were designed by the art directors Robert Herlth and Walter Röhrig. It was produced and distributed by UFA and premiered on 1 July 1932. It is inspired by the 1832 novel Colonel Chabert by Honoré de Balzac, updated to the modern era with the setting shifted from Restoration France to Weimar Germany. A separate French-language version Un homme sans nom was also produced.

== Synopsis ==
In the Soviet Union in 1932, a man works as a manager at a vehicle factory. However a visit from a foreign delegation triggers his memory. He is really a former German soldier who suffered memory loss after being wounded on the Eastern Front during the First World War. After sixteen year's absence he returns to Berlin but discovers that his wife had him declared dead in 1921 and that the manufacturing company he owned is controlled by another man. With no legal existence in the eyes of the authorities, and shunned by those who don't recognise him, as a "man without a name", he contemplates suicide.

After meeting Grete, a vibrant young woman, he begins to adjust to the new situation. Rediscovering his old talents he invents a potentially lucrative new process and applies for patent. Accepting that he can never recover his old life or name, he registers the patent in an entirely new one.

== Cast ==
- Werner Krauss as Heinrich Martin
- Helene Thimig as Eva-Maria Sander
- Mathias Wieman as Dr. Alfred Sander
- Hertha Thiele as Helene Martin
- Julius Falkenstein as Julius Hanke
- Fritz Grünbaum as Erwin Gablinky
- Eduard von Winterstein as Amtsrichter
- Max Gülstorff as Amtsgerichtspresident
- Maria Bard as Grete Schulze
- Hans Brausewetter as Referendar Müller
- Carl Balhaus
- Alfred Beierle
- Ernst Behmer
- Gerhard Bienert
- Gregori Chmara
- Artur Menzel
- Hermann Picha
- Heinrich Schroth
