= Eduard von Borsody =

Austrian filmmaker

- Born: 13 June 1898; Vienna, Austria-Hungary
- Died: 1 January 1970 (aged 71); Vienna, Austria
- Occupations: Cameraman, film editor, film director
- Years active: 1935–1963

Eduard von Borsody (German: [ˈboʁʒodi]; 13 June 1898 – 1 January 1970) was an Austrian cameraman, film editor, film director, and screenplay writer.

== Biography ==
His film career began as a cameraman. Among his first jobs were three films on which Mihály Kertész (later Michael Curtiz) carried out the production design for the Vienna-based Sascha-Film: an Arthur Schnitzler adaptation Young Medardus (1923), the romance Fiaker Nr. 13 and the artist's life Der goldene Schmetterling (both 1926). Later he worked with such different directors as Carl Wilhelm, Ernő Metzner, Gustav Ucicky and Max Nosseck.

After the switch to sound film he was engaged by the German industry leader Universum Film AG (Ufa) as a film editor (cutter). Eduard von Borsody thereafter often worked under Ucicky's direction and edited for him, among many other films, the National Socialist propaganda films Morgenrot and Refugees. In 1937, after some experience as assistant director, also with Ucicky, and a series of short dramas, he directed his first film for Ufa: Diamonds. Rubber (1938), with René Deltgen and Gustav Diessl, was an adventure film about the real-life English explorer, Henry Wickham, who in 1876 smuggled rubber seeds to England in order to break Brazil's rubber monopoly. Sensationsprozeß Casilla (1939) was about a child abduction. With Congo Express (also in 1939) Borsody again shot an adventure film in a tropical setting in an attempt to capitalise on the success of Rubber. Willy Birgel, Marianne Hoppe and René Deltgen starred.

Once World War II began, light cheerful escapist films were much in demand, and von Borsody was cinematographer for the romantic musical drama Wunschkonzert ("Request Concert"), one of the most successful films of the entire Nazi period. Ilse Werner plays a young Berliner, who patiently and trustingly awaits the return of the man to whom she is engaged, played by Carl Raddatz, ordered on a secret mission to Spain. The film was classified as "politically valuable", "artistically valuable", "valuable for the people". and "valuable for youth", and took 7.6 million Reichsmarks.

The science fiction film Weltraumschiff 18 (i.e. Spaceship 18), which he directed and had already begun filming had to be abandoned because of the outbreak of the war. Material was used in the short science-fiction movie, Weltraumschiff 1 startet (Spaceship 1 takes off). The last film Borsody shot before the end of the war, the Gottfried Keller adaptation Jugendliebe fell afoul of the film censors and did not open until 1947. After the end of the war Borsody had no trouble continuing his film career despite his previous involvement in propaganda films. After a number of Heimatfilme came his best-known post-war film, the romantic comedy of 1956 Dany, bitte schreiben Sie ("Dany, Please Write!"), with Sonja Ziemann and Rudolf Prack, and the smuggling film Liane, das Mädchen aus dem Urwald, with which he returned to the exotic. His next film, Skandal um Dodo (1958), was one of the first post-war films in German to star a black woman.

His 1965 film Bergwind was entered into the 4th Moscow International Film Festival.

== Family ==
Von Borsody was the father of actor Hans von Borsody. He was the younger brother of set designer Julius von Borsody. His granddaughter, Suzanne von Borsody, is a German actress.

== Filmography ==
=== Silent films ===
as cameraman if not indicated otherwise:

- Young Medardus (dir. Michael Curtiz, 1923) – camera (with Gustav Ucicky)
- Nameless (dir. Michael Curtiz, 1923) – camera (with Gustav Ucicky)
- Die vertauschte Braut (dir. Carl Wilhelm, 1925)
- Love Story (1925)
- Der Bastard (1925)
- Die Mühle von Sanssouci (1926) - camera assistant
- Fiaker Nr. 13 (1926) – camera (with Gustav Ucicky)
- Dürfen wir schweigen? (1926)
- The Third Squadron (dir. Carl Wilhelm, 1926) - camera (with Gustav Ucicky)
- Der goldene Schmetterling (1926) – camera (with Gustav Ucicky)
- Die Pratermizzi (dir. Gustav Ucicky, Karl Leiter, 1927)
- Tingel Tangel (dir. Gustav Ucicky, 1927)
- Höhere Töchter (1927)
- Polizeibericht Überfall (1928)
- It Attracted Three Fellows (dir. Carl Wilhelm, 1928)
- The Case of Prosecutor M (1928)
- Die Dame auf der Banknote (1929)
- The Call of the North (1929)
- The Missing Wife (1929)
- Liebeskleeblatt (1930)
- Die Jugendgeliebte/Goethe's Jugendgeliebte (1930)
- Rivals for the World Record (1930)
- Dance Into Happiness (1930)

=== Sound films to 1945 ===
- Yorck (dir. Gustav Ucicky, 1931) - assistant director, editor
- Two Hearts Beat as One (dir. Wilhelm Thiele, 1932)
- The Beautiful Adventure (dir. Reinhold Schünzel, 1932) - editor
  - The Beautiful Adventure (dir. Reinhold Schünzel, Roger Le Bon, 1932) - editor
- Morgenrot (dir. Gustav Ucicky, 1933) - editor
- Season in Cairo (dir. Reinhold Schünzel, 1933)
- Refugees (dir. Gustav Ucicky, 1933) - assistant director, editor
- The Young Baron Neuhaus (dir. Gustav Ucicky, 1934) - editor
  - Night in May (dir. Gustav Ucicky, Henri Chomette, Raoul Ploquin, 1934)
- Fresh Wind from Canada (dir. Erich Holder, 1935) - editor
- Joan of Arc (dir. Gustav Ucicky, 1935) - assistant director, editor
- Schnitzel fliegt (1935; drama short film) - director, screenplay
- The Last Four on Santa Cruz (dir. Werner Klingler, 1936) - editor
- Savoy Hotel 217 (dir. Gustav Ucicky, 1936) - editor
- Was ein Häkchen werden will (1936; drama short film) - director
- Stradivaris Schülergeige (1936; drama short film) - director
- Rosen und Liebe (1936; drama short film) - director
- Patentkunstschloss (1936; drama short film) - director
- In 40 Minuten (1936; drama short film) - director
- Die Hochzeitsreise (1936; drama short film) - director
- Früh übt sich (1936; drama short film) - director
- Du bist so schön, Berlinerin (1936; drama short film) - director
- The Man Who Was Sherlock Holmes (dir. Karl Hartl, 1937) - assistant director
- Jürgens riecht Lunte (1937; drama short film) - director, screenplay
- Diamonds (1937) - director
- Die Bombenidee (1937; drama short film) - director
- Rubber (1938) - director, screenplay
- The Sensational Casilla Trial (1939) - director
- Congo Express (1939) - director, screenplay
- Wunschkonzert (1940) - director, screenplay
- Whom the Gods Love (dir. Karl Hartl, 1942) - screenplay

=== Post-war films ===
- Jugendliebe/Übers Jahr, wenn die Kornblumen blühen (1944/47) - director
- Die Frau am Weg (Austria 1948, with Brigitte Horney) - director, screenplay
- Arlberg Express (Austria 1948, with Paul Hubschmid and Elfe Gerhart) - director
- White Gold (Austria 1949, with Angela Salloker) - director, screenplay
- Wedding with Erika (West Germany 1950, with Marianne Schönauer and Wolfgang Lukschy) - director, screenplay
- Die Kreuzlschreiber (1950) - director, screenplay
- The Fourth Commandment (Austria 1950, with Attila Hörbiger) - director, screenplay
- Sensation in Savoy (West Germany 1950, with Sybille Schmitz and Harald Paulsen) - director
- One Night's Intoxication (West Germany 1951, with Christl Mardayn) - director
- Vanished Melody (Austria 1952, with Elfie Mayerhofer) - director, screenplay
- Ich hab' mich so an Dich gewöhnt/Geschiedenes Fräulein (Austria 1952, with Inge Egger and O. W. Fischer) - director, screenplay
- The Landlady of Maria Wörth (Austria 1952, with Isa and Jutta Günther) - director, screenplay
- Ich und meine Frau (Austria 1953, with Attila Hörbiger) - director, screenplay
- If I Only Have Your Love (Austria 1953) - director
- Maxie (Austria 1954, with Cornell Borchers) - director, screenplay
- The Major and the Bulls (West Germany 1955, with Attila Hörbiger and Christiane Hörbiger) - director
- Geliebte Corinna (West Germany 1956, with Elisabeth Müller and Hans Söhnker) - director
- Dany, bitte schreiben Sie (West Germany 1956) - director, screenplay
- Liane, Jungle Goddess (West Germany 1956, with Marion Michael and Hardy Krüger) - director
- Skandal um Dodo (Austria 1958, with Olive Moorefield and Karin Dor) - director
- Der Schäfer vom Trutzberg (West Germany 1959, with Heidi Brühl and Hans von Borsody) - director
- Traumrevue (Austria 1959, with Waltraut Haas and Eva Pawlik) - director
- When the Bells Sound Clearly (Austria 1959, with Willy Birgel) - director, screenplay
- Romance in Venice (Austria 1962, with Willy Birgel and Ann Smyrner) - director, screenplay
- Bergwind (Austria 1963, with Alwy Becker and Hans von Borsody) - director, screenplay

== Sources ==
- (in German) CineGraph. Lexikon zum deutschsprachigen Film
