= Looping the Loop =

1928 film directed by Arthur Robison

- Directed by: Arthur Robison
- Written by: Robert Liebmann; Robert Reinert; Arthur Robison
- Produced by: Gregor Rabinovitch
- Starring: Werner Krauss; Jenny Jugo; Warwick Ward; Gina Manès
- Cinematography: Carl Hoffmann
- Music by: Artur Guttmann; Hugo Riesenfeld
- Production company: UFA
- Distributed by: Parufamet (Germany); Paramount Pictures (US)
- Release date: 15 September 1928
- Running time: 133 minutes
- Country: Germany
- Languages: Silent Version; German Intertitles; Sound Version (Synchronized); English Intertitles

Looping the Loop (German: Die Todesschleife) is a 1928 German silent thriller film directed by Arthur Robison and starring Werner Krauss, Jenny Jugo and Warwick Ward. The film was produced by UFA. It was shot at the Babelsberg Studios in Berlin and on location in London. The film's sets were designed by the art directors Robert Herlth and Walter Röhrig. As with UFA's Variety, Paramount Pictures handled the film's American distribution as part of the Parufamet agreement. Paramount prepared a sound version for distribution in English speaking countries. While the sound version has no audible dialog, it featured a synchronized musical score with sound effects using both the sound-on-disc and sound-on-film process.

== Cast ==
- Werner Krauss as Botto, a famous clown
- Jenny Jugo as Blanche Valette
- Warwick Ward as Andre Melton, artist
- Gina Manès as Hanna, a trick shooter
- Sig Arno as Sigi, Hanna's partner
- Max Gülstorff as Blanche's male relative
- Lydia Potechina as Blanche's female relative
- Gyula Szőreghy as an agent
- Harry Grunwald

== Music ==
The sound version prepared by Paramount featured a theme song entitled “Poor Punchinello” by Sam Lewis and Joe Young (words) and Lew Pollack (music).

== See also ==
- List of early sound feature films (1926–1929)

== Bibliography ==
- Bergfelder, Tim & Bock, Hans-Michael. The Concise Cinegraph: Encyclopedia of German. Berghahn Books, 2009.
- St. Pierre, Paul Matthew. E.A. Dupont and his Contribution to British Film: Varieté, Moulin Rouge, Piccadilly, Atlantic, Two Worlds, Cape Forlorn. Fairleigh Dickinson University Press, 2010.
