= Hans von Borsody =

German actor (1929–2013)

Hans von Borsody (German: [ˈboʁʒodi]; 20 September 1929 – 4 November 2013) was an Austrian-German film actor.

== Biography ==
He was born in Vienna into an artistic family of Hungarian descent. His father Eduard was a film director, his mother Maria was a violinist and his uncle Julius a set designer. His daughter Suzanne is an actress. When Borsody was three, his family moved to Berlin and obtained German citizenship.

He was married to Karin Dittmann, Rosemarie Fendel, Alwy Becker and Heide Keller.

Von Borsody died in Kiel, aged 84.

== Filmography ==
Year	Title	Role	Notes
1955	Don Juan	Masetto	
1955	Royal Hunt in Ischl	Eberhard von Preußen	
1955	The Major and the Bulls	George	
1956	Der Meineidbauer (The Perjurer)	Franz Ferner	
1956	Der Schandfleck	Florian, ihr Sohn	
1956	Imperial and Royal Field Marshal	Leutnant Rudi Müller	
1957	Jägerblut	Benno Schaidler	
1958	The Green Devils of Monte Cassino		
1958	Bimbo the Great	Bert Williams	
1958	When She Starts, Look Out		
1958	Polikuschka	Baron von Rossowski	
1959	Nick Knatterton's Adventure	Eddie	
1959	The Shepherd from Trutzberg	Lienhard	
1959	Besuch aus heiterem Himmel	Peter Mannhart	
1959	Mein Schatz, komm mit ans blaue Meer	Martin Exel	
1960	Juanito	Tom	
1960	The True Jacob	Fred	
1960	The Mystery of the Green Spider	Peter Thorsten	
1960	Schlagerraketen – Festival der Herzen	Marcel	
1961	Il conquistatore di Maracaibo	Alan Drake / Albert von Eyck	
1961	… und du mein Schatz bleibst hier	Peter Baumann	
1961	Barbara	Andreas	
1961	Im schwarzen Rößl	Dr. Martin Behrend	
1962	Candidate for Murder	Kersten	Edgar Wallace Mysteries
1962	Wild Water	Thomas Mautner	
1962	Commando	Fritz	
1963	Bergwind	Dr. Alexander Rell	
1963	The Invisible Terror	Walter Vogel	
1964	The Cavern	Oberlt. Hans Beck	
1964	Golden Goddess of Rio Beni	Jeff	
1965	Trunk to Cairo	Hans Klugg	
1965	Buffalo Bill, Hero of the Far West	Captain Hunter	
1966	Robin Hood, der edle Räuber	Robin Hood	TV film
1966	Cliff Dexter	Cliff Dexter	TV series
1966	Date for a Murder	Walter Dempsey	
1966–1967	Die Nibelungen	Volker von Alzey	Released in two parts
1967	Massacre in the Black Forest	Arminius	
1968	Andrea the Nympho	Frederick	
1969	Pudelnackt in Oberbayern	Martin Oberhauser, Wirt	
1969	Agáchate, que disparan	Max	
1970	Formula 1 - Nell'inferno del Grand Prix	Claude Pellissier	
1975	Das Rückendekolleté		
1977	Schulmädchen-Report 11.	Leiter der Gesprächsrunde	Uncredited
1977	A Bridge Too Far	General Günther Blumentritt	
1979	Goetz von Berlichingen of the Iron Hand		Uncredited
1979	Bloodline	Peasant Guard	
