= Island of the Dead (1921 film) =

1921 German drama film

- Directed by: Carl Froelich
- Written by: Walter Supper
- Produced by: Erich Pommer
- Starring: Lil Dagover; Bernhard Goetzke; Walter Janssen
- Cinematography: A.O. Weitzenberg
- Production company: Decla-Bioscop
- Distributed by: Decla-Bioscop
- Release date: 7 January 1921
- Country: Germany
- Languages: Silent; German intertitles

Island of the Dead (German: Toteninsel) is a 1921 German drama film directed by Carl Froelich and starring Lil Dagover, Bernhard Goetzke and Walter Janssen.

The film's sets were designed by the art directors Robert Herlth, Walter Röhrig and Hermann Warm.

== Cast ==
- Lil Dagover
- Bernhard Goetzke
- Walter Janssen
- Gertrud von Hoschek

== Bibliography ==
- Hardt, Ursula. From Caligari to California: Erich Pommer's life in the International Film Wars. Berghahn Books, 1996.
