= Waltz War =

1933 film

- Directed by: Ludwig Berger
- Written by: Robert Liebmann; Hans Müller
- Produced by: Günther Stapenhorst
- Starring: Renate Müller; Willy Fritsch; Paul Hörbiger
- Cinematography: Carl Hoffmann
- Edited by: Willy Zeyn
- Music by: Franz Grothe; Joseph Lanner
- Production company: UFA
- Distributed by: UFA
- Release date: 4 October 1933
- Running time: 93 minutes
- Country: Germany
- Language: German

Waltz War (German: Walzerkrieg) is a 1933 German musical comedy film directed by Ludwig Berger and starring Renate Müller, Willy Fritsch and Paul Hörbiger. It is loosely based on the rivalry between waltz composers Joseph Lanner and Johann Strauss I, as well as the life of the Austrian ballet dancer Katti Lanner (Joseph's daughter) who eventually settled in Victorian Britain. It is also known by the alternative title of The Battle of the Walzes.

The film was made by leading German studio UFA and shot at the company's Babelsberg Studios in Berlin with sets designed by Robert Herlth and Walter Röhrig. A separate French-language version Court Waltzes was also directed by Berger.

== Plot ==
In 1839 Joseph Lanner is a waltz composer and orchestral leader whose band plays in Vienna cafes. His first violinist, Johann Strauss, chafes under his leadership and composes his own waltzes. Lanner believes Strauss is plagiarizing from him, leading to open tension between them. Lanner's daughter, Katti, is in love with timpanist, Gustl, but Lanner disapproves. Two emissaries from the British royal court come to Vienna to study the waltz and bring the new style of music to London; one of them, Ilonka, is a former lover of Strauss's. At this time, Lanner is busy at the piano composing a new waltz, which he has Strauss write down on Strauss's monogrammed handkerchief. Lanner then begins conducting a performance, and insults Strauss, who storms off, and several of Lanner's orchestra members also leave. Katti and her harmonica-playing friend Susi fill in while Strauss forms his own ensemble; the two orchestras begin playing at the same time on adjacent pavilions, and the performance degenerates into a brawl. The British delegate is impressed with Strauss, and he wins the chance to go to London.

In London, the young Queen Victoria desires to marry Prince Albert of Saxe-Coburg and Gotha, but he is reluctant to propose. She invites him to her upcoming waltz ball, which features scandalously close couple-dancing, in hopes it will sway him to fall for her. Katti, who begrudges Strauss's triumph, forms her own women's orchestra and sails to London to try and redeem her father's reputation. Ilonka comes to Strauss in secret; while she is there, a butler summons him to teach the waltz to Victoria, and he sends Gustl, pretending to be Strauss, in his stead. Gustl teaches Victoria the waltz, albeit with mistakes and several faux pas; meanwhile, Katti's orchestra plays her father's waltzes from outside the window, and Katti is summoned to speak with Victoria. While Victoria is impressed with Katti, she is denied the chance to perform at the ball, as Strauss refuses to share the stage with a women's orchestra.

Strauss is then kidnapped by Katti's band (posing as a pack of rabid fans) shortly before he is to take the stage. Katti believes Victoria will have no choice but to let her band play, but Gustl again pretends to be Strauss, and his conducting is unexpectedly competent. The dance floor follows Victoria's odd waltz moves, and her plan to win Albert is successful. Gustl is asked to perform a spirited impromptu waltz in honor of the royal engagement, and he serendipitously discovers Lanner's composition, written on Strauss's handkerchief, as he wipes his brow. The composition is warmly received by the royal court, but not by Katti, who dumps Gustl for disrespecting her father's work. Towards the end of the performance, Strauss returns, hears Gustl playing Lanner's waltz, and decides he will take credit for it.

Lanner sues Strauss for copyright infringement, but the judges are split on whether the style of the waltz indicates composition by Lanner or Strauss. Katti and Susi trick Strauss into admitting the composition is Lanner's in front of witnesses, but Gustl points out to them that he, not Strauss, is the one who carried out the unauthorized performance, and so is the one most likely to face a conviction. At court, Strauss admits the composition is Lanner's, and accepts full blame for the infringement, shielding Gustl from punishment. The assembled crowd in the courtroom divides into factions for Lanner and Strauss, and then erupts into a hubbub when a jail term is announced. In order to placate the crowd, Strauss and Lanner begin composing a waltz together, burying their differences, and Katti and Gustl reunite.

== Cast ==
- Renate Müller as Katti Lanner
- Willy Fritsch as Pauker Gustl
- Paul Hörbiger as Joseph Lanner
- Anton Walbrook as Johann Strauss
- Rosy Barsony as Ilonka
- Theo Lingen as Sir Phillips
- Hanna Waag as Queen Victoria
- Trude Brionne as Katis Freundin Susi
- Karel Stepanek as Kellner Leopold
- Heinz von Cleve as Albert von Coburg
- Hugo Flink as Der Wirt
- Hansjörg Adolfi as Der Richter
- Ossy Kratz-Corell as 1st Piccolo
- Bert Schmidt-Moris as 2nd Piccolo
- Tommy Thomas as 3rd Piccolo

== Bibliography ==
- Bergfelder, Tim & Bock, Hans-Michael. The Concise Cinegraph: Encyclopedia of German. Berghahn Books, 2009.
- Elsaesser, Thomas. Weimar Cinema and After: Germany's Historical Imaginary. Routledge, 2000.
