= Pierre Piérade =

French actor (1884–1937

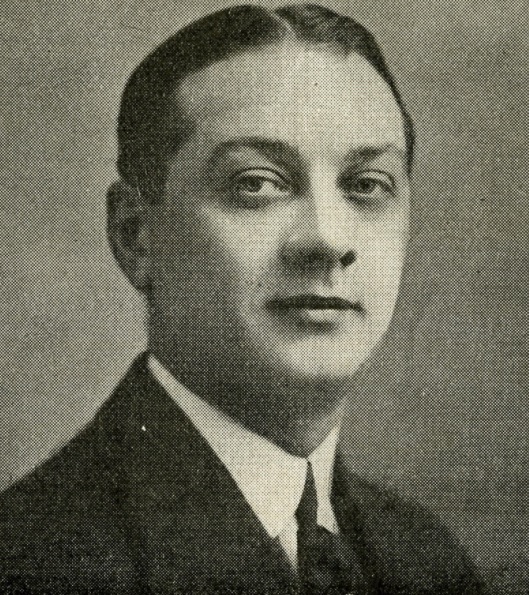
- Born: Pierre Émile Gaston Adelgeist; 14 November 1884; Paris, France
- Died: 1 August 1937 (aged 52); Paris, France
- Other name: Piérade
- Occupations: Actor, comedian, operetta singer
- Years active: 1921-1937 (film)

Pierre Piérade (born Pierre Émile Gaston Adelgeist; 14 November 1884 – 1 August 1937) was a French comedian, music hall performer, and stage and film actor.

== Selected filmography ==
- Little Lise (1930)
- American Love (1931)
- The Indictment (1931)
- To the Polls, Citizens (1932)
- Here's Berlin (1932)
- Narcotics (1932)
- F.P.1 (1933)
- Charlemagne (1933)
- Gold (1934)
- Rothchild (1934)
- Night in May (1934)
- A Man Has Been Stolen (1934)
- At the End of the World (1934)
- Dédé (1935)
- My Heart Is Calling You (1934)
- Baccara (1935)
- The Last Waltz (1936)
- Taras Bulba (1936)
- Jenny (1936)
- The Brighton Twins (1936)

== Bibliography ==
- Hardt, Ursula. From Caligari to California: Erich Pommer's life in the International Film Wars. Berghahn Books, 1996.
