= Yorck =

1931 film

- Directed by: Gustav Ucicky
- Written by: Robert Liebmann; Hans Müller; Arthur Pohl
- Produced by: Ernst Hugo Correll
- Starring: Werner Krauss; Gustaf Gründgens; Rudolf Forster
- Cinematography: Carl Hoffmann
- Edited by: Eduard von Borsody
- Music by: Werner Schmidt-Boelcke
- Production company: UFA
- Distributed by: UFA
- Release date: 23 December 1931
- Running time: 102 minutes
- Country: Germany
- Language: German

Yorck is a 1931 German war film directed by Gustav Ucicky and starring Werner Krauss, Grete Mosheim and Rudolf Forster. It portrays the life of the Prussian General Ludwig Yorck von Wartenburg, particularly his refusal to serve in Napoleon's army during the French Invasion of Russia in 1812. It was a Prussian film, one of a cycle of films made during the era that focused on Prussian history.

The film's sets were designed by the art director Robert Herlth and Walter Röhrig. It was shot at the Babelsberg Studios in Potsdam and on location around Berlin.

== Main cast ==
- Werner Krauss as General Yorck von Wartenberg
- Grete Mosheim as Barbara
- Rudolf Forster as King Friedrich Wilhelm III of Prussia
- Gustaf Gründgens as Karl August Fürst von Hardenberg
- Lothar Müthel as General von Clausewitz
- Friedrich Kayßler as General Kleist von Nollendorf
- Raoul Aslan as General McDonald
- Hans Rehmann as Lt. Rüdiger Heyking
- Walter Janssen as Vicomte Noailles
- Günther Hadank as Florian von Seydlitz
- Theodor Loos as Roeder
- Paul Otto as Natzmer
- Otto Wallburg as Field Marshal Count Diebitsch-Sabalkanskij
- Jakob Tiedtke as Krause

== Bibliography ==
- Noack, Frank (8 April 2016). Veit Harlan: The Life and Work of a Nazi Filmmaker. University Press of Kentucky. ISBN 978-0-8131-6701-5.
