= Ronny (1931 French-language film) =

1931 film

- Directed by: Reinhold Schünzel; Roger Le Bon
- Written by: Emeric Pressburger; Reinhold Schünzel
- Produced by: Günther Stapenhorst
- Starring: Käthe von Nagy; Marc Dantzer; Fernand Frey
- Cinematography: Robert Baberske; Fritz Arno Wagner
- Edited by: Ernst Fellner
- Music by: Franz Grothe
- Production company: UFA
- Distributed by: L'Alliance Cinématographique Européenne
- Release date: 1931
- Running time: 87 minutes
- Country: Germany
- Language: French

Ronny is a 1931 musical comedy film directed by Roger Le Bon and Reinhold Schünzel and starring Käthe von Nagy, Marc Dantzer and Fernand Frey. It was made by UFA as the French-language version of Ronny. Such multiple-language versions were common in the early years of sound.

== Cast ==
- Käthe von Nagy as Ronny
- Marc Dantzer as Rudolph, Prince of Perusa
- Fernand Frey as the Minister
- Lucien Baroux as Theater director
- Georges Deneubourg as Minister of Justice
- Gustave Huberdeau as Minister of State
- Charles Fallot as Finance Minister
- Monique Casty as Lisa
- Guy Sloux as Bomboni
- Lucien Callamand as Anton

== Bibliography ==
- Bock, Hans-Michael & Bergfelder, Tim. The Concise CineGraph. Encyclopedia of German Cinema. Berghahn Books, 2009.
