= Vienna, City of My Dreams (1928 film) =

1928 film

- Directed by: Victor Janson
- Written by: Jane Bess; Eddy Bussche
- Starring: Liane Haid; Luigi Serventi; Käthe von Nagy
- Cinematography: Giovanni Vitrotti; Mutz Greenbaum
- Music by: Hansheinrich Dransmann
- Production company: Greenbaum-Film
- Distributed by: Deutsche Universal-Film
- Release date: 7 August 1928
- Country: Germany
- Languages: Silent; German intertitles

Vienna, City of My Dreams (German: Wien, du Stadt meiner Träume or Die Königin seines Herzens) is a 1928 German silent film directed by Victor Janson and starring Liane Haid, Luigi Serventi and Käthe von Nagy.

The film's sets were designed by the art director Robert Neppach.

== Cast ==
- Liane Haid as Königin Viviane I.
- Luigi Serventi as Prinzgemahl
- Käthe von Nagy as Gräfin Mizzi Lichtenau
- Kurt Vespermann as Graf Wetterstein, Adjutant
- Adolphe Engers as Manager
- Ferdinand von Alten as Hofmarschall
- Ida Wüst as Hofdame
- Ernst Hofmann
- Antonie Jaeckel

== Bibliography ==
- Bock, Hans-Michael & Bergfelder, Tim. The Concise CineGraph. Encyclopedia of German Cinema. Berghahn Books, 2009.
