= Bergwind (film) =

1963 film

- Directed by: Eduard von Borsody
- Written by: Eduard von Borsody
- Produced by: Alfred Benesch
- Starring: Hans von Borsody
- Release date: December 1963
- Running time: 88 minutes
- Country: Austria
- Language: German

Bergwind (German: Sturm am Wilden Kaiser) is a 1963 Austrian drama film written and directed by Eduard von Borsody. It was entered in the 4th Moscow International Film Festival.

== Cast ==
- Hans von Borsody as Dr. Alexander Rell
- Alwy Becker as Patricia Theotokis
- Reinhard Kolldehoff as Mr. Wright
- Wolf Albach-Retty as Herr Meister
