= Savoy Hotel 217 =

- Directed by: Gustav Ucicky
- Written by: Gerhard Menzel
- Produced by: Fritz Podehl
- Starring: Hans Albers; Brigitte Horney; Alexander Engel
- Cinematography: Fritz Arno Wagner
- Edited by: Eduard von Borsody
- Music by: Walter Gronostay
- Production company: UFA
- Distributed by: UFA
- Release date: 7 April 1936
- Running time: 92 minutes
- Country: Germany
- Language: German

Savoy Hotel 217 (German: Savoy-Hotel 217) is a 1936 German mystery drama film directed by Gustav Ucicky and starring Hans Albers, Brigitte Horney and Alexander Engel. It was shot at the Babelsberg Studios in Potsdam. The film's sets were designed by the art directors Robert Herlth and Walter Röhrig. The costumes were by Herbert Ploberger. It premiered at Berlin's UFA-Palast am Zoo.

== Synopsis ==
In Tsarist Russia before the First World War, a couple arrive at a luxury hotel where the husband is murdered. A number of people fall under suspicion, including the head waiter. He undertakes an investigation to find the real culprit.

== Cast ==
- Hans Albers as Andrei Antonovitch Wolodkin
- Brigitte Horney as Nastasja Andrejevna Daschenko
- Alexander Engel as Fedor Fedorovich Daschenko
- René Deltgen as Sergei Gavrilovitch Schuvalov
- Gusti Huber as Darja Sergejewna Plagina
- Käthe Dorsch as Anna Fedorovna Orlowa
- Jakob Tiedtke as Leonid Alexandrovitch Schapkin
- Aribert Wäscher as Pavel Pavlovitch
- Hans Leibelt as Untersuchungsrichter
- Paul Westermeier as Schlittenkutscher
- Carl Auen as Kriminalbeamter
- Fritz Berghof as Aribor
- Hellmuth Bergmann as Wachmann
- Paul Bildt as Bettler
- Horst Birr as Wanja - Hotelangestellter
- Günther Brackmann as Page
- Walter Brückner as Zuschauer im Varieté
- Viktor Carter as Junger Uniformierter
- Jac Diehl as Zuschauer im Varieté
- Michael Distler as Russe
- Erich Dunskus as Aufseher
- Max Harry Ernst as Hotelangestellter
- Karl Etlinger as Igor Andrej - Tubaspieler
- Erich Fiedler as Etagenkellner
- Paul Ludwig Frey as Untersuchungsrichter
- Lothar Glathe as Zuschauer im Varieté
- Ralph-Willy Grunert as Hotelangestellter
- Albert Hugelmann as Insasse im Nachtasyl
- Margot Höpfner as Tänzerin
- Herbert Hübner as Julio Simkowitsch - Personalchef
- Carl Iban as Insasse im Nachtasyl
- Babette Jenssen as Zimmermädchen
- Josef Karma as Insasse im Nachtasyl
- Jens Keith as Tänzer
- Harald Maresch
- Hans Meyer-Hanno as Insasse im Nachtasyl
- Werner Pledath as Michael Trofinawitsch - Etagenkellner
- Tine Schneider as Zuschauerin im Varieté
- S.O. Schoening as Russischer Budenbesitzer
- Rudolf Schündler as Geschäftsführer des 'Savoy'
- Friedrich Teitge as Drehorgelspieler
- Tommy Thomas as Hotelpage
- Walter von Allwoerden as Schreiber des Untersuchungsrichters
- Else Ward as Russin bei Osterfeierlichkeit
- Raimund Warta as Hotelangestellter
- Eduard Wenck as Iwan Iwanowitsch - Hotelportier
- Ewald Wenck as Schlittenkutscher

== Reception ==
Writing for The Spectator in 1936, Graham Greene gave the film a positive review, characterizing it as an "agreeably [...] slow, good-humoured murder-story". Praising Engel's acting as particularly vivid, Greene summarized the film, claiming: "melodramatic passions are given a pleasantly realistic setting by a very competent director and a first-class cameraman".

== Bibliography ==
- Bock, Hans-Michael & Bergfelder, Tim. The Concise CineGraph. Encyclopedia of German Cinema. Berghahn Books, 2009.
- Klaus, Ulrich J. Deutsche Tonfilme: Jahrgang 1936. Klaus-Archiv, 1988.
