= Ernst Erich Buder =

German composer (1896–1962)

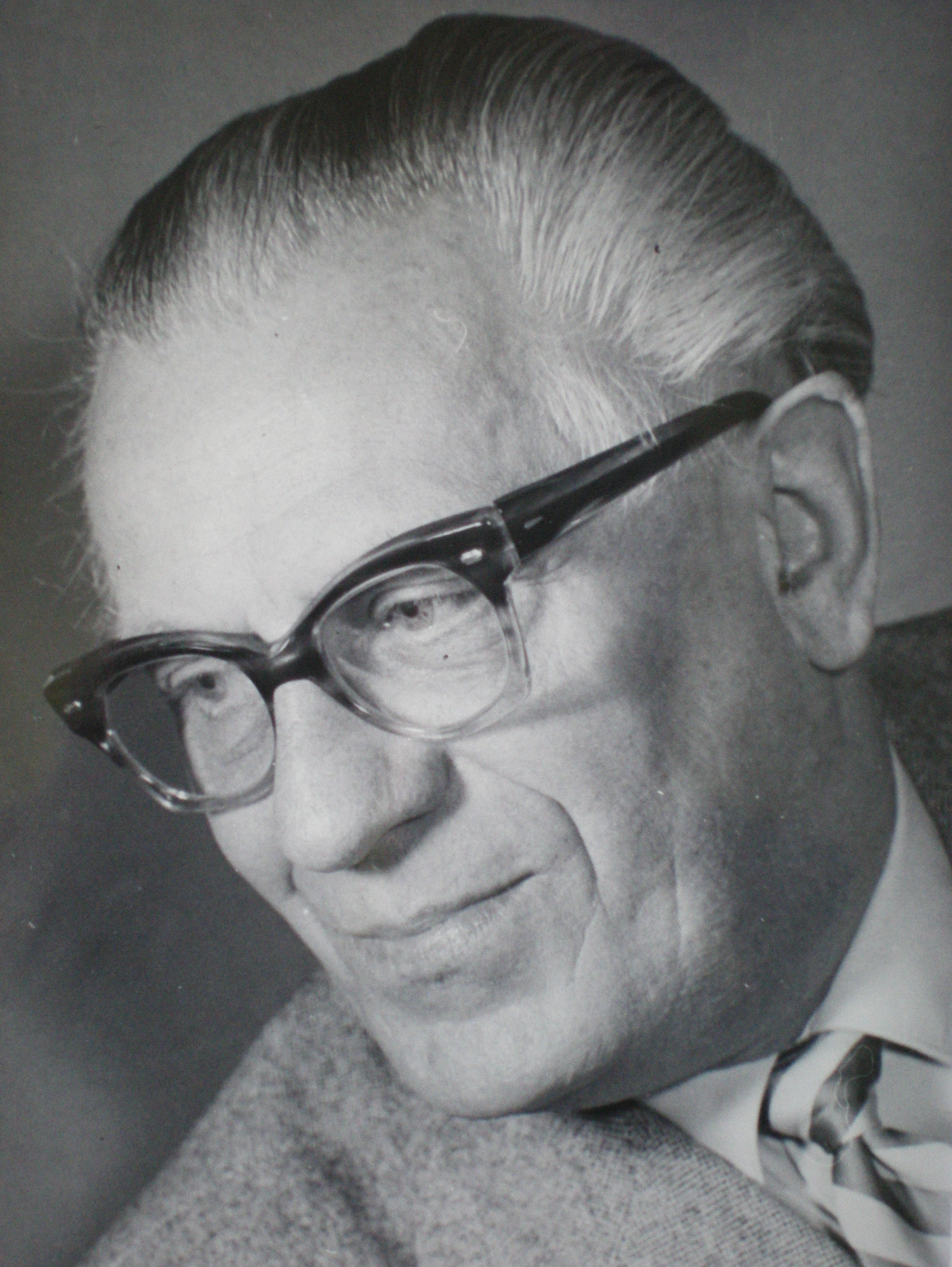
- Born: 2 September 1896; Cottbus, German Empire
- Died: 21 January 1962 (aged 65); West Berlin, West Germany
- Occupation: Composer
- Years active: 1931–1952 (film)

Ernst Erich Buder (1896–1962) was a German composer. He worked on around forty film scores during his career.

== Selected filmography ==
- Circus Life (1931)
- The Other Side (1931)
- Student Life in Merry Springtime (1931)
- Night Convoy (1932)
- Tannenberg (1932)
- Refugees (1933)
- Goodbye, Beautiful Days (1933)
- At the End of the World (1934)
- Roses from the South (1934)
- Dream Love (1935)
- Dreams of Love (1935)
- Marriage Strike (1935)
- Happy Days in Aranjuez (1936)
- Women's Regiment (1936)
- Autobus S (1937)
- Love Can Lie (1937)
- Urlaub auf Ehrenwort (1938)
- New Year's Eve on Alexanderplatz (1939)
- Light of Heart (1943)
- Harald Arrives at Nine (1944)

== Bibliography ==
- Giesen, Rolf. Nazi Propaganda Films: A History and Filmography. McFarland, 2003.
