= Carl Hoffmann =

German cinematographer and film director (1885–1947)

- Born: June 9, 1885
- Died: July 13, 1947 (aged 62)
- Occupations: Cinematographer and film director

Carl Hoffmann (9 June 1885, in Neisse – 13 July 1947) was a German cinematographer and film director.

== Selected filmography ==
=== Cinematographer ===
- The Vice (1915)
- Dr. Hart's Diary (1917)
- Wedding in the Eccentric Club (1917)
- The Plague of Florence (1919)
- Der Herr der Liebe (1919)
- The Woman with Orchids (1919)
- Madness (1919)
- Prince Cuckoo (1919)
- The Head of Janus (1920)
- Patience (1920)
- Uriel Acosta (1920)
- Figures of the Night (1920)
- Kurfürstendamm (1920)
- Der Graf von Cagliostro (1920)
- The Eyes of the World (1920)
- Lady Hamilton (1921)
- The Lord of the Beasts (1921)
- The House on the Moon (1921)
- The Conspiracy in Genoa (1921)
- Country Roads and the Big City (1921)
- The Flight into Death (1921)
- Dr. Mabuse: The Gambler (1922)
- A Dying Nation (1922)
- Money in the Streets (1922)
- Madame de La Pommeraye's Intrigues (1922)
- The Stone Rider (1923)
- Siegfried (1924)
- The Other Woman (1924)
- Die Nibelungen (1924)
- Varieté (1925)
- Express Train of Love (1925)
- The Woman Who Did (1925)
- Faust (1926)
- A Sister of Six (1926)
- The Bordellos of Algiers (1927)
- Eva and the Grasshopper (1927)
- Ungarische Rhapsodie (1928)
- Hungarian Rhapsody (1928)
- The Mysterious Mirror (1928)
- Looping the Loop (1928)
- High Treason (1929)
- The Wonderful Lies of Nina Petrovna (1929)
- The Tiger Murder Case (1930)
- The Immortal Vagabond (1930)
- A Student's Song of Heidelberg (1930)
- Hocuspocus (1930)
- The Temporary Widow (1930)
- The Flute Concert of Sanssouci (1930)
- Yorck (1931)
- The Wrong Husband (1931)
- In the Employ of the Secret Service (1931)
- The Girl and the Boy (1931)
- Two Hearts Beat as One (1932)
- Man Without a Name (1932)
- Congress Dances (1932)
- How Shall I Tell My Husband? (1932)
- Narcotics (1932)
- Marschall Vorwärts (1932)
- The White Demon (1932)
- Season in Cairo (1933)
- Inge and the Millions (1933)
- Waltz War (1933)
- Court Waltzes (1933)
- The Tunnel (1933)
- The Tunnel (1933, French version)
- Peer Gynt (1934)
- The Csardas Princess (1934)
- Gold in New Frisco (1939)
- The Leghorn Hat (1939)
- Liberated Hands (1939)
- The Girl from Barnhelm (1940)
- The Girl from Fano (1941)
- Via Mala (1945)

=== Director ===
- The Mysterious Mirror (1928)
- Lessons in Love (1935)
- Victoria (1935)
- The Merry Wives (1936)
- After Midnight (1938)
