= The Immortal Vagabond (1930 film) =

1930 film by Gustav Ucicky and Joe May

- German: Der unsterbliche Lump
- Directed by: Gustav Ucicky; Joe May
- Written by: Felix Dörmann (operetta); Edmund Eysler (operetta); Karl Hartl; Robert Liebmann
- Produced by: Joe May; Günther Stapenhorst
- Starring: Liane Haid; Gustav Fröhlich; Hans Adalbert Schlettow
- Cinematography: Carl Hoffmann
- Music by: Ralph Benatzky; Edmund Eysler
- Production company: Universum Film AG
- Distributed by: Universum Film AG
- Release date: 21 February 1930
- Running time: 97 minutes
- Country: Germany
- Language: German

The Immortal Vagabond (German: Der unsterbliche Lump) is a 1930 German musical film directed by Gustav Ucicky and Joe May and starring Liane Haid, Gustav Fröhlich and Hans Adalbert Schlettow. It is an operetta film, made by German's largest film company UFA. Interiors were shot at the Babelsberg Studios in Berlin. The film's sets were designed by Robert Herlth and Walter Röhrig. The film was remade in 1953.

== Cast ==
- Liane Haid as Anna 'Annerl'
- Gustav Fröhlich as Hans Ritter
- Hans Adalbert Schlettow as Franz Lechner
- Karl Gerhardt as tour guide
- Attila Hörbiger
- Paul Hörbiger
- Ernst Behmer
- Julius Falkenstein
- Jaro Fürth
- Lutz Götz
- Fritz Greiner
- Paul Henckels
- Karl Platen
- Georg H. Schnell
- Oskar Sima
- Eugen Thiele
- Hermann Thimig
- Weiß Ferdl
- Rudolf Teubler
- Rudolf Meinhard-Jünger
