= Hanussen (1955 film) =

1955 film

- Directed by: O. W. Fischer; Georg Marischka
- Written by: Gerhard Menzel; Curt Riess
- Produced by: Eberhard Klagemann
- Starring: O. W. Fischer; Liselotte Pulver; Siegfried Lowitz
- Cinematography: Helmut Ashley
- Edited by: Wolfgang Wehrum
- Music by: Hans-Martin Majewski
- Production company: Royal Film
- Distributed by: Deutsche Film Hansa
- Release date: 14 September 1955
- Running time: 95 minutes
- Country: West Germany
- Language: German

Hanussen is a 1955 West German drama film directed by O. W. Fischer and Georg Marischka and starring Fischer, Liselotte Pulver and Siegfried Lowitz. It was shot at the Bavaria Studios in Munich. The film's sets were designed by the art directors Robert Herlth and Hermann Warm.

== Cast ==
- O. W. Fischer as Erik Jan Hanussen
- Liselotte Pulver as Hilde Graf
- Theodor Danegger
- Maria Dominique as Grace Coligny
- Werner Finck as Der Sachverständige
- Klaus Kinski as Erik von Spazier a.k.a. Mirko
- Reinhard Kolldehoff as Biberger
- Rolf Kralovitz
- Walter Ladengast
- Margrit Läubli as Tanzgirl
- Ludwig Linkmann as Herr Scholz
- Siegfried Lowitz as Prosecutor
- Erni Mangold as Priscilla Pletzak
- Franz Muxeneder as Jaroslav Huber
- Helmut Qualtinger as Ernst Röhm
- Kai-Siegfried Seefeld (as Kai S. Seefeld)
- Hermann Speelmans as Maus
- Wastl Witt as Leopold Ebenseder

== Bibliography ==
- Bock, Hans-Michael & Bergfelder, Tim. The Concise CineGraph. Encyclopedia of German Cinema. Berghahn Books, 2009.
