= In the Employ of the Secret Service =

1931 film

- German film poster
- German: Im Geheimdienst
- Directed by: Gustav Ucicky
- Written by: Walter Reisch
- Produced by: Noë Bloch; Arnold Pressburger; Gregor Rabinovitch
- Starring: Brigitte Helm; Willy Fritsch; Oskar Homolka
- Cinematography: Carl Hoffmann
- Music by: Werner Schmidt-Boelcke
- Production company: UFA
- Distributed by: UFA
- Release date: 14 August 1931
- Running time: 106 minutes
- Country: Germany
- Language: German

In the Employ of the Secret Service (German: Im Geheimdienst) is a 1931 German drama film directed by Gustav Ucicky and starring Brigitte Helm, Willy Fritsch, and Oskar Homolka. It concerns espionage between Germany and Russia during the First World War. It was made at the Babelsberg Studios in Berlin with sets designed by the art directors Robert Herlth and Walter Röhrig. Location shooting took place in Denmark.

== Cast ==
- Brigitte Helm as Vera Lanskaja
- Willy Fritsch as Thomas Higgins
- Oskar Homolka as Lanskoi
- Theodor Loos as Dubbin
- Karl Ludwig Diehl as Wasiljeff
- Harry Hardt as Kaulwitz
- Ferdinand Hart as Tomilin
- Tamara Desni as Natascha
- Eduard von Winterstein as Chefen for spionagen
- Friedrich Kayßler as Bethmann-Hollweg
- Alfred Beierle as Sokaluk
- Aenne Goerling
- Margarete Schön as Hans hustru
- Ferdinand Bonn as Dr. Kaempff
- Paul Mederow
- Alexander Murski as Ewreinoff
- Georg H. Schnell as Nikolajewski
- Walter Steinbeck
