= The Flute Concert of Sanssouci =

1930 film

- Film poster
- Directed by: Gustav Ucicky
- Written by: Johannes Brandt; Walter Reisch
- Produced by: Günther Stapenhorst
- Starring: Otto Gebühr; Renate Müller; Hans Rehmann
- Cinematography: Carl Hoffmann
- Music by: Willy Schmidt-Gentner
- Production company: UFA
- Distributed by: UFA
- Release date: 19 December 1930
- Running time: 88 minutes
- Country: Germany
- Language: German

The Flute Concert of Sanssouci (German: Das Flötenkonzert von Sans-souci) is a 1930 German drama film directed by Gustav Ucicky and starring Otto Gebühr. It was part of the popular cycle of Prussian films. It was made at the Babelsberg Studios. The film's sets were designed by the art director Robert Herlth and Walter Röhrig. Location filming took place around the Berlin area including at the Sanssouci Palace in Potsdam.

== Plot ==
In 1756, a masked ball is being celebrated in the Dresden Palais of the Saxon Minister Heinrich von Brühl. The event serves as cover for confidential talks being held with the envoys of Austria, Russia and France with the aim of conspiring against the Prussian King Frederick II. The Prussian envoy, Major von Lindeneck, sees through the charade and succeeds in bringing a copy of the concluded secret treaty to the Prussian king.

Friedrich consults with his generals, who urge caution. Initially stunned by the conspiracy, Friedrich develops a plan. To do this, he sends von Lindeneck back to Dresden. However, the latter is not very enthusiastic about this, as he thinks he has reason to doubt his wife Blanche's marital fidelity, and he now has to leave her alone. But loyalty to the king is more important to him and he carries out all the orders of the Prussian king.

When the envoys of Austria, Russia and France ask for an audience with Friedrich, he gives a flute concerto to gain time. (This event is based on a famous picture by Adolph von Menzel.) In the course of this concert he receives a telegram from Vienna which completely uncovers the plot. He ends the concert and orders the declaration of war to be handed to the envoys. He goes outside and announces that he has just given marching orders for the regiments. The Seven Years' War begins.

== Cast ==
- Otto Gebühr as Friedrich II
- Renate Müller as Blanche von Lindeneck
- Hans Rehmann as Major von Lindeneck
- Walter Janssen as Maltzahn
- Raoul Aslan as Heinrich von Brühl
- Friedrich Kayßler as Count Karl-Wilhelm Finck von Finckenstein
- Carl Goetz as Michael Gabriel Fredersdorf
- Aribert Wäscher as Poellnitz
- Margarete Schön as Princess Amalie
- Theodor Loos as Menzel
- Hans Brausewetter as Correspondent
- Paul Biensfeldt as Johann Joachim Quantz
- Vladimir Sokoloff as Russian Envoy
- Friedrich Kühne as Schwerin
- Alfred Beierle as Wolf Frederick von Retzow
- Georg John as Ziethen
- Theo Lingen as Kent

== Bibliography ==
- Hoffmann, Hilmar (1996). The Triumph of Propaganda: Film and National Socialism, 1933–1945. Providence: Berghahn Books. ISBN 978-1-57181-122-6.
