= Alexander Engel =

German actor

- Born: Kurt Engel; 4 June 1902; Berlin, German Empire
- Died: 25 July 1968 (aged 66); Saarbrücken, West Germany
- Occupation: Actor
- Years active: 1932–1968

Alexander Engel, birth name: Kurt Engel (4 June 1902 – 25 July 1968) was a German film actor. He appeared in more than 70 films between 1932 and 1968. He was born in Berlin, Germany and died in Saarbrücken, West Germany. He chose the stage name "Alexander", to prevent confusion with the popular musician Kurt Engel.

== Selected filmography ==
- Playing with Fire (1921)
- The Love Express (1931)
- Venetian Nights (1931)
- Hasenklein kann nichts dafür (1932) - Fritz - Bürodiener
- Young Dessau's Great Love (1933) - Kandidat Schmitt
- Music in the Blood (1934) - Klinkermann, erster Geiger
- Princess Turandot (1934)
- One Too Many on Board (1935) - Ingenieur Sparkuhl
- Savoy Hotel 217 (1936) - Fedor Fedorovich Daschenko
- Schlußakkord (1936) - Mr. Smith
- Under Blazing Heavens (1936) - Theater director
- White Slaves (1937) - Turbin
- Madame Bovary (1937) - Homais, Apoteker
- The Yellow Flag (1937) - Dr. Martinez - Arzt - Quarantäne-Sation
- Another World (1937) - Dr. Jerrys, Arzt
- Schüsse in Kabine 7 (1938) - Reverend Smith
- After Midnight (1938) - Wronski
- Ballade (1938) - Schattenwitz, des Herzog's Vater
- Sergeant Berry (1938) - Gomez
- War es der im 3. Stock? (1939) - Iwan, Diener
- The Green Emperor (1939) - Sekretär Favard
- The Fourth Is Not Coming (1939) - Holmin, Privatsekretär
- The Wedding Trip (1939) - Second Guest, the 'Drinker'
- Parkstrasse 13 (1939) - Diener Fedor
- The Curtain Falls (1939) - Cadoni
- The Strange Woman (1939) - Samuli
- Brand im Ozean (1939) - Käpt'n Gold
- Commissioner Eyck (1940) - van Fliet
- Golowin geht durch die Stadt (1940) - Marisch, Redakteur
- Alarm (1941) - Barpianist Ölkers
- Vom Schicksal verweht (1942) - Prof.Forster
- Attack on Baku (1942) - Steffens, ein englischer Agent
- Sieben Briefe (1944) - Dr. Torda
- The Blue Swords (1949) - Herr von Tschirnhausen
- Und wenn's nur einer wär' (1959) - Oberschulrat
- The Merry Wives of Windsor (1950) - Innkeeper Reich (Page)
- Heart of Stone (1950) - Lisbeths Oheim
- The Colourful Dream (1952)
- Hit Parade (1953) - Prof. Hochstätter
- Das Fräulein von Scuderi (1955) - La Regnie
- My Children and I (1955) - Herr Knirsch
- Ein Herz schlägt für Erika (1956)
- Winter in the Woods (1956) - Seifert
- Made in Germany (1957) - Kurator von Eggeling
- Das Glück liegt auf der Straße (1957) - Prof. Fruehauf
- Mischief in Wonderland (1957)
- A Time to Love and a Time to Die (1958) - Mad Air Raid Warden
- Taiga (1958) - Sazarin
- Mandolins and Moonlight (1959)
- The Return of Dr. Mabuse (1961) - Prof. Griesinger
- The Strange Countess (1961) - Patient
- The Indian Scarf (1963) - Rev. Hastings
- The Hangman of London (1963) - Bodenspekulant
- Long Legs, Long Fingers (1966) - Arzt
- The Hound of Blackwood Castle (1968) - Doc Adams
- Death and Diamonds (1968) - Owner of Minicars Racing Center (uncredited)
- Two Undercover Angels (1969) - Albert Carimbuli
