= Under Blazing Heavens =

- Directed by: Gustav Ucicky
- Written by: Gerhard Menzel
- Starring: Hans Albers; Lotte Lang; Aribert Wäscher
- Cinematography: Fritz Arno Wagner
- Edited by: Herbert B. Fredersdorf
- Music by: Theo Mackeben
- Production company: UFA
- Distributed by: UFA
- Release date: 23 December 1936
- Running time: 101 minutes
- Country: Germany
- Language: German

Under Blazing Skies or Under Blazing Heavens (German: Unter heißem Himmel) is a 1936 German adventure film directed by Gustav Ucicky and starring Hans Albers, Lotte Lang and Aribert Wäscher. It was shot at the Babelsberg Studios in Berlin and on location on the Aegean Sea coast of Greece. The film's sets were designed by the art directors Robert Herlth and Walter Röhrig. It was produced and distributed by UFA, Germany's largest film company. The film was popular enough to be given a second release in West Germany in 1950.

== Cast ==
- Hans Albers as Capt. Kellersperg
- Lotte Lang as Rosa Ferugas
- Aribert Wäscher as Calfa
- Eberhard Leithoff as Ghazarian
- Alexander Engel as Theater director
- René Deltgen as Groppi
- Bruno Hübner as Dr. Negruzzi
- Hans Leibelt as Police Inspector
- Ida Turay as Frau Rießelschmidt
- Adolf Gondrell as Herr Rießelschmidt
- Jack Trevor as Mr. Hicks
- Ellen Frank as Fräulein Altamont
- Erna Fentsch as Vera von Biron
- Reinhold Bernt as 1. Offizier auf der Gorboduc
- Franz Nicklisch as 2. Offizier auf der Gorboduc
- Willi Schur as Sanitätsgehilfe
- Angelo Ferrari as Kommissar der Strompolizei
- Gustav Püttjer as Kolk, Matrose
- Alfred Beierle as Polizeikommissar
- S.O. Schoening as Vorsitzender des Polizeigerichts
- Josef Dahmen as Polizeiarzt
- Ernst Rotmund as Verehrer von Rosa
- Werner Scharf as 1. Offizier der Emmaos
- Walter Ladengast as Pferdepfleger
- Wilfried Seyferth as Pop, Matrose
- Hans Schultze as Bochmann
- Eva Genschow as Barbesucherin
- Michael von Newlinsky as Ober

== Bibliography ==
- Kreimeier, Klaus. The Ufa Story: A History of Germany's Greatest Film Company, 1918-1945. University of California Press, 1999.
