= Season in Cairo =

1933 film

- Directed by: Reinhold Schünzel
- Written by: Walter Reisch
- Produced by: Günther Stapenhorst
- Starring: Renate Müller; Willy Fritsch; Gustav Waldau
- Cinematography: Carl Hoffmann
- Edited by: Eduard von Borsody
- Music by: Werner R. Heymann
- Production company: UFA
- Distributed by: UFA
- Release date: 20 July 1933
- Running time: 80 minutes
- Country: Germany
- Language: German

Season in Cairo (German: Saison in Kairo) is a 1933 German musical comedy film directed by Reinhold Schünzel and starring Renate Müller, Willy Fritsch and Gustav Waldau. A French-language version Idylle au Caire was released, also featuring Müller. The film's sets were designed by the art directors Robert Herlth and Walter Röhrig. It was shot on location in Egypt at Giza and Cairo, with interior filming taking place at the Babelsberg Studios in Berlin.

== Synopsis ==
In Cairo, American Tobby Blackwell is worried about the extravagant, pampered lifestyle of his mother Elinor, the widow of a wealthy magnate. Meanwhile Stefanie is worried about the debauched, womanising antics of her father, the Count of Weidling-Weidling. They plan to bring them together, but unknown to them, their parents plan to do the same for their children. Elinor is attracted to the idea of her son marrying into European nobility while the near-penniless aristocrat is delighted with the idea of his daughter marrying into money. Towards this end, they announce the engagement of their children at a public event. Fearful of causing a scandal, the two agree to a wedding as a marriage of convenience followed by a quick divorce. However, during a trip into the desert they begin to develop real feelings for each other.

== Cast ==
- Renate Müller as Stefanie von Weidling-Weidling, Tochter
- Willy Fritsch as Tobby Blackwell, Sohn
- Gustav Waldau as Leopold Graf von Weidling-Weidling
- Leopoldine Konstantin as Ellinor Blackwell
- Anton Pointner as Giacomo Ottaviani
- Jakob Tiedtke as Exzellenz Ismael Pascha
- Angelo Ferrari as 1st Gigolo
- Kurt Hagen as 2nd Gigolo
- Erik Ode as 3rd Gigolo

== Bibliography ==
- Bock, Hans-Michael; Bergfelder, Tim, eds. (2009). The Concise Cinegraph: Encyclopaedia of German Cinema. New York: Berghahn Books. ISBN 978-1-57181-655-9.
- Elsaesser, Thomas (2000). Weimar Cinema and After: Germany's Historical Imaginary. London: Routledge. ISBN 978-1-135-07859-1.
- Hake, Sabine (2001). Popular Cinema of the Third Reich. Austin: University of Texas Press. ISBN 978-0-292-73458-6.
