= The Heart Must Be Silent =

- Directed by: Gustav Ucicky
- Written by: Gerhard Menzel
- Produced by: Karl Künzel
- Starring: Paula Wessely; Mathias Wieman; Werner Hinz
- Cinematography: Günther Anders
- Edited by: Henny Brünsch
- Music by: Willy Schmidt-Gentner
- Production company: Wien Film
- Distributed by: Deutsche Filmvertriebs
- Release date: 19 December 1944
- Running time: 92 minutes
- Country: Germany
- Language: German

The Heart Must Be Silent (German: Das Herz muß schweigen) is a 1944 German drama film directed by Gustav Ucicky and starring Paula Wessely, Mathias Wieman and Werner Hinz. It was produced by Wien Film in the Austrian capital of Vienna, which had been part of Greater Germany since the Anschluss of 1938. It was given further release by West German distributor Deutsche London Film in 1950.

The film's sets were designed by the art directors Fritz Jüptner-Jonstorff and Otto Niedermoser.

== Cast ==
- Paula Wessely as Maximiliane Frey
- Mathias Wieman as Dr. Paul Holzgruber
- Werner Hinz as Freiherr von Bonin
- Gerda Brunner as Mimi von Bonin
- Erik Frey as Robert
- Rolf Truxa as Leopold Welischer
- Alfred Neugebauer as Sanitätsrat Wendemuth
- Karl Skraup as Herr Welischer
- Lotte Lang as Emma Welischer
- Franz Böheim as Erich
- Mimi Shorp as Maria
- Rosl Dorena as Hilde
- Rudolf Brix as Junger Mann
- Ernst Pröckl as Fritz
- Lotte Martens as Junge Dame
- Waltraut Klein as Junge Dame
- Karl Ehmann as Geßner, Diener

== Bibliography ==
- Von Dassanowsky, Robert. Austrian Cinema: A History. McFarland, 2005.
