= The Empress and I =

1933 film

- Directed by: Friedrich Hollaender
- Written by: Paul Frank; Robert Liebmann; Walter Reisch; Felix Salten
- Produced by: Erich Pommer
- Starring: Lilian Harvey; Mady Christians; Conrad Veidt; Heinz Rühmann
- Cinematography: Friedl Behn-Grund
- Edited by: Heinz G. Janson; René Métain
- Music by: Franz Waxman
- Production company: UFA
- Distributed by: UFA
- Release date: 23 April 1933
- Running time: 82 minutes
- Country: Germany
- Language: German

The Empress and I (German: Ich und die Kaiserin) is a 1933 German musical comedy film directed by Friedrich Hollaender and starring Lilian Harvey, Mady Christians and Conrad Veidt. It is also known by the alternative title of The Only Girl. The film was produced as a multi-language version. Moi et l'impératrice a separate French-language version was released as well as The Only Girl in English. Multilingual Harvey played the same role in all three films.

It was shot at the Babelsberg Studios in Berlin. The film's sets were designed by the art directors Robert Herlth and Walter Röhrig. It was made by Erich Pommer's production unit at UFA, several members of which left the country after the film's release due to the Nazi Party's assumption of power.

== Synopsis ==
After a fall from a horse, a wealthy Marquis is believed to be dying. Lying on his supposed deathbed, he is comforted by the singing of a beautiful woman. When he unexpectedly recovers, he tries to seek out this young woman. Due to a series of confusions, he believes her to be Empress Eugenie, the wife of Napoleon III of France. In fact, the woman was a Eugenie's hairdresser, a vivacious young woman engaged to be married to an aspiring composer and conductor currently working for the celebrated Jacques Offenbach.

== Cast ==
- Lilian Harvey as Juliette
- Mady Christians as Empress
- Conrad Veidt as Marquis de Pontignac
- Heinz Rühmann as Didier
- Friedel Schuster as Annabel
- Hubert von Meyerinck as Flügeladjutant
- Julius Falkenstein as Jacques Offenbach
- Paul Morgan as Erfinder des Fahrrades
- Hans Hermann Schaufuß as Doctor
- Kate Kühl as Marianne
- Heinrich Gretler as Sanitäter
- Eugen Rex as Etienne, Diener des Marquis
- Hans Deppe
- Hans Nowack as Erfinder des Telefons
- Margot Höpfner

== Bibliography ==
- Bock, Hans-Michael & Bergfelder, Tim. The Concise CineGraph. Encyclopedia of German Cinema. Berghahn Books, 2009.
