= Calais-Dover =

1931 film

- Directed by: Anatole Litvak; Jean Boyer
- Written by: Julius Berstl (novel); Irma von Cube; Anatole Litvak
- Produced by: Noë Bloch; Arnold Pressburger; Gregor Rabinovitch
- Starring: Lilian Harvey; André Roanne; Armand Bernard
- Cinematography: Robert Baberske; Franz Planer
- Edited by: Aleksandr Uralsky
- Music by: Mischa Spoliansky
- Production company: UFA
- Distributed by: L'Alliance Cinématographique Européenne
- Release date: 18 September 1931
- Running time: 87 minutes
- Countries: France; Germany
- Language: French

Calais-Dover (French: Calais-Douvres) is a 1931 French-German comedy film directed by Jean Boyer and Anatole Litvak and starring Lilian Harvey, André Roanne and Armand Bernard. It is the French-language version of the German film No More Love, with Harvey reprising her role. The title refers to the Dover–Calais ferry. It incorporated location shooting on the French Riviera with interiors shot at the Babelsberg Studios in Berlin. The film's sets were designed by the art directors Robert Herlth, Walter Röhrig and Werner Schlichting.

== Cast ==
- Lilian Harvey as Gladys O'Halloran
- André Roanne as MacFerson
- Armand Bernard as Jean
- Rina Marsa as Claire
- Robert Darthez as Jack
- Sinoël as Dr. Baskett
- André Gabriello as Tom
- Frédéric Mariotti as a Spanish sailor
- Margo Lion as La diseuse du Zanzi-Bar
- Guy Sloux as Rheinlaender, the staff leader
- Damia as Singer

== Bibliography ==
- Bock, Hans-Michael; Bergfelder, Tim, eds. (2009). The Concise Cinegraph: Encyclopaedia of German Cinema. New York: Berghahn Books. ISBN 978-1-57181-655-9.
