= Hocuspocus (1930 film) =

1930 film

- German film poster
- German: Hokuspokus
- Directed by: Gustav Ucicky
- Written by: Walter Reisch; Karl Hartl
- Based on: Hokuspokus by Curt Goetz
- Produced by: Günther Stapenhorst
- Starring: Lilian Harvey; Willy Fritsch; Oskar Homolka
- Cinematography: Carl Hoffmann
- Music by: Willy Schmidt-Gentner; Robert Stolz
- Production company: UFA
- Distributed by: UFA
- Release date: 11 July 1930
- Running time: 83 minutes
- Country: Germany
- Language: German

Hocuspocus (German: Hokuspokus) is a 1930 German comedy film parallel version directed by Gustav Ucicky, starring Anglo-German Lilian Harvey, Willy Fritsch, and Oskar Homolka. It was the first adaptation of the 1926 play Hokuspokus by Curt Goetz, but used different role names.

== Plot ==
After mediocre painter Paul Kellermann has disappeared, interest in his paintings rises, until his soft-spoken widow Kitty Kellermann is accused of having murdered her husband by drowning him in a lake, with the body never found. The court case draws public attention, and with the defendant entangling herself in contradictions, her lawyer steps down.

For the night before the court session that likely will sentence Kitty Kellermann, a mysterious person had warned chief judge Grandt that somebody wants to kill him. Grandt sent a telegram to his best friend, a lawyer, to come from abroad for support. A surprise visitor shows up at night and seemingly provides ample evidence to both that the killer is Grandt's best friend and lawyer, knowing about the terms of Paul Kellermann's will, and with the intention to take advantage of that, had bought the ticket well before he received the telegram, and had poisoned his wine. The judge is as shocked as the lawyer, they call the police. The mysterious person is handcuffed yet quickly free again.

After making his point that things are not always as they may seem, as simple sleight of hand "hocus-pocus" tricks like some sugar in the wine and a forged date on a ticket apparently had convinced the judge within minutes that his long-term friend has evil intentions, the mysterious visitor declares that he is Peter Bille, a former circus artist, escape artist, illusionist, speed painter, trick shooter, thus a hocus pocus, and also a jurist that wants to defend poor and innocent Mrs. Kellermann. He even hands the judge the weapon that killed the painter: a razor.

With the new lawyer, the court case draws even more public attention, as more witnesses and exhibits like a boat and a painting are brought in - a painting owned by the judge and taken from his house.

== Cast ==
- Lilian Harvey as Kitty Kellermann
- Willy Fritsch as Peter Bille
- Oskar Homolka as Grandt
- Gustaf Gründgens as Dr. Wilke
- Otto Wallburg as Dr. Schüler
- Fritz Schmuck as Hartmann
- Ferdinand von Alten as Lindborg
- Harry Halm as Kolbe
- Rudolf Biebrach as Morchen
- René Hubert as Loiret
- Kurt Lilien as Kulicke
- Ruth Albu as Anny Sedal
- Max Ehrlich as Kuhnen

== Production ==
The film sets were designed by the art directors Robert Herlth and Walter Röhrig. Both versions were shot at the Babelsberg Studios.

The English-language version was made at the same time, The Temporary Widow, the title referring to one of the paintings. Also directed by Ucicky and starring bi-lingual Lilian Harvey, Laurence Olivier acted in his first full movie. Two more German movies were made after the war, both with the original role names (Agda Kjerulf instead of Kitty Kellermann, and so on), one with Curt Goetz himself, in 1953, and another, after Goetz's death, in 1966 (the latter in color).
