= Käthe von Nagy =

Hungarian actress (1904–1973)

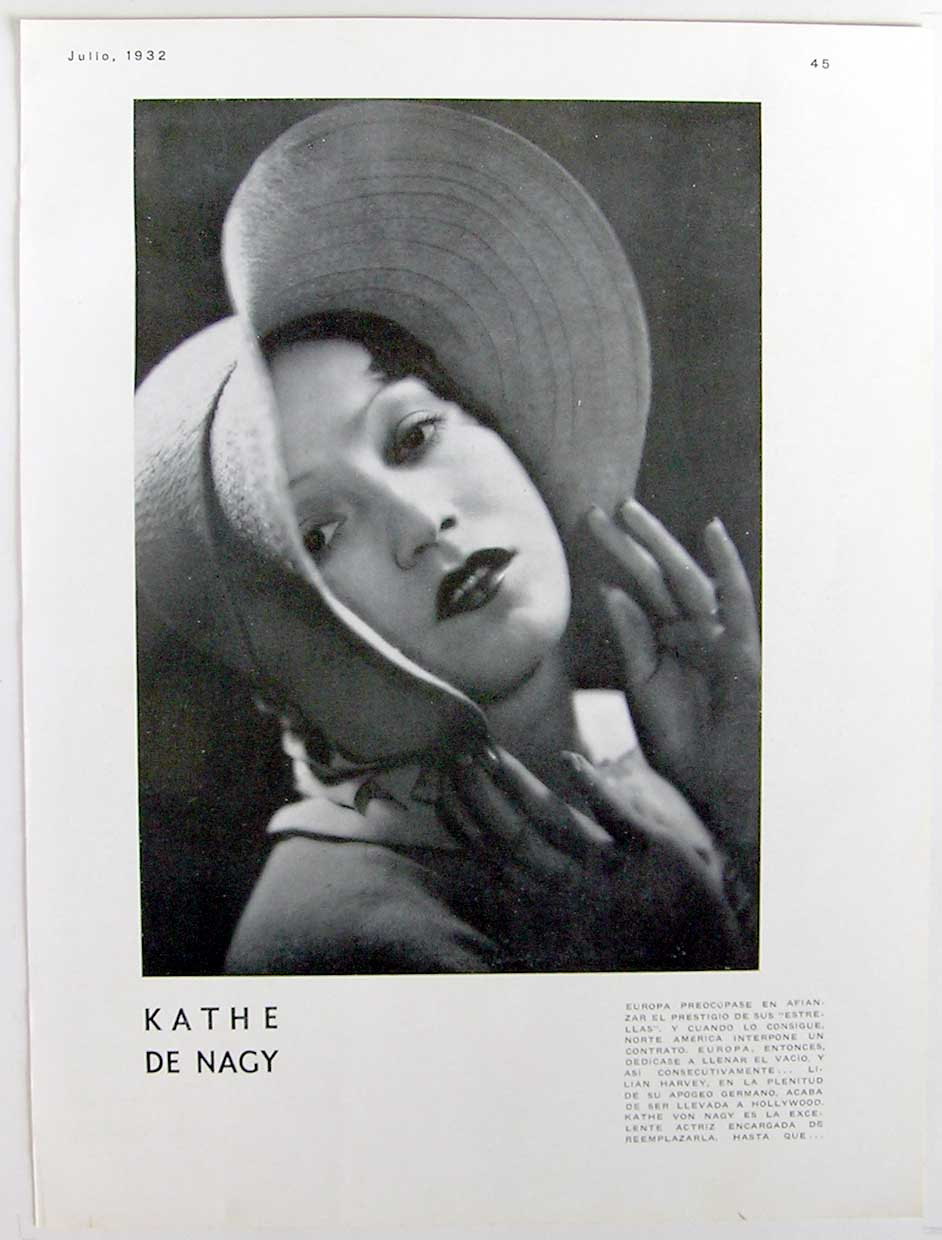
- Watercolor postcard of Käthe von Nagy from 1934
- Born: Ekaterina Nagy von Cziser; 4 April 1904; Szabadka, Kingdom of Hungary, Austria-Hungary
- Died: 20 December 1973 (aged 69); United States
- Other names: Kathy von Nagy; Käthe de Nagy; Kate de Nagy; Nagy Kató
- Occupations: Actress; model; dancer; singer
- Years active: 1929–1952
- Spouses: Constantin J. David; Jacques Fattini

Ekaterina Nagy von Cziser, stage name Käthe von Nagy (4 April 1904 – 20 December 1973), was a Hungarian actress, model, dancer, and singer who worked in German and French cinema.

== Early life and education ==
Käthe von Nagy, the daughter of a wealthy bank manager and part of an aristocratic Serbian family, spent very little time at monastery school.

When she wanted to get married at age 16, her parents did not approve and placed her in the Sancta Christiana Convent in Frohsdorf near Vienna to prevent the early marriage. After 18 months in the convent, she went to high school in Vienna, and then finally to boarding school. During this period, she took riding and fencing lessons.

== Career ==
As a young adult, Nagy's dream was to become an author, also unusual for a woman of her time. She went to Budapest, where she wrote a few short articles that were eventually published in a magazine. Shortly after this, she decided to pursue her interest in acting and enrolled in the acting school of Béla Gáal, near Budapest. There she learned acting, dancing, and singing. Her parents were unhappy about her change of career and frequent moves. To satisfy her parents (especially her father), she returned and worked with him in his bank for a period of time, while secretly writing novels.

In 1926, Nagy moved to Berlin to pursue a career in the film industry, but, as an unknown, she took a position as correspondent for the Hungarian newspaper Pesti Hírlap to earn a living. After numerous futile applications in the city, Hungarian film director Alexander Korda got her a role as an actress in the 1927 comedy film Männer vor der Ehe, opposite her future husband, Constantin J. David. Soon after, in 1928, she starred in the successful Wien, die Stadt meiner Träume ("Vienna, City of My Dreams"), which made her known as the "up-and-coming young actress of the European cinema". She later appeared in many leading roles and became famous for her countless postcards which also benefitted her modeling career. In 1931, she starred in Le Capitaine Craddock, which made her popular in France where she would later make half her movies. After 1937, she appeared mainly in French-speaking roles, but also appeared in Italian and Austrian film productions. Her last film was the German film The Forester's Daughter, in 1952, alongside Johanna Matz.

During the Second World War, Nagy virtually retired from the acting industry, appearing in only one movie, Mahlia la métisse. Because of her famous and hugely popular postcards, she was, in 1940, reportedly approached by Reichsführer-SS, Heinrich Himmler, who asked her to be the face and body for sex dolls provided to German soldiers as a way to combat syphilis at the front, but she refused. This story has come to be considered a hoax, due to the lack of reliable sources.

== Personal life ==
Nagy's first marriage was to film director Constantin J. David, in 1927, the year they met. Her second marriage was to Jacques Fattini; little is known about their relationship and marriage. She died of cancer in 1973, in Ojai, California, aged 69.

== Filmography ==
Year	Title	Role	Notes
1927	Männer vor der Ehe	The young girl	Silent film
1927	Der Anwalt des Herzens (Attorney for the Heart)		Silent film
1927	Le bateau de verre (The Glass Boat)	Anni	Silent film
1927	Gustav Mond ... Du gehst so stille (You Walk So Softly)	Frieda Krause	Silent film
1928	Die Sandgräfin		Silent film
1928	Die Durchgängerin (The Runaway Girl)	Ilsebill Thoms	Silent film
1928	Wien, du Stadt meiner Träume (Vienna, City of My Dreams)	Countess Mizzi Lichtenau	Silent film
1928	Die Republik der Backfische (The Republic of Flappers)	Billie van Santen	Silent film
1929	Der Weg durch die Nacht		Silent film
1929	Rotaie (Rails)	The young girl	Silent film / Italian-language film
1929	Mascottchen (Mascots)	Margot	Silent film
1929	Aufruhr im Junggesellenheim (Revolt in the Batchelor's House)	Käthe	Silent film
1929	Die kleine Veronika	Veronika Weber	Silent film
1930	Les Saltimbanques / Gaukler	Suzanne Daniela	German- and French-language film
1930	Der Andere (The Other)	Amalie Frieben	German-language film
1931	Ihre Majestät die Liebe (Her Majesty the Barmaid)	Lia Török	German-language film
1931	Ihre Hoheit befiehlt (Her Grace Commands)	Princess Marie-Christine	German-language film
1931	Meine Frau, die Hochstaplerin (My Wife, the Impostor)	Jutta Bergmann	German-language film
1931	Le Capitaine Craddock (Captain Craddock)	Queen Yola	French-language film
1931	Ronny	Ronny	German-language film
1931	Ronny	Ronny	French-language film
1932	Der Sieger (The Victor)	Helene	German-language film
1932	Le Vainqueur	Helene	French-language film
1932	Das schöne Abenteuer (The Beautiful Adventure)	Hélène de Trevillac	German-language film
1932	La Belle Aventure (The Beautiful Adventure)	Hélène de Trevillac	French-language film
1932	Ich bei Tag und Du bei Nacht (I by Day, You by Night)	Grete	German-language film
1932	À moi le jour, à toi la nuit	Juliette	French-language film
1933	Refugees	Kristja Laudy	German-language film
1934	Au bout du monde (At the End of the World)	Christine Laudy	French-language film
1934	Einmal eine große Dame sein (Just Once a Great Lady)	Kitty Holm	German-language film
1934	Un jour viendra (A Day Will Come)	Kitty	French-language film
1934	Die Freundin eines großen Mannes (The Girlfriend of a Big Man)	Marga Köhler	German-language film
1934	Die Töchter ihrer Exzellenz	Gerti von Petrin	German-language film
1934	La Jeune Fille d'une nuit	Betty	French-language film
1934	Der junge Baron Neuhaus (The Young Baron Neuhaus)	Christl Palm	German-language film
1934	Nuit de mai (Night in May)	Christel Palm	French-language film
1934	Liebe, Tod und Teufel (Love, Death and the Devil)	Kokua	German-language film
1934	Prinzessin Turandot (Princess Turandot)	Turandot	German-language film
1935	Turandot, princesse de Chine (Turandot, Princess of China)	Turandot	French-language film
1935	La Route impériale	Joyce Stark	French-language film
1935	Le Diable en bouteille (The Devil in the Bottle)	Kolua	French-language film
1935	Die Pompadour	Madame de Pompadour	German-language film
1936	Ave Maria	Claudette	German-language film
1937	Cargaison blanche (White Cargo)	Marion Baker	French-language film
1937	The Silent Battle	Draguicha	French-language film
1938	Nights of Princes	Hélène	French-language film
1938	Die unruhigen Mädchen	Trixi	German-language film
1938	Am seidenen Faden (By a Silken Thread)	Lissy Eickhoff	German-language film
1938	Unsere kleine Frau	Dodo	German-language film
1938	Mia moglie si diverte	Dodo	Italian-language film
1938	Accord final (Final Accord)	Hélène Vernier	French-language film
1939	Salonwagen E 417	Baroness Ursula von Angerfeld	German-language film
1939	Renate im Quartett (Renate in the Quartet)	Renate Schmidt	German-language film
1943	Mahlia la métisse (Mahlia the Mestiza)	Mahlia	French-language film
1948	Cargaison clandestine (Secret Cargo)	Luisa Helm	French-language film
1952	Die Försterchristl (The Forester's Daughter)	Countess Josefine	German-language film
