= The Young Baron Neuhaus =

1934 film

- German film poster
- German: Der junge Baron Neuhaus
- Directed by: Gustav Ucicky
- Written by: Stephan Kamare (play); Gerhard Menzel; Gustav Ucicky
- Produced by: Günther Stapenhorst
- Starring: Viktor de Kowa; Käthe von Nagy; Christl Mardayn
- Cinematography: Friedl Behn-Grund
- Edited by: Eduard von Borsody
- Music by: Alois Melichar
- Production company: UFA
- Distributed by: UFA
- Release date: 14 September 1934
- Running time: 85 minutes
- Country: Germany
- Language: German

The Young Baron Neuhaus (German: Der junge Baron Neuhaus) is a 1934 German historical drama film directed and co-written by Gustav Ucicky and starring Viktor de Kowa, Käthe von Nagy and Christl Mardayn. Produced and distributed by UFA, it was shot at the company's Babelsberg Studios in Berlin and on location around Vienna. The film's sets were designed by the art directors Robert Herlth and Walter Röhrig.

== Plot ==
Vienna, 1753. The young Empress Maria Theresa wants to be a shining example for her subjects, whose morality worries her. She is particularly annoyed by the widespread habit of "Fensterln", meaning young gentlemen paying nighttime visits to young ladies by entering their bedrooms through the window. The monarch therefore plans to urgently change something about this "bad habit" and is looking for morally stable allies in her endeavour.

One day, Her Majesty is recommended the supposedly modest Baron Neuhaus, on whom her lady-in-waiting, Countess Christl Palm, has cast an eye. In order to score points with the Empress, the young Baron Neuhaus follows some of the advice of young Toni, a chambermaid for Countess Palm. One night Baron Neuhaus wants to thank Toni and climbs through an open window into a room where the chambermaid is sleeping. When a guard notices the open window and footprints leading to the room, he sounds an alarm. Neuhaus barely escapes and hides in a barrel. Promptly it starts to pour, the barrel fills up, and the young Baron Neuhaus becomes soaking wet. On the way home, he accidentally leaves behind a coat borrowed from Toni, which belongs to her uncle, the stove heater Stockel, a small man of advanced age.

This incident becomes the talk of the town and causes great indignation. On the advice of Countess Palm, the Empress commissions Baron Neuhaus, of all people, to investigate this case of blatant immorality. Innocent Stockel becomes the center of the suspicion due to the coat left behind. Neuhaus eventually confesses to Countess Christl that he himself was the "sinner". After his confession to the Countess, he goes to the Empress to admit his guilt. The Countess joins him and tells the Empress that Neuhaus climbed into Toni's room only to meet with her and everything occurred in perfect modesty.

Maria Theresa commissions a grand equestrian festival. Following the completion of the tournament, Countess Christl is awarded a ring. By tradition, the winner is allowed to pass the ring on to the man she loves. The Countess passes the ring to Baron Neuhaus and he proposes to her, thereby averting the scandal hanging over the Imperial Court.

== Cast ==
- Viktor de Kowa as Baron Neuhaus
- Käthe von Nagy as Countess Christl Palm
- Christl Mardayn as Toni
- Hans Moser as K.u.K. stove heater Stockel
- Lola Chlud as Empress Maria Theresa
- Annie Rosar as Frau Stockel
- Rudolf Carl as Egelseder
- Wilhelm Schich as Oysberger
- Beppo Brem as Gaisberger
- Karl Hellmer as Sikora
- Oskar Sima as Sergeant
- Hansjörg Adolfi as Richter Wögerl
- Eduard Kandl as Badelhartinger
- Julius Brandt
- Helga Demmer
- Rudolf Essek
- Josef Herrgesell
- Helene Lauterböck
- Kurt von Lessen
- Heinz Martini
- Karl Meixner
- Hanns Obonya
- Klaus Pohl
- Josef Reithofer
- Betty Sedlmayr
- Walter Simlinger as Heurigensänger
- Ernst Baebler as Heurigensänger
- Maria Paudler
