= Morgenrot (film) =

1933 film

- Directed by: Vernon Sewell; Gustav Ucicky
- Written by: Gerhard Menzel (Idea: Edgar von Spiegel von und zu Peckelsheim)
- Produced by: Gunther Stapenhorst
- Starring: Rudolf Forster; Fritz Genschow; Paul Westermeier; Camilla Spira
- Music by: Herbert Windt
- Distributed by: Universum Film AG (UFa)
- Release date: 2 February 1933
- Running time: 81 minutes
- Countries: Weimar Republic; Nazi Germany
- Language: German

Morgenrot is a 1933 German submarine film set during World War I. The film was directed by Vernon Sewell (in his directorial debut) and Gustav Ucicky

Released three days after Adolf Hitler became Chancellor, it was the first film to have its screening in Nazi Germany. It became a symbol of the new times touted by the Nazi regime. The title (literally "morning-red") is the German term for the reddish coloring of the eastern sky in advance of sunrise. Dawn was the U.S. title. It was filmed in Kiel, Schleswig-Holstein, the first German submarine movie made after World War I.

== Plot ==
Set in 1915, the film offered up a highly fictionalised version of the 1916 death of the British War Secretary, Field Marshal Herbert Kitchener aboard the cruiser HMS Hampshire, on his way to Russia. A successful U-boat ace, Helmut Liers, lives in the fictional north German town of Meerskirchen with his mother, who has already lost two sons in the war. Liers is the local hero of Meerskirchen due to his command of U-21 and the first part of the film concerns the high-spirited adventures of Liers and his crew while on leave. Everyone thinks that Helga, the daughter of the burgermeister of Meerskirchen is in love with Lieutenant Phipps "Fips" Fredericks, but in fact she is in love with the older man Liers. The Majorin (Lier's mother), tries to get him a shore assignment, which he blocks, saying that he will fight on until Germany either wins the war or he dies, and then goes out to sea on his latest mission.

In the second part of the film, the German Navy learns that a very important British military leader – who is not named in the film, but is clearly meant to be Kitchener – has boarded a cruiser taking him to Arkhangelsk, leading Liers and his U-boat being sent out to essentially assassinate him by sinking the cruiser, a task which is performed successfully (in reality, the Hampshire was sunk by a mine laid by an U-boat, but not in a torpedo attack). Afterwards, a Q ship (a disguised British merchant cruiser), which illegally flies the flag of neutral Denmark, ambushes Liers's submarine, which is badly damaged. A squadron of British destroyers pursue U-21 across the North Sea, which is finally sunk and comes to rest on the seabed. Two of the U-21 crew members including Fips sacrifice themselves to save the others including Liers who make their way back to the Fatherland. The film ends with Liers boarding a new submarine to once again go out to continue the war at sea with the last shot being a close-up of the Imperial German Navy Ensign, which flutters proudly in the wind.

== Cast ==
- Rudolf Forster - Kapitanleutnant Helmut Liers
- Fritz Genschow - Oberleutnant 'Phipps' Fredericks
- Adele Sandrock - Liers' Mother
- Camilla Spira - GreteJaul, Fredericks' girl
- Paul Westermeier - Seaman Jaul
- Gerhard Bienert - Seaman Böhm
- Friedrich Gnaß - Juraczik
- Franz Nicklisch - Petermann
- Hans Leibelt - Bürgermeister von Meerskirchen
- Else Knott - Helga, Jaul's girl
- Eduard von Winterstein - Hauptmann Kolch

== Production ==
In March 1927, the UFA studio, the largest film production company in Europe, was purchased by the media magnate Alfred Hugenberg, who wanted to own UFA to produce "national" films that glorified his right-wing politics. Morgenrot was one of the several "national" films that were released by UFA during Hugenberg's time as its owner. Despite Hugenberg's hopes, the UFA studio was heavily in debt at the time he purchased it and the transition from silent films to talkies imposed significant new costs on UFA and, as a result, UFA tended to release films with the widest possible appeal instead of the "national" films that Hugenberg had wanted to see produced. For Hugenberg, profits trumped his politics with UFA and, contrary to expectations, there was no purge of UFA's Jewish employees after he brought the studio as he did not want to lose talent to rival studios. Only a minority of UFA films released between 1927 and 1933 were the sort of films that Hugenberg had wanted to see produced.

The script was for Morgenrot was written by Gerhard Menzel, a successful writer from Silesia who had won the Kleist prize for the best new German play in 1927, who was also a Nazi party member. In turn, Menzel was inspired by an idea submitted by the writer Edgar von Spiegel von und zu Peckelsheim. However, Hugenberg intended for Morgenrot to aid his party, the DNVP (Deutsche Nationale Volkspartei - German National People's Party), which he became the leader of in 1928, not the NSDAP (Nationalsozialistische Deutsche Arbeiterpartei - National-socialist German Workers' Party) .

The film was also part of an effort to rehabilitate the reputation of the Imperial Germany Navy and of navalism in general. The November Revolution of 1918, the alleged "stab-in-the-back" that defeated Germany just as the Reich was alleged to be on the verge of victory, had started with the great High Seas Fleet mutiny. In October 1918, the mistreated sailors of the High Seas Fleet turned against their officers after being ordered to set sail on a "death ride" into the North Sea to take on the combined Anglo-American Grand Fleet in a battle expected to end in the destruction of the High Seas Fleet at a time when it was already clear that the war was lost. Besides for being mistreated by their officers, who delighted in humiliating them in various petty ways, the sailors of the High Seas Fleet justified the mutiny under the grounds that the war was already lost, making the planned "death ride" utterly pointless and that it was better to live another day than to die now for a lost cause. For the German right, the High Seas Fleet mutiny had given the Navy a vile reputation as a place of mutiny and treason, where the November revolution that had toppled the House of Hohenzollern had begun. Releasing a film featuring a heroic U-boat ace, who is honored to fight and if necessary die for the Fatherland, was intended by the navalist Hugenberg to dissipate the popular image of mutinous sailors waving about red flags, and provide a more positive image of the Imperial Navy. Much of what can be described as Morgenrot's pro-death message with its portrayal of death in war as noble, honorable and even erotic was intended as a sort of rebuttal to the mutinous sailors of the High Seas Fleet. One of the slogans used by the High Seas Fleet sailors when they mutinied in 1918 was "We want to live as free men, not die as slaves!"

The title of the film comes from a 19th-century poem by the Romantic writer Wilhelm Hauff whose first lines read: "Morgenrot, morgenrot/Leuchtest mir zum frühen Tod?/Bald wird die Trompete blasen/Dann muss ich Leben lassen/Ich und mancher Kamerad" ("Morning dawn, morning dawn/Do you glow to me to the early death?/Soon the trumpet will sound/Then I have to give up my life/Me and some comrades"). The film was directed by Gustav Ucicky, an Austrian-born director who continued his career under the Nazi government. A submarine was borrowed from the Finnish Navy for use in the film, but the Finnish were not told what the film was about.

== Motifs ==
The film offered a heroization of death, with the captain Liers explicitly stating that Germans may not know how to live, but they know how to die. In a central scene, the captain of the submarine offers to his men that he and the first officer will go down with the ship in order that they may escape; they refuse on the grounds it will be all or none of them, and the captain glorifies the chance to die with such men, a theme that commonly appeared in Nazi-era films. The first officer Fredericks, having learned that the woman he loves is in love with captain, not himself, and another sailor commit suicide to save the others – a common way to resolve love triangles in Nazi films, where the heroic death saves the man from failure. On the other hand, the Majorin refuses to rejoice over her son's success in sinking the cruiser and with it Lord Kitchener because of the suffering of war, saying that the men abroad the Hampshire also had families – a theme that would not appear in Nazi film. The American historian John Leopold argued that Morgenrot was more of a DVNP film than a Nazi film, noting the film "...emphasized traditional nationalist concepts and stressed the advantages of mature leadership as well as the value of youthful exuberance".

The British historian Jonathan Rayner described the scenes set in the U-boat as highly realistic and authentic as befitting a film shot on an actual submarine, which gave the audience some idea of just how dangerous and claustrophobic life was on submarines in World War One. Through the German submarine service was a new one, lacking long traditions, but the sheer dangerousness of submarine duty conferred on the submariners the status of an elite force, which Rayner wrote portrayed very well. Rayner also wrote that the action scenes such as the sinking of the Hampshire, the battle with the Q-ship, and the final confrontation with the destroyers were all exciting, well done and realistic, making the film into one of the best pre-World War Two submarine films, and as a film that served as a template for many subsequent submarine films. Rayner also notes that film portrayed the Germans as behaving with more honor than the British as Liers declines to sink the Q-ship despite the concerns of his men who suspect that the ship is a Q-ship. The climax of the film, where Fredericks and another sailor sacrificed themselves to save the other eight creates a blood debt as Liers tells the others: "Our lives are not longer ours. We must sail as long as we have breath, again and again, until God gives us leave". Rayner described the film's message as: "The crew's kinship, maintained up and beyond death, surpasses emotional connections on the shore, and compels the German sailors to honor the dead members of the shipboard family in ceaseless service". Though the film ends in 1915, the devotion to duty showed by Liers and his crew stands in marked contrast to the sailors of the High Seas Fleet who mutinied in 1918.

The film is notable for its misogyny with its message that femininity equals weakness and masculinity equals strength. A key plot in the film are the efforts of Liers's wealthy mother to get him a shore assignment as she has already lost two sons to the war, an effort which her son successfully blocks, saying he would rather die for the Fatherland than shirk his patriotic duty. The female dominated home front in Germany is portrayed as a place of sexual temptation and weakness, in contrast to the harsh and all-male world of the U-boat at sea, which for its all discomforts and dangers, is portrayed in a more favorable light than the home front. The conflict between Liers vs. his mother over what she calls his todessehnsucht (literally "longing for death", through "contempt for life" is a more accurate translation) is in fact the film's major conflict. Lier's mother calls his todessehnsucht "a new kind of religion", a charge that he does not deny, merely saying in response that "We Germans may not how to live, but we know how to die". Lier's mother represents the pre-1914 Germany, which for its all its decency and civility does not have the necessary toughness to survive in a world that is portrayed as merciless and cruel. By contrast, Liers with his love of action and violence together with a general contempt for human life represents the hard, ruthless "New Man" spawned by the war, who for his all rough edges and todessehnsucht paradoxically does the necessary toughness to survive.

== Release ==
The film was approved by the censors on 26 January 1933, and premiered on 31 January. Its gala premiere in Berlin on 2 February 1933 was attended by Adolf Hitler, who was recently appointed chancellor. Josef Goebbels wrote in his diary that Morgenrot was "a good film within its limits". Critical reception towards Morgenrot was generally favorable with the critics praising the acting and the direction with the film being praised as exciting and brisk. It was banned in Poland and the Netherlands.

The Frankfurter Zeitung, the most prestigious newspaper in Germany, unusually put its review of Morgenrot on its front page, where the film critic of the Frankfurter Zeitung praised the Morgenrot as one of the best German films ever made. However, critics noted that the scenes on the home front were idealtypischer Bilder ("ideal typical picture") in contrast to the scenes set on U-21 submarine, which were praised for their realism. The character of the Majorin played by Adele Sandrock, was described as the film's most memorable character, which was certainly not the intention of the film's producers. The film critic of Vorwärts, the newspaper of the SDP, in one of his last film reviews (Vorwärts was banned later in February 1933) wrote with the character of the Majorin "any nationalist tendency was taken from the film", judging that the arguments made by the Majorin were stronger than those made by Liers. The film critic of Völkischer Beobachter, the newspaper of the NSDAP, in his positive review wrote: "Morgenrot-may it be a symbol for the beginning of a new era". The Berlin correspondent of The New York Times who attended the premiere reported that "It is a film of exceptional qualities, aside from its propagandistic tendencies". Together with the 1931 film Yorck, Morgenrot was one of the most financially successful of UFA's "national" films released under Hugenberg.

The film generated much controversy in Britain in 1933 due to its depiction of the British Reviewers were quick to notice that the unnamed British military leader who goes down on a cruiser on his way to Russia was meant to be Kitchener. Additionally, the film's general picture of "English perfidy" as the British only managed to damage Liers's U-boat by illegally flying the Danish flag on a British ship, which suggested that the British could only defeat the Germans via underhanded methods also generated controversy in Britain. The film was debated in the House of Commons after Sir Charles Cayzer, 3rd Baronet demanded that the Foreign Office have the Foreign Office make an official protest against Morgenrot. Foreign Secretary John Simon, 1st Viscount Simon found himself during the debates in the House of Commons "...in the rather odd position of having to defend a Nazi film".

== Awards ==
The National Board of Review of Motion Pictures awarded it with Best Foreign Film for 1933.

== Works cited ==
- Hull, David (1969). Film in the Third Reich: Art and Propaganda in Nazi Germany. Simon & Schuster. SBN 671214861.
- Waldman, Harry (2008). Nazi Films In America, 1933-1942. McFarland & Company. ISBN 9780786438617.
- Welch, David (1983). Propaganda and the German Cinema: 1933-1945. I.B. Tauris. ISBN 9781860645204.

== Bibliography ==
- Baird, Jay W. (1974). The Mythical World of Nazi War Propaganda. University of Minnesota Press. ISBN 978-0-8166-0741-9.
- Fox, Jo (2007). Film Propaganda in Britain and Nazi Germany World War II Cinema. Oxford: Berg Publishers. ISBN 9781859738962.
- Leiser, Erwin (1975). Nazi Cinema. Macmillan. ISBN 978-0-02-570230-1.
- Leopold, John (1977). Alfred Hugenberg The Radical Nationalist Campaign against the Weimar Republic. New Haven: Yale University Press. ISBN 0-300-02068-6.
- Kester, Bernadette; Veenkamp, Hans (2003). Film Front Weimar Representations of the First World War in German Films of the Weimar Period (1919-1933). Amsterdam: Amsterdam University Press. ISBN 9789053565971.
- Rayner, Jonathan (2007). The Naval War Film Genre, History and National Cinema. Manchester: Manchester University Press. ISBN 9780719070983.
