= Gustav Ucicky =

Austrian film director

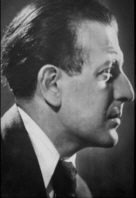
- Gustav Ucicky (1930)
- Born: 6 July 1899; Vienna, Austria-Hungary
- Died: 27 April 1961 (aged 61); Hamburg, West Germany
- Occupation: Film director
- Years active: 1916–1961

Gustav Ucicky (6 July 1899 – 27 April 1961) was an Austrian film director, screenwriter, and cinematographer. He was one of the more successful directors in Austria and Germany from the 1930s through to the early 1960s. His work covered a wide variety of genres, but he is most acclaimed for his work in romantic drama and drama films.

== Biography ==
Born in Vienna, Ucicky is often stated to have been the illegitimate son of painter Gustav Klimt for whom his mother Marie Učická from Prague worked and modeled, although this paternity is unconfirmed. He had begun an apprenticeship as a graphic designer, when he entered the film industry at the age of 17. He died in 1961 while preparing to direct The Last Chapter.

== Selected filmography ==
=== Cinematographer ===
- Gold (1919)
- Golgatha (1920)
- Wege des Schreckens (1921)
- Sodom and Gomorrah (1922)
- The Golden Butterfly (1926)
- Should We Be Silent? (1926)
- The Third Squadron (1926)

=== Director ===
- Die Pratermizzi (1927)
- Café Elektric (1927)
- Tingel-Tangel (1927)
- A Better Master (1928)
- Restless Hearts (1928)
- Inherited Passions (1929)
- The Convict from Istanbul (1929)
- The Flute Concert of Sanssouci (1930)
- Hocuspocus (1930)
- The Temporary Widow (1930)
- The Immortal Vagabond (1930)
- Yorck (1931)
- In the Employ of the Secret Service (1931)
- Man Without a Name (1932)
- Morgenrot (1933)
- Refugees (1933)
- At the End of the World (1934)
- Night in May (1934)
- The Young Baron Neuhaus (1934)
- Joan of Arc (1935)
- Savoy Hotel 217 (1936)
- Under Blazing Heavens (1936)
- The Broken Jug (1937)
- Frau Sixta (1938)
- A Mother's Love (1939)
- Uproar in Damascus (1939)
- Ein Leben lang (1940)
- Der Postmeister (1940)
- Heimkehr (1941)
- Late Love (1943)
- Am Ende der Welt (1944)
- Der gebieterische Ruf (1944)
- The Heart Must Be Silent (1944)
- Singende Engel (1947)
- After the Storm (1948)
- Der Seelenbräu (1950)
- Cordula (1950)
- Until We Meet Again (1952)
- The Chaplain of San Lorenzo (1953)
- The Witch (1954)
- A Life for Do (1954)
- Zwei blaue Augen (1955)
- The Hunter of Fall (1956)
- Der Edelweißkönig (1957)
- The Saint and Her Fool (1957)
- The Girl from the Marsh Croft (1958)
- The Priest and the Girl (1958)
- The Inheritance of Bjorndal (1960)
