= Alois Melichar =

Austrian composer and conductor (1896–1976)

- Born: 18 April 1896; Vienna, Austro-Hungarian Empire
- Died: 9 April 1976 (aged 79); Munich, Bavaria, West Germany
- Occupation: Composer
- Years active: 1933-1956 (film)

Alois Melichar (18 April 1896, in Vienna – 9 April 1976, in Munich) was an Austrian composer, conductor, arranger, and music critic. He was a student of Joseph Marx at the Vienna Academy of Music, then of Franz Schreker at the Hochschule für Musik in Berlin, but later became increasingly culturally conservative.

From 1923 to 1926 Melichar was in the Caucasus, where he collected materials on Caucasian folk songs. He then lived in Berlin and Vienna. As a composer, he followed the safe footpath of Max Reger, Hans Pfitzner, and Paul Graener; he wrote a symphonic poem, Der Dom (1934); Rhapsodie über ein schwedisches Volkslied (1939); Lustspiel-Ouvertüre (1942); lieder; and film music.

Under contract to UFA he composed music for many films during the National Socialist period.

After World War II Melichar became increasingly polemic in his attacks on modernist music. His pamphlets include Die unteilbare Musik ("Indivisible music" 1952), Musik in der Zwangsjacke ("Music in the Straitjacket" 1958), and Schönberg und die Folgen ("Schoenberg and his Consequences" 1960).

== Selected filmography ==
- Court Waltzes (1933)
- Night in May (1934)
- Song of Farewell (1934)
- Farewell Waltz (1934)
- The Young Baron Neuhaus (1934)
- Forget Me Not (1935)
- The Private Life of Louis XIV (1935)
- Stradivarius (1935)
- The Gypsy Baron (1935)
- If It Were Not for Music (1935)
- Stradivari (1935)
- The Girl Irene (1936)
- Love's Awakening (1936)
- The Beggar Student (1936)
- Land of Love (1937)
- Mother Song (1937)
- Nanon (1938)
- Capriccio (1938)
- Maria Ilona (1939)
- Immortal Waltz (1939)
- Falstaff in Vienna (1940)
- The Girl from Barnhelm (1940)
- Comrades (1941)
- My Life for Ireland (1941)
- The Girl from Fano (1941)
- Riding for Germany (1941)
- Attack on Baku (1942)
- Rembrandt (1942)
- Music in Salzburg (1944)
- Die Fledermaus (1946)
- The Immortal Face (1947)
- Anni (1948)
- Ulli and Marei (1948)
- The Heavenly Waltz (1948)
- The Blue Straw Hat (1949)
- Kissing Is No Sin (1950)
- Two Times Lotte (1950)
- The Secret of a Marriage (1951)
- Maria Theresa (1951)
- Don't Forget Love (1953)
- Dreaming Lips (1953)
- Diary of a Married Woman (1953)
- Love is Forever (1954)
- Dunja (1955)
- Son Without a Home (1955)

== Bibliography ==
- Schmidl, Stefan (2018). The Film Scores of Alois Melichar. Studies in the Music of Austro-German Cinema 1933–1956. Vienna: Morawa. ISBN 978-3-99084-003-0.
