= Gerhard Menzel =

German screenwriter (1894–1966)

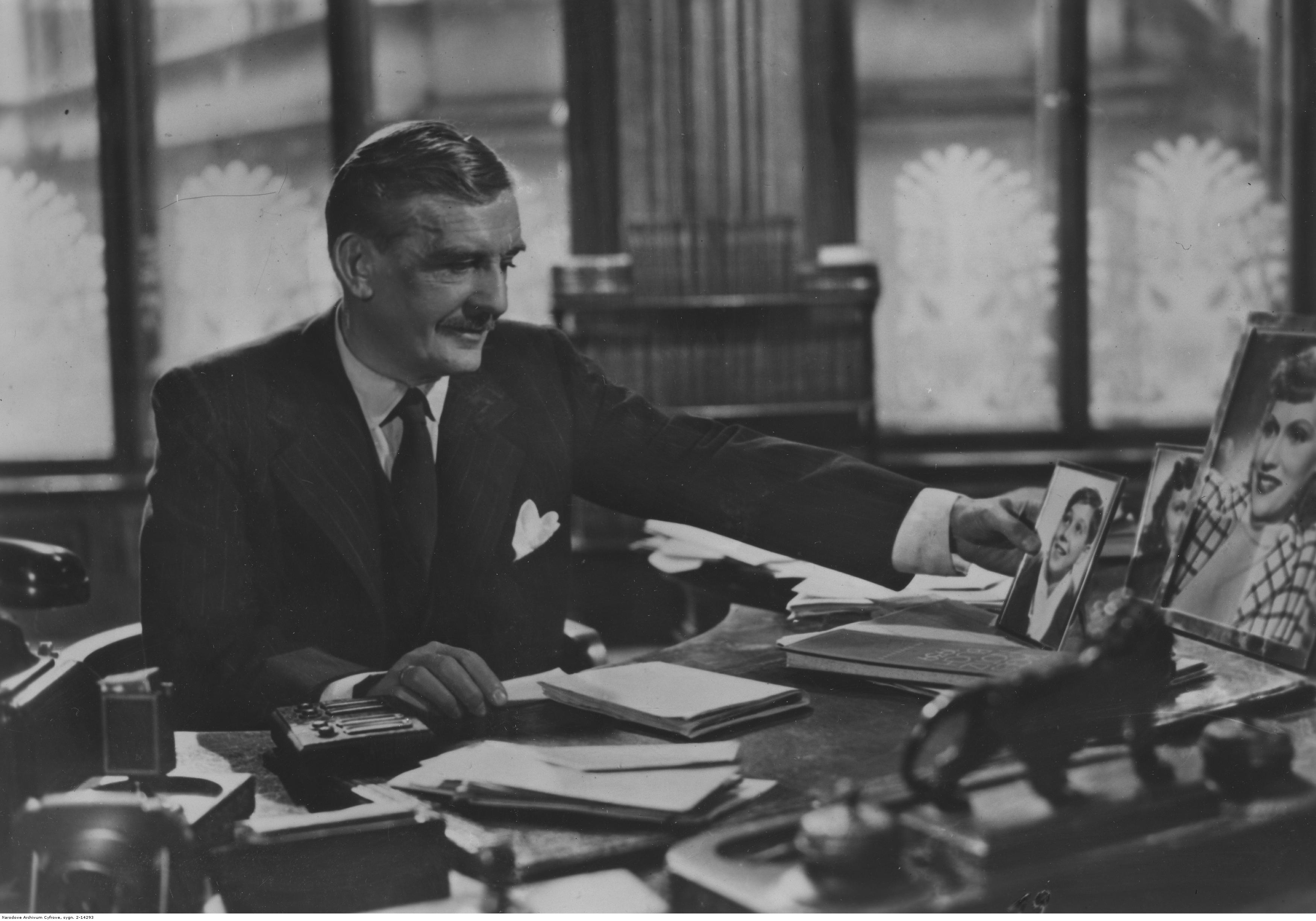
- Born: 29 September 1894; Waldenburg, Kingdom of Prussia, German Empire
- Died: 4 May 1966 (aged 71); Comano, Ticino, Switzerland
- Occupation: Screenwriter
- Years active: 1933–1965

Gerhard Menzel (29 September 1894 – 4 May 1966) was a German screenwriter. He wrote for nearly 40 films between 1933 and 1965. He was supportive of Nazism and worked for Nazi propaganda. He was responsible for writing the script of Heimkehr, one of the most infamous pieces of Nazi cinema, which featured racism and hateful images of Poles.

He was born in Waldenburg, Lower Silesia, German Empire (now Wałbrzych, Poland) and died in Comano, Ticino, Switzerland.

== Selected filmography ==
- Morgenrot (1933)
- Refugees (1933)
- Night in May (1934)
- The Young Baron Neuhaus (1934)
- Savoy Hotel 217 (1936)
- Under Blazing Heavens (1936)
- Wells in Flames (1937)
- La Habanera (1937)
- Woman in the River (1939)
- A Mother's Love (1939)
- Robert Koch (1939)
- Heimkehr (1941)
- Thrice Wed (1941)
- The Great King (1942)
- Destiny (1942)
- Late Love (1943)
- The Heart Must Be Silent (1944)
- The Sinner (1951)
- Hanussen (1955)
- Ich suche Dich (1956)
- King in Shadow (1957)
