= Henri Chomette =

French actor, screenwriter and film director

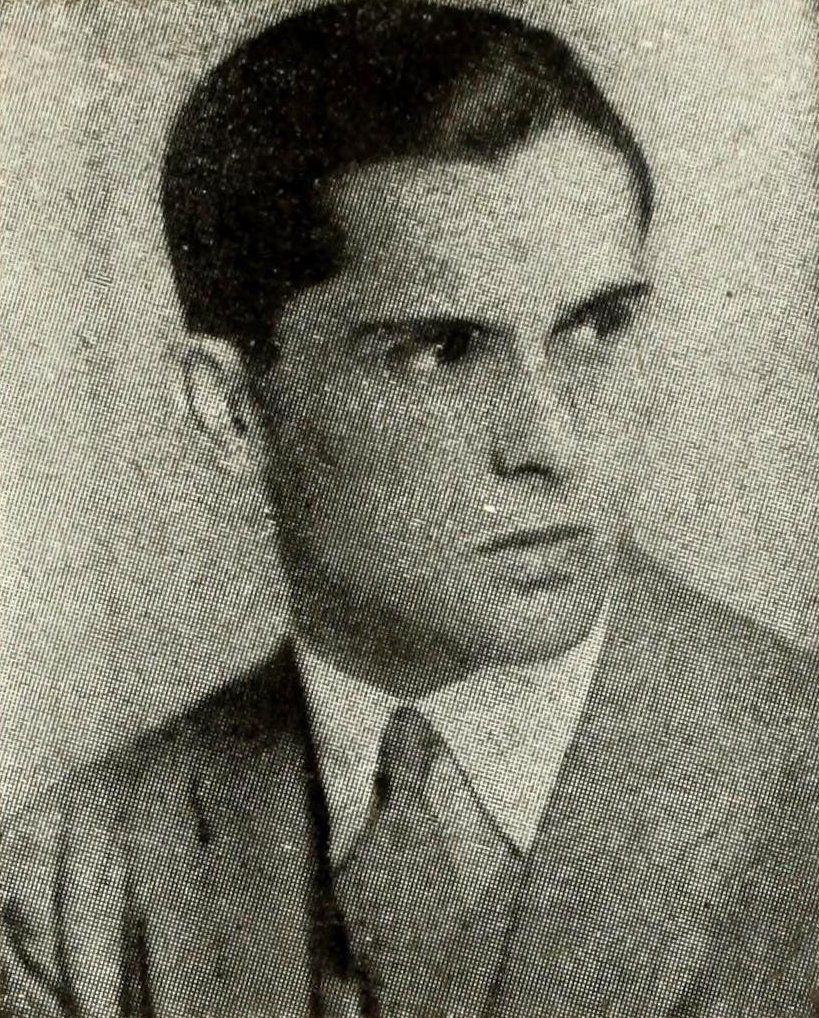
- Chomette in 1920.
- Born: 30 March 1896; Paris, France
- Died: 15 June 1941 (aged 45); Rabat, French Morocco
- Occupations: Actor, Writer, Director
- Years active: 1922–1938 (film)

Henri Chomette (1896–1941) was a French actor, screenwriter and film director. He was the brother of the film director René Clair.

== Selected filmography ==
- Roger la Honte (1922)
- À quoi rêvent les jeunes filles?
- Mademoiselle's Chauffeur (1928)
- Durand Versus Durand (1931)
- At the End of the World (1934)
- Donogoo (1936)

== Bibliography ==
- Jan-Christopher Horak. Lovers of Cinema: The First American Film Avant-garde, 1919–1945. Univ of Wisconsin Press, 1995.
