= Günther Stapenhorst =

German film producer

- Born: 25 June 1883; Gebweiler, Alsace-Lorraine, German Empire
- Died: 4 February 1976 (aged 92); Munich, West Germany
- Occupation: Film producer
- Years active: 1927–1960

Günther Stapenhorst (25 June 1883 – 4 February 1976) was a German film producer. He produced more than 50 films between 1927 and 1960. He was a member of the jury at the 12th Berlin International Film Festival.

== Selected filmography ==
- The Blue Mouse (1928)
- Yacht of the Seven Sins (1928)
- Because I Love You (1928)
- Her Dark Secret (1929)
- The Model from Montparnasse (1929)
- The Convict from Istanbul (1929)
- The Flute Concert of Sanssouci (1930)
- The Immortal Vagabond (1930)
- A Student's Song of Heidelberg (1930)
- Hocuspocus (1930)
- The Little Escapade (1931)
- Ronny (1931)
- Emil and the Detectives (1931)
- The Beautiful Adventure (1932)
- How Shall I Tell My Husband? (1932)
- Morgenrot (1933)
- Waltz War (1933)
- Refugees (1933)
- Court Waltzes (1933)
- Season in Cairo (1933)
- Night in May (1934)
- At the End of the World (1934)
- The Young Baron Neuhaus (1934)
- Amphitryon (1935)
- The Great Barrier (1937)
- Two Times Lotte (1950)
- The White Adventure (1952)
- The White Horse Inn (1952)
- Alraune (1952)
- Anna Louise and Anton (1953)
- The Last Waltz (1953)
- The Immortal Vagabond (1953)
- To Be Without Worries (1953)
- Cabaret (1954)
- Fruits of Summer (1955)
- Ballerina (1956)
- The Beggar Student (1956)
- Restless Night (1958)
