= David Welch (historian) =

- Occupation: Historian

Academic background
- Education: London School of Economics

Academic work
- Main interests: Political propaganda

David Welch is an academic historian specialising in the study of twentieth-century propaganda. He is Professor of Modern History and Director of the Centre for the Study of Propaganda and War at the University of Kent. He is the editor of Routledge's Sources in History series and has also written many articles for History Today.

== Biography ==
David Welch attained his doctorate at the London School of Economics. After several other appointments which he undertook, he became the Professor of Modern History under the University of Kent from 1992 onwards.

== Selected publications ==
- Propaganda and the German Cinema, 1933–1945 (1983, rev. ed. 2001)
- The Third Reich: Politics and Propaganda (1993, 2nd ed. 2002)
- Hitler: Profile of a Dictator (1998, 2nd ed. 2001)
- Germany, Propaganda and Total War 1914–18: The Sins of Omission (2000)
- Propaganda and Mass Persuasion: A Historical Encyclopedia, 1500 to the Present (2003, co-authored)
