= Walter Röhrig =

German art director

- Born: April 13, 1887; Berlin, German Empire
- Died: December 6, 1945 (aged 58); Caputh, Brandenburg, Germany
- Occupation: Art director
- Years active: 1919–1945 (film)

Walter Röhrig (13 April 1887 – 6 December 1945) was a German art director.

== Selected filmography ==
- The Cabinet of Dr. Caligari (1920)
- Masks (1920)
- Island of the Dead (1921)
- Destiny (1921)
- Parisian Women (1921)
- Miss Julie (1922)
- Kaddish (1924)
- Luther (1928)
- The Flute Concert of Sanssouci (1930)
- Hocuspocus (1930)
- The Immortal Vagabond (1930)
- Calais-Dover (1931)
- In the Employ of the Secret Service (1931)
- The Countess of Monte Cristo (1932)
- Congress Dances (1932)
- Waltz War (1933)
- Refugees (1933)
- Court Waltzes (1933)
- The Empress and I (1933)
- Season in Cairo (1933)
- Night in May (1934)
- The Young Baron Neuhaus (1934)
- The Csardas Princess (1934)
- The Royal Waltz (1935)
- Savoy Hotel 217 (1936)
- Under Blazing Heavens (1936)
- Diamonds (1937)
- My Son the Minister (1937)
- The Wedding Trip (1939)
- Rembrandt (1942)
- A Salzburg Comedy (1943)

== Bibliography ==
- Michael L. Stephens. Art Directors in Cinema: A Worldwide Biographical Dictionary. McFarland, 1998.
