= The Woman of My Dreams (1944 film) =

1944 film

- German: Die Frau meiner Träume
- Directed by: Georg Jacoby
- Written by: Georg Jacoby; Herbert Witt; Johann von Vásáry
- Starring: Marika Rökk; Wolfgang Lukschy; Walter Müller
- Cinematography: Konstantin Irmen-Tschet
- Edited by: Erich Kobler
- Music by: Franz Grothe
- Production company: UFA
- Distributed by: Deutsche Filmvertriebs
- Release date: 25 August 1944
- Running time: 93 minutes
- Country: Germany
- Language: German

The Woman of My Dreams (German: Die Frau meiner Träume) is a 1944 German musical comedy film directed by Georg Jacoby and starring Marika Rökk, Wolfgang Lukschy and Walter Müller.

The film's sets were designed by the art director Erich Kettelhut. It was shot at the Babelsberg and Tempelhof Studios in Berlin, using the Agfacolor process. It premiered at the Marmorhaus in August 1944.

== Cast ==
- Marika Rökk as Revuestar Julia Köster
- Wolfgang Lukschy as Senior Engineer Peter Groll
- Walter Müller as Ingenieur Erwin Forster
- Georg Alexander as Theaterdirektor
- Grethe Weiser as Jungfer Luise
- Inge Drexel as Dorfmädchen Resi
- Valentin Froman as Julia's dance partner
- Willy Schulte-Vogelheim as Julia's dance partner
- Egon Vogel as Reporter
- Erna Krüger as place up keeper in the Revuetheater
- Karin Lüsebrink as cashier des Revuetheaters
- Lotte Spira as canteen landlady
- Vera Witt as Julias Gardrobiere Mariechen
- Erwin Fichtner as Logengast mit Monokel
- Julius Brandt as sleeping passenger in the car compartment
- Karl Etlinger as Head waiter in the station restaurant
- Karl Hannemann as coat handler at the station
- Victor Janson as frequent customer
- Fritz Lafontaine as Theatre stage manager
- Gustav Püttjer as Sprengmeister bei Groll
- Connie Hansen as Platzanweiserin
- Hans Stiebner as train passenger
- Jakob Tiedtke as old man at the box office
- Herbert Weißbach as Schlafwagenkontrolleur
- Ewald Wenck as Bühnenportier
