= Erich Kettelhut =

German production designer

- Born: Erich Karl Heinrich Kettelhut; 1 November 1893; Berlin, German Empire
- Died: 13 March 1979 (aged 86); Hamburg, West Germany
- Occupations: Production designer Art director Set decorator
- Years active: 1919–1960
- Spouse: Aenne Willkomm

Erich Karl Heinrich Kettelhut (1 November 1893 – 13 March 1979) was a German production designer, art director and set decorator. Kettelhut is considered one of the most important artists in the history of early German cinema, mainly for his set direction for Die Nibelungen (1924) and his design and visual effects for Metropolis (1927). His early career was defined by a working relationship with fellow designers Otto Hunte and Karl Vollbrecht, the trio working on many of Fritz Lang's early German films. Despite being best known for his iconic visuals on several of the most important films of German Expressionist cinema, he is also noted for a career spanning into the 1960s and his work on more light-hearted films and musicals.

== Career ==
=== Early career ===
Kettelhut was born in Berlin in 1893. After leaving school, he received training at a craft school as a theatre artist. In 1909 he first met Otto Hunte, when they were placed in charge of art direction at the Aachen's Stadttheater. The two became long-time collaborators during their early cinema careers. From 1910 until 1912 Kettelhut studied at the College of Applied Arts in Berlin. This was followed by time spent as an apprentice in local theatres around Germany including a period as a scene painter at the Metropolitan Opera in Berlin and a role as the head of the design department in Mühlhausen. His role in theatre was interrupted when Kettelhut was called to serve at the Front in 1914. After being discharged at the end of the First World War his old colleagues, Hunte and Karl Vollbrecht, found Kettelhut employment at Martin Jacoby-Boy's design agency in Berlin. One of the firm's clients was MayFilms, the production company for film maker Joe May and was through these ties that Kettelhut first began his work within cinema.

=== Lang, Hunte and Vollbrecht, 1919–1926 ===
Kettelhut was first employed in cinema for May Film's 1919 production Die Herrin der Welt (The Mistress of the World), an eight-part epic of German cinema. Kettelhut was employed as a production designer on all eight parts and is also credited as a set decorator on the first part. It is on this film that he was re-united with Otto Hunte, to whom he worked as an assistant, and Karl Vollbrecht. Both of whom would work on many films with Kettelhut in the future. Also employed on The Mistress of the World, but as a writer, was Fritz Lang. Kettelhut worked as an assistant to Jacoby-Boy on two further pictures in 1920, the first being Das wandernde Bild (The Moving Image), in which Kettelhut was first introduced to Lang who was directing the film. After producing designs on both parts of 1921's The Indian Tomb, Kettelhut was hired to work on Lang's Dr. Mabuse the Gambler (1922), where he was reunited with Hunte and Vollbrecht.

Kettelhut's design work for the mechanical dragon from Die Nibelungen:Siegfried, showing his technical detail and cramped style.

In 1924, Kettelhut worked on one of his most important films, Die Nibelungen. With Lang again as director, he reassembled the team of Hunte, Vollbrecht and Kettelhut, charged with designing the mythical world of Siegfried and the Nibelungen. Hunte was placed in charge of set design and construction, while Kettelhut and Vollbrecht assisted as set collaborators, though Kettelhut's speciality was in architectural designs and models. Kettelhut not only created the architectural feel of the film, designing the buildings such as the Icelandic castle surrounded by fire from Part I, but he was also heavily involved in designing more mechanical elements, most notably the life-sized dragon slayed by Siegfried. Shortly before his death, Kettelhut was persuaded to sell his original production drawings from Die Nibelungen to the Deutsche Kinemathek, and subsequently they have been shown as part of exhibitions in the museum of cinema in Berlin and the Centre Georges Pompidou in France. Die Nibelungen brought Kettelhut into a working relationship with cameraman Günther Rittau. The two worked together several times in the future, but their most impressive collaboration was on their next Fritz Lang film, Metropolis (1927). Lang kept faith with his old team and with Hunte as lead, Vollbrecht and Kettelhut were brought in to design the cityscape central to the sci-fi dystopia of the film. Kettelhut's drawing's originally featured a large Gothic cathedral style building amongst the skyscrapers, but this was rejected by Lang who had visions of a city which had rejected religion and instead had built a 'Tower of Babel'. Rittau and Kettelhut worked closely, not only to realise Lang's vision, but also on early special effects to bring the enormity of the city to life. Kettelhut's is credited with the positions of Art Direction and Art Department on Metropolis, but also undertook several uncredited roles, including special effects, visual effects and technical consultant.

Hunte and Kettelhut's work during this period is often discussed as a shared output with the two men holding the same design ideology. When they were interviewed to discuss their creations, they would discuss the architectural or mechanical features of their design rather than the artistic. Unlike their contemporaries, Robert Herlth (Faust) and Walter Reimann (The Cabinet of Dr. Caligari), Hunte and Kettelhut preferred to approach a challenge by looking at the economic restrictions and technical difficulties to ensure they did not hit problems at construction. Herlth and Reimann were more concerned with the look and artistic design and encouraged on-set improvisation to overcome technical issues.

=== After Lang, 1927–1932 ===
After Metropolis, Kettelhut, Hunte and Vollbrecht went their own ways. This allowed Kettelhut to come to the fore as a designer, and from this point he was normally the lead designer in the films he worked on, mainly for UFA. One of Kettelhut's first solo projects was an uncredited role as art director for Walter Ruttmann's documentary Berlin: Die Sinfonie der Großstadt (Berlin: Symphony of a Metropolis). To maintain the integrity of the documentary, Kettelhut hid and sheltered the cameras around the city to allow them to capture the citizens of Berlin without interruption. In 1928 Kettelhut provided art direction for Paul Czinner's drama Doña Juana, and Ungarische Rhapsodie a romantic film starring a young Dita Parlo.

Until 1932, Kettelhut continued to work with producer Erich Pommer, who had overseen previous ventures such as Dr. Mabuse, the Gambler and Die Nibelungen. These included the 1929 silent melodrama Asphalt and a series of Lilian Harvey operettas (Princesse! à vos ordres!, The Love Waltz and Quick) and Hans Albers adventures (Asphalt, Bombs on Monte Carlo and F.P.1 antwortet nicht). Kettelhut's work on Asphalt, where he designed on set an entire street to allow long panning shots, harks to the work of Rochus Gliese, who achieved a similar feat on F. W. Murnau's Sunrise: A Song of Two Humans (1927). Kettelhut's Asphalt street was a fully functioning 760-foot-long set that allowed for ten camera positions and whose "day-lighting" of 2,000 lamps consumed the electrical supply comparable to a small city. The street design was originally given to Herlth, but he resigned after falling out with the director; but Herlth's original vision influenced Kettelhut's final design.

During this time, the early days of cinema sound, many studios experimented with Multiple Language Versions (MLVs), taking a story and crew and shooting a film in two or more languages usually with a completely new cast. UFA experimented with MLVs, shooting many of its films in German, French and English, and this resulted in Kettelhut being hired to work on two or three films in quick succession. Examples of this involving Kettelhut include: Bombs on Monte Carlo (German), Le capitaine Craddock (French) and Monte Carlo Madness (English). Of the films Kettelhut contributed during this period, of note from a design context, is 1932's F.P.1 antwortet nicht (also shot as I.F.1 ne répond plus (French version) and F.P.1 (English version)). This science-fiction film centered around a mid-Atlantic aircraft landing platform, which was designed by Kettelhut.

=== Work during Nazi Germany 1933–1945 ===
Kettelhut continued to find employment in Germany after the Nazis came to power. He found himself working with German directors such as Paul Martin, Reinhold Schünzel and Arthur Robison, producing mainly comedies for home-grown talent like Willy Fritsch. During this period Kettelhut was more often listed in his films as the production designer rather than art director. From 1937 he struck a strong professional relationship with director Georg Jacoby, and worked on a string of musicals with him, including Gasparone (1937), Der Vorhang fällt (1939), Kora Terry (1940) and Frauen sind doch bessere Diplomaten (1941). Frauen sind doch bessere Diplomaten (Women Are Better Diplomats) was a long shoot and went over budget, mainly due to problems with filming in the newly developed Agfacolor. With the end of the Second World War, Kettelhut left the film industry for five years. The release of Erich Engel's rom-com Fahrt ins Glück in 1948, for which Kettelhut worked as the production designer, was postponed. It was actually shot in 1944 but needed to wait four years until its premiere, in East Germany.

=== Later career 1946–1979 ===
Kettelhut returned to film in 1950, with the Carl Froelich comedy drama Drei Mädchen spinnen. He continued to work throughout Germany, being employed by studios in Munich, Hamburg and Berlin. Kettelhut at first found himself designing sets for films similar to those he had been working on during the 1940s, with another Georg Jacoby musical Sensation in San Remo (1951), starring Marika Rökk. He also teamed up with actor Gustav Fröhlich, on one of Fröhlich's few forays into directing, the drama Torreani. In 1954 he found work again with his former boss Erich Pommer who had returned from self-imposed exile in the United States. They made two final films together Eine Liebesgeschichte (1954) and Kinder, Mütter und ein General (Children, Mother, and the General) which became one of the five pictures selected as best foreign film at the 1955 Golden Globe Awards.

In the mid-1950s, Kettelhut found himself in constant demand, working on three or four films a year. In 1955, as well as Kinder, Mütter und ein General he also acted as production designer on Drei Mädels vom Rhein, Drei Tage Mittelarrest and Eine Frau genügt nicht?. In the late 1950s, Kettelhut contributed outstanding design sets to two submarine dramas, the sympathetic anti-war tale Haie und kleine Fische (Sharks and Little Fish) and the loose biographical film U 47 – Kapitänleutnant Prien. Kettelhut's final outing on the big screen saw him reunited with Fritz Lang, in what would also be the director's final film, The Thousand Eyes of Dr. Mabuse (1960).

With his career in film behind him, Kettelhut found work in the emerging television industry. He provided art direction for the television movies Geschichte einer Geschichte (1963) Das Feuerzeichen (1965) and Schwarzer Freitag (Black Friday) and the short lived 1963 television comedy series Die merkwürdigen Erlebnisse des Hansjürgen Weidlich. He died in Hamburg, West Germany on the 13 March 1979 at the age of 86.

== Awards and recognition ==
In 1968 Kettelhut was awarded the 'Special Award for Outstanding Contributions to German Cinema' for his lifelong body of work at the annual German Film Awards (Deutscher Filmpreis).

== Filmography ==
- 1919: Die Herrin der Welt (The Mistress of the World) (All eight parts)‡
- 1920: Das wandernde Bild (The Moving Image)^{A}
- 1920: Die Legende von der heiligen Simplicia^{A}
- 1920: Die Schuld der Lavinia Morland†
- 1921: Das indische Grabmal (The Indian Tomb) (uncredited - both parts)†
- 1922: Dr. Mabuse, der Spieler (Dr. Mabuse the Gambler)†
- 1923: Tragödie der Liebe (Tragedy of Love)†
- 1923: Der steinerne Reiter (The Stone Rider)^{S}
- 1924: Die Nibelungen (both parts)^{S}
- 1926: Metropolis†^{A}
- 1927: Berlin: Die Sinfonie der Großstadt (Berlin: Symphony of a Metropolis)†
- 1927: Out of the Mist †
- 1927: Dancing Vienna †
- 1928: Doña Juana†
- 1928: Hungarian Rhapsody '†
- 1929: Asphalt†
- 1929: Fräulein Else (Miss Else)†
- 1929: Melodie des Herzens (Melody of the Heart)†
- 1930: Waltz of Love†
- 1930: Liebling der Götter†
- 1930: Burglars†
- 1931: Ihre Majestät die Liebe†
- 1931: Caught in the Act†
- 1931: Her Grace Commands †
- 1931: Princess, At Your Orders!†
- 1931: Voruntersuchung (Inquest)†
- 1931: About an Inquest
- 1931: His Highness Love †
- 1931: Bombs on Monte Carlo †
- 1931: Son altesse l'amour (His Highness Love)†
- 1931: Le capitaine Craddock†
- 1932: Monte Carlo Madness†
- 1932: Happy Ever After†
- 1932: Un rêve blond‡
- 1932: Stürme der Leidenschaft†
- 1932: Tumultes†
- 1932: Quick†
- 1932: Quick†
- 1932: A Blonde Dream†
- 1932: Le vainqueur‡
- 1932: F.P.1 antwortet nicht‡
- 1932: I.F.1 ne répond plus‡
- 1932: F.P.1‡
- 1933: Kind, ich freu' mich auf Dein Kommen‡
- 1933: Happy Days in Aranjuez‡
- 1933: Young Dessau's Great Love‡
- 1934: Die Töchter ihrer Exzellenz‡
- 1934: The Girlfriend of a Big Man ‡
- 1934: Fürst Woronzeff‡
- 1934: Playing with Fire‡
- 1935: Schwarze Rosen (Black Roses)‡
- 1935: Fresh Wind from Canada‡
- 1936: Schlußakkord^{S}
- 1936: Glückskinder (Lucky Kids)‡
- 1937: Fanny Elssler †
- 1937: Gasparone‡
- 1938: Nanon†
- 1938: Fortsetzung folgt †
- 1939: Hallo Janine! (Hello Janine!)‡
- 1939: Der grüne Kaiser (The Green Emperor)‡
- 1939: Der Vorhang fällt (The Curtain Falls)‡
- 1940: Kora Terry‡
- 1941: Frauen sind doch bessere Diplomaten (Women Are Better Diplomats)†
- 1942: Diesel†
- 1942: Der 5. Juni‡
- 1943: Du gehörst zu mir†
- 1944: Das schwarze Schaf‡
- 1944: Die Frau meiner Träume (The Woman of My Dreams)†
- 1945: The Noltenius Brothers †
- 1948: Journey to Happiness‡
- 1950: Drei Mädchen spinnen (Three Girls Spinning)‡
- 1951: Sensation in San Remo‡
- 1951: Torreani‡
- 1951: Die Czardasfürstin (The Csardas Princess)‡
- 1952: Pension Schöller‡
- 1953: Mask in Blue‡
- 1953: Die Rose von Stambul (The Rose of Stamboul)‡
- 1953: Der Vetter aus Dingsda‡
- 1953: Red Roses, Red Lips, Red Wine†
- 1954: Eine Liebesgeschichte (A Love Story)‡
- 1954: Gefangene der Liebe (Prisoners of Love)‡
- 1955: Three Girls from the Rhine‡
- 1955: Kinder, Mütter und ein General (Children, Mother, and the General)‡
- 1955: Three Days Confined to Barracks‡
- 1956: Das Mädchen Marion†
- 1956: Nina
- 1957: Haie und kleine Fische (Sharks and Little Fish)†
- 1957: Von allen geliebt
- 1957: Made in Germany
- 1958: Gestehen Sie, Dr. Corda!‡
- 1958: U 47 – Kapitänleutnant Prien†
- 1959: Marili†
- 1959: Bobby Dodd greift ein‡
- 1959: Der Mann, der sich verkaufte (The Man Who Sold Himself)‡
- 1960: Storm in a Water Glass‡
- 1960: Until Money Departs You
- 1960: Die 1000 Augen des Dr. Mabuse (The 1000 Eyes of Dr. Mabuse)‡

Key: † As art director; ‡ As production designer; ^{S} As set decorator; ^{A} Art department
