= Peter Kreuder =

German-Austrian pianist, composer, and conductor. (1905–1981)

Peter Paul Kreuder (18 August 1905 – 28 June 1981) was a German-Austrian pianist, composer and conductor.

== Life ==
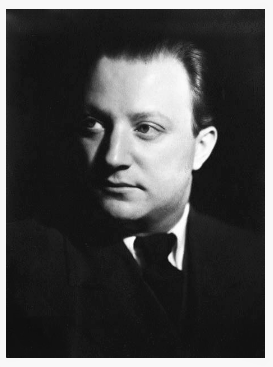
Peter Kreuder (1935), by Gregor Harlip

Kreuder was born in Aachen, the son of a Kammersänger. He enrolled as a piano student at the Cologne Conservatory in 1910, where he performed his first concert one year later, and at music academies in Munich, Berlin and Hamburg. After World War I he worked as a composer of musical performances at the Hamburg Kammerspiele theatre, at the Munich Staatstheater am Gärtnerplatz, as well as of several Kabarett and revue productions. In the meantime he continued his studies, taking his exams at the Munich Academy of Music in 1924.

In 1925 he was employed as Kapellmeister at the Deutsches Theater München, and conducted theatre ensembles, first in Munich and then in Berlin, where he worked with Max Reinhardt. In 1930 he met with Friedrich Hollaender, whom he assisted arranging the musical score of Josef von Sternberg's film The Blue Angel starring Marlene Dietrich. During the 1930s and 40s he became one of the most sought-after German musical film composers; his credits run to some 150 movies. Several songs, performed by stars like Zarah Leander or Marika Rökk, are popular and covered up to today.

Kreuder joined the Nazi Party in 1932, however, he resigned his membership in 1934. His compositions added to the intended development of a "German" light music genre as contrasted to the US big band style, though they contained a large deal of jazz and swing elements. He emigrated to Sweden in 1939, but returned to Germany two years later after threats against his relatives were launched by the Nazi authorities.

After World War II Kreuder adopted Austrian citizenship and conducted radio orchestras in Brazil and Argentina. In the second half of the 1950s, he was sometimes the pianist of Joséphine Baker. He died in Salzburg and is buried in Munich Ostfriedhof, grave number 55-19-2.

In addition to his film work, Kreuder also wrote popular songs and art pieces, including a piano concerto, operettas, musicals, and two operas, Der Zerissene (1940) and Der Postmeister (1966). He wrote two memoirs, Schön war die Zeit (1955) and Nur Puppen haben keine Tränen (1971).

== Filmography ==
- Cadets (1931)
- Peter Voss, Thief of Millions (1932)
- A Woman Like You (1933)
- Mazurka (1935)
- White Slaves (1936)
- Tomfoolery (1936)
- Court Theatre (1936)
- A Wedding Dream (1936)
- Capers (1937)
- Gasparone (1937)
- Woman's Love—Woman's Suffering (1937)
- Serenade (1937)
- Secret Mission (1938)
- The Muzzle (1938)
- Mystery About Beate (1938)
- Water for Canitoga (1939)
- Opera Ball (1939)
- Hello Janine! (1939)
- Nanette (1940)
- The Three Codonas (1940)
- The Singing House (1948)
- The Honourable Tenant (1951)
- I Can't Marry Them All (1952)
- Paradise (1953)
- Arlette Conquers Paris (1953)
- A Musical War of Love (1953)
- Hit Parade (1953)
- The Mosquito (1954)
- The First Kiss (1954)
- Her First Date (1955)
- Stolen Heaven (1974)
