= Wilhelm Hill =

German musician (1838–1902)

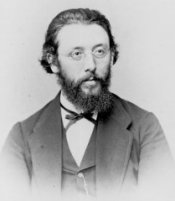
- Born: Johann Wilhelm Hill; 28 March 1838; Fulda, Hesse, Germany
- Died: 6 June 1902 (aged 64); Homburg, Saarland, Germany
- Occupations: Pianist and composer
- Spouse: Maria Möhring

Johann Wilhelm Hill (28 March 1838 – 6 June 1902) was a German pianist and composer.

== Life and work ==
Hill was born in Fulda. He began studying piano and violin with his father at 6 years old. He devoted himself tirelessly to composing at age 14. From May 1854 Hill lived in Frankfurt am Main, where he was pupil of Heinrich Henkel and Johann Christian Hauff. He gave his first public piano performance in Fulda the following year, and performed in Frankfurt in January 1858.

In the 1880s, Hill taught at Lindner Institute and Julius Stockhausen's Vocal School. His opera Alona was awarded second prize in the competition for the opening of the new Frankfurt Opera House in 1882. He married Maria (Mary) Möhring in 1887 and soon after contracted an eye disease which affected his ability to teach and compose.

He composed two operas, a piano concerto, chamber music, piano compositions, choral and vocal works including numerous songs. Hill gained popularity through the song "Das Herz am Rhein" ("The Heart of the Rhine"; published in 1866), which was sung frequently by his friend, baritone Karl Hill. The song soon appeared in various vocal and instrumental arrangements and became standard repertoire for vocalists and musicians of the time.

Hill died in Homburg, Saarland. He and his wife are buried in Frankfurt Hauptfriedhof.

== Selected works ==
=== Opera ===
- Alona, Romantic Opera in 3 acts (1882); libretto by Otto Prechtler
- Jolanthe; based on King René's Daughter by Henrik Hertz

=== Concertante ===
- Concerto in C♯ minor for piano and orchestra

=== Chamber music ===
- Piano Trio No. 1 in D major, Op. 12 (1863)
- Notturno, Scherzo und Romanze for viola and piano, Op. 18 (1868)
- Sonata in E minor for violin and piano, Op. 20 (1878)
- 2 Romanzen for viola or cello and piano, Op. 22 (1869)
- 2 Sonatinas for violin and piano, Op. 28 (1871)

1. in B minor

- Piano Trio No. 2 in G major, Op. 43 (1878)
- Piano Quartet in E♭ major, Op. 44 (1879)
- String Quartet in D major, Op. 45 (published 1915)

=== Piano ===
- Grande valse brilliante in E♭ major, Op. 4 (1864)
- 2 Klavierstücke, Op. 7 (1864)

1. Impromptu
2. Saltarello

- Große Polonaise in C♯ minor, Op. 9 (1863)
- Valse-Caprice (1868)
- Romanze und Scherzo, Op. 15 (1870)
- 6 Etüden, Op. 16 (1869)
- 3 Sonatinen (progreßiv), Op. 27 (1871)

1. in G Major
2. in F Major
3. in C Major

- Jugenderinnerungen (Youth Memories) for piano 4-hands, Op. 31 (1872)

1. Zum Eingang
2. Guter Laune
3. Frisch durch
4. Beim Feste
5. Walzer
6. Der Spielmann

- 6 Characterstücke, Op. 32 (1872)

1. Romanze
2. Pastorale
3. Menuett
4. Jagdstück
5. Impromptu
6. Trauermarsch

- 4 Albumblätter, Op. 33 (1872)
- Impromptu-Valse, Op. 34 (1872)
- Polonaise, Op. 35 (1874)
- Rondo capriccioso, Op. 36 (1874)
- Gavotte in F♯ minor, Op. 47 (1888)
- Idyllen: Tonbilder aus dem Taunus, Op. 48 (1890)

1. Morgenwanderung
2. Unter Rosen
3. Die Mühle
4. In der alten Burg
5. Am Brunhildisfelsen
6. Kleines Intermezzo
7. Zigeuner am Wege
8. Bei Sonnenuntergang

- Tarantella for piano 4-hands, Op. 50 (1892)
- Capriccio in B major, Op. 52 (1896)
- 2 Intermezzi, Op. 53 (1896)

1. Alla Mazur in D♭ major
2. Intermezzo in B♭ major

- Introduction und Allegro appassionato, Op. 54 (1896)
- Präludium und Fuge, Op. 55 (1899)
- Gavotte mignonne, Op. 59

=== Choral ===
- Hurrah, Germania! for 4-part male chorus a cappella (1870)
- 6 Gesänge for 4-part male chorus a cappella, Op. 56 (1899)

1. Die Grafen von Zollem: „Im Schwabenlande erhebt sich ein Schloß“
2. Die Frauen vom Rhein: „Die Frauen in Deutschland sind minnig fürwahr“
3. Abendsang: „Nun hängt das Schwert bei Seite“
4. Maigruß: „Im Morgenrot die Berge glüh'n“
5. Mosellied: „Weiß ein Fräulein eigner Art“
6. „Als ich dich sah zum ersten Mal“

- Horch, die Vesperhymne klingt: „Horch, wie über's Wasser hallend“ for male chorus a cappella, Op. 60 (1900)

=== Vocal ===
- Vergißmeinnicht for voice and piano (1959)
- 6 Lieder for voice and piano, Op. 3 (1860)

1. Werden wir wieder zusammenstehn
2. Fern und nah
3. Du bist wie eine Blume; words by Heinrich Heine
4. O Hoffnung, süße Himmelsmelodie
5. Klinge, süßer Liebesschall
6. Die Sonn' ist längst zur Ruh' gegangen

- 3 Lieder for voice and piano, Op. 10 (1865)

1. Walburgis
2. In des Waldes Einsamkeit
3. Du Blümlein welk

- 2 Balladen for alto (or baritone) and piano, Op. 11 (1866)

1. Mondwanderung; words by Robert Reinick
2. Des Knaben Tod; words by Ludwig Uhland

- Das Herz am Rhein (The Maid of the Rhine) for voice and piano (1866); words by Heinrich Dippel
- Das Mädchen von Kola: „Mädchen von Kola, du schläfst“ for voice and piano, Op. 13 (1867)
- 2 Lieder for soprano (or tenor) and piano, Op. 14 (1867); words by Emanuel Geibel

1. „Die stille Wasserrose“
2. Nach Norden: „Vöglein, wohin so schnell?“

- 4 Gesänge for alto (or baritone) and piano, Op. 17 (1870)

1. Curiose Geschichte
2. Die Nacht ist klar
3. Der Eichwald
4. Nachtlied

- 6 Lieder im Volkston for 2 voices and piano, Op. 19 (1869)

1. Am Bache
2. Guten Abend lieber Mondenschein
3. Im tiefen Wald verborgen
4. Der Lenz ist angekommen
5. Es war ein alter König; words by Heinrich Heine
6. Grüße

- Des Sängers Abschied for voice and piano, Op. 21 (1869)
- Thränen, Song Cycle for alto (or baritone) and piano, Op. 23 (1870); words by Adelbert von Chamisso

1. Was ist's, o Vater!
2. Ich habe, bevor der Morgen
3. Nicht der Thau und nicht der Regen
4. Denke, denke, mein Geliebter
5. Ich hab' ihn im Schalfe zu sehen gemeint
6. Wie so bleich ich geworden bin

- 6 Gesänge for voice and piano, Op. 26 (1870)

1. Abend im Walde
2. Neig', schöne Knospe; words by Friedrich von Bodenstedt after Mirza Shafi Vazeh
3. Suleika; words by Friedrich von Bodenstedt after Mirza Shafi Vazeh
4. Mein Herz schmückt sich mit dir; words by Friedrich von Bodenstedt after Mirza Shafi Vazeh
5. Liebesklange
6. Gefunden; words by Johann Wolfgang von Goethe

- „O lieb, so lang du lieben kannst“ for baritone (or alto) and piano (1871); words by Ferdinand Freiligrath
- Schwäbisches Liebesliedchen: „Sag', gold'ger Schatz“ for voice and piano (1871)
- Der Äsra: „Täglich ging die schöne Sultanstochter“ for voice and piano, Op. 29 (1872); words from a poem, Der Asra, by Heinrich Heine
- 6 Gesänge for medium voice and piano, Op. 37 (1874)

1. Stille Sicherheit: „Horch wie still es wird“; words by Nikolaus Lenau
2. „Flohen die Wolken im Abendwind“
3. Im Frühling: „Wenn der Apfelbaum blüht“; words by Friedrich von Bodenstedt
4. „Unter den Zweigen“; words by Paul Heyse
5. Klage eines Mädchens: „O Blätter, dürre Blätter“; words by Ludwig Pfau
6. „Es war im Dorfe Hochzeit“; words by Friedrich von Bodenstedt

- 4 Duetten for 2 female voices and piano, Op. 38 (1874)

1. Nächtlich: „Der Mond umfluthet und umflicht“; words by Ernst, Baron von Feuchtersleben
2. Da Drüben: „Da drüben überm Walde“; words by Julius Mosen
3. Herbstlied: „Der Himmel ist grau umzogen“; words by Friedrich von Bodenstedt
4. Juchhe!: „Wie ist doch die Erde so schön“; words by Robert Reinick

- 2 ländliche Lieder for voice and piano, Op. 39 (1878); words by Emanuel Geibel

1. Frühling: „Und wenn die Primel schneeweiß blickt“
2. Winter: „Nun weht auf der Haide“

- 5 Lieder for voice and piano, Op. 40 (1878)

1. „Mir träumte einst ein schöner Traum“; words by Friedrich von Bodenstedt
2. Schlaflied: „Schlaf ein, mein Kind“
3. „Ich singe dich, liebliches Mädchen, du“
4. Ein Tanz im Gebirge: „Juchhe! so schallt's den Berg hinauf“
5. „Alles aufersteht uns wieder“

- 6 Lieder for voice and piano, Op. 41 (1878)

1. „Dem Bache entlang“
2. „Oft sinn' ich hin und wieder“
3. „Mein Herz thu' dich auf“
4. Ständchen: „Komm in die stille Nacht“
5. Neuer Frühling: „Neuer Frühling ist gekommen“
6. „Treibt der Sommer seinen Rosen“; words by Karl Wilhelm Osterwald

- 2 Mosellieder for voice and piano, Op. 58 (1899)

1. Moselweinlied: „Vom Rhein hin bis zum heil'gen Trier“
2. Moselweintrinklied: „Ich hab' getrunken manchen Wein“

- 4 Lieder for voice and piano, Op. 61 (1900)

1. „Es ist ein Schnee gefallen“
2. „Zum grünen Hain im Abendschein“
3. Der Leuchtkäfer: „Bei Tage, als im Sonnenlicht“
4. „So fern ist des Liebsten ruhmvolles Grab“

- Mein Moselland: „Du meine Wiege, o Moselland“ for voice and piano, Op. 62 (1899)
- Herzenstausch: „Du sagst, mein liebes Mütterlein“ for voice and piano (1900)
- 6 Gedichte for voice and piano, Op. 65 (1900)

1. Liebe: „Was ist das nur in meiner Brust“
2. „Verschließ, was dich bewegt“
3. Gefunden: „Wie lange ich gesucht dich hab'“
4. So geht's: „Du gabst mir einmal eine Rose“
5. Was ich liebe?: „Ein stets blauer Himmel wäre nicht schön“
6. Still!: „Still, still! Wein' nicht so heiß“

== Bibliography ==
- Karl Schmidt: Wilhelm Hill, Leben und Werke, Leipzig, Breitkopf & Härtel, 1910.
