= Burglars (film) =

1930 film

- Directed by: Hanns Schwarz
- Written by: Robert Liebmann; Louis Verneuil (play)
- Produced by: Erich Pommer
- Starring: Lilian Harvey; Willy Fritsch; Heinz Rühmann
- Cinematography: Konstantin Irmen-Tschet; Günther Rittau
- Edited by: Willy Zeyn
- Music by: Friedrich Hollaender; Franz Waxman
- Production company: UFA
- Distributed by: UFA
- Release date: 16 December 1930
- Running time: 102 minutes
- Country: Germany
- Language: German

Burglars (German: Einbrecher) is a 1930 German musical comedy film directed by Hanns Schwarz and starring Ralph Arthur Roberts, Lilian Harvey, Willy Fritsch, and Heinz Rühmann. It is also known in English by the alternative title Murder For Sale. It is based on the French play "Guignol le cambrioleur" by Louis Verneuil, who co-wrote the screenplay. A French-language version, titled Flagrant délit (Caught in the Act), was filmed at the same time. The film was intended by the studio UFA as a follow-up to the hit musical The Three from the Filling Station.

The film's set were designed by the art director Erich Kettelhut. It was shot at the Babelsberg Studios in Berlin with location filming also taking place in Paris.

== Plot ==
A young wife married to a much older toymaker is seduced by a dashing young thief who plans to rob them.

== Cast ==
- Ralph Arthur Roberts as Dumontier
- Lilian Harvey as Reneé
- Willy Fritsch as Durand
- Heinz Rühmann as Sérigny
- Margarethe Koeppke as Mimi
- Oskar Sima as Der Diener
- Gertrud Wolle as Hortense
- Kurt Gerron as 1. Polizeikommisar
- Paul Henckels as 2. Polizeikommisar
