= Willkomm =

Willkomm is a surname. Notable people with the surname include:

- Aenne Willkomm (1902–1979), later Aenne Kettelhut, German costume designer
- Heinrich Moritz Willkomm (1821–1895), German academic and botanist
- Katharina Willkomm (Katharina Kloke, born 1987), German lawyer and politician
