= Hello Janine! =

1939 film by Carl Boese

- German: Hallo Janine!
- Directed by: Carl Boese
- Written by: Hans Fritz Beckmann; K.G. Külb
- Produced by: Dietrich von Theobald
- Starring: Marika Rökk; Johannes Heesters; Rudi Godden
- Cinematography: Konstantin Irmen-Tschet
- Edited by: Milo Harbich
- Music by: Peter Kreuder
- Production company: UFA
- Distributed by: UFA
- Release date: July 1, 1939 (Germany)
- Running time: 93 minutes
- Country: Nazi Germany
- Language: German

Hello Janine! (German: Hallo Janine!) is a 1939 German musical film directed by Carl Boese and starring Marika Rökk, Johannes Heesters and Rudi Godden. It was shot at the Babelsberg Studios in Potsdam. The film's sets were designed by the art directors Ernst H. Albrecht and Erich Kettelhut. Along with Der Bettelstudent (1936) and Gasparone (1937) it helped establish Rökk as a major star, an effective replacement for La Jana. After the Second World War it was rereleased by Gloria Film.

== Cast ==
- Marika Rökk as Janine
- Johannes Heesters as Count Rene
- Rudi Godden as Pierre Tarin
- Mady Rahl as Bibi
- Else Elster as Yvette
- Erich Ponto as Monsieur Pamion
- Kate Kühl as Madame Pamion
- Hubert von Meyerinck as Jean
- Ernst Dumcke as The Director
- Edith Meinhard as Charlotte
- Marjan Lex as Bourboule
- Marlise Ludwig as The Hostess

== Bibliography ==
- Bock, Hans-Michael; Bergfelder, Tim, eds. (2009). The Concise Cinegraph: Encyclopaedia of German Cinema. Berghahn Books. ISBN 978-1-57181-655-9.
- Fox, Jo (2000). Filming Women in the Third Reich. Berg. ISBN 978-1-85973-396-7.
