= Konstantin Irmen-Tschet =

Russian-born German cinematographer

- Born: 24 June 1902; Moscow, Russian Empire
- Died: 27 May 1977 (aged 74); Munich, Bavaria; West Germany
- Other names: Konstantin Cetverikov; Konstantin Tschet
- Occupation: Cinematographer
- Years active: 1925–1968

Konstantin Irmen-Tschet (24 June 1902 – 27 May 1977) was a Russian-born German cinematographer. Irmen-Tschet was a leading technician of German films from the silent era to well into the post-Second World War years. He also often worked in Switzerland.

Irmen-Tschet emigrated to Germany following the Russian Revolution, and worked at first in the theatre. From 1925 he was employed as a cameraman in the large German film industry. In these early years he was known for his skill for filming special effects, and was employed on Fritz Lang's Metropolis (1927) and Woman in the Moon (1929) for this purpose. During the Nazi era, he shot a number of Lilian Harvey films, Marika Rökk musicals as well as the epic Münchhausen (1943).

He was married to the actress Brigitte Horney between 1940 and 1954.

== Selected filmography ==
- Metropolis (1927)
- Woman in the Moon (1929)
- Waltz of Love (1930)
- The Love Waltz (1930)
- Darling of the Gods (1930)
- Burglars (1930)
- Her Grace Commands (1931)
- Captain Craddock (1931)
- Princess, At Your Orders! (1931)
- Inquest (1931)
- The Man in Search of His Murderer (1931)
- Bombs on Monte Carlo (1931)
- About an Inquest (1931)
- Caught in the Act (1931)
- A Shot at Dawn (1932)
- A Blonde Dream (1932)
- Happy Ever After (1932)
- A Mad Idea (1932)
- The Cheeky Devil (1932)
- You Will Be My Wife (1932)
- Victor and Victoria (1933)
- Love Must Be Understood (1933)
- Hitlerjunge Quex (1933)
- Decoy (1934)
- George and Georgette (1934)
- The Island (1934)
- Enjoy Yourselves (1934)
- The Decoy (1935)
- The Royal Waltz (1935)
- The Last Four on Santa Cruz (1936)
- Boccaccio (1936)
- Women's Regiment (1936)
- Men Without a Fatherland (1937)
- Seven Slaps (1937)
- Gasparone (1937)
- Fanny Elssler (1937)
- Nanon (1938)
- Castles in the Air (1939)
- Hello Janine! (1939)
- The Governor (1939)
- Kora Terry (1940)
- Women Are Better Diplomats (1941)
- Münchhausen (1943)
- The Wedding Hotel (1944)
- After the Storm (1948)
- The Blue Straw Hat (1949)
- The Man Who Wanted to Live Twice (1950)
- Everything for the Company (1950)
- A Heidelberg Romance (1951)
- Immortal Light (1951)
- Palace Hotel (1952)
- We're Dancing on the Rainbow (1952)
- That Can Happen to Anyone (1952)
- The Divorcée (1953)
- Dreaming Lips (1953)
- Salto Mortale (1953)
- Walking Back into the Past (1954)
- Der 10. Mai (1957)
- The Cheese Factory in the Hamlet (1958)
- Jakobli and Meyeli (1962)

== Bibliography ==
- Kreimeier, Klaus. The Ufa Story: A History of Germany's Greatest Film Company, 1918-1945. University of California Press, 1999.
