= Darling of the Gods =

1930 film

- German film poster
- German: Liebling der Götter
- Directed by: Hanns Schwarz
- Written by: Hans Müller (play); Robert Liebmann; Richard Rillo
- Produced by: Erich Pommer
- Starring: Emil Jannings; Renate Müller; Olga Chekhova; Hans Moser
- Cinematography: Konstantin Irmen-Tschet; Günther Rittau
- Edited by: Willy Zeyn
- Music by: Willy Schmidt-Gentner
- Production company: Universum Film AG
- Distributed by: Universum Film AG
- Release date: 13 October 1930
- Running time: 112 minutes
- Country: Germany
- Language: German

Darling of the Gods (German: Liebling der Götter) is a 1930 German musical drama film directed by Hanns Schwarz and starring Emil Jannings, Renate Müller and Olga Chekhova. Jannings had recently returned from Hollywood where the arrival of sound films had harmed his career. The film was made at the Babelsburg studios, and based on the play Die Tokaier by Hans Müller. It was made by Erich Pommer's production unit, part of the German Major film studio UFA. It premiered at the Gloria-Palast in Berlin on 13 October 1930.

== Plot ==
Darling of the Gods (1930)

A selfish opera singer leaves his wife and home in Germany to travel the world's great cities. Eventually he is drawn back to his Bavarian homeland.

== Cast ==
- Emil Jannings as Albert Winkelmann
- Renate Müller as Agathe
- Olga Chekhova as Olga von Dagomirska
- Hans Moser as Kratochvil
- Max Gülstorff as The Medizinalrat
- Eduard von Winterstein as Dr. Marberg
- Willy Prager as Maurus Colwyn
- Siegfried Berisch as Romanones
- Vladimir Sokoloff as Boris Jussupoff
- Evaristo Signorini as Filipo Cardagno
- Oskar Sima as Member of the Embellishment Company
- Truus Van Aalten
- Ethel Reese-Burns
- Betty Bird
- Lilian Ellerbusch
- Betty Gast
- Lydia Pollman
- Valentine Wischnewskaja
- Fritz Alberti
- Luigi Bernauer
- Fritz Greiner
- Fritz Spira
- Marcel Wittrisch
