= Karl Georg Külb =

- Born: 28 January 1901; Mainz, German Empire
- Died: 20 July 1980 (aged 79); Munich, West Germany
- Occupations: Film director and screenwriter
- Years active: 1937–1963

Karl Georg Külb (1901–1980) was a German screenwriter and film director.

== Selected filmography ==
Screenwriter

- My Son the Minister (1937)
- The Blue Fox (1938)
- The Girl of Last Night (1938)
- Hello Janine! (1939)
- Der Stammbaum des Dr. Pistorius (1939)
- Women Are Better Diplomats (1941)
- With the Eyes of a Woman (1942)
- Love Letters (1944)
- Don't Play with Love (1949)
- Twelve Hearts for Charly (1949)
- Long Is the Road (1949)
- Sensation in Savoy (1950)
- Desire (1951)
- Marriage for One Night (1953)
- Tante Jutta aus Kalkutta (1953)
- Sun Over the Adriatic (1954)
- Conny and Peter Make Music (1960)

== Bibliography ==
- Shandley, Robert R. Rubble Films: German Cinema in the Shadow of the Third Reich. Temple University Press, 2001.
