= A Parisian in Rome =

- Directed by: Erich Kobler
- Written by: Oreste Biancoli; Ettore Scola; Ákos Tolnay
- Produced by: Ferruccio Biancini
- Starring: Barbara Laage; Alberto Sordi; Anna Maria Ferrero
- Cinematography: Francesco Izzarelli; Eugen Schüfftan
- Edited by: Gertrud Hinz-Nischwitz; Mario Serandrei
- Music by: Franz Grothe; Luigi Malatesta
- Production companies: Copa-Film; Rivo Film
- Distributed by: Zeus Film; Columbia Film-Verleih
- Release date: 11 November 1954
- Running time: 94 minutes
- Countries: Italy; West Germany
- Language: Italian

A Parisian in Rome (Italian: Una parigina a Roma, German: Begegnung in Rom) is a 1954 Italian-German comedy film directed by Erich Kobler and starring Barbara Laage, Alberto Sordi and Anna Maria Ferrero.

The film's sets were designed by the art director Ottavio Scotti.

== Cast ==
- Barbara Laage as Germaine, la Parigina
- Alberto Sordi as Alberto Lucetti
- Anna Maria Ferrero as Fiorella
- Erwin Strahl as Riccardo / Richard Koster
- Paul Hörbiger as Professor Roth
- Marcello Giorda as Sandi, padre di Fiorella
- Mino Doro as Maestro Manardi
- Uta Franz as Cicci, un'amica di Fiorella
- John Stacy as Maestro Brovin
- Edmondo Corsi as Franco, amico di Fiorella
- Giulio Bars as Sculptore Petroff
- Marisa Castellani as Silvana
- Ileana Lauro as Germaine's Maid
- Gina Mascetti as Fiorella's Maid
- Rio Nobile as Orti di Tiberio
- Franco Jamonte as Un amico di Fiorella
- Gabriella Scodino as Altra amica di Fiorella

== Bibliography ==
- Claudio G. Fava. Alberto Sordi. Gremese Editore, 2003.
