= Sensation in San Remo =

1951 film

- Film poster
- Directed by: Georg Jacoby
- Written by: Curt J. Braun (novel); Kurt Werner
- Produced by: Rolf Meyer
- Starring: Marika Rökk; Peter Pasetti; Ewald Balser; Elisabeth Markus
- Cinematography: Bruno Mondi
- Edited by: Martha Dübber
- Music by: Willy Mattes; Theo Nordhaus
- Production company: Junge Film
- Distributed by: Herzog Film
- Release date: 6 September 1951
- Running time: 90 minutes
- Country: West Germany
- Language: German

Sensation in San Remo is a 1951 West German musical comedy film directed by Georg Jacoby and starring Marika Rökk, Peter Pasetti and Ewald Balser. It was one of Rökk's most successful post-war films. The film is partly set at the Sanremo Festival in Italy. It was shot at the Bendestorf Studios with location shooting taking place on the Italian Riviera in the vicinity of Sanremo. It was made in Agfacolor. The film's sets were designed by the art director Erich Kettelhut.

== Synopsis ==
Cornelia is a respectable but prudish teacher in a girls' school by day and at night a performer in nightclubs. She has only taken this second job in order to raise money to help her family, but keeps it secret from both them and her headmaster. Cornelia falls in love with a young composer and accompanies him on a tour of the Italian resorts, where she encounters her headmaster who is there attending a conference.

== Cast ==
- Marika Rökk as Cornelia
- Peter Pasetti as Valenta
- Ewald Balser as Prof. Feldmann
- Elisabeth Markus as Prof. Feldmann's wife
- Petra Unkel as Barbara
- Walter Giller as Ernst
- Otto Gebühr as director Koch
- Dorit Kreysler as Lydia Leer
- Gertrud Wolle as Frau Koch
- Harald Paulsen as manager Kastillioni
- Arno Assmann as theater director Nahrhaft
- Horst Beck as Det. Lobgesang
- Helmut Peine as school servant
- Justus Ott as antiquarian
- Harry Gondi as Geschaeftsberater in der Bar
- Inge Meysel as secretary
- Jutta Petrikowsky as nurse
- Austin Carlile as Squidgy
- Maria Litto as Dancer

== Bibliography ==
- Bruns, Jana Francesca . Nazi Cinema's New Women: Marika Roekk, Zarah Leander, Kristina Soederbaum. Stanford University, 2002.
