= Erich Kobler =

German film editor and director

- Occupations: Editor; Director
- Years active: 1934-1963

Erich Kobler was a German film editor and director. Kobler directed the 1949 comedy Trouble Backstairs, He also directed Snow White and the Seven Dwarfs (1955).

== Selected filmography ==
=== Editor ===
- A Day Will Come (1934)
- The Court Concert (1936)
- Women for Golden Hill (1938)
- The Curtain Falls (1939)
- Kora Terry (1940)
- Women Are Better Diplomats (1941)
- Attack on Baku (1942)
- Germanin (1943)

=== Director ===
- Trouble Backstairs (1949)
- After the Rain Comes Sunshine (1949)
- Scandal at the Girls' School (1953)
- A Parisian in Rome (1954)
- Snow White and Red Rose (1955)
- Snow White and the Seven Dwarfs (1955)
- Rübezahl (1957)

== Bibliography ==
- Goble, Alan. The Complete Index to Literary Sources in Film. Walter de Gruyter, 1999.
