= Tante Jutta aus Kalkutta =

1953 film

- Directed by: Karl Georg Külb
- Written by: Max Reimann (play); Otto Schwartz (play); Karl Georg Külb
- Produced by: Jochen Genzow; Rudolf Wischert
- Starring: Viktor Staal; Ida Wüst; Ingrid Lutz
- Cinematography: Ernst W. Kalinke
- Edited by: Walter Fredersdorf
- Music by: Peter Igelhoff
- Production company: Ariston Film
- Distributed by: Neue Filmverleih
- Release date: 24 July 1953
- Running time: 80 minutes
- Country: West Germany
- Language: German

Tante Jutta aus Kalkutta ("Aunt Jutta from Calcutta") is a 1953 West German comedy film adapted from the play of the same name. It was directed by Karl Georg Külb and starred Viktor Staal, Ida Wüst, and Ingrid Lutz.

Th film was made in Munich and its sets designed by the Norwegian art director Arne Flekstad.

Släkten är värst (Unfriendly Relations), a 1936 Swedish comedy film, was also based on the same play.

== Synopsis ==
A city-dwelling bachelor lawyer invents a family to get financial support from his wealthy aunt. Complications arise when his aunt unexpected visits the city.

== Cast ==
- Viktor Staal as Dr. Hans Hannemann, Rechtsanwalt / Lawyer
- Ida Wüst as Tante Jutta
- Ingrid Lutz as Lilo
- Gunther Philipp as Emil Brückner
- Paul Westermeier as Bollerkopp
- Bum Krüger as Ferdinand, Diener
- Lucie Englisch as Lenchen
- Dorit Kreysler as Baby
- Gustav Waldau as Sanitätsrat Mummelmann
- Fritz Lafontaine as Intendant
- Waldemar Frahm as Amtsgerichtsrat
- Alexander Ponto as Amtsanwalt
- Walter Wehner as Gerichtsschreiber
- Emiljosef Hunek as Gerichtsdiener
- Franz Mehlers
- Irene Fischer as Verkäuferin
- Werner R. Heymann as Inspizient
- Gustav Molander as Indisch gekleideter Herr

== Bibliography ==
- Fritsche, Maria (2013). Homemade Men in Postwar Austrian Cinema: Nationhood, Genre and Masculinity. New York: Berghahn Books. ISBN 978-0-85745-946-6.
