= The Grey Lady (film) =

1937 German mystery film

- German: Die graue Dame
- Directed by: Erich Engels
- Written by: Erich Engels; Hans Heuer; Müller-Puzika (play)
- Starring: Hermann Speelmans; Trude Marlen; Elisabeth Wendt
- Cinematography: Edgar S. Ziesemer
- Music by: Werner Bochmann
- Production company: Neue Film Erich Engels
- Distributed by: Terra Film
- Release date: 26 February 1937
- Running time: 92 minutes
- Country: Germany
- Language: German

The Grey Lady, also known as Sherlock Holmes (German: Die graue Dame), is a 1937 German mystery film directed by Erich Engels and starring Hermann Speelmans, Trude Marlen and Elisabeth Wendt.

== Cast ==
- Hermann Speelmans as Jimmy Ward (Sherlock Holmes)
- Trude Marlen as Maria Iretzkaja
- Elisabeth Wendt as Lola
- Edwin Jürgensen as J.v. Barnov
- Theo Shall as Harry Morrel
- Ernst Karchow as Inspector Brown
- Werner Finck as John, Diener bei Ward
- Werner Scharf as Jack Clark
- Hans Halden as James Hewitt
- Henry Lorenzen as Archibald Pepperkorn
- Reinhold Bernt as Wilson
- Eva Tinschmann as Frau Miller
- Ursula Herking
- Maria Loja
- Charles Willy Kayser
- Paul Schwed
- Siegfried Weiß as Ganove
