= Bachelor's Paradise (1939 film) =

1939 film

- Directed by: Kurt Hoffmann
- Written by: Johannes Boldt (novel); Karl Peter Gillmann; Günter Neumann
- Produced by: Heinz Rühmann
- Starring: Heinz Rühmann; Josef Sieber; Hans Brausewetter; Trude Marlen
- Cinematography: Carl Drews
- Edited by: Arnfried Heyne
- Music by: Michael Jary
- Production company: Terra Film
- Distributed by: Terra Film
- Release date: 1 August 1939
- Running time: 91 minutes
- Country: Germany
- Language: German

Bachelors' Paradise (German: Paradies der Junggesellen) is a 1939 German comedy film directed by Kurt Hoffmann and starring Heinz Rühmann, Josef Sieber, and Hans Brausewetter. It was based on a novel by Johannes Boldt. It was shot at the Babelsberg Studios in Berlin with sets designed by the art director Willi Herrmann. The film featured the popular song "Das kann doch einen Seemann nicht erschüttern".

== Synopsis ==
After getting his second divorce, Hugo Bartels and his two ex-military comrades agree a pact to form a "paradise for bachelors" club in which all are pledged never to get married again. However, when Hugo meets and falls in love with an attractive woman, he faces a quandary. He is eventually able to marry her after introducing his friends to his two ex-wives and making sure they fall in love as well.

== Cast ==
- Heinz Rühmann as Hugo Bartels, Standesbeamter
- Josef Sieber as Caesar Spreckelsen, Apotheker
- Hans Brausewetter as Dr. Balduin Hannemann, Studienrat
- Trude Marlen as Frau Platen, Hausbesitzerin
- Hilde Schneider as Hermine, Hugos zweite geschiedene Frau
- Gerda Maria Terno as Eva, Hugos erste geschiedene Frau
- Lotte Rausch as Frau Wagenlenker, Hugos Vermieterin
- Maly Delschaft as Amalie Bernau
- Armin Schweizer as Emil Bernau, Mieter in Frau Platens Haus
- Albert Florath as Landgerichtsdirektor
- Paul Bildt as Stadtrat Krüger
- Werner Schott as Kapitän
- Irene Andor as Wirtschafterin der Apotheke
- Charly Berger as Beisitzender Richter
- Otto Braml as Wilhelm, Möbelpacker
- Gerhard Dammann as Wirt
- Jac Diehl as Gast im Pavillon
- Aribert Grimmer as August, Möbelpacker
- Knut Hartwig as Hugo's defense lawyer
- Clemens Hasse as Ein Matrose
- Carl Iban as 3. Möbelpacker
- Antonie Jaeckel as Mieterin
- Melitta Klefer as Frau beim Kameradschaftstreffen
- Erwin Laurenz as Normann, der junge Ehemann
- Lucia Lumera as Frau Liesegang
- Hellmuth Passarge as Gast beim Kameradschaftstreffen
- Wera Schultz as Anna, Mädchen bei Frau Platen
- Rudolf Schündler as Lawyer
- Albert Venohr as Portier
- Egon Vogel as Gast beim Kameradschaftstreffen
- Eduard Wenck as Auktionator
- Willy Witte as Trauzeuge

== Bibliography ==
- Etlin, Richard A. (2002). Art, Culture, and Media Under the Third Reich. Chicago: University of Chicago Press. ISBN 978-0-226-22087-1.
- Hake, Sabine (2001). Popular Cinema of the Third Reich. Austin: University of Texas Press. ISBN 978-0-292-73458-6.
