= Snow White (1955 film) =

1955 film

Schneewittchen
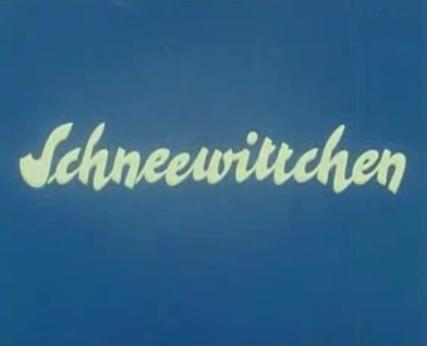
- Title card
- Directed by: Erich Kobler
- Written by: Konrad Lustig; Walter Oehmichen
- Based on: Snow White as collected by The Brothers Grimm
- Produced by: Hubert Schonger
- Starring: Elke Arendt; Adele "Addi" Adametz; Niels Clausnitzer; Dietrich Thoms; Renate Eichholz; Zita Hitz; Erwin Platzer
- Cinematography: Wolf Swan
- Edited by: Horst Rossberger (as Horst Roßberger)
- Music by: Franz Miller; Carl Stueber; Anne Delugg (US version); Milton Delugg (US version)
- Distributed by: Jugendfilm-Verleih (1955) (West Germany) (theatrical); Childhood Productions (USA, English-dubbed) (theatrical)
- Release date: 27 November 1955 (West Germany)
- Running time: 76 min.
- Country: West Germany
- Language: German

Snow White and the Seven Dwarfs (US: Snow White, German: Schneewittchen und die sieben Zwerge, also titled simply as Schneewittchen) is a 1955 West German film, directed by Erich Kobler. It is based on the 1812 story of Schneewittchen by the Brothers Grimm.

== Plot ==
Once upon a time, in deep winter in a kingdom, a young Queen gives birth to a girl, who because of her beauty was named Snow White. The Queen however dies in childbirth. After a year, the King remarries a beautiful but proud and vain woman. The new Queen studies black magic and witchcraft and possesses a Magic Mirror, asking it every day: "Mirror, mirror, on the wall, who is the fairest one of all?" The Magic Mirror would reveal that the Queen is the fairest one of all.

One day, a Prince from the country visits to see Snow White, who is confined inside the castle grounds by the Queen. She tells the Hunter to alert him if Snow White is ever in danger and gifts her a necklace. The Queen was ravaged with jealousy when she witnesses this and learns from her Magic Mirror that Snow White's beauty has surpassed her own. As a result, she orders the Hunter to take Snow White deep into the woods and kill her. But there, he spares Snow White's life, and she flees. Snow White runs through the woods that night and, exhausted, stumbles upon a wooden cottage. She goes inside, helps herself with some food on the table, and falls asleep onto one of the beds. The owners of the cottage, seven dwarfs, return home from work in the mines and see Snow White, who awakens and tells them of her life story and her wicked stepmother's plans. To shield her from the Queen, the Dwarfs let Snow White stay with them in the cottage and she happily agrees to tend to their household needs.

Back at the castle, the Queen consults her Magic Mirror, which reveals that Snow White is alive and living with the seven dwarfs. The Queen, realizing that she has been tricked, incarcerates the Hunter, and devises plans to eliminate Snow White herself. She disguises herself first as a peddler woman selling laces, then goes to the cottage and finds Snow White, placing a lace onto her so tight that she would suffocate. That plan is foiled after the Dwarfs come home and rescue Snow White. So, for a second time, the Queen disguises herself as another peddler woman, selling combs. She places one laced with poison onto Snow White's head, incapacitating her. But the Dwarfs find Snow White later and revive her. Undeterred, the Queen goes to her witchcraft room, devises a potion to turn herself into an old countrywoman, and poisons an apple. One of the Queen's servants overhears her devious plan and immediately informs and secretly frees the Hunter, who goes to the Prince for help. Going back to the cottage for a third time, the Queen, after several tries, successfully tricks a hesitant Snow White into taking a bite of the apple, and she collapses onto the floor. The Dwarfs, sensing danger in the ensuing lightning storm, leave work early and hurry back to the cottage only to find Snow White lying lifelessly on the floor. The Queen rushes away into the woods to escape the raging storm but is struck dead by lightning.

Unable to revive Snow White, the Dwarfs built her a glass coffin and placed her inside, keeping vigil. The Hunter and the Prince, searching for Snow White, spot the Dwarfs with the coffin. The Prince pleads with them to let him take Snow White's coffin back with him to his palace, and they agree after seeing his love for her. While carrying the coffin, one of the Dwarfs trips and the coffin falls to the floor, the jolt dislodging a piece of the poison apple from Snow White's throat, reviving her. Overjoyed, Snow White and the Prince marry, with the Dwarfs throwing them a spectacular wedding party in the woods and they live happily ever after.

== Cast ==
- Elke Arendt – Snow White
- Adele "Addi" Adametz – The Evil Queen, Snow White's evil stepmother
- Niels Clausnitzer – Prince Edelmunt
- Dietrich Thoms – The Huntsman
- Renate Eichholz – The Good Queen, Snow White's mother
- Zita Hitz – Francisca, the Chambermaid
- Erwin Platzer – The Little Moor

== Production ==
Neuschwanstein Castle, in Bavaria, Germany was used as a film set.

The Seven Dwarfs were all played by children from a children's dance group led by Suse Böhm.

== Home media ==
In 2007, Schneewittchen was released on DVD in Germany. The film was also part of a five DVD boxset, which contained other classic live-action German fairytale films made in the 1950s. The film has subsequently been rereleased multiple times by different distributors; this includes 2015 and 2024 by Märchen Klassiker and Filmjuwele respectively.

After its initial 1987 US VHS release by Interglobal Home Video, the English-language dub was released on DVD in 2020 as a part of a double feature from Frolic Pictures.

== See also ==
- List of films about witchcraft
