= The Third Squadron =

1926 film directed by Carl Wilhelm

- Directed by: Carl Wilhelm
- Written by: Bernhard Buchbinder (play); Bobby E. Lüthge; Carl Wilhelm
- Produced by: Willy Zeunert
- Starring: Fritz Spira; Eugen Burg; Reinhold Häussermann; Ida Wüst
- Cinematography: Gustav Ucicky; Eduard von Borsody
- Music by: Hans May
- Production company: Domo-Strauß-Film
- Distributed by: Domo-Strauß-Film
- Release date: 13 August 1926
- Running time: 109 minutes
- Country: Germany
- Languages: Silent; German intertitles

The Third Squadron (German: Die dritte Eskadron) is a 1926 German silent war film directed by Carl Wilhelm and starring Fritz Spira, Eugen Burg, and Reinhold Häussermann. It was shot at the EFA Studios in Berlin and on location in Vienna. The film's art direction was by Otto Erdmann and Hans Sohnle. It was based on a play by Bernhard Buchbinder.

== Cast ==
- Fritz Spira as Kaiser Franz Joseph
- Eugen Burg as Der Herr Oberst
- Reinhold Häussermann as Flickschneider
- Ida Wüst as Frau Oberstin Emilie
- Ralph Arthur Roberts as Herr Rittmeister Vertessy
- Claire Rommer as Fräulein Rittmeister Julie
- Gyula Szőreghy as Rittmeister der Reserve von Mikosch
- Camilla Spira as Ilonka, seine Tochter
- Paul Heidemann as Oberleutnant Huber
- Ernő Verebes as Leutnant Edler
- Paul Morgan as Der Oberarzt
- Kurt Vespermann as Der Einjährig-Freiwilliger
- Sig Arno as Husar Mischka Rappaport
- Karl Victor Plagge as Husar Pali
- Ressel Orla as Mizzi Blank, Tänzerin
- Robert Garrison as Max Freundlich, Finanzier der Eskadron Max Freundlich
- Albert Paulig as Diener Janos
- Eugen Jensen as Graf Paar
- Anton Pointner
- Leopold von Ledebur
- Lydia Potechina

== Bibliography ==
- Grange, William (2008). Cultural Chronicle of the Weimar Republic. Lanham, MD: Scarecrow Press. ISBN 978-0-8108-5967-8.
