= Kora Terry =

1940 film

- Directed by: Georg Jacoby
- Written by: Hans Caspar von Zobeltitz (novel); Lotte Neumann; Walter Wassermann
- Produced by: Max Pfeiffer
- Starring: Marika Rökk; Will Quadflieg; Josef Sieber; Will Dohm
- Cinematography: Konstantin Irmen-Tschet
- Edited by: Erich Kobler
- Music by: Peter Kreuder; Frank Fox
- Production company: Universum Film AG
- Distributed by: Universum Film AG
- Release date: 27 November 1940
- Running time: 110 minutes
- Country: Germany
- Language: German

Kora Terry is a 1940 German drama film directed by Georg Jacoby and starring Marika Rökk, Will Quadflieg and Josef Sieber.

== Cast ==
- Marika Rökk as Kora Terry / Mara Terry
- Will Quadflieg as Michael Varany
- Josef Sieber as Karel Tobias, gen. Tobs
- Will Dohm as Möller, Agent
- Hans Leibelt as Bartos, Direktor des Odeon
- Ursula Herking as Frl. Haase, seine Sekretärn
- Herbert Hübner as Stefan Borodyn, Großindustrieller
- Flockina von Platen as Olly Laurens, seine Schwester
- Franz Schafheitlin as Vopescu
- Maria Koppenhöfer as Managerin der Truppe
- Lotte Spira as Besitzerin des Kinderheims
- Paul Bildt as Doktor der Untersuchungskommission
- Rudolf Carl as Artist mit dem Hundeakt
- Paul Mederow as Member of the commission of inquiry
