= Fritz Spira =

Austrian actor

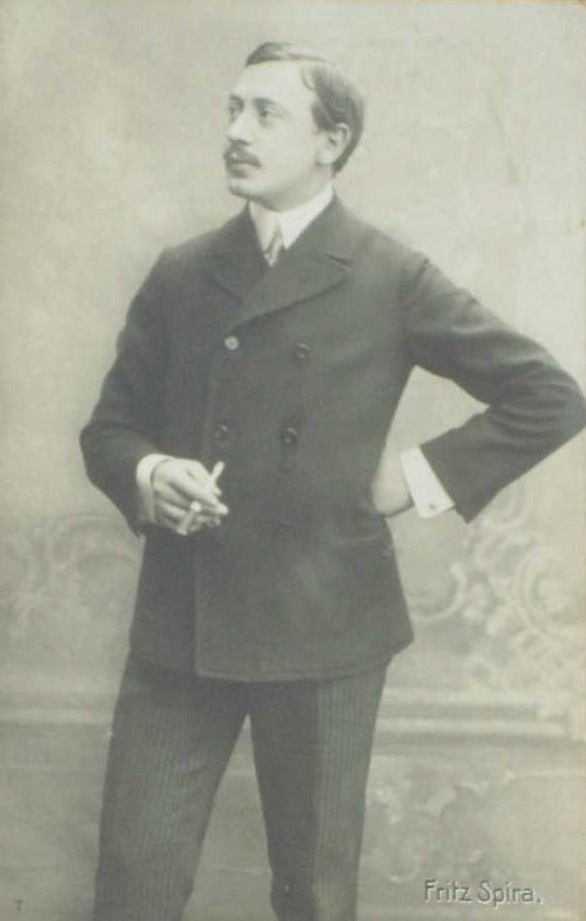
- Spira, ca. 1910
- Born: Jakob Spira; 1 August 1881; Vienna, Austro-Hungarian Empire
- Died: c. 1943 (aged 62); Ruma, Occupied Yugoslavia
- Occupations: Film actor Stage actor
- Years active: 1910–1935 (film)
- Spouse(s): Lotte Spira (m. 1905- div. 1934); Charlotte Andresen (m. ?-1943)
- Children: Camilla Spira; Steffie Spira

Fritz Spira (1 August 1881 – c. 1943) was an Austrian stage and film actor. He appeared frequently in films during the silent and early sound eras. Spira played the role of the Austrian Emperor Franz Josef in the 1926 film The Third Squadron. Spira had been working in Germany before the Nazi takeover in 1933 compelled him to leave because of his Jewish background. He went first to Poland, then returned to his native Austria. Following the Anchluss he tried to leave, but was arrested. He died in 1943 at the Ruma concentration camp in Vojvodina.

== Family ==
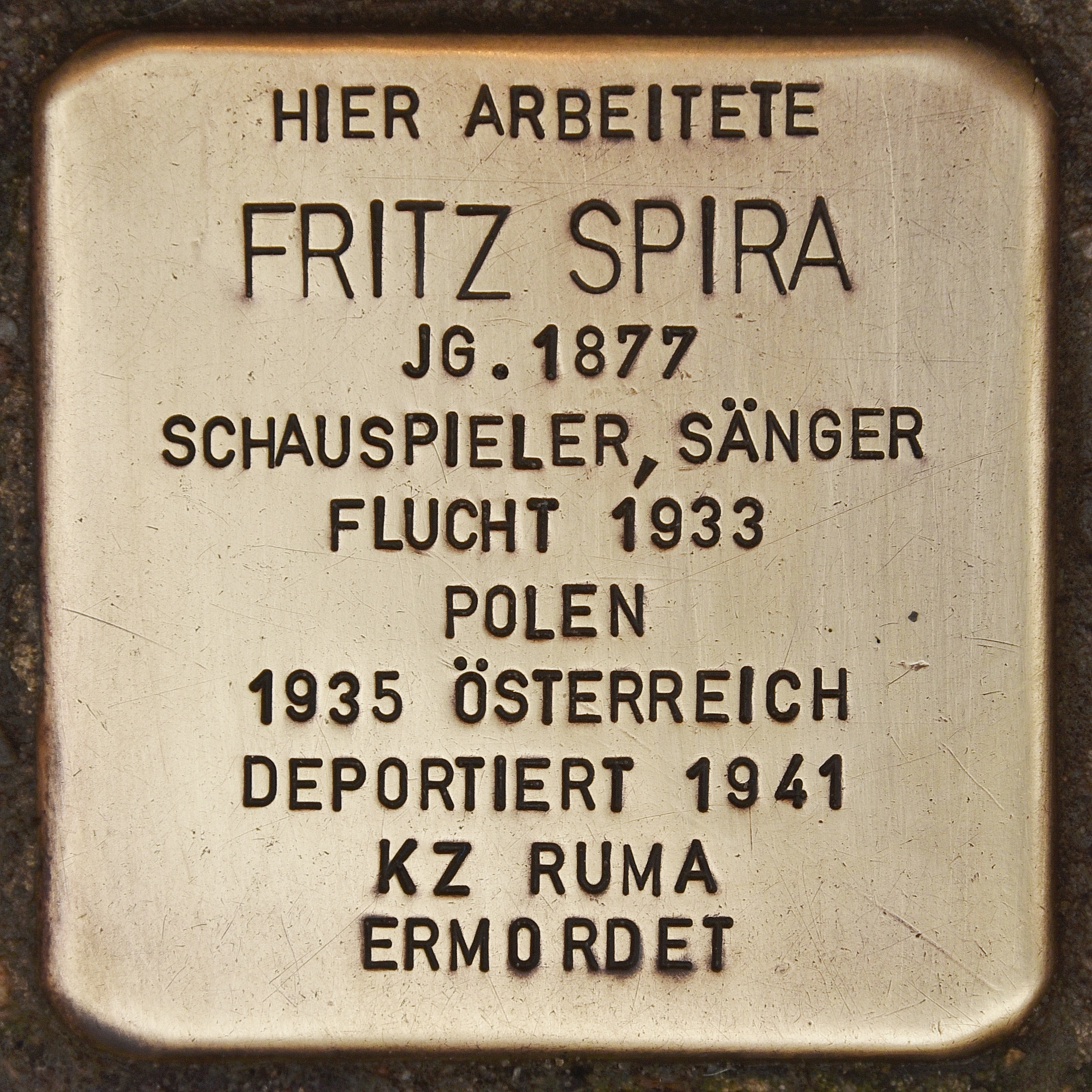
Stolperstein for Spira at Behrenstraße 55–57, in Berlin-Mitte

He was married to Lotte Spira from 1905-1934 and was the father of the actresses Camilla Spira and Steffie Spira. Camilla would survive the Holocaust because her mother signed a statement swearing that Fritz was not Camilla's natural father, despite her being an adult.

== Selected filmography ==
- Ferdinand Lassalle (1918)
- Countess Maritza (1925)
- Love and Trumpets (1925)
- A Free People (1925)
- We Belong to the Imperial-Royal Infantry Regiment (1926)
- The Third Squadron (1926)
- The Red Mouse (1926)
- The Trumpets are Blowing (1926)
- Unmarried Daughters (1926)
- Women of Passion (1926)
- Nanette Makes Everything (1926)
- Vienna - Berlin (1926)
- The Dashing Archduke (1927)
- On the Banks of the River Weser (1927)
- Family Gathering in the House of Prellstein (1927)
- When the Mother and the Daughter (1928)
- Endangered Girls (1928)
- The Fate of the House of Habsburg (1928)
- The Alley Cat (1929)
- The Fourth from the Right (1929)
- What's Wrong with Nanette? (1929)
- Darling of the Gods (1930)
- Fairground People (1930)
- Two Worlds (1930)
- Duty is Duty (1931)
- Terror of the Garrison (1931)
- Johann Strauss (1931)
- Johnny Steals Europe (1932)
- The Ladies Diplomat (1932)
- Grandstand for General Staff (1932)
- Viennese Waltz (1932)
- Gitta Discovers Her Heart (1932)
- The Hymn of Leuthen (1933)
- The Emperor's Waltz (1933)
- The Roberts Case (1933)

== Bibliography ==
- Baer, Hester. Dismantling the Dream Factory: Gender, German Cinema, and the Postwar Quest for a New Film Language. Berghahn Books, 2012.
