= Max Pfeiffer =

German film producer

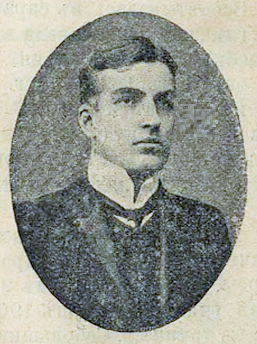
- Born: 8 May 1881; St. Petersburg, Russian Empire
- Died: 5 September 1947 (aged 66); Berlin, Allied-occupied Germany
- Occupation: Producer
- Years active: 1928–1947 (film )

Max Pfeiffer (8 May 1881 – 5 September 1947) was a Russian-born German film producer.

== Selected filmography ==
- Asphalt (1929)
- Princess, At Your Orders! (1931)
- Quick (1932)
- Goodbye, Beautiful Days (1933)
- Happy Days in Aranjuez (1933)
- Young Dessau's Great Love (1933)
- Count Woronzeff (1934)
- Playing with Fire (1934)
- The Csardas Princess (1934)
- Make Me Happy (1935)
- The Beggar Student (1936)
- Fanny Elssler (1937)
- Lucky Kids (1937)
- Gasparone (1937)
- Seven Slaps (1937)
- Nanon (1938)
- Woman at the Wheel (1939)
- Kora Terry (1940)
- Women Are Better Diplomats (1941)
- A Wife for Three Days (1944)
- A Cheerful House (1944)

== Bibliography ==
- Thomas Elsaesser. Weimar Cinema and After: Germany's Historical Imaginary. Routledge, 2013.
