= Princess, At Your Orders! =

1931 film

- Poster
- Directed by: Hanns Schwarz; Max de Vaucorbeil
- Written by: Jean Boyer; Paul Frank; Robert Liebmann; Billy Wilder
- Produced by: Max Pfeiffer
- Starring: Lilian Harvey; Henri Garat; Jean Mercanton
- Cinematography: Konstantin Irmen-Tschet; Günther Rittau
- Edited by: Willy Zeyn
- Music by: Werner R. Heymann
- Production company: UFA
- Distributed by: L'Alliance Cinématographique Européenne
- Release date: 2 April 1931
- Running time: 82 minutes
- Country: Germany
- Language: French

Princess, At Your Orders! (French: Princesse, à vos ordres!) is a 1931 German romantic comedy film directed by Hanns Schwarz and Max de Vaucorbeil and starring Lilian Harvey, Henri Garat, and Jean Mercanton. It was produced by UFA as the French-language version of the studio's film Her Grace Commands. In the early years of sound films, before the practice of dubbing became widespread, it was common for a film to be reshot in multiple languages.

The film's sets were designed by the art director Erich Kettelhut.

== Cast ==
- Lilian Harvey as La princesse Marie-Christine
- Henri Garat as Carl de Berck
- Jean Mercanton as Le petit roi
- Marcel Vibert as Heynitz
- Bill Bocket as Pipac
- Raymond Guérin-Catelain as Le Prince de Leuchtenstein
- Théo Tony
- Marcel Merminod
- Comedian Harmonists as Les cuisiniers

== Bibliography ==
- Crisp, Colin. French Cinema—A Critical Filmography: Volume 1, 1929–1939, Volume 1; Volumes 1929–1939. Indiana University Press, 2015.
