= Hanns Schwarz =

Austrian film director (1888–1945)

Hanns Schwarz (11 February 1888 – 27 October 1945) was an Austrian film director. He was born in Vienna on 11 February 1888.

== Biography ==
He directed twenty four films between 1924 and 1937 in both English and German. During the late silent and early sound eras, he was a leading director at the large German studio UFA. In the early 1930s he worked on several multi-language version films for UFA, producing the same films in distinct German and foreign-language versions. Schwarz was Jewish and was therefore forced to leave Germany in 1933 when the Nazis took over, going into exile in Britain. His last film was the 1937 British thriller Return of the Scarlet Pimpernel. He died in California on 27 October 1945.

== Partial filmography ==
- Nanon (1924)
- The Voice of the Heart (1924)
- Two People (1924)
- The Telephone Operator (1925)
- The Little Variety Star (1926)
- Petronella (1927)
- The Csardas Princess (1927)
- Hungarian Rhapsody (1928)
- Melody of the Heart (1929)
- The Wonderful Lies of Nina Petrovna (1929)
- Darling of the Gods (1930)
- Burglars (1930)
- Her Grace Commands (1931)
- Princess, At Your Orders! (1931)
- Caught in the Act (1931)
- Bombs on Monte Carlo (1931)
- Captain Craddock (1931) (French-language version of Monte Carlo Madness, co-director Max de Vaucorbeil)
- Monte Carlo Madness (1932) (English-language version of Monte Carlo Madness)
- Montparnasse Girl (1932)
- Gypsies of the Night (1932)
- Prince of Arcadia (1933)
- Return of the Scarlet Pimpernel (1937)
