= Lotte Spira =

German actress

- Born: Charlotte Andresen; 24 April 1883; Berlin, German Empire
- Died: 17 December 1943 (aged 60); Berlin, Nazi Germany
- Other names: Lotte Spira-Andersen; Lotte Spira-Andresen
- Occupations: Film and stage actress
- Years active: 1923-1943 (film)
- Spouse: Fritz Spira (1905–1934; divorced)
- Children: Camilla Spira; Steffie Spira

Lotte Spira (German: [ˈlɔ.tə ˈʃpiː.ʁaː]; 24 April 1883 – 17 December 1943) was a German stage and film actress. She appeared in supporting roles in around seventy films.

She was married to the Austrian actor Fritz Spira in 1905. In 1934 she divorced her Jewish husband under duress from the Nazi authorities. During the Second World War she signed a statement swearing Spira was not the real father of her daughter Camilla Spira, who was being held at Westerbork transit camp in the Netherlands.

Shortly after Lotte Spira received news of her ex-husband's death in a concentration camp in Yugoslavia, she died of natural causes, aged 60. Her other daughter Steffie Spira, also an actress, managed to escape into exile.

== Selected filmography ==
- Hallig Hooge (1923)
- The False Prince (1927)
- Waltz of Love (1930)
- Love's Carnival (1930)
- Ash Wednesday (1931)
- Impossible Love (1932)
- Scandal in Budapest (1933)
- The Lost Valley (1934)
- Hermine and the Seven Upright Men (1935)
- Lady Windermere's Fan (1935)
- Confetti (1936)
- Victoria in Dover (1936)
- The Unknown (1936)
- Dangerous Game (1937)
- The Irresistible Man (1937)
- The Mystery of Betty Bonn (1938)
- The Mountain Calls (1938)
- The Secret Lie (1938)
- Congo Express (1939)
- The Governor (1939)
- The Right to Love (1939)
- The Scoundrel (1939)
- Woman at the Wheel (1939)
- The Journey to Tilsit (1939)
- Maria Ilona (1939)
- Bel Ami (1939)
- Left of the Isar, Right of the Spree (1940)
- The Unfaithful Eckehart (1940)
- Eine kleine Nachtmusik (1940)
- Kora Terry (1940)
- Six Days of Leave (1941)
- Zirkus Renz (1943)
- The Woman of My Dreams (1944)

== Bibliography ==
- Baer, Hester. Dismantling the Dream Factory: Gender, German Cinema, and the Postwar Quest for a New Film Language. Berghahn Books, 2012.
