= Leza Lidow =

American artist

Elizabeth H. Lidow (February 5, 1924 – September 1, 2014) was an American artist.

== Biography ==
Elizabeth H. Lidow was born in Kansas City, Missouri, United States. She was brought up in a creative and intellectual environment. Her father was a World War I pilot, who later found a career as a stunt pilot for film. Her mother, daughter of a Russian diplomat, was born in China, and was an avid collector of Asian art and translated Asian poetry.

At an early age she showed a passion for painting. At 18 she married the composer Friedrich Hollaender, who wrote for Marlene Dietrich as well as for Hollywood films. Film studios were interested in her as a potential actress but she declined in order to paint. She had a daughter with Hollander but after three years the couple divorced.

Her education in art was continued in Paris and Switzerland. In 1951, Lidow returned to Los Angeles and exhibited solo at Roperi's Gallery. Soon after, she married industrialist and founder of International Rectifier Corp, Eric Lidow, and they had two sons together.

In 2005, arthritis had complicated her ability to paint. She started to make short films to continue her artistic expression.

Leza Lidow died on September 1, 2014, at the age of 90.

== Exhibitions ==
2008-2009

- Nanjing Museum of Modern Art, Nanjing, China (Selected Solo Exhibitions)
- Hubei Museum of Art, Hubei, China (Solo)

2007

- Shanghai Grand Theatre Gallery, Shanghai China (Selected Solo Exhibitions)
- Beijing World Art Museum, Beijing, China (Selected Solo Exhibitions)

2006

- The Academy of Fine Arts of St Petersburg (Selected Solo Exhibitions)

2004

- Moscow Museum Of Contemporary History (Selected Solo Exhibitions)
- "Cloning" La Roche-sur-Foron, Haute-Savoie, France (Selected Solo Exhibitions)

2003

- "Cloning", Florence, Italy, Fortezza da Basso (Selected Solo Exhibitions)
- BIAC Terza Biennale d'Arte Contemporanea. Arezzo, Italy, Galleria Transit (Selected Solo Exhibitions)
- Montreux, Switzerland, Galerie Sabine Gonard (Theme Exhibitions)
- Piombino, Italy Galleria comunale, Parfums de Femmes (Theme Exhibitions)
- Paris, Saint-Germain-en-Laye, Parfums de Femmes (Theme Exhibitions)
- Perugia, Italy, Torre Strozzi, Centro per L'Arte contemporanea (Theme Exhibitions).
- Castiglione di Firenze, Italy, Chiesa San Lorenzo (Theme Exhibitions)
- La Roche-sur-Foron, France, 5eme Festival de la Sculpture contemporaine (Theme Exhibitions)

2002

- Serre di Rapolano, Italy, Museo comunale. En Cent Metamorphoses: La Femme (Theme Exhibitions)

2001

- Geneva, Palexpo, Suisse Europ'Art. Hote d'honneur (Theme Exhibitions)
- Gruyères, Switzerland, Centre international de L'Art fantastique (Theme Exhibitions).
- Neuchâtel, Switzerland, Hotel de ville, Festival international du film fantastique (Theme Exhibitions)
- Reggio Emilia, Italy, Biennale Internazionale dell'Arte Contemporanea (Theme Exhibitions)

1998/1999.

- "The Last Supper", "Pollution Series", Nevada (Selected Solo Exhibitions)
- Institute of Contemporary Art, Las Vegas, Nevada (Selected Solo Exhibitions)
- "The Eternal Game", "Pollution Series", The Lowe Gallery, Atlanta, Georgia (Selected Solo Exhibitions)

1997

- "Pollution Series", Louis Stern Fine Arts, Los Angeles (Selected Solo Exhibitions)

1995

- "The Zodiacs", Musee Chateau de Gruyeres, Gruyeres, Switzerland (Group Exhibitions)
- Miami Art Exhibition, Miami, Florida (Group Exhibitions)
- Louis Newman Galleries, Beverly Hills, California (Selected Solo Exhibitions)

1994

- "Contemporary Perspectives II", Louis Newman Galleries, Beverley Hills, California (Group Exhibitions)
- Salon des Peintres du XVI, Paris, France (Group Exhibitions)
- "The Eternal Game"' or "The Battle of the Sexes", CNIT, Paris, France (Selected Solo Exhibitions)
- "Le Mercredi", Centre Culturel de Courbevoie, Courbevoie, France (Selected Solo Exhibitions)
- "The Eternal Game", or the "Battle of the Sexes", Museum Chateau de Gruyères, Gruyères, Suisse (Selected Solo Exhibitions)

1992/93

- Salon Societe des Artistes Francais, Le Grand Palais des Champs-Élysées, Paris, France (Group Exhibitions)
- Salon d' Automne '92 Les Grands Palais des Champs-Élysées, Paris, France (Group Exhibitions)
- Galerie Carpentier, Paris, France (Selected Solo Exhibitions)
- Louis Newman Galleries, Beverley Hills, California (Selected Solo Exhibitions)
- "Le Tarot", Musee Chateau de Gruyeres, Gruyeres, Suisse (Group Exhibitions)

Mondial Arts Salon Avignon 93, Avignon, France (Gold Medal Award-Group Exhibitions)

- "Dark Suburban Fantasies", Art Institute of So. California, Laguna Beach California (Group Exhibitions)
- Art Chicago International, Expo Center, Chicago (Group Exhibitions)
- "Les sens au feminin"' Musee Charlier, Brussels, Belgium (Group Exhibitions)
- Paris Country Club, Rueil, France (Selected Solo Exhibitions)
- Centre Culturel de Courbevoie, Courbevoie, France (Selected Solo Exhibitions)
- Louis Newman Galleries, Beverley Hills, California (Selected Solo Exhibitions)

1990/91

- Louis Newman Galleries, Beverley Hills, California (Selected Solo Exhibitions)
- Joan Ankrum Gallery, Los Angeles, California (Selected Solo Exhibitions)

1989

- Joan Ankrum Gallery, Los Angeles, California (Selected Solo Exhibitions)

1987/88

- Galerie Carpentier, Paris, France (Selected Solo Exhibitions)
- Galleria Pirra, Turin, Italy (Selected Solo Exhibitions)

1985/86

- Joan Ankrum Gallery, 25th Anniversary, Los Angeles, California (Group Exhibitions)
- Musee de Bastien, Antibes, France (Selected Solo Exhibitions)

1984

- Capricorn Gallery, Bethesda, Maryland (Selected Solo Exhibitions)
- Joan Ankrum Gallery, Los Angeles, California (Selected Solo Exhibitions)

1982/83

- Security Pacific Bank, Los Angeles, California (Selected Solo Exhibitions)
- Joan Ankrum Gallery, Los Angeles, California (Selected Solo Exhibitions)

1981

- Gallery Paule Anglim, San Francisco (Selected Solo Exhibitions)

1978

- Pavilion Gallery, Scottsdale, Arizona (Selected Solo Exhibitions)

1952

- American Watercolor Society, Miami, Florida; Denver, Colorado; New York, New York (Group Exhibitions)

1951

- Royer's Gallery, Los Angeles (Selected Solo Exhibitions)
