= A Free People =

1925 film directed by Martin Berger

- Directed by: Martin Berger
- Written by: Martin Berger
- Starring: Albert Florath; Ellen Plessow
- Cinematography: Willy Großstück; Paul Holzki
- Production company: Veritas-Film
- Release date: 25 November 1925
- Country: Germany
- Languages: Silent; German intertitles

A Free People (German: Freies Volk) is a 1925 German silent drama film directed by Martin Berger and starring Albert Florath and Ellen Plessow. It is now considered a lost film.

It was one of two films made by Berger under commission from the SPD along with 1924's The Forge. Neither of them were commercial successes on release. The film's art direction was by Robert A. Dietrich.

A servant leads a campaign against the justice of his employer, leading eventually to civil war and a general strike.

== Cast ==
In alphabetical order

- Rudolf Essek as Vorsitzender des Gewerkschaftsbundes Anders
- Albert Florath
- Emmerich Hanus as Direktor Frank
- Martin Herzberg as Gustel Jessen
- Adolf Klein
- Robert Leffler as Inspektor Legath
- Ellen Plessow as Fräulein von Woythe
- Anton Pointner as Adjutant
- Paul Rehkopf as Arbeiter Jürgens
- Georg H. Schnell as Oberst Eckart
- Maria Simrock as Frau Jessen
- Camilla Spira
- Fritz Spira as Großkaufmann Lahr
- Mathilde Sussin as Frau von Großkaufmann Lahr
- Eduard von Winterstein as Administrator von Nehling
- Elsa Wagner as Frau Karg
- Walter Werner as Prokurist Karg
- Mathias Wieman
- Heinrich Witte as Hausdiener Jessen

== Bibliography ==
- Grange, William (2008). Cultural Chronicle of the Weimar Republic. Lanham, MD: Scarecrow Press. ISBN 978-0-8108-5967-8.
- Murray, Bruce Arthur (1990). Film and the German Left in the Weimar Republic: From Caligari to Kuhle Wampe. Austin: University of Texas Press. ISBN 978-0-292-72465-5.
