= Inquest (1931 German film) =

1931 film

- Directed by: Robert Siodmak
- Written by: Max Alsberg (play); Ernst Hesse (play); Robert Liebmann; Hans Müller; Robert Siodmak
- Produced by: Erich Pommer
- Starring: Albert Bassermann; Gustav Fröhlich; Hans Brausewetter
- Cinematography: Otto Baecker; Konstantin Irmen-Tschet
- Edited by: Viktor Gertler
- Production company: UFA
- Distributed by: UFA
- Release date: 20 April 1931
- Running time: 95 minutes
- Country: Germany
- Language: German

Inquest (German: Voruntersuchung) is a 1931 German crime film directed by Robert Siodmak and starring Albert Bassermann, Gustav Fröhlich and Hans Brausewetter. Along with another film that Siodmak made the same year Storms of Passion, it anticipates the later development of film noir. It was made by German's largest studio Universum Film, with sets designed by art director Erich Kettelhut. Paul Martin, who soon after emerged as a leading director, was assistant director to Siodmak on the film. It was based on a 1927 play of the same title by Max Alsberg and Ernst Hesse. A separate French-language version About an Inquest was also produced.

== Synopsis ==
When a prostitute is murdered in a cheap Berlin boarding house, an investigating judge suspects that the killer is her boyfriend, unaware that his own son and daughter are also mixed up in the case.

== Background ==
The film was shot from February 18 to March 1931 in Berlin-Tiergarten and in the Ufa studio in Neubabelsberg. The buildings were created by Erich Kettelhut. The street signs and house numbers in the picture indicate Mittelstraße 63 as the location of the action.

== Cast ==
- Albert Bassermann as Dr. Konrad Bienert, Landgerichtsrat
- Gustav Fröhlich as Fritz Bernt, Student
- Hans Brausewetter as Walter Bienert, Beinerts Sohn, Student
- Charlotte Ander as Gerda Bienert - Bienerts Tochter
- Anni Markart as Erna Kabisch
- Edith Meinhard as Mella Ziehr
- Oskar Sima as Karl Zülke, Portier
- Julius Falkenstein as Anatol Scherr, ein Hausbewohner
- Heinrich Gretler as Kurt Brann, sein Untermieter
- Hermann Speelmans as Bruno Klatte, Artist
- Jakob Tiedtke as Ein genierter Herr
- Gerhard Bienert as Baumann, Kriminalkommissar
- Heinz Berghaus as Schneider, Kriminalbeamter
- Carl Lambertin as Kriebel, Kiminalbeamter
- Emilia Unda
- Erwin Splettstößer

== Bibliography ==
- Spicer, Andrew (2010). Historical Dictionary of Film Noir. Scarecrow Press. ISBN 978-0-8108-7378-0.
