= Caught in the Act (1931 film) =

1931 film

- Directed by: Hanns Schwarz; Georges Tréville
- Written by: Louis Verneuil (play); Robert Liebmann; Jean Boyer (lyrics)
- Produced by: Erich Pommer
- Starring: Blanche Montel; Henri Garat; Ralph Arthur Roberts
- Cinematography: Konstantin Irmen-Tschet; Günther Rittau
- Edited by: Willy Zeyn
- Music by: Friedrich Hollaender; Franz Waxman
- Production company: UFA
- Distributed by: L'Alliance Cinématographique Européenne
- Release date: 27 February 1931
- Running time: 98 minutes
- Country: Germany
- Language: French

Caught in the Act (French: Flagrant délit) is a 1931 German comedy film directed by Hanns Schwarz and Georges Tréville and starring Blanche Montel, Henri Garat, and Ralph Arthur Roberts. It was produced by UFA, as the French-language version of the studio's film Burglars. Such multiple-language versions were common in the early years of sound before dubbing became widespread.

The film's sets were designed by the art director Erich Kettelhut. It was shot at the Babelsberg Studios.

== Cast ==
- Blanche Montel as Renée Dumontier
- Henri Garat as Jean Durand
- Ralph Arthur Roberts as Albert Dumontier
- Charles Dechamps as Le Baron de Sérigny
- Louis Baron fils as Commissionaire
- Gustave Gallet as Le Domestique
- Fernande Albany as Hortense
- Renée Rysor as La bonne

== Bibliography ==
- Crisp, Colin (2015). French Cinema: A Critical Filmography. Vol. 1, 1929–1939. Bloomington: Indiana University Press. ISBN 978-0-253-01703-1.
