= Trude Marlen =

Austrian actress

- Born: Trude Posch; 7 November 1912; Graz, Austro-Hungarian Empire
- Died: 9 June 2005 (aged 92); Vienna, Austria
- Other name: Trude Posch
- Occupation: Actress
- Years active: 1933–2001

Trude Marlen (born Trude Posch; 7 November 1912 – 9 June 2005) was an Austrian stage and film actress. She was the second wife of Wolf Albach-Retty, and moved to Germany to live with him during the Nazi era where she was well-connected with the Nazi leadership. She appeared in lead roles in several German films of the 1930s such as Bachelor's Paradise (1939) although she remained primarily a theatre actress. She later relocated to Vienna and appeared in a number of Austrian films during the post-Second World War years such as Who Kisses Whom? (1947).

== Selected filmography ==
- Young Dessau's Great Love (1933)
- Love Conquers All (1934)
- Playing with Fire (1934)
- Marriage Strike (1935)
- Romance (1936)
- A Hoax (1936)
- The Empress's Favourite (1936)
- The Grey Lady (1937)
- The Missing Wife (1937)
- Bachelor's Paradise (1939)
- I Am Sebastian Ott (1939)
- Operetta (1940)
- Who Kisses Whom? (1947)
- Adventure in Vienna (1952)
- I Love Vienna (1991)

== Bibliography ==
- Fritsche, Maria. Homemade Men In Postwar Austrian Cinema: Nationhood, Genre and Masculinity . Berghahn Books, 2013.
