= Romance (1936 film) =

- Poster using the film's German release title
- Directed by: Herbert Selpin
- Written by: Curt J. Braun; Josef Wenter; Walter Zerlett-Olfenius
- Starring: Christl Mardayn; Carl Esmond; Trude Marlen
- Cinematography: Theodore J. Pahle
- Edited by: Alexandra Anatra
- Music by: Günther Brehn; Harry Hilm; Michael Jary; August Pepöck
- Production company: Patria-Film
- Distributed by: Kiba Kinobetriebsanstalt; Tobis Film (Germany)
- Release date: 9 December 1936
- Running time: 83 minutes
- Country: Austria
- Language: German

Romance (German: Romanze) is a 1936 Austrian drama film directed by Herbert Selpin and starring Christl Mardayn, Carl Esmond and Trude Marlen.

The film's sets were designed by Julius von Borsody. The film was shot at the Rosenhügel Studios in Vienna.

== Cast ==
- Christl Mardayn as Helga Leonhardt
- Carl Esmond as Graf Eduard Romanel
- Trude Marlen as Tänzerin (Dancer)
- Herbert Hübner as Präsident Leonhardt
- Rudolf Schündler as Hartwig - Sekretär
- Fritz Imhoff
- Annie Rosar
- Robert Valberg
- Franz Herterich
- Mihail Xantho
- Richard Waldemar
- Ernst Pröckl
- Julius Karsten
- Josef Bergauer
- Eugen Guenther
- Karl Kneidinger

== Bibliography ==
- Bock, Hans-Michael & Bergfelder, Tim. The Concise CineGraph. Encyclopedia of German Cinema. Berghahn Books, 2009.
