= Playing with Fire (1934 film) =

1934 film

- Directed by: Ralph Arthur Roberts
- Written by: Herbert B. Fredersdorf; Ralph Arthur Roberts; Roland Schacht
- Produced by: Max Pfeiffer
- Starring: Paul Hörbiger; Trude Marlen; Elga Brink
- Cinematography: Fritz Arno Wagner
- Edited by: Hans Wolff
- Music by: Werner Bochmann
- Production company: UFA
- Distributed by: UFA
- Release date: 18 September 1934
- Running time: 87 minutes
- Country: Germany
- Language: German

Playing with Fire (German: Spiel mit dem Feuer) is a 1934 German comedy film directed by Ralph Arthur Roberts and starring Paul Hörbiger, Trude Marlen and Elga Brink.

The film's sets were designed by the art director Erich Kettelhut and Max Mellin.

== Cast ==
- Paul Hörbiger as Dr. Alfred Kramer
- Trude Marlen as Annette - seine Frau
- Elga Brink as Sylvia Bernhardt - Sängerin
- Willi Schaeffers as Gründlich, Schriftsteller
- Horst Birr as Emil Kummerberg, Kellner
- Ellen Hille as Marie, Mädchen bei Kramer
- Hilde Krüger as Helene, Zofe bei Sylvia
- Aribert Wäscher as Whitemann, Manager
- Ernst Hofmann
- Josef Reithofer
- Ernst G. Schiffner
- Hans Sternberg
- Toni Tetzlaff
- Boris Walt

== Bibliography ==
- Elsaesser, Thomas; Wedel, Michael, eds. (1999). The BFI companion to German cinema. British Film Institute. ISBN 978-0-85170-750-1.
