= Steffie Spira =

Austrian-German actress

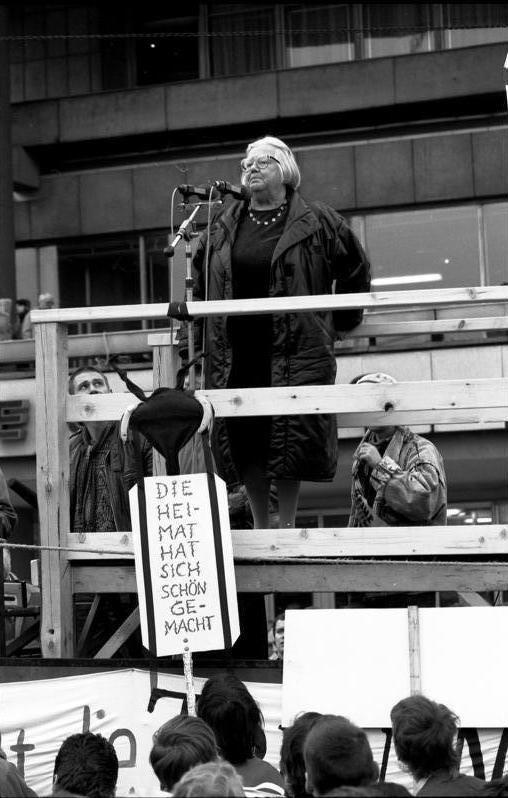
- Spira addressing the Alexanderplatz demonstration in 1989.
- Born: 2 June 1908; Vienna, Austro-Hungarian Empire
- Died: 10 May 1995 (aged 86); Berlin, Germany
- Occupations: Film and stage actress
- Years active: 1929–1992 (film)
- Parent(s): Fritz Spira; Lotte Spira
- Relatives: Camilla Spira (sister)

Steffie Spira (2 June 1908 – 10 May 1995) was an Austrian-born German stage, film and television actress. Spira was the daughter of actors Fritz and Lotte Spira. Her sister was actress Camilla Spira.

Her father was of Jewish descent, and died in a concentration camp during the Holocaust. Spira became a theatre actress during the Weimar Republic, and joined the German Communist Party in 1929.

Following the Nazi takeover of power, she fled into exile. After being interned by the French government at the Camp de Rieucros, she escaped to Mexico. Spira returned to Europe in 1947 and settled in East Germany. She became a leading stage actor at the Volksbühne and appeared frequently in East German film and television productions.

In 1989, Spira was a speaker at the large Alexanderplatz demonstration calling for the current East German government to step down.

== Selected filmography ==
- The Great Mandarin (1949)
- Bürgermeister Anna (1950)
- Ernst Thälmann (1954–1955)
- Heimliche Ehen (1956)
- Thomas Müntzer (1956)
- Apple Trees (1992)

== Bibliography ==
- Edwards, Lee (2000). The Collapse of Communism. Stanford, CA: Hoover Institution Press. ISBN 978-0-8179-9812-7.
