= Young Dessau's Great Love =

1933 film directed by Arthur Robison

- Directed by: Arthur Robison
- Written by: Bobby E. Lüthge; Philipp Lothar Mayring; Christian Uhlenbruck
- Produced by: Max Pfeiffer
- Starring: Willy Fritsch; Trude Marlen; Paul Hörbiger
- Cinematography: Friedl Behn-Grund
- Edited by: Herbert B. Fredersdorf
- Music by: Eduard Künneke
- Production company: UFA
- Distributed by: UFA
- Release date: 22 December 1933
- Running time: 98 minutes
- Country: Germany
- Language: German

Young Dessau's Great Love (German: Des jungen Dessauers große Liebe) is a 1933 German historical romance film directed by Arthur Robison and starring Willy Fritsch, Trude Marlen and Paul Hörbiger. The film is based on the real-life courtship between Leopold I, Prince of Anhalt-Dessau and Anna Luise Föhse. It was shot at the Babelsberg Studios in Potsdam. The film's sets were designed by Erich Kettelhut and Max Mellin. It premiered at the Ufa-Palast am Zoo in Berlin. A separate French-language version, Tambour battant, was also produced.

== Synopsis ==
In the late seventeenth century Leopold, the Prince of Anhalt-Dessau, falls in love with Anna Luise the daughter of an apothecary. Leopold's mother the dowager duchess is appalled at such a gulf in social status and does everything she can to break the couple up so that her son can marry a princess of equal rank. Leopold goes off to serve in the Nine Years' War, but hearing that his mother is now trying to pressuure Anna Luise into marrying another man, he sends his sergeant to rescue her. The couple marry morganatically, but the sympathetic Emperor issues a decree raising Anna Luise to the rank of countess so she is now of acceptable rank.

== Cast ==
- Willy Fritsch as Fürst Leopold von Anhalt-Dessau
- Trude Marlen as Anneliese, Foeses Tochter
- Paul Hörbiger as Der Kaiser
- Ida Wüst as Fürstinmutter
- Gustav Waldau as Baron von Chalisac
- Hermann Speelmans as Greschke, Sergeant
- Jakob Tiedtke as Foese - Apotheker
- Alexander Engel as Kandidat Schmitt
- Hubert von Meyerinck as Graf von Syringen
- Walter von Allwoerden as 1. Gesandter
- Hadrian Maria Netto as 2. Gesandter
- Hans Sternberg as Der Bürgermeister
- Paul Mederow as Oberst Hall
- Alice Treff as Prinzessin Marie von Hessen

== Bibliography ==
- Klaus, Ulrich J. Deutsche Tonfilme: Jahrgang 1933. Klaus-Archiv, 1988.
- Kreimeier, Klaus. The Ufa Story: A History of Germany's Greatest Film Company, 1918-1945. University of California Press, 1999.
- Waldman, Harry. Nazi Films In America, 1933-1942. McFarland & Co, 2008.
