= About an Inquest =

1931 film

- Lobby card
- French: Autour d'une enquête
- Directed by: Henri Chomette; Robert Siodmak
- Written by: Max Alsberg (play); Ernst Hesse (play); Robert Liebmann; Raoul Ploquin; Henri Chomette
- Produced by: Erich Pommer
- Starring: Annabella; Jean Périer; Colette Darfeuil
- Cinematography: Otto Baecker; Konstantin Irmen-Tschet
- Edited by: Viktor Gertler
- Production company: UFA
- Distributed by: L'Alliance Cinématographique Européenne
- Release date: 5 June 1931
- Running time: 93 minutes
- Country: Germany
- Language: French

About an Inquest (French: Autour d'une enquête) is a 1931 German crime film directed by Henri Chomette and Robert Siodmak and starring Annabella, Jean Périer and Colette Darfeuil. It was produced by UFA, as the French-language version of the studio's film Inquest. Such multiple-language versions were common in the early years of sound before dubbing became widespread.

It was shot at the Babelsberg Studios in Berlin. The film's sets were designed by the art director Erich Kettelhut.

== Cast ==
- Annabella as Greta Bienert
- Jean Périer as the judge Conrad Bienert
- Colette Darfeuil as Mella Zier
- Florelle as Erna Kabisch
- Pierre Richard-Willm as Paul Brent
- Gaston Modot as Baumann, detective
- Jacques Maury as Walter Binert
- Paul Ollivier as old Scherr
- Robert Ancelin as Klatte
- Bill Bocket as concierge Zühlke
- Pierre Franck as Brann
- Willy Rozier
- Théo Tony
- Laila Bensedira as Singer
