= Camilla Spira =

German actor (1906–1997)

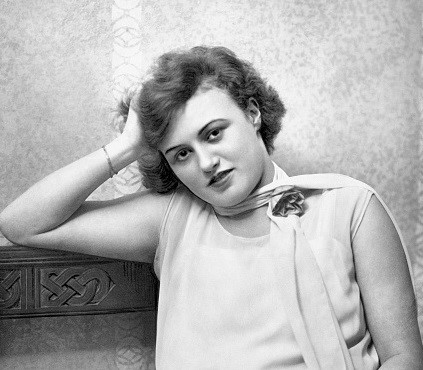
- Spira in 1927
- Born: 1 March 1906; Hamburg, Germany
- Died: 25 August 1997 (aged 91); Berlin, Germany
- Occupation: Actress
- Years active: 1923–1986

Camilla Spira (1 March 1906 – 25 August 1997) was a German film acress. She appeared in 68 films between 1924 and 1986. She was born in Hamburg, Germany, of Jewish ancestry on her father's side, and died in Berlin, Germany. Her father was the Austrian actor Fritz Spira who died in the Ruma concentration camp in 1943. Her mother was actress Lotte Spira and her sister was the East German actress Steffie Spira.

== Selected filmography ==
- The Journey to Happiness (1923) - Maud Murray
- Mutter und Sohn (1924)
- In den Krallen der Schuld (1924) - Matia
- A Free People (1925)
- Im Krug zum grünen Kranze (1925) - Marie, seine Tochter
- The Heart on the Rhine (1925)
- The Pride of the Company (1926) - Minna
- We Belong to the Imperial-Royal Infantry Regiment (1926) - Köchin
- The Third Squadron (1926) - Ilonka, seine Tochter
- Maytime (1926) - Minchen Lemke, die Tochter
- Wrath of the Seas (1926)
- Aftermath (1927) - Marlene - Wirtschafterin
- On the Banks of the River Weser (1927)
- Love's Masquerade (1928) - Zofe
- Sixteen Daughters and No Father (1928)
- My Sister and I (1929) - Schuh-Molly
- Die Jugendgeliebte (1930)
- Die lustigen Musikanten (1930) - Anna Müller - Tochter
- Die Faschingsfee (1931) - Lori
- My Leopold (1931) - Klara, seine Tochter
- Der schönste Mann im Staate (1932) - Julischka
- Scandal on Park Street (1932)
- Ja, treu ist die Soldatenliebe (1932) - Lotte Kramereit
- The Eleven Schill Officers (1932) - Magd Anna
- The Heath Is Green (1932) - Grete Lüdersen
- Haunted People (1932)
- Morgenrot (1933) - GreteJaul, Fredericks' girl
- Jumping Into the Abyss (1933) - Anni
- The Testament of Dr. Mabuse (1933) - Juwelen-Anna
- The Roberts Case (1933) - Maria, seine Frau
- The Judas of Tyrol (1933) - Walpurga
- Her Highness Dances the Waltz (1935)
- Die Buntkarierten (1949) - Guste Schmiedecke
- Dr. Semmelweis (1950) - Josepha Hochleitner
- The Orplid Mystery (1950) - Pensionswirtin
- The Merry Wives of Windsor (1950) - Frau Gretchen Reich
- Three Days of Fear (1952) - Anna Espenlaub, seine Frau
- Pension Schöller (1952) - Ulrike
- The Merry Vineyard (1952) - Annemarie
- Emil and the Detectives (1954) - Emils Tante Martha Heimbold
- Roman eines Frauenarztes (1954) - Oberschwester Lindwedel
- The Devil's General (1955) - Kammersängerin Olivia Geiss
- Father's Day (1955) - Berta Helbig
- The Last Man (1955) - Sabine Hoevelmann
- Sky Without Stars (1955) - Elsbeth Friese
- Two Blue Eyes (1955) - Frau Friedrich
- Love (1956) - Frau Ballard
- Drayman Henschel (1956) - Frau Wermelskirch
- Made in Germany (1957) - Ottilie Zeiss
- The Mad Bomberg (1957) - Frau Kommerzienrat Mühlberg
- The Heart of St. Pauli (1957) - Trudchen Meyer
- Night Nurse Ingeborg (1958) - Frau Roeder
- The Csardas King (1958) - Frau Kalman
- Father, Mother and Nine Children (1958) - Martha Schiller
- Freddy, the Guitar and the Sea (1959) - Mutter Ossenkamp
- Roses for the Prosecutor (1959) - Hildegard Schramm
- Freddy unter fremden Sternen (1959)
- Vertauschtes Leben (1961) - Luise Lindner
- Das Mädchen und der Staatsanwalt (1962) - Gefängnisinsassin
- Piccadilly Zero Hour 12 (1963) - Pamela
