= Fanny Elssler (1937 film) =

1937 film

- Directed by: Paul Martin
- Written by: Eva Leidmann; Paul Martin
- Produced by: Max Pfeiffer
- Starring: Lilian Harvey; Rolf Moebius; Willy Birgel
- Cinematography: Konstantin Irmen-Tschet
- Edited by: Carl Otto Bartning
- Music by: Kurt Schröder
- Production company: UFA
- Distributed by: UFA
- Release date: 4 November 1937
- Running time: 83 minutes
- Country: Germany
- Language: German

Fanny Elssler (German: Fanny Elßler) is a 1937 German historical drama film directed by Paul Martin and starring Lilian Harvey, Rolf Moebius, and Willy Birgel. It was loosely based on the life of the dancer Fanny Elssler. It was shot at the Babelsberg Studios with location filming in Vienna. The film's sets were designed by the art director Erich Kettelhut.

== Plot ==
Vienna, around 1830. The very young dancer Fanny Elssler is celebrating triumphs. Austria's gray eminence, Prince Metternich, sees the impression she makes on men at a party he gives. He therefore wants to bring the artist together with the powerless Duke of Reichstadt, who as Napoleon II is living in exile in Austria and is the son of Napoleon Bonaparte, but without rulership over France. She is to sound him out about any political plans and intentions. Metternich is interested in receiving information on how he feels about the Parisian Bonapartists who are currently stirring up the country. Meternich asks Baron Hofrat von Gentz to instruct Fanny in this regard. Gentz himself shows interest in the much younger dancer, but bows to the royal wish. But Elssler is not so easily manipulated. She sees her reputation as a reputable artist at risk and indignantly rejects Gentz's request.

The still very young Duke of Reichstadt does not yet know anything about Metternich's machinations, but he is aware that he is constantly being watched by his protecting power, Austria. One day he meets Fanny Elssler and is immediately charmed by her. For understandable reasons, Napoleon II chose a pseudonym when he first met and introduced himself as Lieutenant Franz von Mödling. Fanny is as enthusiastic about him as he is about her, and both young people fall in love. The relationship between the two blossoms without the imperial Austrian power brokers suspecting anything of it. It is only during a diplomatic ball given by Prince Metternich that he and his secretary Gentz realize how far the relationship between Fanny and Napoleon II has progressed. Gentz then sends Fanny to Paris under the pretext that an interesting engagement is waiting for her there. They really want to keep the liaison between the two mismatched lovers under control.

Fanny absolutely doesn't want to let go of her lover, so Baron Gentz makes it clear to her that her introduction to the Duke of Reichstadt was nothing more than a political maneuver by the Viennese government. Fanny acquiesces and leaves the country for the French capital. In Paris she celebrates a great success with her art, but she cannot forget her loved one at home in distant Vienna. The Duke of Reichstadt feels the same way. He escapes his golden cage in Austria and rushes to Paris to see Fanny again. But their bliss is short-lived. In addition, the political unrest in France is increasing more and more. Napoleon Bonaparte's supporters demand that they take back power in the country. Although standing in his father's shadow, his son is willing to do so. But things don't go as planned. Napoleon II and Fanny attend a Bonapartist gathering, which is dissolved by the authorities. Baron Gentz sees that things are going awry and urges the Duke of Reichstadt to return to Vienna. Realizing that he has been used as a plaything by the competing powers, the young Duke succumbs to poor health and withers away, passing at the age of 21.

== Cast ==
- Lilian Harvey as Fanny Elssler
- Rolf Moebius as Duke of Reichstadt
- Willy Birgel as Hofrat Friedrich Gentz
- Paul Hoffmann as Metternich
- Liselotte Schaak as Therese Elssler, Fanny's sister
- Ernst Karchow as Dietrichstein
- Walter Werner as The Maestro Foresti
- Ernst Sattler as Kammerdiener Lindner
- Hubert von Meyerinck as Polizeipräfekt
- Werner Kepich as Französischer Revolutionär
- Hubert I. Stowitts as Der Prinz im Ballett
- Erwin Biegel
- Johannes Bergfeldt
- Angelo Ferrari
- André Saint-Germain
- Kurt Lenz
- Ruth Nimbach
- Anna von Palen
- Paul Rehkopf
- Bruno Ziener
- Wolf Dietrich
- Ulli Friese
- Charlie Albert Huber

== Bibliography ==
- Ascheid, Antje (2010) [2003]. Hitler's Heroines: Stardom and Womanhood in Nazi Cinema. Philadelphia: Temple University Press. ISBN 978-1-59213-843-2.
