= Karl Wilhelm Osterwald =

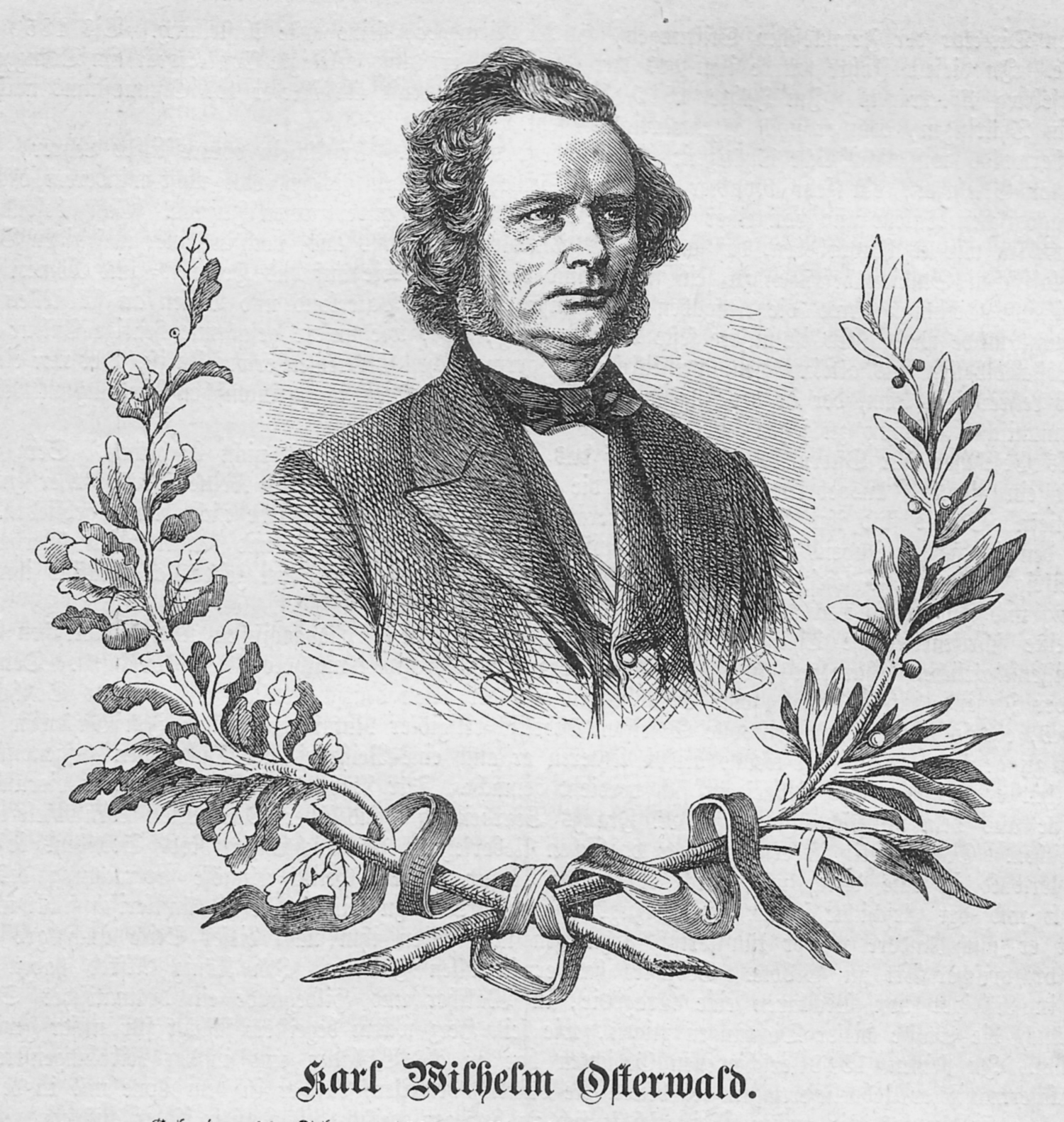
Karl Wilhelm Osterwald

Karl Wilhelm Osterwald (23 February 1820 in Bretsch (Altmark) – 27 March 1887 in Mühlhausen) was a German teacher, author, writer of Protestant church poetry and nature lover.

== Life ==
Osterwald studied at the Gymnasium in Salzwedel and the Franckesche Stiftungen in Halle an der Saale. He studied philology at the University of Halle and was later active as a teacher at the Königlichen Pädigogium in Halle and at the Domgymnasium in Merseburg. In 1865 he became headmaster of the Gymnasium in Mühlhausen.

During his period in Mühlhausen, he published many pedagogical writings and poems. Around 70 of his nature, travel, and love poems were set to music by composer Robert Franz. In 1889, his former student Richard von Hertwig pressed for the erection of a monument in his memory in the Mühlhäuser Stadtwald.

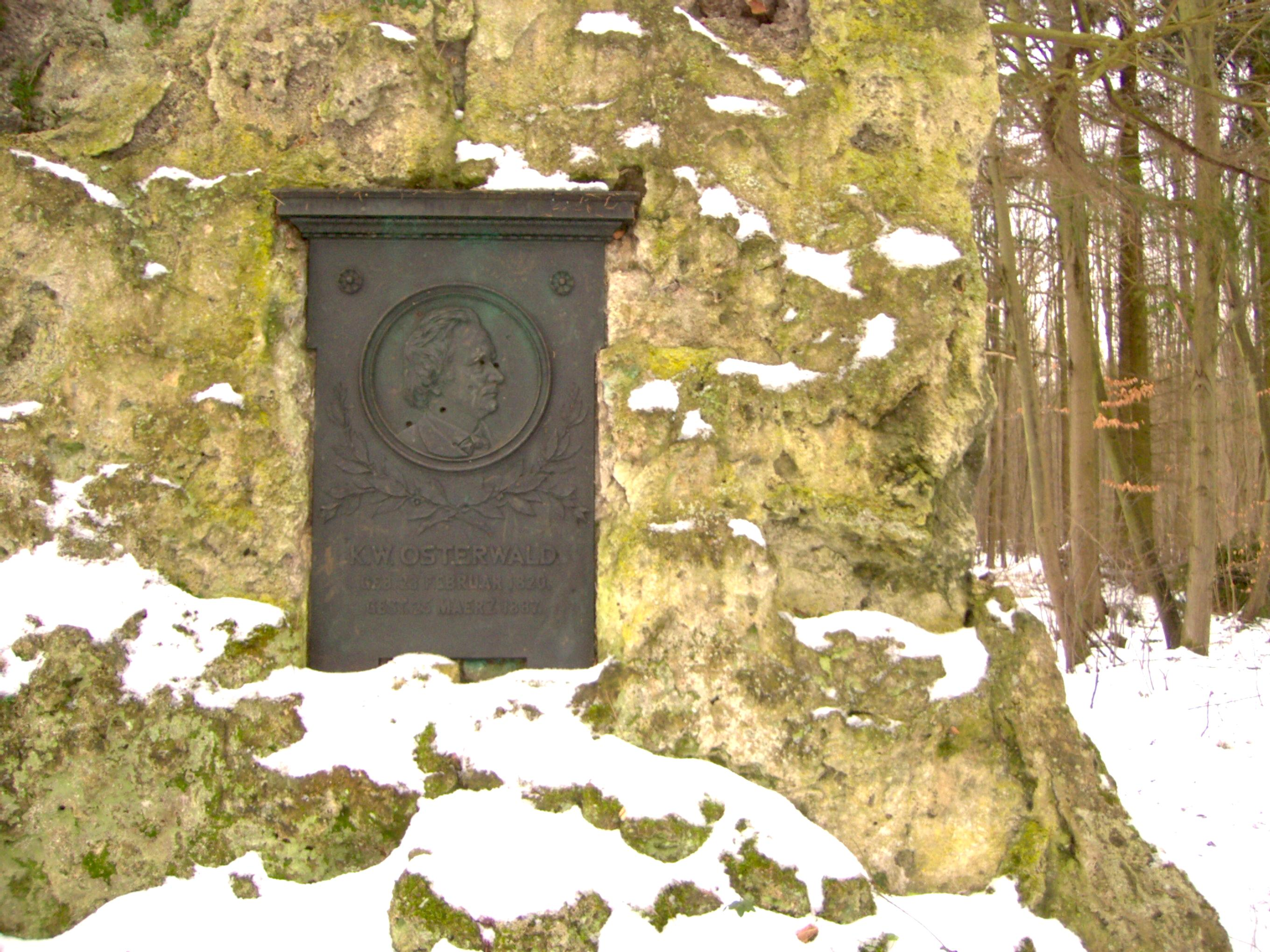
Monument of Karl Wilhelm Osterwald in Mühlhäuser Stadtwald

Osterwald, together with the cathedral organist Engel in Merseburg, prepared an edition of the Geistlichen Lieder of Johann Franck, providing new texts. Osterwald also wrote his own church songs. The Evangelical Lutheran hymnal of the early 20th century features his works including O du mein Trost und süßes Hoffen for Advent and Heilge Nacht, ich grüße dich for Christmas.

Osterward received the House Order of Hohenzollern.

== Works ==
- Im Grünen, Poetry collection, 1853.
- Im Freien, Poetry collection, 1862.
- Bleibt einig! Zeitgedichte, 1870.
- Deutschlands Auferstehung, 1871.
