= Friedrich Hollaender =

German composer (1896–1976)

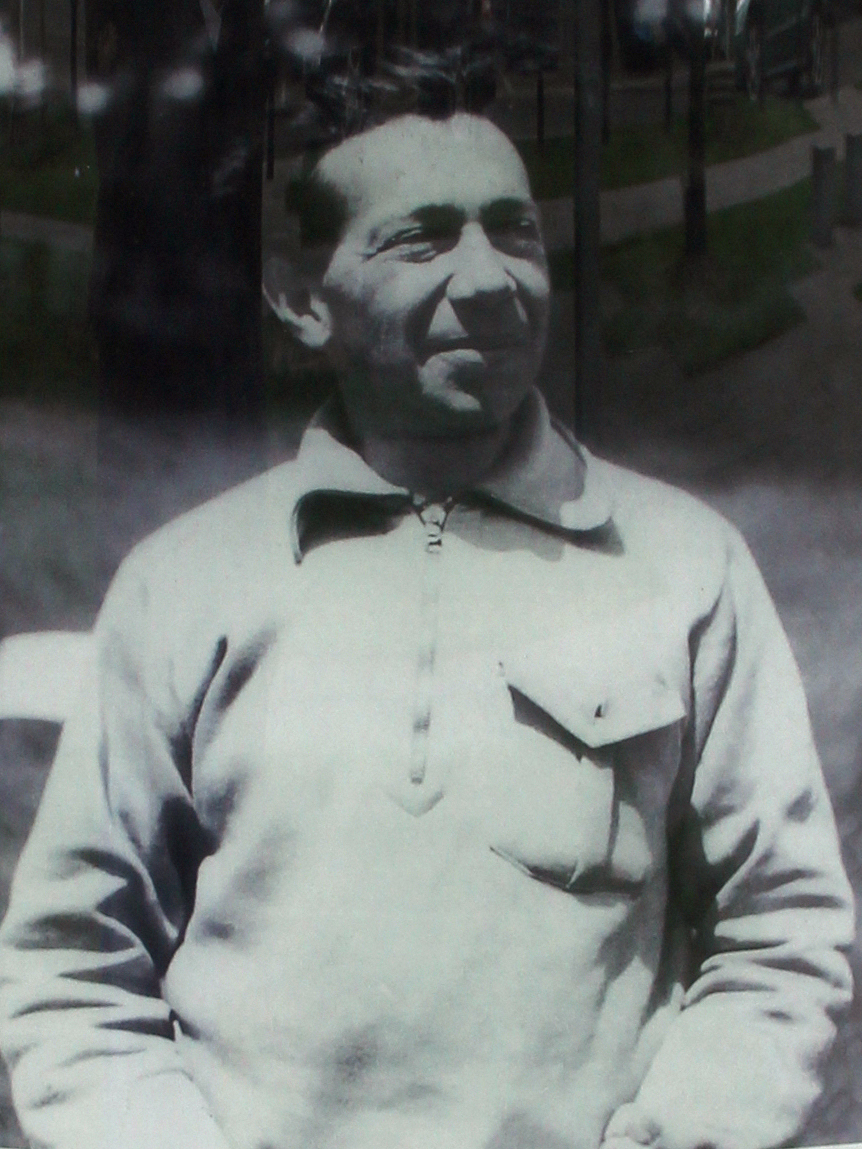
Friedrich Hollaender

Friedrich Hollaender (in exile also Frederick Hollander; 18 October 1896 – 18 January 1976) was a German film composer and author.

== Life and career ==
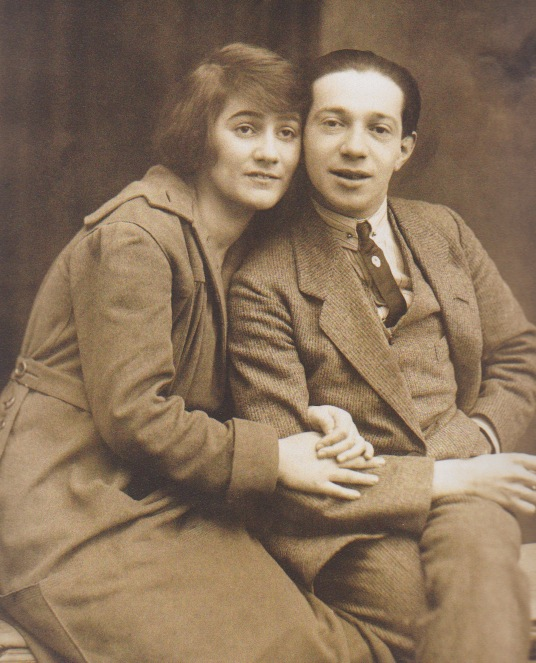
Hollaender with his first wife Blandine Ebinger in the 1920s

He was born in London to a Jewish family, where his father, operetta composer Victor Hollaender, worked as a musical director at the Barnum & Bailey Circus. Young Hollaender had a solid music and theatre family background: his uncle Gustav was director of the Stern Conservatory in Berlin, and his uncle Felix Hollaender was a well-known novelist and drama critic, who later worked with Max Reinhardt at the Deutsches Theater.

In 1899 Hollaender's family returned to Berlin. His father began teaching at the Stern Conservatory, where his son became a student in Engelbert Humperdinck's master class. In the evening he played the piano at silent film performances in local cinemas, developing the art of musical improvisation. By the age of 18 he was employed as a répétiteur at the New German Theatre in Prague and also was put in charge of troop entertainment at the Western Front of World War I.

Having finished his studies, he composed music for productions by Max Reinhardt and became involved in Berlin's Kabarett scene. Together with Kurt Tucholsky, Klabund, Walter Mehring, Mischa Spoliansky and Joachim Ringelnatz he worked in venues like Reinhardt's Schall und Rauch ensemble at the Großes Schauspielhaus or the Wilde Bühne led by Trude Hesterberg at the Theater des Westens in Charlottenburg, where he established the Tingel-Tangel-Theater cabaret in 1931.

In 1919 he married the actress Blandine Ebinger; the couple divorced in 1926. Their daughter Philine later became the wife of the cabarettist Georg Kreisler. Hollaender had his breakthrough when he wrote the film score for The Blue Angel (1930), including the most popular song "Falling in Love Again (Can't Help It)", performed by Marlene Dietrich. He later married Leza Lidow.

He had to leave Nazi Germany in 1933 because of his Jewish descent and first moved to Paris. He emigrated to the United States the next year, where he wrote the music for over a hundred films, including Destry Rides Again (1939), A Foreign Affair (1948), The 5,000 Fingers of Dr. T. (1953 Academy Award nomination) and Sabrina (1954). Many of his songs were again made famous by Marlene Dietrich. He can be seen as the piano accompanist in A Foreign Affair (on the songs "Black Market", "Illusions" and "Ruins of Berlin"). He received four Academy Award nominations for composition. As "Frederick Hollander", he also wrote the semi-autobiographical novel Those Torn From Earth, released in 1941, which details the flight from Germany that many Jewish members of the film industry embarked on after the Nazis came to power and instituted the Nuremberg Laws. He divorced Elizabeth Hollander in 1946 in Los Angeles.

In 1956 he returned to Germany and again worked for several years as a revue composer at the Theater Die Kleine Freiheit in Munich. He made a cameo appearance in Billy Wilder's film comedy One, Two, Three (1960) as a Kapellmeister leading a dance band and singing the German vocals to the song "Yes! We Have No Bananas".

Hollaender died 1976 in Munich and is buried in the Obergiesing Ostfriedhof.

== Selected songs ==
- 1926 "Raus mit den Männern", famous feminist song performed by Claire Waldoff.
- 1929 "Eine kleine Sehnsucht" ("A Little Longing") sung by Grete Mosheim.
- 1930 "Ich bin von Kopf bis Fuß auf Liebe eingestellt" w.m. (words and music) Hollander (with English words by Sammy Lerner became known as "Falling in Love Again (Can't Help It)"). Introduced by Marlene Dietrich in the film Der Blaue Engel.
- 1931 "Wenn ich mir was wünschen dürfte" in film Der Mann, der seinen Mörder sucht and in the 1974 film The Night Porter (Italian: Il Portiere di notte) by Liliana Cavani.
- 1935 "My Heart and I" w. Leo Robin. Introduced by Bing Crosby in the 1936 film Anything Goes
- 1936 "Awake in a Dream" w. Leo Robin. Introduced by Marlene Dietrich in the film Desire.
- 1936 "The House That Jack Built for Jill" w. Leo Robin. Introduced by Bing Crosby in the film Rhythm on the Range.
- 1936 "Moonlight and Shadows" w. Leo Robin. Introduced by Dorothy Lamour in the film The Jungle Princess.
- 1937 "Whispers in the Dark" w. Leo Robin. Introduced by Connie Boswell in the film Artists and Models
- 1937 "It's Raining Sunbeams" w. Sam Coslow. Introduced by Deanna Durbin in the film One Hundred Men and a Girl.
- 1937 "True Confession" w. Sam Coslow. Theme of the film True Confession.
- 1938 "You Leave Me Breathless" w. Ralph Freed. Introduced by Fred MacMurray in the film Cocoanut Grove.
- 1939 "Strange Enchantment" w. Frank Loesser. Introduced by Dorothy Lamour in the film Man About Town.
- 1939 "See What the Boys in the Back Room Will Have" w. Frank Loesser. Introduced by Marlene Dietrich in the film Destry Rides Again.
- 1940 "I've Been in Love Before" w. Frank Loesser. Introduced by Marlene Dietrich in the film Seven Sinners.
- 1940 "Moon Over Burma" w. Frank Loesser. Introduced by Dorothy Lamour in the film Moon Over Burma.
- 1948 "Black Market" w.m. Hollander. Introduced by Marlene Dietrich in the film A Foreign Affair.
- 1948 "Illusions" w.m. Hollander. Introduced by Marlene Dietrich in the film A Foreign Affair.
- 1948 "The Ruins of Berlin" w.m. Hollander. Introduced by Marlene Dietrich in the film A Foreign Affair.
- 1955 "Sentimental Moments" w. Ralph Freed. Introduced by Joan Bennett in the film We're No Angels.

== Published CD-ROMs ==
Friedrich Hollaender: ...Ich bin von Kopf bis Fuss auf Musik eingestellt, 4 CDs with 20 pages Booklet, Membran Music Ltd., 2005; Distributed by Grosser und Stein GmbH, Pforzheim, ISBN 3-86562-044-2.

== Selected filmography ==
- Prince Cuckoo (1919)
- The Woman's Crusade (1926)
- Burglars (1930)
- Road to Rio (1931)
- The Fate of Renate Langen (1931)
- Three Days of Love (1931)
- Caught in the Act (1931)
- The Man in Search of His Murderer (1931, actor)
- The Yellow House of Rio (1931)
- Storms of Passion (1932)
- The Empress and I (1933)
- The Only Girl (1933)
- Forgotten Faces (1936)
- A Son Comes Home (1936)
- Here Comes Mr. Jordan (1941)
- Background to Danger (1943)
- The 5,000 Fingers of Dr. T. (1953)
