= Aenne Willkomm =

German costume designer

- Born: 17 June 1902; Shanghai, China
- Died: 20 June 1979 (aged 77); Hamburg, Germany
- Other names: Änne Willkomm, Aenne Kettelhut (after marriage)
- Occupation: Costume designer
- Spouse: Erich Kettelhut

Aenne Willkomm (17 June 1902 – 20 June 1979), later Aenne Kettelhut, was a German costume designer, born in Shanghai. She worked in German silent films in the 1920s, including as costume designer on Metropolis (1927).

== Early life ==
Willkomm was born in Shanghai to European parents in 1902.

== Career ==
Willkomm worked in the fashion industry before she worked with designer Heinrich Umlauff on Fritz Lang's two-part film epic, Die Nibelungen (1924). She became head of UFA-GmbH's costuming department on the strength of her work on that first assignment. She went on to work with Lang on Metropolis, for which she designed and oversaw "literally thousands" of Bauhaus-inspired "futuristic" costumes, including for the film's main character, Maria, played by Brigitte Helm. She often clashed with the demanding Lang on the set of Metropolis. She worked on a few other films, including My Leopold (1924), Sister Veronika (1926), and Der Katzensteg (1927, based on the novel by Hermann Sudermann).

== Personal life ==
Willkomm retired from film and by 1931 married her colleague, production designer Erich Kettelhut. She died in Hamburg in 1979, aged 77 years.
