= Harlip =

Harlip was a photographic studio specialising in celebrity portraits, based at 161 New Bond Street, Mayfair, London, England and run by Dr Gregory Harlip, and later his widow Madame Monte Harlip, née Rosa Hachnochi, both of Eastern European origin. He was born in Odessa, Russia, in 1893; she was from Ciechanowice in Poland (1898). Both families moved to Berlin later on. Dr. Harlip worked as a lawyer/businessman before (according to the marriage certificate from October 1929). Hachnochis first appeared in the Berlin address book in 1914. Her father built Kurfürstendamm 99 (destroyed in the war, today 100). Up until 1937, the "Atelier Harlip", as it was called in German, had been based at Kurfürstendamm 24 (now Lindners Hotel). Among their customers were actors and actresses like Lilian Harvey, Camilla Horn, and Dolly Haas; and opera singers Gitta Alpar and Jarmila Novotna.

In 1937, the Harlips left Berlin because of growing Nazi repressions against Jewish companies. One brother and sister of Mrs. Harlip perished in Auschwitz, another sister and brother escaped to Palestine, and one more sister to the U.S.

Up until 1937, the "Atelier Harlip", as it was called in German, had been based at Kurfürstendamm, Berlin. In 1937, the Harlips left Berlin because of growing Nazi repressions against Jewish companies.

After Dr Harlip's death on 7 April 1945, Madame Harlip continued the business as one of the great society photographers of the 1950s. Known for catchphrases to the sitter such as "Give me Rembrandt", her ingredients for a good portrait were "life, honesty of expression, simplicity". She lived at Stanmore, Middlesex, and died in 1982.
