= The Heart on the Rhine =

1925 film

- Directed by: Heinrich Lisson
- Written by: Hans Felsing
- Produced by: Georg Enders
- Starring: Camilla Spira
- Cinematography: Willy Gaebel
- Production company: Georg Enders-Film
- Release date: 7 September 1925
- Country: Germany
- Languages: Silent; German intertitles

The Heart on the Rhine (German: Das Herz am Rhein) is a 1925 German silent film directed by Heinrich Lisson and starring Camilla Spira.

The film's sets were designed by the art director Jacek Rotmil.

== Cast ==
- Heinz Ludwig as Schneider Fips
- Albert Maurer as Maler Andreas
- Hertha Müller as Tochter Bärbel
- Mizzi Schütz as Mutter Pummel
- Camilla Spira
- Gustav Zeitzschel

== Bibliography ==
- Parish, Robert. Film Actors Guide. Scarecrow Press, 1977.
