= Willy Zeyn (editor) =

German film editor and producer

- Born: 12 March 1907; Kiel, German Empire
- Died: 17 February 1983 (aged 75)
- Occupations: Editor, Producer
- Years active: 1930-1967 (film)

Willy Zeyn (12 March 1907 – 17 February 1983) was a German film editor and producer. He was the son of the silent film director Willy Zeyn.

== Selected filmography ==
=== Editor ===
- Darling of the Gods (1930)
- Her Grace Commands (1931)
- Princess, At Your Orders! (1931)
- Caught in the Act (1931)
- Bombs on Monte Carlo (1931)
- A Blonde Dream (1932)
- Waltz War (1933)
- Court Waltzes (1933)
- The Island (1934)
- Decoy (1934)
- The Girlfriend of a Big Man (1934)
- The Decoy (1935)
- The Old and the Young King (1935)
- Intermezzo (1936)
- The Tiger of Eschnapur (1938)
- The Indian Tomb (1938)
- The Barber of Seville (1938)
- The Song of Aixa (1939)
- Sighs of Spain (1939)
- The Fox of Glenarvon (1940)
- Everything for Gloria (1941)
- My Life for Ireland (1941)
- That Was My Life (1944)

=== Producer ===
- Trouble Backstairs (1949)
- Hanna Amon (1951)
- The Chaplain of San Lorenzo (1953)
- I and You (1953)
- Street Serenade (1953)
- A Woman of Today (1954)
- Guitars of Love (1954)
- Santa Lucia (1956)
- The Girl with the Cat's Eyes (1958)
- The Blue Sea and You (1959)
- A Thousand Stars Aglitter (1959)
- Brandenburg Division (1960)
- I Learned That in Paris (1960)
- The Legion's Last Patrol (1962)
- St. Pauli Between Night and Morning (1967)

== Bibliography ==
- Gerd Gemünden. A Foreign Affair: Billy Wilder's American Films. Berghahn Books, 2008.
