= Marika Rökk =

Hungarian-born actress, singer and dancer (1913–2004)

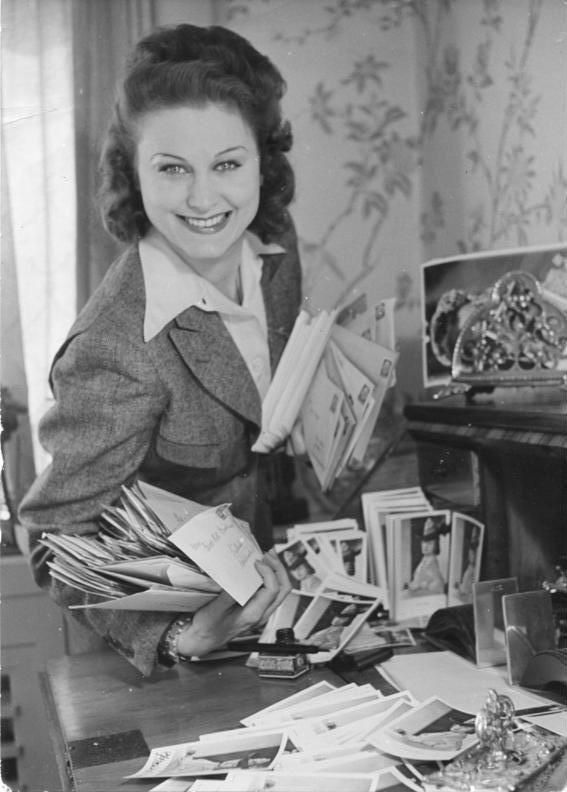
- Rökk with fan mail, c. 1940
- Born: Marie Karoline Rökk; 3 November 1913; Cairo, Khedivate of Egypt
- Died: 16 May 2004 (aged 90); Baden bei Wien, Austria
- Occupations: Dancer; singer; actress
- Years active: 1930–1986
- Spouses: Georg Jacoby (m. 1940; died 1964) Fred Raul (m. 1968; died 1985)
- Children: Gabriele Jacoby

Marika Rökk (German: [ma.ˈʁiː.ka ˈʁœk]; born Marie Karoline Rökk, 3 November 1913 – 16 May 2004) was a German-Austrian dancer, singer and actress of Hungarian descent who gained prominence in German films in the Nazi era. She resumed her career in 1947 and was one of Europe's most famous operetta singers, performing onstage until 1986.

== Life and work ==
Marie Karoline Rökk was born in 1913 in Cairo, Egypt, the daughter of Hungarian architect and contractor Eduard Rökk and his wife, Maria Karoline Charlotte (born Karoly) Rökk. She spent her childhood in Budapest, but in 1924 her family moved to Paris where her father had been contractually engaged. Here she learned to dance and starred with the Hoffmann Girls at the Moulin Rouge cabaret.

After a tour that led her to Broadway she continued her dance training in the United States, where she worked with Ned Wayburn. In 1929 she returned to Europe and the next year acted in her first film, Why Sailors Leave Home, a British comedy directed by Monty Banks, starring Leslie Fuller.

She made her real breakthrough when the Universum Film AG (UFA) attempted to create a German film star to rival Hollywood's top musical star actresses Eleanor Powell, Ginger Rogers and later, Alice Faye, Rita Hayworth and Betty Grable. The Third Reich's Minister of Propaganda, Joseph Goebbels, admired Hollywood movies and examined them carefully in regular private screenings. Early Technicolor films such as Becky Sharp (1935), The Garden of Allah (1936), Nothing Sacred (1937), and A Star Is Born (1937) made him realize that Hollywood feature films presented a threat to Germany's internal market and that Hollywood's dominance of colour and musical film technology should be matched, at least if Germany was serious about engaging in a cultural war with the U.S. and Britain.

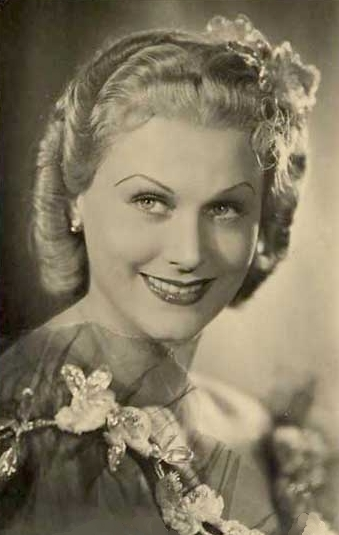
Rökk in 1939

As an acclaimed revue dancer on numerous European stages, Rökk was selected as the ideal candidate to be groomed and promoted as this new type of star and in 1934 was offered a two-year contract with UFA, where she became one of the most prolific film stars of the time. Rökk's German film debut was Leichte Kavallerie (Light Cavalry) (1935, Werner Hochbaum) with Heinz von Cleve. The film made her a sensation overnight.

It was the first of a series of modern escapist, lightweight operettas and glittering revue-style entertainments which quickly made Rökk one of Germany's most popular actresses. These films were clearly modeled on the successful formula of the black-and-white and Technicolor musical films being produced by American film studios RKO, Metro-Goldwyn-Mayer and 20th Century Fox in the 1930s and 1940s.

She had the technical skill and glamour to carry off the formulaic plots and dialogue and provide German audiences with a home grown star to rival the popular American actresses. Der Bettelstudent and Gasparone, followed by Hello Janine! in 1939, all starred her together with Johannes Heesters and established them as the "dream couple" of the musical comedy genre. In her appearances she cultivated her magyar accent conveying a notion of "paprika" exoticism. Her films, which were not overtly political, were also popular in wider parts of Europe.

With a double role in Kora Terry, a 1940 film directed by her future husband Georg Jacoby, she reached new heights. By simultaneously impersonating dutiful and evil twin sisters, Rökk was able to showcase her range of theatrical talent, performing in several dance interludes which were quite risqué for that time. In the same year, she appeared in the propaganda film Wunschkonzert by Eduard von Borsody (as herself), followed by her performance in Georg Jacoby's lavish Women Are Better Diplomats (Frauen sind doch bessere Diplomaten, UFA's first Agfacolor motion picture) in 1941, together with Willy Fritsch.

She reached the peak of her career in 1944, with the star role in The Woman of My Dreams, a lavishly enacted musical colour film again directed by Jacoby. Though few of her movies featured overt Nazi propaganda, she fulfilled her mission to exemplify a leading woman in the Third Reich and to entertain the German people throughout World War II as intended by Goebbels. After the war, she initially was banned professionally (Berufsverbot) but was rehabilitated in 1947 and was able to continue her movie career in West Germany and Austria.

In 1948 she was among the first recipients of the German Bambi media award. Rökk became one of Europe's most famous operetta singers, performing onstage until 1986, including at the Raimund Theater in Vienna. After her husband Georg Jacoby had died in 1964, she was married to the Hungarian actor Fred Raul from 1968 until his death in 1985. She is the mother of actress Gabriele Jacoby.

In 1994, the son of Soviet spymaster Lavrentiy Beria alleged that Rökk aided Soviet intelligence during World War II, sending information from Goebbels to the Soviet Union. In 2017, German and British media reported on declassified documents that indicate Rökk may have had a role in Soviet intelligence during the war. Those reports were later described as "unfounded" by German newspaper Die Welt.

== Death ==
Rökk died of a heart attack in Baden bei Wien, Austria, in 2004, aged 90.

== Awards ==
- 1948, 1968, 1987, 1990, 1998 Bambi
- 1981 Deutscher Filmpreis, Special Award for Outstanding Contributions to German Cinema
- 1987 Bavarian Film Awards, Best Actress

== Filmography ==
- Why Sailors Leave Home (1930)
- Kiss Me Sergeant (1930)
- Kiss Me, Darling (1932)
- The Ghost Train (1933)
- Leichte Kavallerie (1935)
- Heißes Blut (1936)
- The Beggar Student (1936)
- Und du mein Schatz fährst mit (1937)
- Carousel (1937)
- Gasparone (1937)
- Eine Nacht im Mai (1938)
- Tanzendes Herz (1939)
- Vadrózsa (1939)
- The Life and Loves of Tschaikovsky (1939)
- Hello Janine! (1939)
- Kora Terry (1940)
- Wunschkonzert (1940)
- Zirkusblut (1940)
- Frauen sind doch bessere Diplomaten (1941)
- Tanz mit dem Kaiser (1941)
- Love Me (1942)
- The Woman of My Dreams (1944)
- Fregola (1948)
- Child of the Danube (1950)
- Sensation in San Remo (1951)
- The Csardas Princess (1951)
- Mask in Blue (1953)
- The Divorcée (1953)
- At the Green Cockatoo by Night (1957)
- Das gab's nur einmal (1958)
- Bühne frei für Marika (1958)
- The Night Before the Premiere (1959)
- My Husband, the Economic Miracle (1961)
- Heute gehn wir bummeln (1961)
- Wedding Night in Paradise (1962)
- Die Fledermaus (1962)
- Die Schöngrubers (1972) (TV series) (13 episodes)
- Der letzte Walzer (1973)
- Schloß Königswald (1988)
