= Women Are Better Diplomats =

1941 film

- Directed by: Georg Jacoby
- Screenplay by: Karl Georg Külb
- Story by: Karl Georg Külb
- Based on: Frauen sind doch bessere Diplomaten by Hans Flemming
- Produced by: Max Pfeiffer
- Cinematography: Konstantin Irmen-Tschet; Alexander von Lagorio
- Edited by: Erich Kobler; Margret Noell
- Music by: Franz Grothe; Willy Dehmel
- Production company: UFA
- Distributed by: UFA
- Release date: 31 October 1941 (Germany)
- Running time: 93 minutes
- Country: Germany
- Language: German
- Budget: 2.4 million ℛ︁ℳ︁
- Box office: 7.9 million ℛ︁ℳ︁

Women Are Better Diplomats (German: Frauen sind doch bessere Diplomaten) is a 1941 German musical comedy film from the Nazi era. Directed by Georg Jacoby and starring Marika Rökk, Willy Fritsch and Aribert Wäscher. It was based on a novel by Hans Flemming. The film was the first German feature film to be made in colour, and was one of the most expensive films produced during the Third Reich. The film met with a positive public response and was among the most popular German films of the early war years.

== Plot ==
A dancer named Marie-Luise Pally is sent on a diplomatic mission to the Frankfurt Parliament in an attempt to stop her uncle's casino in Homburg shutting down. The film is set in the German revolutions of 1848–1849.

== Cast ==
- Marika Rökk as Marie-Luise Pally
- Willy Fritsch as Rittmeister von Karstein
- Aribert Wäscher as Der Landgraf
- Hans Leibelt as Geheimrat Berger
- Ursula Herking as Mariechen
- Herbert Hübner as Dr. Schuster
- Carl Kuhlmann as Paul Lamberg - Direktor des Spielcasinos Homburg
- Georg Alexander as Viktor Sugorsky
- Leo Peukert as Der Bürgermeister
- Erika von Thellmann as Seine Frau
- Karl Günther as Der General
- Rudolf Carl as Karl, Bursche des Rittmeisters von Karstein
- Edith Oß as Annette
- Rolf Heydel as Hanussen
- Käte Kühl as Frau Lamberg
- Erich Fiedler as Kellner

== Production ==
The production period for Women Are Better Diplomats was both long and expensive, as the production team encountered various difficulties during the making of the film. It took longer to produce than any other Universum Film AG (Ufa) production, with a gap of more than two years between the start of filming in July 1939 and its debut screening in October 1941. The delays prompted the cast to joke that "When the film is done, the war will be over too". These delays also increased the cost of the production. The original budget was 1.45 million ℛ︁ℳ︁, but the final production cost was actually 2.4 million ℛ︁ℳ︁, making it the thirteenth most expensive film produced during the Third Reich.

Many of the delays in production stemmed from the fact that Women Are Better Diplomats was the first German feature film to be shot in colour. The colour process used was Agfacolor, which had recently been developed as a German alternative to Technicolor. As filming in Agfacolor was still new, frequent improvements were made to the process during the film's production, prompting the re-shooting of scenes to enhance the reproduction of colours. Lead actress Marika Rökk recalled that "If we thought we had finished a scene, some revoltingly gifted technician would come up with an idea for improving it". Outdoor scenes were particularly problematic: one dance scene filmed in Babelsberg Park, for example, had to be re-filmed a number of times due to the grass appearing as blue or red rather than green, depending on the sun's position.

A further 500,000 ℛ︁ℳ︁ was added to the production cost when Karel Štěpánek, who had originally been cast for the part of Oberleutnant Keller, fled to London after the initial conclusion of filming and performed on radio there. This led to him being blacklisted by the Propaganda Ministry, and he had to be replaced by Erich Fiedler, with the relevant scenes being re-shot.

The film was one of many musical productions that featured a partnership between director Georg Jacoby and actress Marika Rökk. They had previously worked together on Hot Blood (1936), The Beggar Student (1936), Gasparone (1937) and A Night in May (1938). Jacoby and Rökk married each other in 1940, during the production of Women Are Better Diplomats.

== Release and reception ==
The film's premiere was on 31 October 1941. Propaganda Minister Joseph Goebbels was not pleased with the results, but the film met with a positive public response. It was the third most popular film released in Germany between 1940 and 1942, behind Die Grosse Liebe (1942) and Wunschkonzert (1940). In the next three years, the film's takings were around 7.9 million ℛ︁ℳ︁.
