= Gasparone (film) =

1937 film

- German film poster
- Directed by: Georg Jacoby
- Written by: Friedrich Zell (libretto); Werner Eplinius; Hans Leip; Rudo Ritter
- Based on: Gasparone by Carl Millöcker
- Produced by: Max Pfeiffer
- Starring: Marika Rökk; Johannes Heesters; Heinz Schorlemmer
- Cinematography: Konstantin Irmen-Tschet
- Edited by: Carl Otto Bartning
- Music by: Peter Kreuder
- Production company: UFA
- Distributed by: UFA
- Release date: 17 December 1937
- Running time: 80 minutes
- Country: Germany
- Language: German

Gasparone is a 1937 German musical comedy film directed by Georg Jacoby and starring Marika Rökk, Johannes Heesters and Heinz Schorlemmer. It is based on the operetta Gasparone by Carl Millöcker with a libretto by F Zell and Richard Genée. It was shot at the Babelsberg Studios and on location in Croatia. The film's sets were designed by the art director Erich Kettelhut. It premiered at the Ufa-Palast am Zoo in Berlin.

== Cast ==
- Marika Rökk as Ita
- Johannes Heesters as Erminio Bondo
- Heinz Schorlemmer as Sindulfo
- Edith Schollwer as Carlotta
- Oskar Sima as Massaccio
- Leo Slezak as Nasoni
- Rudolf Platte as Benozzo
- Elsa Wagner as Zenobia
- Ursula Herking as Sora
- Arnim Suessenguth as Jucundus
- Ernst Behmer as Sokrates
- Erwin Biegel as man with white clove
- Erich Kestin as adjutant to the Police Prefect
- Paul Schwed as police captain

== Bibliography ==
- Bock, Hans-Michael; Bergfelder, Tim, eds. (2009). The Concise Cinegraph: Encyclopaedia of German Cinema. New York: Berghahn Books. ISBN 978-1-57181-655-9.
