= Willy Fritsch =

German-Silesian actor (1901-1973)

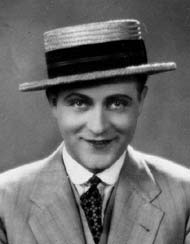
- Fritsch in 1927
- Born: Wilhelm Egon Fritz Fritsch; 27 January 1901; Kattowitz, German Empire
- Died: 13 July 1973 (aged 72); Hamburg, West Germany
- Occupation: Actor
- Years active: 1921–1964
- Spouse: Dinah Grace (m. 1937; died 1963)
- Children: 2, including Thomas Fritsch

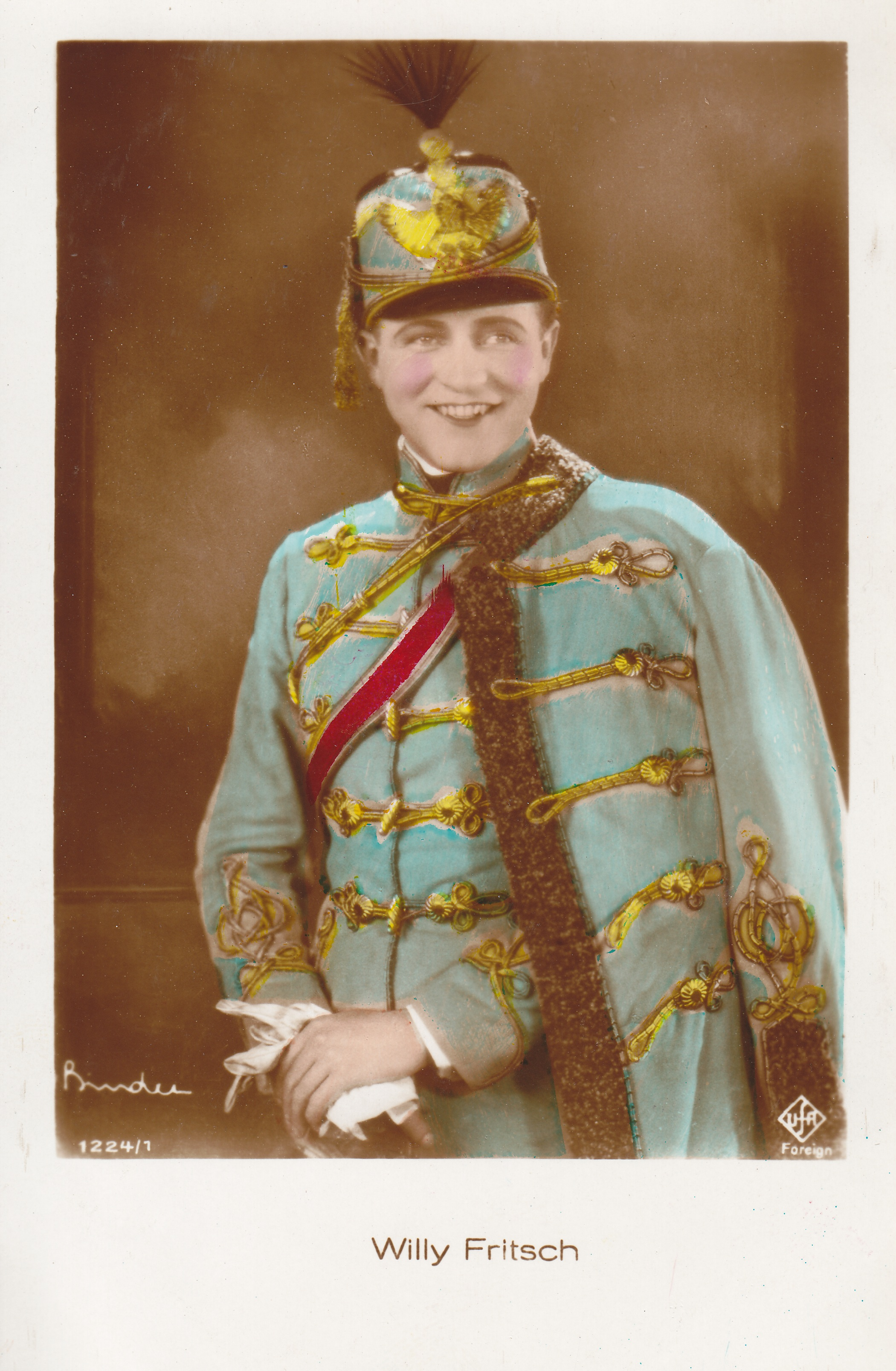
Willy Fritsch photographed by Alexander Binder, 1920s. Collection EYE Film Institute Netherlands.

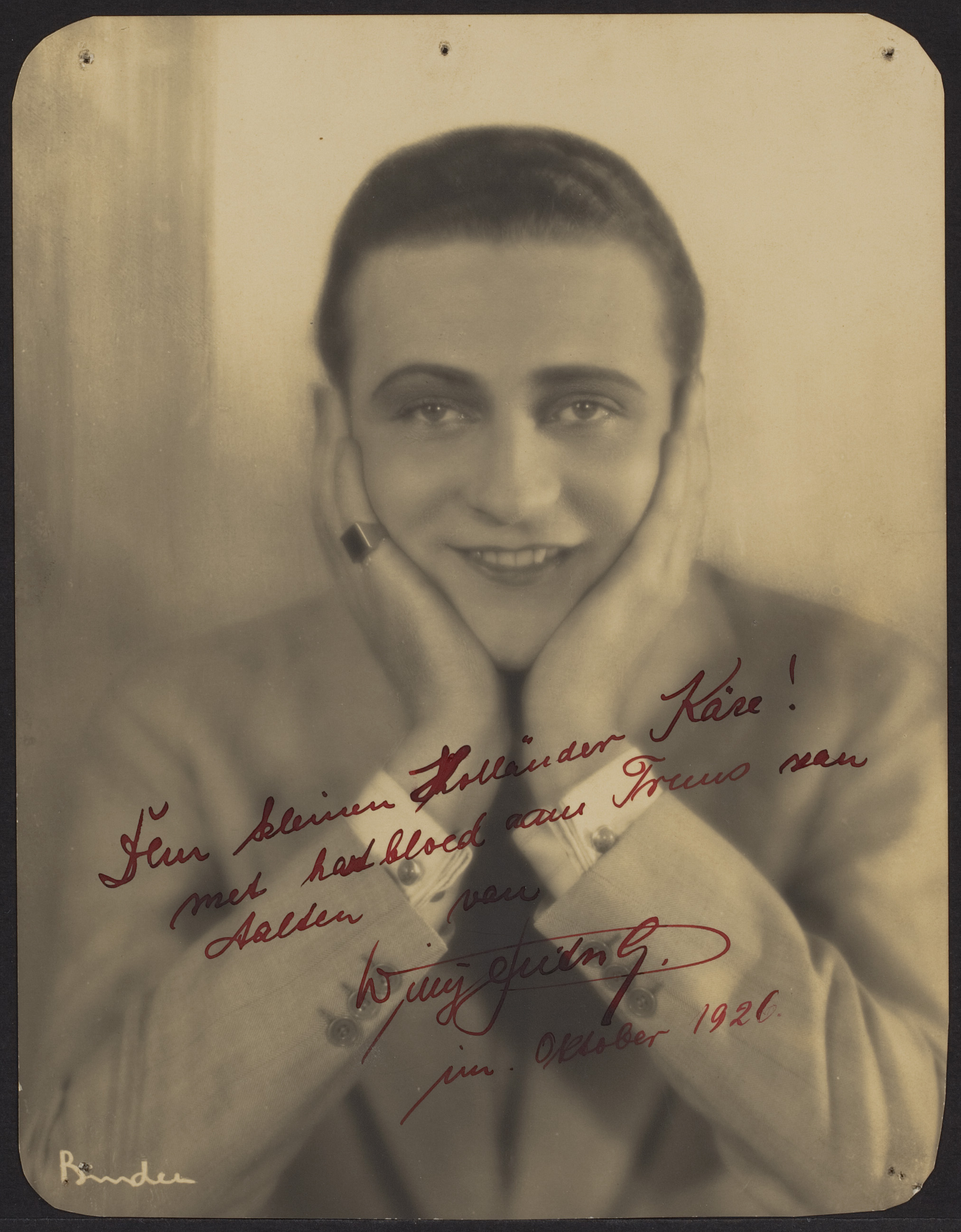
Willy Fritsch photographed by Alexander Binder, 1920s. Collection EYE Film Institute Netherlands.

Willy Fritsch (born Wilhelm Egon Fritz, 27 January 1901 – 13 July 1973) was a German theatre and film actor, a popular leading man and character actor from the silent-film era to the early 1960s.

== Biography ==
=== Early life ===
He was born Wilhelm Egon Fritz Fritsch, as the only son of a factory owner in the Upper Silesian city of Kattowitz (present-day Katowice) in the Prussian province of Silesia. After the bankruptcy of his father in 1912, the family moved to Berlin, where Fritsch Sr. worked as an employee of the Siemens-Schuckert company. Young Willy originally planned an apprenticeship as a mechanic, but soon began working as an extra at the Großes Schauspielhaus theatre.

=== 1919–1932 ===
From 1919 he attended Max Reinhardt's drama school at the Deutsches Theater, where he debuted with small roles and played as understudy at times side by side with Marlene Dietrich (i.e. Spring Awakening). He made his feature debut in films as a supporting player in 1920's Miss Venus and got his first important engagement in His Mysterious Adventure three years later. In 1925, Fritsch gained international attention by playing the leading role in the silent film A Waltz Dream directed by Ludwig Berger. Afterwards he was offered a United Artists contract, but refused to move to the United States, being concerned about his limited English. His career was pushed now through the UFA film company by being cast as a juvenile lover in silent comedies such as Chaste Susanne (1926), The Last Waltz (1927), Hungarian Rhapsody (1928), and Her Dark Secret (1929). Fritsch also starred in two silent films directed by Fritz Lang: the thriller Spies (1928) and the sci-fi film Woman in the Moon (1929), where he played serious characters. Again, these films gained him international success.

In 1929, he spoke the first sentence in a German talkie: "I'm saving money to buy a horse!" (Melodie des Herzens / Melody of the Heart, 1929)). Shortly after that, he was paired again with Lilian Harvey, whom he had already played together with twice during the mid-1920s. Their joint musical love comedy Waltz of Love (1930) was such a huge success that its producer Erich Pommer decided to continue making films with the "perfect couple" Harvey/Fritsch. Thereupon, they appeared regularly together in UFA movies such as The Three from the Filling Station (1930), Congress Dances by Erik Charell (1931) and A Blonde Dream (1932), but Fritsch was also playing in several movies at the side of Käthe von Nagy (i.e. in Billy Wilder's screenwriting debut Her Grace Commands, 1931 or I by Day, You by Night, 1932). He mainly starred in the German versions and was sometimes replaced by Henri Garat unless his movies were dubbed. In his musical comedies, Fritsch also turned out to be a good singer performing popular German film songs written by Werner Richard Heymann or Friedrich Holländer.

At the end of the Weimar era, he was one of the best paid actors in Germany, drawing large crowds of fans wherever he appeared. Even palm court music was composed for him: Ich bin in Willy Fritsch verliebt (I'm In Love With Willy Fritsch), 1931. Besides, Friedrich Holländer dedicated a Couplet to him the same year: Gebet einer 15 3/4-Jährigen - Warum ist der Willy Fritsch so schön? (Prayer Of A 15 3/4 Year Old: Why Willy Fritsch Is Such A Cutie) was written for the opening of the famous Tingel Tangel Theater in Berlin.

=== 1933–1945 ===
When Hitler came to power in 1933, Fritsch was able to continue his career in Germany. In the mid-1930s, he was the leading actor in highly successful comedies such as Amphitryon (1935) directed by Reinhold Schünzel or Lucky Kids (1936, director Paul Martin), the latter a German adaption of Frank Capra's film It Happened One Night. By the end of the decade, he starred in two more comedies together with Lilian Harvey (Seven Slaps, 1937 and Woman At The Wheel, 1939) before Harvey emigrated to France. In 1940, Fritsch also played the leading role in the first German coloured motion picture Women Are Better Diplomats.

Though he had joined the NSDAP in response to the pressure put on him to do so, Fritsch avoided getting involved in Nazi propaganda, other than his appearance in the 1944 aviator movie Junge Adler which earned him an entry on Goebbels' Gottbegnadeten list. Starring in Austrian originated comedies such as Vienna Blood (1942) directed by Willi Forst or A Salzburg Comedy (1943) written by Erich Kästner, he managed to survive the Hitler era without any loss of prestige, even while being watched by the secret police (Gestapo) for his "lack of political reliability" despite his party membership.

=== 1945–1964 ===
After the war, he moved to Hamburg and continued to appear in movies such as Film Without a Title (1948) together with Hildegard Knef, as well as in several German blockbusters such as The Heath Is Green (1951) and When the White Lilacs Bloom Again (1953) side by side with young Romy Schneider. In 1958, Fritsch starred in Sin Began with Eve, which was later adapted and filled with additional scenes by Francis Ford Coppola for his debut release of The Bellboy and the Playgirls (1962). Fritsch's final film was 1964's I Learned It from Father directed by Axel von Ambesser, in which he performed together with his son Thomas.

== Personal life ==
Fritsch was married to artistic dancer Dinah Grace in 1937 until her death from breast cancer in 1963 and they had two sons. The younger one, Thomas Fritsch, was a successful actor as well.

Fritsch died in Hamburg on 13 July 1973 of a heart attack at the age of 72 and was buried at Ohlsdorf Cemetery.

== Filmography ==
=== Silent films ===
- Miss Venus (1921)
- Raid (1921)
- Die kleine Midinette (1921)
- The Marriage Swindler (1922)
- The Stowaway (1922)
- Hallig Hooge (1923)
- His Mysterious Adventure (1923)
- The Journey to Happiness (1923)
- Mother and Child (1924)
- Guillotine (1924)
- Express Train of Love (1925)
- The Farmer from Texas (1925)
- Dancing Mad (1925)
- A Waltz Dream (1925)
- The Girl with a Patron (1925)
- The Wooing of Eve (1926)
- The Prince and the Dancer (1926)
- The Boxer's Bride (1926)
- Chaste Susanne (1926)
- A Sister of Six (1926)
- The Last Waltz (1927)
- His Late Excellency (1927)
- The Woman in the Cupboard (1927)
- Guilty (1928)
- Spies (1928)
- Because I Love You (1928)
- Docks of Hamburg (1928)
- Hungarian Rhapsody (1928)
- Her Dark Secret (1929)
- Woman in the Moon (1929)

=== Sound films ===
- Melody of the Heart (1929)
- Waltz of Love (1930)
- Hocuspocus (1930)
- The Three from the Filling Station (1930)
- Burglars (1930)
- Her Grace Commands (1931)
- In the Employ of the Secret Service (1931)
- Der Kongress tanzt (1931)
- Ronny (1931)
- The Cheeky Devil (1932)
- A Mad Idea (1932)
- A Blonde Dream (1932)
- I by Day, You by Night (1932)
- Season in Cairo (1933)
- Waltz War (1933)
- Young Dessau's Great Love (1933)
- Die Töchter Ihrer Exzellenz (1934)
- The Island (1934)
- Prinzessin Turandot (1934)
- Amphitryon (1935)
- Black Roses (1935)
- Boccaccio (1936)
- Lucky Kids (1936)
- Men Without a Fatherland (1937)
- Seven Slaps (1937)
- Gewitterflug zu Claudia (1937)
- Between the Parents (1938)
- The Girl of Last Night (1938)
- By a Silken Thread (1938)
- A Prussian Love Story (1938)
- Woman at the Wheel (1939)
- Die Geliebte (1939)
- Streit um den Knaben Jo (1939)
- Die unvollkommene Liebe (1940)
- Die keusche Geliebte (1940)
- Das leichte Mädchen (1940)
- Thrice Wed (1941)
- Frauen sind doch bessere Diplomaten (1941)
- Leichte Muse (1941)
- Vienna Blood (1942)
- Attack on Baku (1942)
- Beloved World (1942)
- A Salzburg Comedy (1943)
- Liebesgeschichten (1943)
- Die Gattin (1943)
- Junge Adler (1944)
- Die Fledermaus (1944–1946)
- Film Without A Title (1948)
- Finale (1948)
- Hallo - Sie haben Ihre Frau vergessen (1948)
- Twelve Hearts for Charly (1949)
- Derby (1949)
- Schatten in der Nacht (1949)
- Kätchen für alles (1949)
- The Beautiful Galatea (1950)
- Wonderful Times (1950)
- Mädchen mit Beziehungen (1950)
- King for One Night (1950)
- You Have to be Beautiful (1951)
- Maya of the Seven Veils (1951)
- The Heath is Green (1951)
- The Dubarry (1951)
- Mikosch Comes In (1952)
- Holiday From Myself (1952)
- At the Well in Front of the Gate (1952)
- We'll Talk About Love Later (1953)
- Lady's Choice (1953)
- When the White Lilacs Bloom Again (1953)
- Hungarian Rhapsody (1954)
- At the Order of the Czar (1954)
- Maxie (1954)
- Walking Back into the Past (1954)
- The Star of Rio (1955)
- Three Days Confined to Barracks (1955)
- The Happy Wanderer (1955)
- Love Is Just a Fairytale (1955)
- The Three from the Filling Station (1955)
- Black Forest Melody (1956)
- Where the Ancient Forests Rustle (1956)
- Das Donkosakenlied (1956)
- As Long as the Roses Bloom (1956)
- Der schräge Otto (1956)
- Two Hearts in May (1958)
- Black Forest Cherry Schnapps (1958)
- Tunis Top Secret (1959)
- Sin Began with Eve (1958)
- Hunting Party (1959)
- Sweetheart of the Gods (1960)
- Wenn die Heide blüht (1960)
- What Is Father Doing in Italy? (1961)
- Isola Bella (1961)
- Der Himmel kann warten (TV, 1962)
- Jazz und Jux in Heidelberg / Verliebt in Heidelberg (1963)
- Rauf und runter (TV, 1964)
- I Learned It from Father (1964)

== In popular media ==
In Quentin Tarantino's 2009 film Inglourious Basterds, Lilian Harvey's duet with Willy Fritsch from the 1936 film Lucky Kids, "Ich wollt' ich wär ein Huhn" ("I wish I was a chicken") can be heard playing on a phonograph in the basement scene "La Louisiane" as well as in the extended scene "Lunch With Goebbels", as Joseph Goebbels (Sylvester Groth) happily sings a portion of the song after deciding to hold a private screening of the film. After the screening, cinema owner Shosanna Dreyfus (Mélanie Laurent), under the alias "Emmanuelle Mimieux", comments on liking Lilian Harvey in the film—to which an irritated Goebbels angrily insists her name never be mentioned again in his presence. The song as performed by the Comedian Harmonists remains popular in Germany to this day.

== Literature ==
- Heike Goldbach: Ein Feuerwerk an Charme – Willy Fritsch. Der Ufa-Schauspieler. Über eine große Filmkarriere in wechselhaften Zeiten. tredition, Hamburg 2017, ISBN 978-3-7439-1290-8. Second, expanded and revised edition published at tredition, Ahrensburg 2026, ISBN 978-3-384-79412-3.
