= I by Day, You by Night =

1932 film

- Directed by: Ludwig Berger
- Written by: Robert Liebmann; Hans Székely
- Produced by: Erich Pommer
- Starring: Käthe von Nagy; Willy Fritsch
- Cinematography: Friedl Behn-Grund
- Edited by: Viktor Gertler; Heinz G. Janson
- Music by: Werner R. Heymann
- Production company: UFA
- Distributed by: UFA
- Release date: 29 November 1932
- Running time: 98 minutes
- Country: Weimar Republic
- Language: German

I by Day, You by Night (German: Ich bei Tag und du bei Nacht) is a 1932 German musical comedy film directed by Ludwig Berger and starring Käthe von Nagy and Willy Fritsch. It was shot at the Babelsberg Studios and on location at the Sanssouci Palace in Potsdam. The film's sets were designed by the art director Otto Hunte. It premiered in Berlin on 29 November 1932.

As was common at the time, separate English and French-language versions were released, both directed by Berger. The British version Early to Bed was co-produced with Gaumont British. The plot is very similar to the 1933 American film, Rafter Romance and its 1937 remake, Living on Love, though these films are based on a 1932 novel also named "Rafter Romance".

== Plot ==
Greta, a manicurist, and Hans, a waiter, share the same room which he uses in the day and she at night due to their different working hours. Although they have never met, they strongly dislike one another. However, when they meet at last, they fall in love when they realise each other's identity.

== Cast ==
- Käthe von Nagy as Grete
- Willy Fritsch as Hans
- Amanda Lindner as Cornelia Seidelbast
- Julius Falkenstein as Herr Krüger
- Elisabeth Lennartz as Trude Krüger
- Albert Lieven as Wolf
- Friedrich Gnaß as Helmut
- Anton Pointner as Meyer
- Eugen Rex as Peschke
- Ida Wüst as Frau Waiser
- Ursula van Diemen as Filmdarstellerin
- Walther Ludwig as Filmdarsteller
- Helmut Forest as Straßensänger
- Carl Merznicht as Straßensänger
- Trude Lieske as Gretes Kollegin
- Gerhard Bienert as Polizist
- Karl Hellmer as Kellner
- Rudolf Platte as Kuchenkellner
- Werner Pledath as Geschäftsführer im 'Casanova'
- Leo Monosson as Sänger im 'Casanova'
- Comedian Harmonists as Themselves

== Bibliography ==
- Hardt, Ursula (1996). From Caligari to California: Erich Pommer's Life in the International Film Wars. Berghahn Books. ISBN 978-1-57181-930-7.
- Kreimeier, Klaus (1999). The Ufa Story: A History of Germany's Greatest Film Company, 1918–1945. University of California Press. ISBN 978-0-520-22069-0.
