= Happy Ever After (1932 film) =

1932 film

- Directed by: Paul Martin; Robert Stevenson
- Written by: Douglas Furber; Jack Hulbert; Walter Reisch; Billy Wilder
- Produced by: Erich Pommer
- Starring: Lilian Harvey; Jack Hulbert; Cicely Courtneidge; Sonnie Hale
- Cinematography: Otto Baecker; Konstantin Irmen-Tschet; Günther Rittau
- Music by: Werner R. Heymann; Gérard Jacobson
- Production companies: Gainsborough Pictures; UFA
- Distributed by: Woolf and Freedman Films
- Release date: 8 November 1932
- Running time: 86 minutes
- Countries: Germany; United Kingdom
- Language: English

Happy Ever After is a 1932 British-German musical film directed by Paul Martin and Robert Stevenson, and starring Lilian Harvey, Jack Hulbert, Cicely Courtneidge, Sonnie Hale, and Edward Chapman.

It was made as a co-production between the London-based Gainsborough Pictures and Germany's UFA. It was one of a series of co-productions between Gainsborough and German firms during the era, but it failed to meet the requirements to qualify as a British quota film.

A German-language version A Blonde Dream and a French-language version (Un rêve blond) were filmed at the same time. The film was shot in Berlin at the Babelsberg Studios using principally British actors. The film's sets were designed by the art director Erich Kettelhut.

== Synopsis ==
A young woman who dreams of going to Hollywood and becoming a star, meets two window cleaners and falls in love with both of them.

== Cast ==
- Lilian Harvey as Jou-Jou
- Jack Hulbert as Willie I
- Cicely Courtneidge as Illustrated Ida
- Sonnie Hale as Willie II
- Edward Chapman as Colonel
- Percy Parsons as Merriman
- Clifford Heatherley as Commissionaire
- Charles Redgie as Secretary
