= A Blonde Dream =

1932 film

- German film poster
- German: Ein blonder Traum
- Directed by: Paul Martin
- Written by: Walter Reisch; Billy Wilder
- Produced by: Erich Pommer
- Starring: Lilian Harvey; Willy Fritsch; Willi Forst
- Cinematography: Otto Baecker; Konstantin Irmen-Tschet; Günther Rittau
- Edited by: Willy Zeyn
- Music by: Werner R. Heymann
- Production company: UFA
- Distributed by: UFA
- Release date: 23 September 1932
- Running time: 98 minutes
- Country: Germany
- Language: German

A Blonde Dream (German: Ein blonder Traum) is a 1932 German musical comedy film directed by Paul Martin and starring Lilian Harvey, Willy Fritsch and Willi Forst. A separate English-language version Happy Ever After was made as a co-production with Gainsborough Pictures. A French-language version was also released.

It was shot at the Babelsberg Studios in Berlin. The film's sets were designed by the art director Erich Kettelhut.

== Plot ==
Berlin at the height of the Depression at the beginning of the 1930s. Two window cleaners from the Blitz-Blank cleaning company, Willy I and Willy II, cycle back and forth through the big city from job to job, from house to house, with a ladder and washing utensils. They get along and only clash when both are interested in the same girl. One day the blonde Jou-Jou enters her life. They see her through the window of the American Consulate General. When Jou-Jou is about to be thrown out of the building by the gruff porter, the two come to her defense.

Jou-Jou, who earns her living as a projectile in a traveling circus, dreams of a film career in America. A Mr. Merryman, presenting himself as a Hollywood mogul, once promised her a film career, charging her $25 for his services. The two Willys decide to help the girl. They take her home first so that she and her shaggy mongrel nicknamed Buffalo have a roof over their heads. The two protagonists live poorly but happily on the outskirts of the city, occupying two disused but romantic railway carriages that are looked after by an odd guy called 'Scarecrow'.

Jou-Jou is assigned a separate express train carriage as her private accommodation. But soon it becomes obvious that both Willy I and Willy II have their eyes on the blonde dream. "Scarecrow" warns Jou-Jou that her presence is threatening to test the friendship of the two window cleaners. When the girl reads in the newspaper that Mr. Merryman is in Berlin, the decision seems easy and she returns to Berlin. But disillusionment follows. It turns out that the man who introduced himself as Mr. Merryman was an impostor. But once she has met the real Mr. Merryman, she actually him into hiring her.

To bring the whole affair to a conclusion, Willy I and Jou-Jou become a couple and Willy II takes a job in Mr. Merryman's business.

== Cast ==
- Lilian Harvey as Jou-Jou
- Willy Fritsch as Willy I
- Willi Forst as Willy II
- Paul Hörbiger as Scarecrow
- Trude Hesterberg as Ilse, the illustrator
- C. Hooper Trask as Charles J. Merryman
- Hans Deppe as Merryman's secretary
- Wolfgang Heinz as Portier
- Barbara Pirk
- Ina von Elben
- Ernst Behmer
- Hugo Döblin
- Ilse Korseck
