= Hungarian Rhapsody (1928 film) =

1928 film directed by Hanns Schwarz

- Directed by: Hanns Schwarz
- Written by: Joe May; Hans Székely
- Produced by: Erich Pommer
- Starring: Lil Dagover; Willy Fritsch; Dita Parlo
- Cinematography: Carl Hoffmann
- Edited by: Erich Schmidt
- Music by: William Frederick Peters; Willy Schmidt-Gentner
- Production company: UFA
- Distributed by: UFA
- Release date: 5 November 1928
- Running time: 97 minutes
- Country: Germany
- Languages: Silent Version; German Intertitles; Sound (Synchronized); English Intertitles

Hungarian Rhapsody (German: Ungarische Rhapsodie) is a 1928 German silent drama film directed by Hanns Schwarz and starring Lil Dagover, Willy Fritsch and Dita Parlo. It depicts the life of an impoverished Hungarian aristocrat.

It was shot at the Babelsberg Studios in Potsdam and on location in Southern Hungary. Premiering at the Ufa-Palast am Zoo, it was one of the most popular German films released that year. In 1929, a sound version was prepared by Paramount Pictures due to the public's apathy to silent films. While the sound version has no audible dialog, it features a synchronized musical score with sound effects using both the sound-on-disc and sound-on-film process. Since the sound version was more widely seen, UFA producer Erich Pommer describe this film as his first "sound film", rather than Melody of the Heart.

The film's sets were designed by the art director Erich Kettelhut. The Italian acton and future star Osvaldo Valenti made his debut in the film.

== Cast ==
- Lil Dagover as Camilla
- Willy Fritsch as Franz Leutnant Graf v. Turoczy
- Dita Parlo as Marika
- Fritz Greiner as Gutsverwalter Doczy - ihr Vater
- Gisela Bathory as Frau Doczy - ihre Mutter
- Erich Kaiser-Titz as General Hoffmann
- Leopold Kramer as Baron Barsody
- Andor Heltai as Ein Zigeunerprimas
- Harry Hardt as Oberleutnant Barany
- Osvaldo Valenti as Der Fähnrich
- Paul Hörbiger as Kellner
- Max Wogritsch as Bischof

== Music ==
The sound version featured a theme song entitled “Marika” by Allan Stuart (words) and William Peters (music).

== See also ==
- List of early sound feature films (1926–1929)

== Bibliography ==
- Hardt, Ursula. From Caligari to California: Erich Pommer's Life in the International Film Wars. Berghahn Books, 1996.
