= Early to Bed (1933 film) =

1933 British-German film by Ludwig Berger

- Directed by: Ludwig Berger
- Written by: Robert Liebmann; Robert Stevenson; Hans Székely
- Produced by: Erich Pommer
- Starring: Heather Angel; Fernand Gravey; Edmund Gwenn; Sonnie Hale
- Cinematography: Friedl Behn-Grund
- Music by: Werner R. Heymann
- Production companies: UFA; Gaumont British
- Distributed by: Woolf & Freedman Film Service
- Release date: 27 November 1933
- Running time: 83 minutes
- Countries: Germany; United Kingdom
- Language: English

Early to Bed is a 1933 British-German romantic comedy film directed by Ludwig Berger and starring Heather Angel, Fernand Gravey and Edmund Gwenn.

== Plot ==
A young waiter and a manicurist share the same room without ever meeting – because she works in the day and he at night. They encounter each other for the first time, and fall in love, without realising that they are already roommates.

== Cast ==
- Heather Angel as Grete
- Fernand Gravey as Carl
- Edmund Gwenn as Kruger
- Sonnie Hale as Helmut
- Donald Calthrop as Peschke
- Lady Tree as Widow Seidelblast
- Athene Seyler as Frau Weiser
- Jillian Sand as Trude
- Leslie Perrins as Mayer
- Lewis Shaw as Wolf
- Comedian Harmonists as Themselves

== Production ==
The film was made as a co-production between the German giant UFA and Gaumont British. As was common at the time, the film was made as a multiple-language production with three separate versions modelled on the German original I by Day, You by Night. Early to Bed was made at the Babelsberg Studio in Berlin, along with the French and German versions. Robert Stevenson acted as a supervisor. The casting of the comedian Sonnie Hale in a supporting role slanted the British version in a more humorous direction than its counterparts.

== Bibliography ==
- Bergfelder, Tim & Cargnelli, Christian. Destination London: German-speaking emigrés and British cinema, 1925–1950. Berghahn Books, 2008.
- Hardt, Ursula. From Caligari to California: Erich Pommer's life in the International Film Wars. Berghahn Books, 1996.
- Kreimeier, Klaus. The Ufa Story: A History of Germany's Greatest Film Company, 1918–1945. University of California Press, 1999.
