= The Stowaway (1922 film) =

1922 film

- Directed by: Victor Janson
- Written by: Franz Rauch
- Produced by: Ossi Oswalda; Gustav von Koczian-Miskolczy
- Starring: Ossi Oswalda
- Cinematography: Friedrich Paulmann
- Production company: Ossi Oswalda-Film
- Distributed by: UFA
- Release date: 29 August 1922
- Country: Germany
- Languages: Silent; German intertitles

The Stowaway (German: Der blinde Passagier) is a 1922 German silent comedy film directed by Victor Janson and starring Ossi Oswalda.

== Cast ==
- Ossi Oswalda

and in alphabetical order

- Willi Allen
- Georg Baselt
- Henry Bender
- Wilhelm Diegelmann
- Willy Fritsch
- Heinrich Gotho
- Victor Janson
- Hans Junkermann
- Franz Rauch
- Robert Scholz
- Mizzi Schütz

== Bibliography ==
- Bock, Hans-Michael & Bergfelder, Tim. The Concise CineGraph. Encyclopedia of German Cinema. Berghahn Books, 2009.
