= Congress Dances =

1932 film

- Directed by: Erik Charell
- Written by: Norbert Falk; Rowland Leigh; Robert Liebmann
- Produced by: Erich Pommer
- Starring: Lilian Harvey; Conrad Veidt; Henri Garat
- Cinematography: Carl Hoffmann
- Edited by: Viktor Gertler
- Music by: Werner R. Heymann
- Production company: UFA
- Distributed by: Gaumont-British (UK); United Artists (US)
- Release date: 11 April 1932
- Running time: 92 minutes
- Country: Germany
- Language: English
- Budget: 4 million Reichsmarks (equivalent to 16 million 2021 €)

Congress Dances is a 1932 German comedy film directed by Erik Charell and starring Lilian Harvey, Conrad Veidt and Henri Garat. It was an English-language version of the German film Der Kongreß tanzt. A separate French-language version Le congrès s'amuse was also made. It is centered on the Congress of Vienna, where an Austrian commoner is mistaken for the Tsar of Russia.

It was made at the Babelsberg Studio near Berlin. The film's sets were designed by Robert Herlth and Walter Röhrig.

It was remade in Austria in 1955 as The Congress Dances

== Cast ==
- Lilian Harvey as Christel
- Conrad Veidt as Prince Metternich
- Henri Garat as Zar Alexander I / Uralsky
- Lil Dagover as Countess
- Gibb McLaughlin as Bibikoff
- Reginald Purdell as Pepi
- Philipp Manning as King of Saxony
- Humberston Wright as Duke of Wellington
- Helen Haye as Princess
- Spencer Trevor as Finance Minister
- Tarquini d'Or as Heurige Singer
