= Spione =

1928 film by Fritz Lang

- Directed by: Fritz Lang
- Written by: Thea von Harbou; Fritz Lang
- Produced by: Erich Pommer
- Starring: Rudolf Klein-Rogge; Gerda Maurus; Willy Fritsch; Georg John; Lien Deyers
- Cinematography: Fritz Arno Wagner
- Music by: Werner R. Heymann
- Distributed by: UFA
- Release date: 22 March 1928
- Running time: Original: 178 min. (16 frame/s); Restoration (2003–2004) & DVD: 143 min.
- Country: Weimar Republic
- Languages: Silent film German intertitles

Spione (German: [ˈʃpi̯oːnə]; English title: Spies, under which title it was released in the United States) is a 1928 German silent espionage thriller directed by Fritz Lang and co-written with his wife, Thea von Harbou, who also wrote a novel of the same name, published a year later. The film was Lang's penultimate silent film and the first for his own production company, Fritz Lang-Film GmbH. As in Lang's Mabuse films, Dr. Mabuse: The Gambler (1922) and The Testament of Dr. Mabuse (1933), Rudolf Klein-Rogge plays a master criminal aiming for world domination.

Spione was restored to something short of its original length by the Friedrich Wilhelm Murnau Foundation during 2003 and 2004. No original negatives survive but a high quality nitrate copy is held at the National Film Archive in Prague.

== Plot ==
Spies (1928)

Germany, 1927: Beautiful Russian spy Sonja Baranikowa seduces Colonel Jellusič into betraying his country (an unnamed eastern European one) for her employer, Haghi, a seemingly respectable bank director who is actually the leader of a powerful criminal organization. Jason, head of the German Secret Service, gives the task of bringing the mysterious Haghi down to a handsome young agent known only as Number 326, who believes his identity is a secret. Haghi is well aware of him and assigns Sonja to worm her way into 326's confidence; Sonja convinces him that she has just shot a man for trying to rape her. He hides her from the police.

Haghi does not anticipate that the couple will fall in love. Unwilling to betray 326, Sonja quietly slips away after they spend the afternoon and evening together. He trails her to Jellusič, whom he mistakes for her lover (she is actually paying him off). Haghi suspects Sonja's feelings for 326 and when she refuses to act against him, Haghi confines her to a room in his secret headquarters.

Haghi seeks to steal a secret Japanese–British peace treaty, which will prevent "war in the East" unless it is exposed, before it reaches Tokyo. He blackmails Lady Leslane, an opium addict, into betraying what her husband knows of the negotiations. Akira Matsumoto, the Japanese head of security responsible for the treaty's safekeeping, crosses paths with 326. When 326 seeks out Sonja, he finds her apartment stripped bare; Matsumoto finds him drowning his sorrows in a bar and informs him that he would have arrested the woman as a spy.

Matsumoto gives three sealed packets to three couriers to deliver to Tokyo; he informs them that a copy of the treaty is inside one of them. Haghi obtains all three packages and finds only newspapers, but he has one more card up his sleeve. Matsumoto pities Kitty, a young woman he finds huddling in a doorway during a rainstorm and takes her in. When he prepares to leave for Japan with the treaty, she begs him to spend a few hours with her. He gives in, attracted by her beauty but when he wakes up later, she is gone with the treaty; disgraced, he commits ritual suicide.

326 tracks Jellusič down in his home country, but is too late; Haghi has already betrayed him, and when confronted by his superiors, Jellusič shoots himself. 326 wires the serial numbers of the bank notes used to pay Jellusič, which Jason passes on to agent No. 719, working undercover as a circus clown named Nemo, to trace. On a train trip out of the country in pursuit of the stolen treaty, 326 is nearly killed in a trap set by Haghi. While he is sleeping, his car is detached and left in a tunnel. He awakens just before another train smashes into it. Sonja, who had been tricked into being the one to smuggle the treaty out of the country by Haghi's promise not to harm 326, learns of the crash, races to the site and is reunited with her love.

326 gives orders for Haghi's bank to be surrounded, then sends Sonja away with his trusted chauffeur, Franz, while he and his men search for Haghi. Haghi captures Sonja and Franz and sends 326 an ultimatum, clear the building within 15 minutes or Sonja will die. Defiant, 326 continues searching, even after incapacitating gas is released. Franz is able to free himself and hold off Haghi's assassins until 326 can find them. Haghi's minions are captured but there is no sign of the mastermind. A clerk interrupts to complain to 326 and Jason that the serial numbers he was given to trace do not match the bank notes. The two realize that 719 is Haghi. When Nemo/719/Haghi goes on stage to perform his clown act, he sees that he is surrounded by armed agents and shoots himself in the head. The audience, believing it is all just part of his act, applauds.

== Cast ==
The lost opening credits were recreated in the 2004 restoration using censorship cards. The English translations are from the captions from the restored film.

- Rudolf Klein-Rogge as Haghi
- Gerda Maurus as Sonja
- Lien Deyers as Kitty
- Louis Ralph as Morrier
- Craighall Sherry as Polizeichef Jason [Chief Jason]
- Willy Fritsch as No. 326
- Paul Hörbiger as Franz, Chauffeur [Franz, the chauffeur]
- Hertha von Walther as Lady Leslane
- Lupu Pick as Dr. Matsumoto
- Fritz Rasp as Oberst Jellusič [Colonel Jellusič]

Uncredited

- Grete Berger in unconfirmed role
- Julius Falkenstein as hotel manager
- Heinrich Gotho as Burton Jason's other assistant
- Gustl Gstettenbaur as boy who helps No. 326
- Georg John as locomotive engineer
- Theodor Loos as Handelsminister
- Klaus Pohl as Burton Jason's assistant
- Paul Rehkopf as Strolch
- Rosa Valetti as Kitty's mother
- Hermann Vallentin as hotel security chief
- Hans Heinrich von Twardowski as Vincent, Jason's secretary

== Production ==
According to Robert Osborne, Lang was having an affair with Maurus during filming, even as his wife Thea von Harbou was involved writing the screenplay. Lang had earlier stolen the affections of Harbou from her first husband, Klein-Rogge, who played Haghi. In spite of this, Klein-Rogge worked with Lang and Harbou on various notable films, including Destiny (1921), Dr. Mabuse the Gambler (1922), Die Nibelungen (1924) and Metropolis (1927). Spione was the screen debut for young Dutch actress Lien Deyers, who caught Lang's attention after winning a screening contest in Vienna. During the shooting of the movie, Lang developed a strong dislike for Deyers. Regarding the casting of Agent 326, Lang surprisingly went for the upcoming teenage idol Willy Fritsch, whom he had seen in one of his by then typical juvenile lover parts in the silent film The Last Waltz (1927). Fritsch, who had just achieved some international success especially in the US by Parufamet distributed films, took the chance to escape from his image and was able to gain his final breakthrough with this film. Lang then also cast him for the leading part of his follow-up Woman In The Moon (1929). Spione was made at a substantially reduced budget as the studio looked to cancel Lang's contract following the poor commercial return of his previous film, Metropolis. Despite this, the third act train crash in particular is considered an extraordinary technical feat which belied budgetary restraints.

== Reception ==
On Rotten Tomatoes, the film holds an approval rating of 95% based on 16 reviews, with a weighted average rating of 9.3/10.

Giving a modern impression, Philip French of The Guardian wrote that the film "weaves together recurrent Lang themes of fate, fear, power and paranoia into a dynamic conspiracy thriller". Time Out described its tone as "somewhere between true pulp fiction and pure expressionism." Matthew Thrift of the British Film Institute meanwhile singled out the opening sequence as "a marvel of narrative economy in montage".

Eva Horn has identified the conspiracy in Spione as "mainly based on the use of media to encroach on individuals' most private secrets" and the ways media strips humans of "their identity, exploits them as mere tools for communication or information, and, most important, exploits their most private feelings"

== Restoration ==
A 143 minute version was restored in 2003–2004 by the Friedrich Wilhelm Murnau Foundation thanks to extensive research and co-operation with repositories all over the world. A high quality nitrate copy held at the National Film Archive in Prague was used as the restoration's basis, completed by copies from the Cinémathèque Française in Paris, the Filmarchiv Austria in Vienna and the National Film and Sound Archive in Canberra. Some of the intertitles were restored from the Austrian copy and an internegative from the state film archive Gosfilmofond in Domodedovo, Russia. The lab work was carried out by L'Immagine Ritrovata in Bologna. It is available on a DVD and Blu-ray from Kino International Corporation.
