= The Wooing of Eve =

1926 film directed by Max Mack

- German: Die Fahrt ins Abenteuer
- Directed by: Max Mack
- Written by: Curt J. Braun; Robert Liebmann
- Produced by: Harry R. Sokal
- Starring: Ossi Oswalda; Willy Fritsch; Agnes Esterhazy
- Cinematography: Curt Courant
- Music by: Werner R. Heymann
- Production company: Sokal-Film
- Distributed by: UFA
- Release date: 16 April 1926
- Country: Germany
- Languages: Silent; German intertitles

The Wooing of Eve or Journey into Adventure (German: Die Fahrt ins Abenteuer) is a 1926 German silent film directed by Max Mack and starring Ossi Oswalda, Willy Fritsch and Agnes Esterhazy.

The film's sets were designed by the art director Rudi Feld. It was shot at the Weissensee Studios in Berlin.

== Cast ==
- Ossi Oswalda as Ossi Bondy
- Willy Fritsch as Adam Bondy, Ossi's brother
- Agnes Esterhazy as Eva Frieson
- Lydia Potechina as Eva's mother
- Warwick Ward as F. W. Erler, writer
- Adolphe Engers as Bobby
- Gyula Szőreghy as Bondy's servant
