= Her Grace Commands =

1931 film

- Directed by: Hanns Schwarz
- Written by: Paul Frank; Robert Liebmann; Billy Wilder
- Starring: Käthe von Nagy; Willy Fritsch; Reinhold Schünzel; Paul Hörbiger
- Cinematography: Konstantin Irmen-Tschet; Günther Rittau
- Edited by: Willy Zeyn
- Music by: Werner R. Heymann
- Production company: Universum Film AG
- Distributed by: Universum Film AG
- Release date: 3 March 1931
- Running time: 96 minutes
- Country: Germany
- Language: German

Her Grace Commands (German: Ihre Hoheit befiehlt) is a 1931 German romantic comedy film directed by Hanns Schwarz and starring Käthe von Nagy, Willy Fritsch and Reinhold Schünzel. It is also translated into the alternative title Her Highness Commands. It was shot at the Babelsberg Studios with sets designed by the art director Erich Kettelhut. It premiered in Mannheim on 3 March 1931, before being released at the Gloria-Palast in Berlin the next day. A French-language version (Princess, At Your Orders!) was produced simultaneously, also directed by Schwarz but with a different cast. The film was remade in Hollywood as well, retitled Adorable, and released by the Fox Film Corporation in 1933.

== Synopsis ==
A hairdresser and a greengrocer fall in love, concealing from each other the truth that they are really a princess and an army officer in disguise.

== Main cast ==
- Käthe von Nagy as Prinzessin Marie-Christine
- Willy Fritsch as Leutnant Karl von Conradi
- Reinhold Schünzel as Staatsminister Graf Herlitz
- Paul Hörbiger as Hofdetektiv Pipac
- Paul Heidemann as Fürst von Leuchtenstein
- Michael von Newlinsky as Rittmeister
- Eugen Tiller as Major
- Kenneth Rive as König
- Erich Kestin as Bursche bei Conradi
- Erik Schütz as Stimmungssänger
- Attila Hörbiger as Wachtposten

== Bibliography ==
- Leblans, Anne; Federle, Courtney; Ward, Janet; Brodnax, Mary M.; Hake, Sabine (2001). Calhoon, Kenneth Scott (ed.). Peripheral Visions: The Hidden Stages of Weimar Cinema. Wayne State University Press. ISBN 978-0-8143-2928-3.
- Hardt, Ursula (1996). From Caligari to California: Erich Pommer's Life in the International Film Wars. Berghahn Books. ISBN 978-1-57181-930-7.
- Rogowski, Christian (2010). The Many Faces of Weimar Cinema: Rediscovering Germany's Filmic Legacy. Camden House. ISBN 978-1-57113-429-5.
