= The Three from the Filling Station (1930 film) =

1930 film

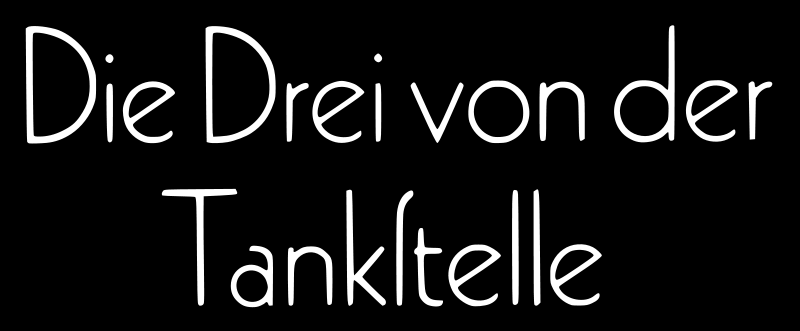
- Directed by: Wilhelm Thiele
- Written by: Franz Schulz; Paul Frank
- Produced by: Erich Pommer
- Starring: Lilian Harvey; Willy Fritsch; Oskar Karlweis; Heinz Rühmann
- Cinematography: Franz Planer
- Edited by: Viktor Gertler
- Music by: Werner R. Heymann
- Production company: UFA
- Distributed by: UFA
- Release date: 15 September 1930
- Running time: 99 minutes
- Country: Weimar Republic
- Language: German
- Budget: ℛ︁ℳ︁1.138m
- Box office: ℛ︁ℳ︁3.090m

The Three from the Filling Station (German: Die Drei von der Tankstelle) is a 1930 German musical film directed by Wilhelm Thiele and starring Lilian Harvey, Willy Fritsch, Heinz Rühmann, and Oskar Karlweis. Produced by Erich Pommer, the film was a major success for the UFA studio, outgrossing even The Blue Angel. Several songs composed by Werner R. Heymann and performed by the Comedian Harmonists have remained popular up to today. The film also had a heavy influence on Hollywood musicals during the 1930s.

== Plot summary ==
The Three from the Filling Station (1930)

Completely broke, the three friends Willy, Kurt and Hans are stranded on a country road when they run out of fuel and there is no filling station nearby. This inspires them to sell their car and open a filling station at that location. Taking turns at serving as petrol attendants, the three independently of one another fall in love with the same handsome and well-off customer Lilian, anxiously hiding their feelings for her from each other. However, the young woman only reciprocates Willy's feelings and invites him and his friends to a luxury restaurant in order to establish clarity. When Willy learns about his luck, he immediately renunciates his victory out of deference to his friends.

To establish close ties, Lilian asks her father to found a petrol company and to employ Willy as managing-director. The young man attaches his consent to the recruitment of his friends. When Lilian proceeds to become his secretary, an infuriated Willy dictates his dismissal notice which he promptly signs without further reading – and realises that in fact he has subscribed a marriage contract with Lilian.

== Other versions ==
A French-language version Le chemin du paradis was produced by UFA simultaneously, with Henri Garat taking Fritsch's part and Harvey reprising her own role (she was fluent in three languages). Unlike many multiple language versions produced by UFA, no English-language version was made.

A remake of the film The Three from the Filling Station starring Germaine Damar, Adrian Hoven, Walter Müller, and Walter Giller was released in 1955. Willy Fritsch again appeared, this time performing as the young woman's father. In 1972 the loosely-inspired film The Merry Quartet from the Filling Station was released in West Germany.

== Cast ==
- Lilian Harvey as Lilian Cossmann
- Willy Fritsch as Willy
- Heinz Rühmann as Hans
- Oskar Karlweis as Kurt
- Fritz Kampers as Konsul Cossmann
- Olga Chekhova as Edith von Turkow
- Kurt Gerron as Doctor Kalmus
- Gertrud Wolle as Doctor Kalmus' Secretary
- Felix Bressart as the Bailiff

The following musicians also make guest appearances in the film:

- Leo Monosson
- Comedian Harmonists
- Lewis Ruth Band

== Reception ==
In a list of the 100 most important German films, compiled in 1994 by the Association of German Cinémathèques, Destiny was placed at #55.

== Bibliography ==
- Hardt, Ursula. From Caligari to California: Erich Pommer's Life in the International Film Wars. Berghahn Books, 1996.
