= Faust (1926 film) =

1926 German film by F. W. Murnau

- Theatrical release poster
- Directed by: F. W. Murnau
- Written by: Hans Kyser
- Produced by: Erich Pommer
- Starring: Gösta Ekman; Emil Jannings; Camilla Horn; Wilhelm Dieterle; Frida Richard; Yvette Guilbert
- Cinematography: Carl Hoffmann
- Music by: Werner Richard Heymann (in the premiere); William Axt (U.S., uncredited)
- Distributed by: Ufa (Germany); Metro-Goldwyn-Mayer (U.S.)
- Release dates: 14 October 1926 (Berlin, Germany); 5 December 1926 (U.S.)
- Running time: 106 minutes
- Country: Germany
- Languages: Silent film German intertitles
- Budget: 2 million ℛ︁ℳ︁ (equivalent to €8 million in 2021)
- Box office: 1 million ℛ︁ℳ︁ (equivalent to €4 million in 2021)

Faust – A German Folktale (German: Faust – Eine deutsche Volkssage) is a 1926 silent fantasy film, produced by Ufa, directed by F. W. Murnau, starring Gösta Ekman as Faust, Emil Jannings as Mephisto, Camilla Horn as Gretchen/Marguerite, Frida Richard as her mother, Wilhelm Dieterle as her brother, and Yvette Guilbert as Marthe Schwerdtlein, her aunt. Murnau's film draws on older traditions of the legendary tale of Faust as well as on Goethe's classic 1808 version. Ufa wanted Ludwig Berger to direct Faust, as Murnau was engaged with Variety; Murnau pressured the producer and, backed by Jannings, eventually persuaded Erich Pommer to let him direct the film.

Faust was Murnau's last German film, and directly afterward he moved to the United States under contract to William Fox to direct Sunrise: A Song of Two Humans (1927); when the film premiered in the Ufa-Palast am Zoo in Berlin, Murnau was already shooting in Hollywood. Faust has been praised for its special effects and is regarded as an example of German expressionist film.

== Plot ==
Faust (1926) by F. W. Murnau

The demon Mephisto has a bet with an Archangel that he can corrupt a righteous man's soul and destroy in him what is divine. If he succeeds, the Devil will win dominion over earth.

The Devil delivers a plague to the village where Faust, an elderly alchemist, lives. Though he prays to stop the death and starvation, nothing happens. Disheartened, Faust throws his alchemy books in the fire, and then the Bible too. One book opens, showing how to have power and glory by making a pact with the Devil. He goes to a crossroads as described in the book's procedure and conjures up the forces of evil. When Mephisto appears at the roadside, he induces Faust to make a trial, 24-hour bargain with the Devil. Faust will have Mephisto's service till the sand runs out in an hourglass, at which time the Devil will rescind the pact. At first, Faust uses his new power to help the people of the village, but they shun him when they find out that he cannot face a cross. They stone him and he takes shelter in his home.

Faust then makes a further deal with Mephisto, who gives Faust back his youth and offers him earthly pleasures and a kingdom, in return for his immortal soul. Mephisto tempts Faust with the vision of a beautiful woman. He then takes him to a wedding feast in Parma, to meet the subject of his vision, an Italian Duchess. Faust departs with her, leaving the Devil to kill her groom. Just as Faust is making love to her the sands run out. He is obliged to seal the deal permanently in order to continue his love-making; he is Mephisto's forever.

Faust soon grows weary of debauchery and yearns for "home". Here Faust falls in love with an innocent girl, Gretchen, who is charmed into loving Faust by a golden chain left by the Devil.

Faust comes to Gretchen's room. The devil rouses the mother who sees them and drops dead from shock. The devil then incites her soldier brother, Valentin, to run home to catch her lover. Valentin and Faust fight a duel. The Devil intervenes and stabs Valentin in the back. He then goes around town shouting "murder". Faust and Mephisto flee on the back of a hellish steed.

Valentin condemns Faust for his murder and his sister as a harlot in his dying breath. She is put in the stocks and subjected to jeering. The girl has a child (by Faust) and ends up in the streets. In a blizzard she sees a vision of a warm cradle and lays her child down on the snow, where the child dies of exposure. Soldiers find her and she is sent to the stake as a murderess. Faust sees what is happening and demands Mephisto take him there. Faust arrives just as the fire has been started to burn his lover. Faust wishes he had never asked to have his youth back. Mephisto smashes the mirror with Faust's reflection and he loses his youth. He runs through the assembled mob towards Gretchen; and it is as an old man that Faust throws himself onto the fire to be with his beloved.

Gretchen recognizes Faust and sees him in her heart as a young man again as the fire consumes them together. Their spirits rise to the heavens. The angel reveals to Mephisto that he has lost the bet because Love has triumphed over all.

== Cast ==
- Gösta Ekman as Faust
- Emil Jannings as Mephisto
- Camilla Horn as Gretchen
- Frida Richard as Gretchen's mother
- William Dieterle as Valentin, Gretchen's brother
- Yvette Guilbert as Marthe Schwerdtlein, Gretchen's aunt
- Eric Barclay as Duke of Parma
- Hanna Ralph as Duchess of Parma
- Werner Fuetterer as Archangel

== Production, release history and restoration ==
=== Production history ===
Murnau's Faust was the most technically elaborate and expensive production undertaken by Ufa until it was surpassed by Metropolis the following year. Filming took six months, at a cost of 2 million ℛ︁ℳ︁ (only half was recovered at the box office). According to film historians, Faust seriously affected studio shooting and special effects techniques. Murnau uses two cameras, both filming multiple shots; many scenes were filmed time and again. As an example, a short sequence of the contract being written on parchment in fire took an entire day to film.

=== Intertitles ===
The task of writing the intertitles was originally assigned to Hans Kyser, a German novelist and playwright who had moved into screenwriting. He decided to combine various lines from the original folk tale, Christopher Marlowe's Doctor Faustus and Goethe's Faust, Part 1, as well as providing some of his own. However, his efforts were disliked by the Ufa production team, and Gerhart Hauptmann, one of Germany's leading playwrights and winner of the Nobel prize for literature, was engaged instead. Hauptmann agreed to write his own completely new intertitles for 40,000 ℛ︁ℳ︁, twice what Ufa had offered. Kyser found out, and there was an exchange of vituperative letters between the two writers.

The film received a pre-release showing with Hauptmann's intertitles at the Ufa-Pavillon am Nollendorfplatz on 26 August 1926. Unfortunately, Ufa's directors felt that Hauptmann's titles were even worse: Ufa informed Hauptmann just a week before the premiere of "unexpected difficulties", and in the end Faust opened with Kyser's intertitles at the Ufa-Palast am Zoo on 14 October 1926. Hauptmann's verses were separately printed as a brochure for sale in cinemas.

=== Variant cuts ===
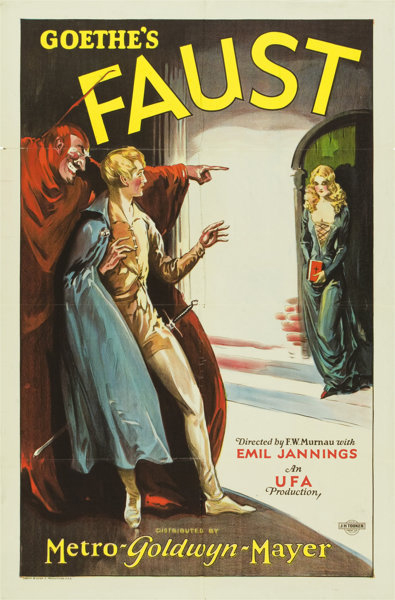
U.S. theatrical release poster

There were several versions created of Faust, several of them prepared by Murnau himself. The versions are quite different from one another. Some scenes have variants on pace, others have actors with different costumes and some use different camera angles. For example, a scene with a bear was shot with both a person in costume and an actual bear. In some versions, the bear simply stands there. In one version, it actually strikes an actor.

Overall, five versions of Faust are known to exist out of the over thirty copies found across the globe: a German original version (of which the only surviving copy is in the Danish Film Institute), a French version, a late German version which exists in two copies, a bilingual version for Europe prepared by Ufa and a version prepared in July, 1926 by Murnau himself, for release in the U.S. market by Metro-Goldwyn-Mayer.

=== Restoration and versions known to exist ===
The copy of the original German version lacks a number of scenes. With the copies available, a 106-minute reconstructed version has been released by Kino International with English intertitles on DVD. A commentary is also an optional extra on the DVD. The original intertitles have also been recovered.

The U.S. version includes titles and scenes filmed especially by Murnau, where for example the scene in which Aunt Marthe offers Mephisto a drink that he rejects as causing heartburn: in the U.S. version, Mephisto rejects the drink for having had alcohol, an ironic reference to Prohibition in the United States; again in the U.S. version, Mephisto offers Marta a necklace, from the Great Khan of the Tartars, rather than the cousin from Lombardy, as Murnau believed the U.S. audience would not have heard of Lombardy. One scene was done with a text juxtaposition, as again, Murnau believed the American audience would not grasp the imagery by itself. This is also the only version having the originally conceived finale of the ascension of Faust and Gretchen into Heaven. In all others, the scene is rather more conceptual. Books appearing in the film were labeled or any plans with text were shot twice, in German and in English.

The bilingual version was prepared to be shown aboard trans-Atlantic ships traveling from Hamburg to New York City. Therefore, they catered to both American and German audiences.

The French version is generally believed to represent the poorest choice of scenes, both including the largest number of filming errors (e.g., showing assistants holding doors, actors slipping, Gretchen stepping on her dress, showing the stage maquette). It does hold takes that do not exist in any other versions, however.

== Reception ==
Faust was initially a financial and critical flop; German critics reacting to the adaptation with hostility due to the deviations from its source texts and Gösta Ekman's performance.

In later years, the film has been received much more positively; called one of seven "canonical examples of German expressionist cinema". Film review aggregator Rotten Tomatoes reported an approval rating of 91%, based on 34 reviews, with a rating average of 8.3/10. In a list of the 100 most important German films, compiled in 1994 by the Association of German Cinémathèques, Faust was placed at #26.

A 2006 review in The New York Times called it "one of the most astonishing visual experiences the silent cinema has to offer." Japanese film director Shinji Aoyama listed Faust as one of ten greatest films of all time in 2012. He said, "I always want to remember that movies are made out of the joy of the replica. The fascination of movies is not their realism, but how to enjoy the "real". In that sense, I always have Faust in my mind as I face a movie, make a movie, and talk about a movie."

== Legacy ==
The Readers Library Publishing Company published in 1926 a "Readers Library Film Edition", an adaptation of the film plot to novel form written by Hayter Preston and Henry Savage. The "Bald Mountain" scene served as the inspiration for the "Night on Bald Mountain" sequence in Walt Disney's 1940 animated film Fantasia.

== Home media ==
- In 1995, the American Composer Timothy Brock composed a soundtrack to the film, which has been released on CD by K Records and the 1996 Laserdisc release of the film.
- In 2003, a DVD was released in Spain, containing a detailed documentary by Filmoteca Española on the making of Faust, as well as a comparative analysis of the several copies and versions released.
- In 2004, British musician and composer Geoff Smith composed a new soundtrack to the film for the hammered dulcimer, which he performed live as an accompaniment to the film.
- In 2005, a DVD was released featuring new music written by Dutch jazz composer Willem Breuker. Willem Breuker Kollektief performed the score as live accompaniment to the film in a number of locations.
- In 2006, A DVD version of the film was released with a new soundtrack performed on the harp by Stan Ambrose.
- In 2007, UK-based American composer Jean Hasse (Visible Music) wrote a score for chamber orchestra to accompany the film. John Traill conducted performances in Bristol (Victoria Rooms) and London (Barbican Cinema 1) in October 2007. In March 2026, a full-orchestra version of Jean Hasse's score is premiered by the Theatro São Pedro Orchestra, conducted by Marcelo Falcão, in São Paulo, Brazil.
- In 2016, Swiss-born composer Daniel Schnyder, joined by other musicians, performed his own original soundtrack for the film when it was screened at the National Gallery of Art in Washington.
- In 2022, guitarist Steve Gunn performed his own original soundtrack for the film when it was screened at the City Dudes blindfolded film program in New York City.

== See also ==
- List of German films of 1919–1932

== Bibliography ==
- Eisner, Lotte H. Murnau, (A Shadows book), Berkeley, California: University of California Press, 1973, ISBN 9780520024250.
- Kreimeier, Klaus (1999). The Ufa Story: A History of Germany's Greatest Film Company, 1918–1945. University of California Press. ISBN 9780520220690.
- Los cinco Faustos, documentary film by Filmoteca Española.
