= Werner R. Heymann =

German film composer

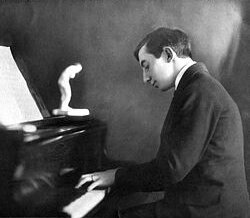
- Born: 14 February 1896; Königsberg, East Prussia, Germany (now Kaliningrad, Russia)
- Died: 30 May 1961 (aged 65); Munich, West Germany
- Occupation: Composer
- Years active: 1912–1961

Werner Richard Heymann (14 February 1896 – 30 May 1961), also known as Werner R. Heymann, was a German-Jewish composer active in Germany and in Hollywood.

== Early life and education ==
He was the younger of 4 boys born to a corn merchant. His older brother Walther Heymann who died young wrote expressionistic poems for the magazine Der Sturm published by Herwalth Walden. Werner was a child prodigy, starting to sit at the piano at age 3, receiving violin lessons at age 5, and writing his own compositions at age 8.

He became a member of the Philharmonic at age 12 and presented his first work for orchestra at age 16. His Spring Nocturne for Orchestra was based on one of his brother's texts. Although he had served in the Prussian Army during World War I, he later became involved with the post-war radical politics and pacifism of the Berlin scene. Moving to composing for the stage, he wrote the music for the Ernst Toller play Transformation.

== Popular music and film ==
When the theater impresario Max Reinhardt opened the satirical cabaret Sound and Smoke he became, with Friedrich Hollaender, one of its two main pianists. Later the film producer Erich Pommer introduced him to the UFA studio, where he wrote music that accompanied over a dozen silents, including Faust by F. W. Murnau and Spies by Fritz Lang.

When sound came in, the songs he wrote for the then popular musicals became hits and are the work for which he is most well known today. Among these films is The Congress Dances, directed by Erik Charell, with whom he would work again soon on Caravan in Hollywood, after he left his country early, along with other artists, when the National Socialists took power in 1933.

The émigré German director Ernst Lubitsch got him to work on 5 of his classic American comedies. He also scored 2 films by another great comedy director, Preston Sturges. Heymann was an Academy Award nominee four times in the early 1940s.

== Later years ==
After World War II, he returned to Germany, where he wrote the music for a stage version of the classic film The Blue Angel in 1952, and was a member of the jury at the 10th Berlin International Film Festival.

His memoirs, recorded on tape during his last years, were published as an autobiography in Germany in 2001. He had once summed up his thoughts thus: "I love my wife, my child, the world, eating, drinking, smoking, driving. I love freedom. I hate dictatorship, godlessness, writing scores, wool next to my skin, and stones in my shoes. I hope for a United States of Europe." A documentary film about his career, So Wie Ein Wunder, featuring his daughter Elisabeth Trautwein, and directed by New German Cinema auteur Helma Sanders-Brahms, was shown on German television in 2012.

== Partial filmography ==
- Faust – Eine deutsche Volkssage (1926; lost)
- The Wooing of Eve (1926)
- Vienna – Berlin (1926)
- The Man in the Fire (1926)
- His Toughest Case (1926)
- Maytime (1926)
- A Sister of Six (1926)
- The White Horse Inn (1926)
- The Brothers Schellenberg (1926)
- The Girl on a Swing (1926)
- The Son of Hannibal (1926)
- Napoléon (1927)
- Valencia (1927)
- A Modern Dubarry (1927)
- My Aunt, Your Aunt (1927)
- Aftermath (1927)
- Eva and the Grasshopper (1927)
- The Last Waltz (1927)
- Regine (1927)
- The Great Leap (1927)
- Spione (1928)
- Melody of the Heart (1929)
- Waltz of Love (1930)
- The Road to Paradise (1930)
- The Three from the Filling Station (1930)
- Der Kongreß tanzt (1931)
- Captain Craddock (1931)
- Her Grace Commands (1931)
- Princess, At Your Orders! (1931)
- Bombs on Monte Carlo (1931)
- Quick (1932)
- Congress Dances (1932)
- I by Day, You by Night (1932)
- A Blonde Dream (1932)
- Happy Ever After (1932)
- The Victor (1932)
- Adorable (1933)
- Season in Cairo (1933)
- Early to Bed (1933)
- Caravan (1934)
- The Great Refrain (1936)
- Angel (1937)
- Bluebeard's Eighth Wife (1938)
- Ninotchka (1939)
- The Shop Around the Corner (1940)
- One Million B.C. (1940) (Oscar nomination)
- He Stayed for Breakfast (1940)
- This Thing Called Love (1940)
- She Knew All the Answers (1941)
- Bedtime Story (1941)
- That Uncertain Feeling (1941) (Oscar nomination)
- The Wife Takes a Flyer (1942)
- Flight Lieutenant (1942)
- To Be or Not to Be (1942) (Oscar nomination)
- Appointment in Berlin (1943)
- Hail the Conquering Hero (1944)
- Knickerbocker Holiday (1944) (Oscar nomination)
- Mademoiselle Fifi (1944)
- It's in the Bag! (1945)
- The Sin of Harold Diddlebock (1947)
- A Heidelberg Romance (1951)
- Alraune (1952)
- The Three from the Filling Station (1955)
- The Congress Dances (1955)
- Bombs on Monte Carlo (1960)

== Musical works ==
=== Symphonic Works (selection) ===
- Frühlings-Notturno, Op. 4
- Rapsodische Sinfonie, Op. 5 (1918)
- Der Tanz der Götter (Dance of the Gods), Op. 6/1
- Cortège exotique
- Sérénade passionnée
- Die Wandlung
- Die Sendung Samuels
- Artisten
- Professor Unrat
- 'Fausts Geheimnis (Faust's Secret, after W.R. Heymann), Op. 96

=== Operettas ===
- Florestan I. Prince de Monaco
- Trente et Quarante
