= Adorable (film) =

1933 film directed by William Dieterle

- Directed by: William Dieterle
- Written by: Billy Wilder; Robert Liebman; Paul Frank; George Marion Jr. Jane Storm
- Starring: Janet Gaynor; Herbert Mundin; Sterling Holloway
- Cinematography: John F. Seitz
- Edited by: Robert Bischoff; Irene Morra
- Music by: Werner R. Heymann; Richard A. Whiting
- Distributed by: Fox Film Corporation
- Release date: May 19, 1933
- Running time: 88 minutes
- Country: United States
- Language: English

Adorable is a 1933 American pre-Code musical comedy film directed by William Dieterle and starring Janet Gaynor as a princess who disguises herself in order to go out socially and have fun, falling in love with a "commoner" in the process. The film also stars Herbert Mundin and Sterling Holloway. It is a remake of the 1931 German romantic comedy Her Grace Commands.

== Plot ==
Janet Gaynor plays a rebellious princess who must try to marry the man she loves, instead of the stuffy old prince her parents want her to marry. But will this ordinary man love her back once he finds out she's a princess?

== Cast ==
- Janet Gaynor as "Mitzi"
- Henri Garat as Karl Conrad
- C. Aubrey Smith as Prime Minister Von Heynitz
- Herbert Mundin as Detective Pipac
- Blanche Friderici as The Countess
- Sterling Holloway as Emile (uncredited)
