= Melody of the Heart =

1929 film

- Directed by: Hanns Schwarz
- Written by: Hans Székely
- Produced by: Erich Pommer
- Starring: Dita Parlo; Willy Fritsch; Gerő Mály; Marcsa Simon
- Cinematography: Günther Rittau; Hans Schneeberger
- Music by: Werner R. Heymann
- Production company: Universum Film AG
- Distributed by: Universum Film AG
- Release date: 16 December 1929
- Running time: 88 minutes
- Country: Germany
- Language: German

Melody of the Heart (German: Melodie des Herzens) is a 1929 German musical film directed by Hanns Schwarz and starring Dita Parlo, Willy Fritsch and Gerő Mály.

The film was the first successful sound film produced by the German major studio Universum Film AG (Ufa) and was credited with establishing the popularity of the operetta film. It was shot in Hungary. Initially the film was intended to be silent, but halfway through production its producer Erich Pommer was ordered by his superiors to convert it into a sound film.

Ufa had recently made a deal with the Klangfilm syndicate (consisting of Siemens & Halske, AEG, and Polyphon-Werke AG (who sold Polydor records) to license the Tri-Ergon sound film system, under the name 'Ufa-Klang'. A previous attempt in 1925 by Ufa to use an earlier version of the same system, at the time owned by Klangfilm's former competitor, Tobis, had ended in failure.

The film premiered at the Ufa-Palast am Zoo in Berlin on 16 December 1929. It was released in four different languages: German, English, French and Hungarian. Such multiple-language versions, which had been pioneered by British International Pictures, were popular in Europe until dubbing became more widespread.

== Cast ==
- Dita Parlo as Julia Balog
- Willy Fritsch as János Garas
- Gerő Mály as Vater Garas
- Marcsa Simon as Mutter Garas
- János Körmendy as Vater Kovács
- Juliska Ligeti as Mutter Kovács
- Anni Mewes as Anna Kovács
- Tomy Endrey as Der kleine Kovács
- Ilka Grüning as Fräulein Czibulka
- László Dezsõffy as Zugführer Benézel

== See also ==
- List of early sound feature films (1926–1929)

== Bibliography ==
- Bergfelder, Tim & Bock, Hans-Michael. The Concise Cinegraph: Encyclopedia of German Cinema. Berghahn Books, 2009.
- Ford, Fiona (2011). The film music of Edmund Meisel (1894–1930) (PDF) (PhD thesis). University of Nottingham.
- Gomery, Douglas (1976). "Tri-Ergon, Tobis-Klangfilm, and the Coming of Sound". Cinema Journal. 16 (1). University of Texas Press, on behalf of the Society for Cinema & Media Studies: 51–61. doi:10.2307/1225449. JSTOR 1225449.
- Hardt, Ursula. From Caligari to California: Erich Pommer's Life in the International Film Wars. Berghahn Books, 1996.
- Kreimeier, Klaus. The Ufa Story: A History of Germany's Greatest Film Company, 1918-1945. University of California Press, 1999.
- Rogowski, Christian. The Many Faces of Weimar Cinema: Rediscovering Germany's Filmic Legacy. Camden House, 2010.
