= Leo Monosson =

German singer (1897–1967)

External audio
- Shellac recordings with Leo Monosson in the Online Archive of the Österreichische Mediathek
- Liebling, mein Herz läßt dich grüßen on YouTube

Leo Monosson (Russian: Лев Исаакович Моносзон, lit. Lev Isaakovich Monoisson) (1897–1967) was a tenor singer born in Moscow, who found fame in Germany in the years 1928-1933. He spoke eleven languages and produced over 1400 records, one of his best-known being "Liebling, mein Herz lässt dich grüßen" with the Ben Berlin Orchestra. He was also an actor, appearing in films such as the musical The Three From the Filling Station. Leo Monosson was an imaginist. As a Jew, he had to leave Germany in 1933, moving first to France and then the United States. In New York, he started a new career as a stamp trader.
