= Der Kongreß tanzt =

1931 film

Der Kongress tanzt (English: Congress Dances)
- Der Kongress tanzt (poster)
- Directed by: Erik Charell
- Written by: Norbert Falk; Robert Liebmann
- Produced by: Erich Pommer for Ufa
- Starring: Lilian Harvey; Willy Fritsch
- Edited by: Viktor Gertler
- Music by: Werner Richard Heymann
- Distributed by: Universum Film AG (UFA)
- Release dates: 29 September 1931 (Austria); 20 October 1931 (Germany)
- Running time: 85 minutes
- Country: Weimar Republic
- Languages: German; English; French

Der Kongress tanzt (English: The Congress Dances) is a German musical comedy film produced in 1931 by Ufa, directed by Erik Charell, starring Lilian Harvey as Christel Weinzinger, the glove seller, Willy Fritsch as Tsar Alexander I of Russia and his doppelgänger, Uralsky, Otto Wallburg as Bibikoff, his Adjutant, Conrad Veidt as Prince Metternich, Carl-Heinz Schroth as his Secretary, Pepi, Lil Dagover as the Countess and Alfred Abel as the King of Saxony.

Der Kongress tanzt is a particularly well achieved move in Ufa's attempt to challenge US supremacy in the European film arena, taking advantage of the introduction of sound. As such, the studio released the movie in three different language versions (MLV): in German, in French as Le congrès s'amuse, and English as Congress Dances. Lilian Harvey played in all three versions, as she spoke all languages; Henri Garat replaced Willy Fritsch for the French and English versions.

Despite the ambition and the auspicious beginning, Ufa's challenge to US supremacy never materialized, both due to the strength of the Hollywood majors and to the constraints Germany's creative film and performers would suffer from 1933 onwards.

"This truffle of cinema unfolds its flavours like a heavenly feast for the anonymous millions it is dedicated to." Lichtbild-Bühne.

== Plot ==
Der Kongress tanzt is set during the Congress of Vienna, that took place in 1814/1815 after the Napoleonic Wars, a meeting between the powers that was to set the frontiers of the world.

Traveling incognito among the people in the tradition of his ancestor Peter the Great, Russia's Tsar Alexander crosses paths with young Christel Weinzinger. The witty and charming Viennese glove seller advertises her business by throwing flowers with her business card into each passing carriage. Her overzealous promotion effort leads to her being charged with an assassination attempt but her punishment is waived and Christel is released.

Smitten with Christel, the Tsar finds her at her place of business. A romance develops, with Prince Metternich and his army of spies intending to use the situation to further his own agenda. And then there is Pepi, the Prince's secretary, who is also in love with Christel. When Christel tells her friends about the romance, they do not believe her, only to be all the more surprised when the Tsar arrives with a splendid carriage to whisk her away.

Their romance comes to an abrupt end when Napoléon Bonaparte escapes from the island of Elba and marches on Paris. The Tsar, as all other rulers, has to leave. Christel stays behind, miserable, but finds solace with Pepi.

== Cast ==
German version

- Lilian Harvey as Christel Weinzinger
- Willy Fritsch as Tsar Alexander of Russia
- Otto Wallburg as Bibikoff
- Conrad Veidt as Prince Metternich
- Carl-Heinz Schroth as Pepi
- Lil Dagover as The Countess
- Adele Sandrock as The Princess
- Margarete Kupfer as The Countess
- Julius Falkenstein as The Minister of Finance
- Max Gülstorff as The Burgermeister
- Paul Horbiger as Heurigen Singer
- Boris Romanoff as Dancer
- Ernst Stahl-Nachbaur as Napoleon

English version

- Lilian Harvey as Christel
- Conrad Veidt as Prince Metternich
- Henri Garat as Czar Alexander I / Uralsky
- Lil Dagover as Countess
- Gibb McLaughlin as Bibikoff
- Reginald Purdell as Pepi
- Philipp Manning as King of Saxony
- Humberston Wright as Duke of Wellington
- Helen Haye as Princess
- Spencer Trevor as Finance Minister
- Tarquini d'Or as Heurige Singer

French version

- Lilian Harvey as Christel Weizinger
- Lil Dagover as The Countess
- Henri Garat as Alexander Uralsky
- Armand Bernard as Bibikoff
- Pierre Magnier as Metternich
- Odette Talazac as The Princess
- Robert Arnoux as Pepi
- Sinoel as Finance Minister
- Jean Dax as Talleyrand
- Paul Ollivier as Le Maire de Vienne
- Tarquini d'Or as Heurige Singer

== Reception ==
In a list of the 100 most important German films, compiled in 1994 by the Association of German Cinémathèques, Der Kongreß tanzt was placed at #81.
