= Erich Pommer =

German-born film producer (1889–1966)

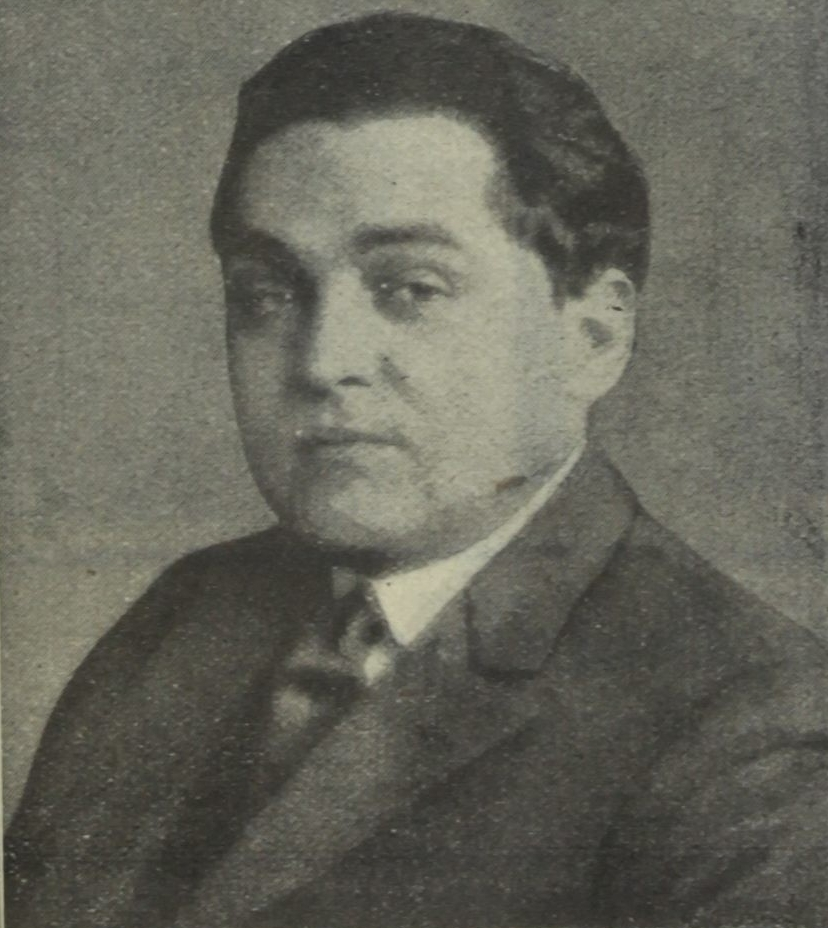
Erich Pommer c. 1925

Erich Pommer (20 July 1889 – 8 May 1966) was a German-born film producer and executive. Pommer was perhaps the most powerful person in the German and European film industries in the 1920s and early 1930s.

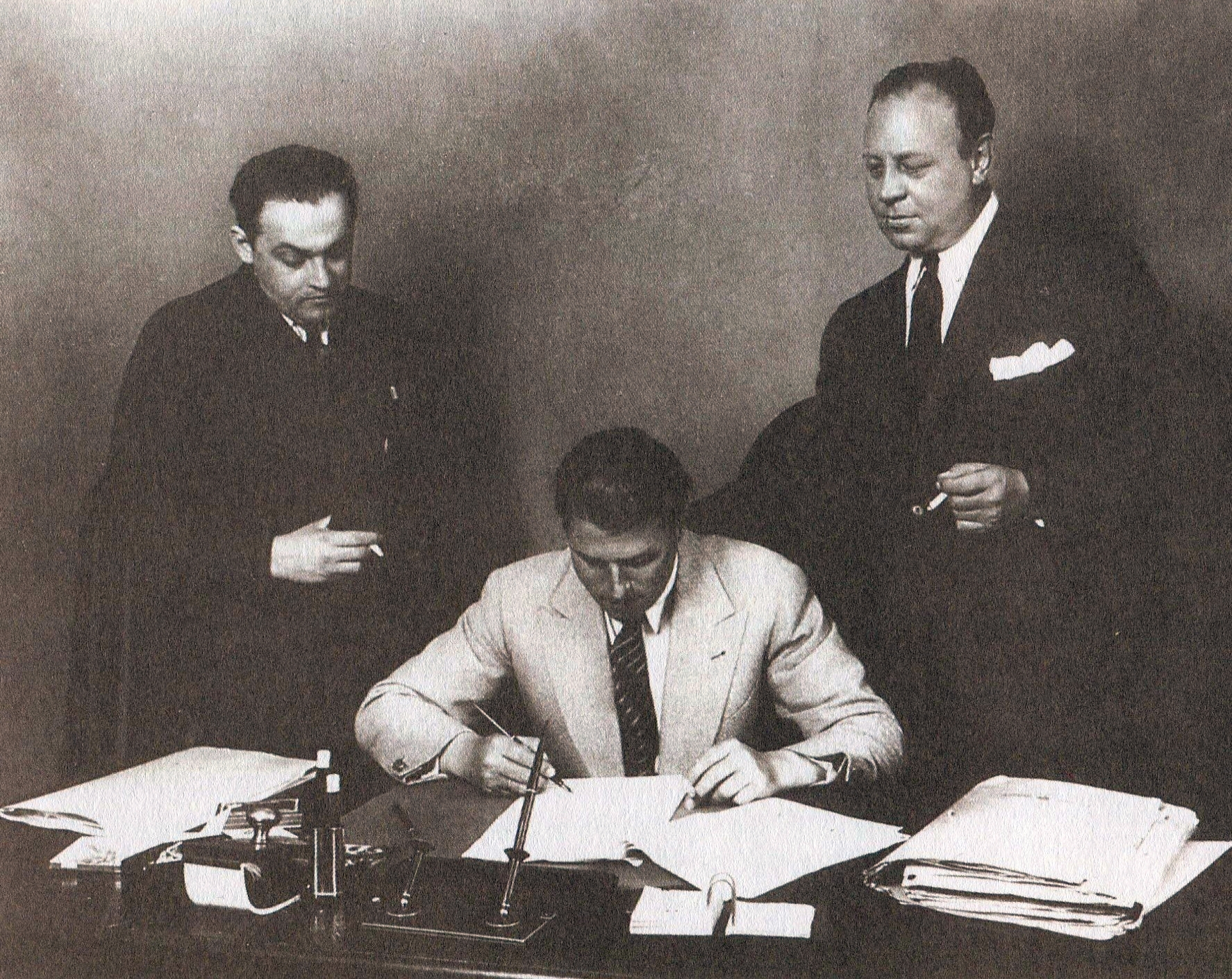
Erich Pommer (left) with Carl Zuckmayer and Emil Jannings (1929)

As producer, Erich Pommer was involved in the German Expressionist film movement during the silent era. As the head of production at Decla Film, Decla-Bioskop, and, from 1924 to 1926, at UFA, Pommer was responsible for many of the best known movies of the Weimar Republic such as The Cabinet of Dr. Caligari (1920), Dr. Mabuse, the Gambler (1922), Die Nibelungen (1924), Michael (1924), Der Letzte Mann / The Last Laugh (1924), Variety (1925), Tartuffe (1926), Manon Lescaut (1926), Faust (1926), Metropolis (1927) and The Blue Angel (1930). He later worked in American exile before returning to Germany to help rebuild the German film industry after World War II.

== Early life and career ==
Pommer was born in Hildesheim, Province of Hanover, to the Jewish couple Gustav Pommer and his wife Anna. His elder brother was Albert Pommer, who also became a film producer. After a brief apprenticeship with the Herrenkonfektion Machol & Lewin, Pommer began his film career in 1907, with the Berlin branch of the Gaumont company, eventually taking over as director of its Viennese branch in 1910. In 1912, Pommer concluded his military service and became a representative of the French Éclair camera company in Vienna, where he was responsible for film distribution to Central and Eastern Europe. In 1913, he became Éclair's general representative for Central Europe, Denmark, Sweden, Norway and Poland, based in Berlin. In the same year, he married Gertrud Levy and became, together with Marcel Vandal, the director-general of the Viennese office of Éclair. Under Pommer's direction, the company began the production of feature films including Das Geheimnis der Lüfte / Le mystère de l'air (in English, the Mystery of the Air), the first films he produced. Another five films followed in 1915.

With French capital from Éclair, and together with Fritz Holz, Pommer - while serving as a soldier in 1915 at the Western front - established the Deutsche "Eclair" Film- und Kinematographen-GmbH ("Deutsche Eclair" or Decla) in Berlin. Decla produced adventure and detective films, drama, and society pieces, as well as short film series. Its own Decla film distribution business, led by Hermann Saklikower, also presented foreign films. Pommer served in the First World War at the West and Eastern fronts, but injuries suffered in action led him to return to Berlin in 1916, where he was responsible for training recruits. Later, he worked for the Bild- und Filmamt (Bufa) at the German War Ministry.

After the 1919 merger of Decla with the Meinert-Film-Gesellschaft, Rudolf Meinert became head of production while Erich Pommer took charge of foreign distribution. Decla's production became more ambitious. The brands "Decla Abenteuerklasse" (producing, among others, Fritz Lang's Die Spinnen. 2. Teil: Das Brillantenschiff (The Spiders, Part 2: The Diamond Ship, 1920) and "Decla Weltklasse" (including The Cabinet of Dr. Caligari (1919), under the direction of Robert Wiene) were created.

Decla merged with Deutsche Bioskop AG to create Decla Bioskop AG, thus becoming in 1920 the second largest German film company after Ufa. Decla owned a studio in Neubabelsberg and a cinema chain. Two subsidiaries were formed: Uco-Film GmbH and Russo Films. The Uco Film GmbH, in whose establishment the Ullstein publishing house was involved, dedicated itself to filming serials from novels. Schloß Vogelöd / The Haunted Castle and Phantom, under the direction of F. W. Murnau, as well as Fritz Lang's Dr. Mabuse, the Gambler, were released. Russo Films focused on the adaptation of works of world literature. In a 1922 interview, Pommer stated that the international success of the German films would have to be linked to the production of quality pictures.

Pommer gathered around him talented directors (Carl Froelich and Fritz Wendhausen), script writers (Thea von Harbou, Carl Mayer, and Robert Liebmann), cameramen (Karl Freund, Carl Hoffmann, and Willy Hameister), architects (Walter Roehrig and Robert Herlth), as well as actors and actresses. In November 1921, Decla-Bioskop was taken over by Universum Film AG (Ufa), although it maintained a modicum of independence.

== Work with UFA ==
As a result of the merger with UFA, Erich Pommer not only continued as CEO of Decla-Bioskop, but also took over direction of Union-Film and Messter-Film. In early 1923, Pommer also joined the Ufa executive committee, to oversee all film production. At about the same time, he became the first chairman of the Central Organization of the German Film Industry (SPIO), which would shape German cinema during the Weimar Republic. The country's hyper inflation made expensive productions possible: at that time the work of several classical authors were adapted into movies, and internationally successful big budget films were released, including Der letzte Mann (The Last Laugh, 1924), Variety (1925), Faust (1926), and Manon Lescaut (1926).

Pommer led Ufa to unprecedented worldwide prestige. However, Pommer came to disagree with the policies of Ufa's new CEO Ferdinand Bausback, including the Parufamet agreement (which later proved disastrous for Ufa as Pommer had predicted). To save face, Bausback and the Ufa board blamed the company's troubles on increasing production costs, especially cost overruns of Fritz Lang's Metropolis (UFA's most expensive film to date), on Pommer himself.

== Paramount and MGM ==
In January 1926, Pommer resigned from Ufa, and a few months later, he left with his family for Hollywood. He was followed by a number of his production and acting team, including film directors Ludwig Berger, Paul Leni, E.A. Dupont, Lothar Mendes, and William Dieterle and actors Conrad Veidt, Emil Jannings, and Lya de Putti.

Working for Paramount Pictures, Pommer produced two films starring Pola Negri, Hotel Imperial and Barbed Wire (both 1927). He then was hired by Metro-Goldwyn-Mayer (MGM) to supervise all units involving foreign directors. His films at MGM included The Demi-Bride with Norma Shearer, California with Tim McCoy, and Mockery with Lon Chaney.

Meanwhile, Ufa had been acquired by the right-wing press magnate Alfred Hugenberg, and in July 1927, he sent Ufa's new CEO Ludwig Klitzsch to America to bring Pommer back to Germany. From the US, Pommer brought organizational and technical innovations, such as the use of shooting schedules and camera crane cars.

== Return to UFA ==
Pommer was given his own production unit at UFA, working under the overall control of the new head of production Ernst Hugo Correll, who effectively occupied Pommer's former role at the company. As head of the "Erich-Pommer-Produktion der Ufa" (Erich Pommer production of the Ufa), he produced Heimkehr (Homecoming) and Ungarische Rhapsodie (Hungarian Rhapsody, both 1928). His last silent productions were Asphalt directed by Joe May and Die wunderbare Lüge der Nina Petrowna starring Brigitte Helm and Franz Lederer

Pommer was a pioneer of sound film in Germany and of multiple language versions (MLV) as a means to cope with selling big productions to different countries: Melodie des Herzens / Melody of the Heart, made at the end of 1929 in Berlin, was produced in a German, English, French, Hungarian as well as a silent version. The film also created the Operetta film genre. The "Erich-Pommer-Produktion der Ufa" turned out several international box office hits in the following years, most notably Josef von Sternberg's The Blue Angel (1930), starring Marlene Dietrich. Among his productions was a series of popular musical comedies such as Die Drei von der Tankstelle and Der Kongreß tanzt / Congress Dances and the science fiction spectacle F.P.1, which was shot in three language versions.

== Exile and eventual return ==
After the Nazi Party came to power early in 1933, UFA rescinded Pommer's contract and he picked up an offer of Fox Film Corporation to build Fox Europa as its European arm in Paris, where he produced Max Ophüls' On a volé un homme (1933) and Fritz Lang's Liliom (1934), and then went on to Hollywood again. In 1936, he worked in the United Kingdom for Alexander Korda's London Films (Fire Over England 1936 and Farewell Again 1937). In 1936, he formed a film production company, The Mayflower Pictures Corporation, with actor Charles Laughton. Pommer not only produced but also directed their first film, Vessel of Wrath (also known as The Beachcomber), replacing Bartlett Cormack with the latter's agreement. Although Pommer subsequently received offers to direct and could have pursued a directing career, he preferred producing and never directed another film In 1938, Pommer produced St. Martin's Lane (via Mayflower Pictures) directed by Tim Whelan starring Laughton and Vivien Leigh and in 1939 Alfred Hitchcock's Jamaica Inn (also through Mayflower Pictures) again with Laughton and also introducing Maureen O'Hara in her first film. Pommer was in New York City for distribution negotiations when the Second World War broke out. Because he still held a German passport, he was unable to return to the United Kingdom and remained in the United States.

In 1939 he signed with RKO Radio Pictures, in Hollywood, for whom he produced two pictures, including Dance, Girl, Dance and They Knew What They Wanted. Becoming seriously ill in 1941 (he was a chain-smoker and suffered a heart attack), his contract with RKO was not renewed. Between 1942 and 1946, Pommer worked on a few film projects, some of which eventually went into production but without him. Pommer and his wife rented a small apartment and lived off the proceeds from the sale of personal valuables. They also helped two close friends, Fred Pinkus (a former business manager from Berlin) and his wife, silent movie star Eliza La Porta, who bought chinaware and glasses and then hand-painted them to sell to the higher-class department stores. Pommer's wife helped with the painting, and Pommer alternated with Pinkus to work the drying oven in Pinkus' garage. Having resided continuously in the United States since 1939, Pommer and his wife became naturalized American citizens in 1944.

In 1946, Pommer returned to Germany, where he became the highest-ranking film control officer of the Office of Military Government, United States (OMGUS) responsible for the reorganisation of the German film industry overseeing the reconstruction of studios and assigning production licenses. In spite of opposition from both Americans and Germans, Pommer rebuilt the German film industry from ashes. By 1948, a total of 28 feature films had been produced in West Germany under his supervision. Together with film director Curt Oertel and xHorst von Hartlieb, director of the film distribution association in Wiesbaden, Pommer also established a voluntary self-control system for the German motion picture industry, which evolved into the Freiwillige Selbstkontrolle der Filmwirtschaft (FSK), implementing a voluntary self-rating system for the movie industry modeled on the Hays Code in the USA. Establishment of this system (and the subsequent establishment of the FSK) avoided government regulation and censorship of the movie industry and replaced military censoring. In 1949 Pommer resigned his office, believing his work to be complete, and returned to the United States. He then attempted to launch Signature Pictures with Dorothy Arzner to produce American films in Europe, an endeavor that failed to obtain promised financing.

In 1951 he started the "Intercontinental Film GmbH" in Munich, making a few movies, including Nights on the Road (1951), which won the 1953 German Film Award, and Kinder, Mütter und ein General, which won the 1955 Golden Globe Award for Best Foreign Film and the 1956 Grand Prize of the Belgian Union of Cinema Critics.

However, restrictions forced on Pommer led him to resettle in California. Physically badly shaken (Pommer used a wheelchair after the amputation of a leg) his career as a producer was ended. He retired to live quietly with his wife. After his wife's death, he lived with his son's family. Pommer died in Los Angeles, California, in 1966.

== Awards ==
- 1953 German Film Award for "Nachts auf den Strassen".
- 1955 Golden Globe Award for Best Picture for "Kinder, Mütter, und ein General".
- 1956 Grand-Prix de l'Union de la Critique de Cinéma (UCC) for "Kinder, Mütter, und ein General".

== Films ==
- The Cabinet of Dr. Caligari (1920)
- The Haunted Castle (1921)
- Destiny (1921)
- Violet (1921)
- Dr. Mabuse, the Gambler (1922)
- The Last Laugh (1924)
- The Pleasure Garden (1925)
- Variety (1925)
- Faust (1926)
- Metropolis (1927)
- Spies (1928)
- The Blue Angel (1930)
- Liliom (1934)
- Music in the Air (1934)
- Fire Over England (1937)
- Vessel of Wrath (1938)
- St. Martin's Lane (1938)
- Jamaica Inn (1939)
- Dance, Girl, Dance (1940)
- They Knew What They Wanted (1940)
- Nights on the Road (1952)

== Bibliography ==
- Bock, Hans-Michael; Bergfelder, Tim, eds. (2009). The Concise CineGraph. Encyclopedia of German Cinema. New York, Oxford: Berghahn Books. ISBN 978-0-85745-565-9.
- Hardt, Ursula (1996). From Caligari to California: Erich Pommer's Life in the International Film Wars. Providence, RI: Berghahn. ISBN 978-1-57181-930-7.
- Grieveson, Lee; Krämer, Peter, eds. (2004). The Silent Cinema Reader. Psychology Press. ISBN 978-0-415-25284-3.
- Jacobsen, Wolfgang (1989). Erich Pommer: Ein Produzent macht Filmgeschichte. Berlin: Argon Verlag. ISBN 978-3-87024-148-3.
- Nowell-Smith, Geoffrey, ed. (2009). The Oxford History of World Cinema. Oxford University Press. ISBN 978-0-19-874242-5.
- Bezerra, Laura (2002). "Erich Pommer" (in German). Deutsches Film Institut. Archived from the original on 2007-09-27.
