= UFA GmbH =

German film company

- Formerly: Universum-Film Aktiengesellschaft (1917-1963); Universum Film (2002-2019) (Majority of the 2002-2019 distribution catalog sold to and merged with Tele Munchen Gruppe (now Leonine))
- Type: Subsidiary
- Industry: Motion picture
- Founded: 18 December 1917; 108 years ago, in Berlin, Germany
- Headquarters: Babelsberg, Potsdam, Brandenburg, Germany
- Area served: Worldwide
- Key people: Nico Hofmann (CEO)
- Products: Film; TV-film; TV series
- Production output: Film; TV program
- Parent: Bertelsmann (1964–1997); CLT-UFA (1997–2000); Fremantle (2000–present)
- Divisions: Fiction; Mitte; Serial Drama; Show & Factual; Documentary
- Website: www.ufa.de

UFA GmbH, shortened to UFA (German: [ˈuːfa]), is a film and television production company that unites all production activities of the media conglomerate Bertelsmann in Germany. The original UFA was established as Universum-Film Aktiengesellschaft on 18 December 1917, as a direct response to foreign competition in film and propaganda. UFA was founded by a consortium headed by Emil Georg von Stauß, a former Deutsche Bank board member. In March 1927, Alfred Hugenberg, an influential German media entrepreneur and later minister of the economy and minister of agriculture and nutrition in Adolf Hitler's cabinet, purchased UFA and transferred ownership of it to the Nazi Party in 1933.

In 1942, as a result of the Nazi policy of "forcible coordination" known as the Gleichschaltung, UFA and all of its competitors, including Tobis, Terra, Bavaria Film and Wien-Film, were bundled together with Nazi-controlled foreign film production companies to form the super-corporation UFA-Film GmbH (Ufi), with headquarters in Berlin. After the Red Army occupied the UFA complex in 1945 in Babelsberg, and after the privatization of Bavaria and UFA in 1956 in West Germany, the company was restructured to form Universum Film AG and taken over by a consortium of banks. However, in film production and distribution, it failed to revive and went into receivership.

In 1964, Bertelsmann's Chief Representative, Manfred Köhnlechner, acquired the entire Universum Film AG holdings from Deutsche Bank, which had previously been the main UFA shareholder and which had determined the company's business policy as head of the shareholders' consortium. Köhnlechner bought UFA, which was heavily in debt, on behalf of Reinhard Mohn for roughly five million Deutschmarks. (Köhnlechner: "The question came up as to why not take the entire thing, it still had many gems.") Only a few months later, Köhnlechner also acquired the UFA-Filmtheaterkette, a movie theater chain, for almost eleven million Deutschmarks.

In 1997, UFA and the Luxembourgish rival CLT established the joint venture CLT-UFA, which, following the takeover of British rival Pearson Television, was restructured as RTL Group in 2000. Now, UFA GmbH (UFA) works as a subsidiary of RTL Group's production division Fremantle, which had been formed out of Pearson TV, and is responsible for all production activities of Bertelsmann and Fremantle in Germany. Until August 2013, eight subsidiaries operated under the UFA umbrella: UFA Fernsehproduktion, UFA Entertainment, Grundy UFA, Grundy Light Entertainment, UFA Cinema, teamWorx, Phoenix Film and UFA Brand Communication.

In August 2013, UFA underwent an organizational restructuring that simplified the company down to three production divisions. Today, UFA Fiction, UFA Serial Drama, UFA Show & Factual and UFA Documentary are the four units responsible for production.

== History ==
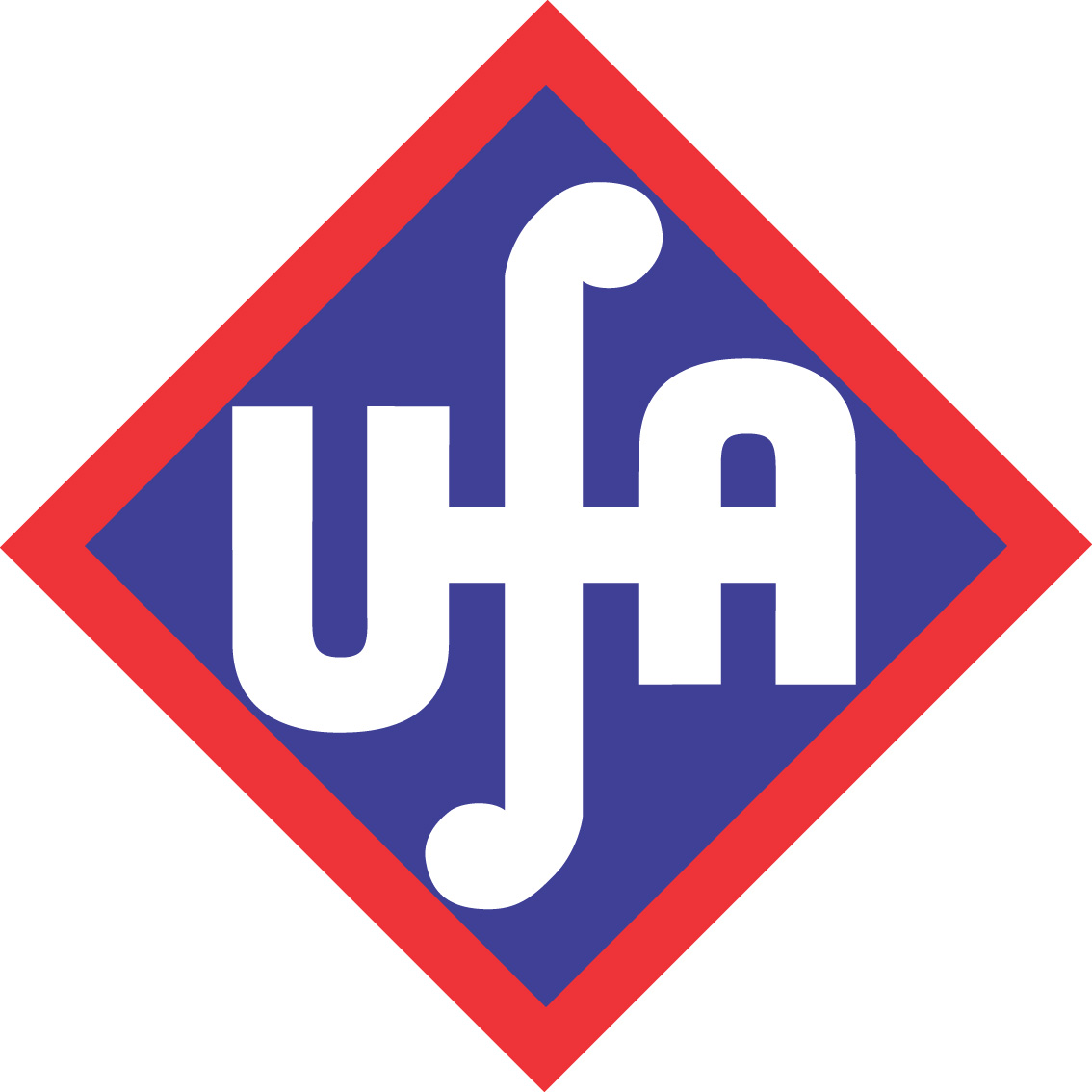
UFA logo (1917–1991)

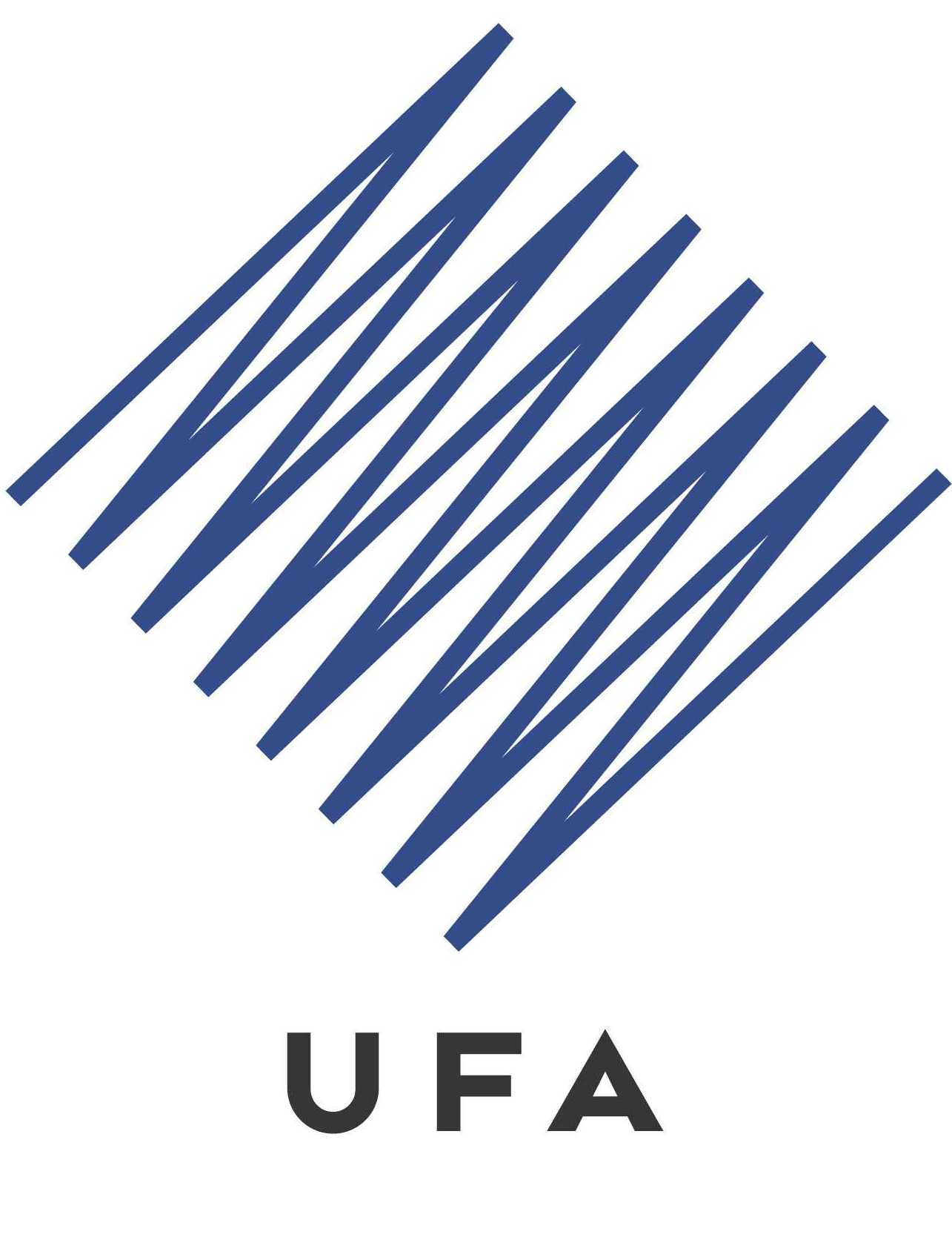
UFA logo (1991–2013)

=== Establishment from 1917 ===
An early step towards the founding of UFA was taken on 13 January 1917, with the creation of the Bild- und Filmamt (Bufa) by Germany's Supreme Army Command. Formed as a reaction to the perceived advantage of Germany's enemies in the realm of film propaganda, Bufa's task was to use film for psychological warfare.

The plans envisaged by the German General Staff – especially those of Erich Ludendorff – went far beyond the creation of Bufa. Ludendorff foresaw a large-scale, state-controlled film corporation that would serve national interests. In this spirit, Universum-Film AG (UFA) was founded as a consolidation of private film companies on 18 December 1917 in Berlin. The company's starting capital was 25 million Reichsmark (equivalent to €62 million in 2021): among the contributors were the German government, the War Ministry and Deutsche Bank. The board chairman of the new company was Deutsche Bank director Emil Georg von Stauß.

Prior to establishing the company, the General Staff had considered taking over the Deutsche Lichtbild-Gesellschaft e. V. (DLG), which had been founded in 1916. This agency was too much under the influence of heavy industry and, in particular, of Alfred Hugenberg, chairman of Krupp. Hugenberg would later take over UFA in 1927.

Three main film companies formed the nucleus of UFA from the end of 1917:

- Messter Film, owned by Oskar Messter, a dominant German producer
- PAGU (Projektions Union), originally formed by Paul Davidson in Frankfurt, with the Templehof Studios in Oberlandstraße in Berlin-Tempelhof and in Weissensee; and the Union-Theater (U.T. or U.T- Lichtspiele) chain of some 50 cinemas
- The entire German operation of Nordisk Film (founded in 1906 by Ole Olsen) including Nordische Films, the production company Oliver-Film of David Oliver, cinemas, and a distribution company, was bought by UFA in 1918

More companies joined UFA not long after:

- Joe May's May-Film company, with film duplicating plant and glass-house studios at Weissensee Studios (next door to PAGU). The studios were previously owned by Continental-Kunstfilm, whose production had slowed since 1915 and didn't join UFA.
- Greenbaum-Film (previously Vitascope before its brief merger with PAGU in January 1914) joined in 1919, but the deal was disastrous for Jules Greenbaum who died in a mental institution in 1924.
- Decla-Bioscop. Originally founded by Jules Greenbaum in 1902 as Deutsche Bioskop AG, sold to Carl Moritz Schleussner in 1908 and moved to Neubabelsberg); merged in March 1920 with Erich Pommer's Decla-Film which had been formed in 1915 out of the confiscated assets of the German branch of the French Éclair (Deutsche Éclair, thus Decla) to form Decla-Bioskop: Taken over by UFA in October 1921.

UFA continued to sign production agreements with various independent producers:

- Deulig from October 1920, previously Deutsche Lichtbild-Gesellschaft (DLG)
- Cserépy Film, founded by Arzén von Cserépy, merged with UFA in 1922
- Gloria-Film AG, founded by Hanns Lippmann
- Heinrich Bolten-Baeckers' BB-Film
- Rex-Film, founded in 1917 by Lupu Pick
- Fern-Andra Vertriebsgesellschaft, the film production company of Fern Andra
- Ossi-Oswalda-Film contracted to UFA from 1925
- The distributor Hansa-Film

=== Silent era (1918–1930) ===
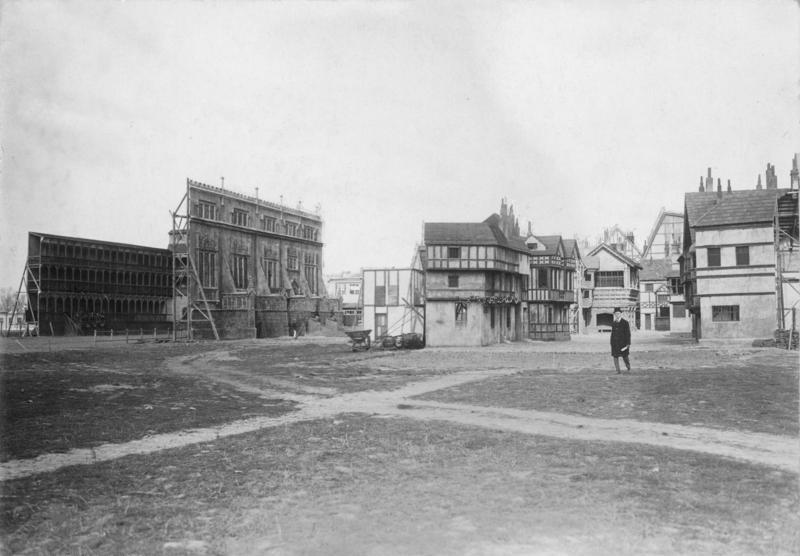
UFA film set at the Tempelhof Studios

Given that Germany had been – and continued to be – largely cut off from film imports due to World War I, the new company had ideal conditions for their conquest of the German market.

The mission of UFA at the time of its founding was the production of films – feature films, documentaries, cultural films and weekly headline (newsreel) films – designed to function as propaganda for Germany abroad. However, after mounting tensions between the company's founding members, Deutsche Bank was able to prevail and implement their approach to film production as a business rather than for military objectives. Instead of propaganda films, UFA now produced elaborate entertainment films such as Sumurun (Ernst Lubitsch, 1920).

UFA was already in 1921 producing the lion's share of German feature films, and in that year it was privatized. Starting in 1922, large ateliers in Neubabelsberg (today's Babelsberg Studio) and on Oberlandstraße in Berlin-Tempelhof were made available for film production. In 1926, the facilities were expanded by means of the construction of the largest studio hall in Europe at the time. In 1923, after Decla-Bioscop AG and others were taken over, Erich Pommer became head of all production operations and discovered and fostered many stars, including Emil Jannings, Pola Negri, Conrad Veidt and Lya de Putti. During this era UFA was a leader in the time of the German Expressionism, experienced a further boom, and emerged as a direct competitor to Hollywood with films such as Dr. Mabuse the Gambler (1922), Die Nibelungen (1924), Variety (1925) and Faust (1926).

=== Hugenberg (1927–1933) ===
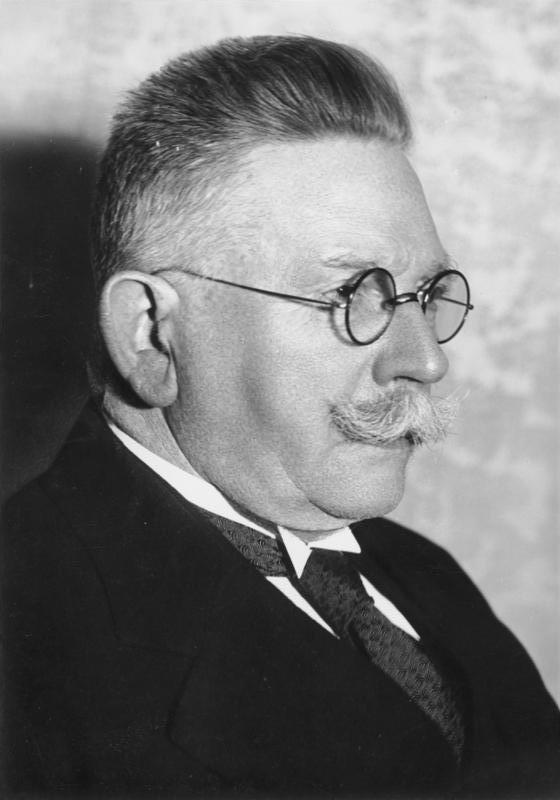
Alfred Hugenberg

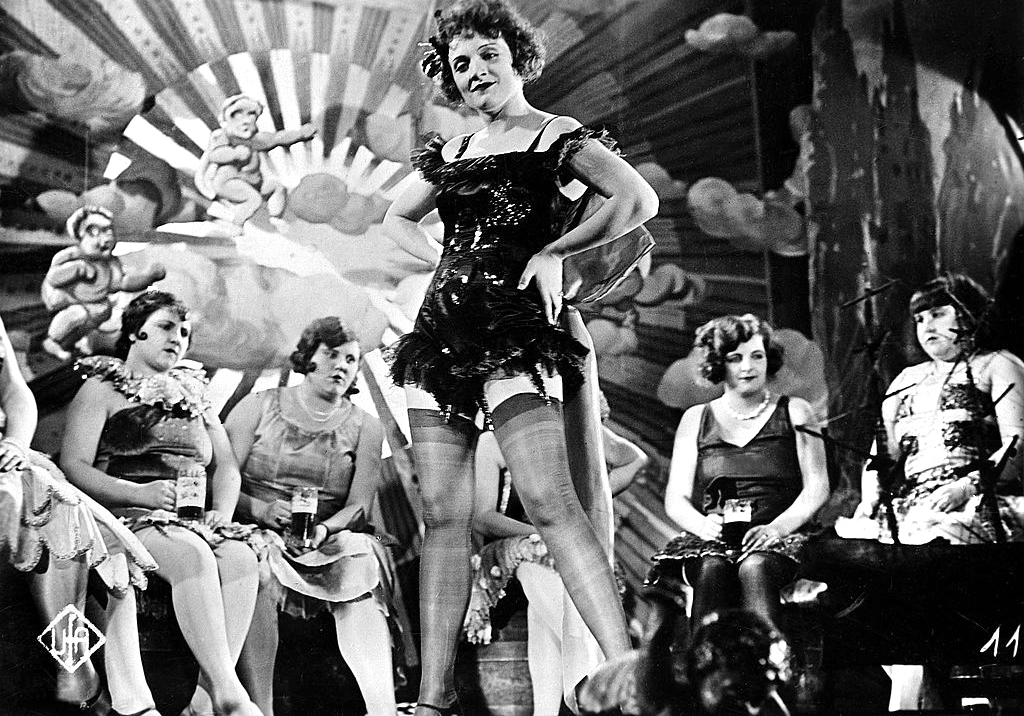
Promotional photo of Marlene Dietrich in The Blue Angel (1930), with UFA logo at lower left

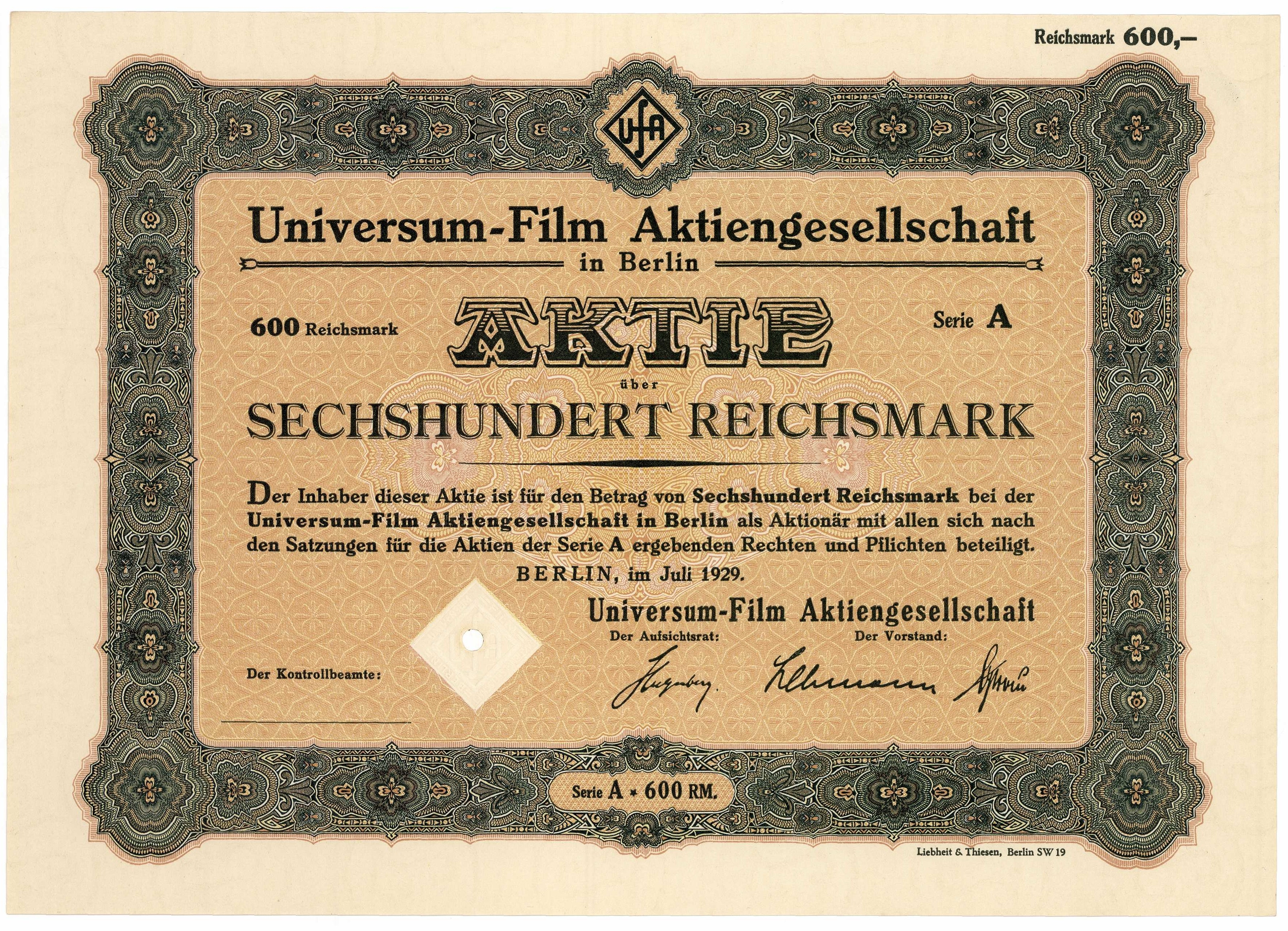
Share of the Universum-Film AG, issued July 1929, signed by Hugenberg

In 1927, UFA found itself in serious financial trouble. After the stabilization of the German currency starting in November 1924, the German film industry in general entered a period of crisis: foreign sales stalled due to low profit margins, and the German market became profitable once again for American film giants. The resulting concentration on a few large German film companies, which came together to unite production, distribution and presentation under one UFA's managers made severe miscalculations with regard to two large-scale productions, Nibelungen and Metropolis in 1924-1926. This situation was made even worse as the result of a gag contract (the Parufamet agreement) they had entered into in 1925 with the American companies Paramount Pictures and Metro-Goldwyn-Mayer. In March 1927, with the company facing bankruptcy, Alfred Hugenberg – Chairman of the German National People's Party and owner of the Scherl-Gruppe, a powerful media corporation – bought the company. The new general director was Ludwig Klitzsch; Hugenberg himself took over the chairmanship of the supervisory board; his deputy was banker Emil Georg von Stauß.

At first, nothing changed in UFA's production policy. In 1928, Erich Pommer was replaced as head of production by Ernst Hugo Correll, who led the company through the transition to talking pictures or "talkies". UFA gained an advantage over smaller companies in the realm of talkie production as a result of a contract with Tobis-Klangfilm, which simplified the licensing situation for UFA. (Note: UFA had acquired the German rights for an early sound film system, Tri-Ergon, in 1924. The Tonbild Syndicate AG (Tobis) - with German, Swiss and Dutch backing - acquired the Tri-Ergon rights in 1928, and merged with Klangfilm (a partnership between Siemens & Halske, AEG, and a Dutch recording company) to form Tobis-Klangfilm in March 1929. Source: Gomery 1976, pp. 53–54.)

Nevertheless, UFA has recorded unsurpassed artistic successes with films such as Fritz Lang's Metropolis (inscribed on UNESCO's Memory of the World Register, the first film thus distinguished) and Woman in the Moon to this day. Asphalt (German Realism) or entertainment movies such as Melody of the Heart or the musical film The Three from the Filling Station are produced by the UFA. In 1930, the company enjoyed worldwide success with the film The Blue Angel, starring Marlene Dietrich and Emil Jannings, directed by Joseph von Sternberg.

== Nazi era ==
=== Gleichschaltung (1933–1937) ===
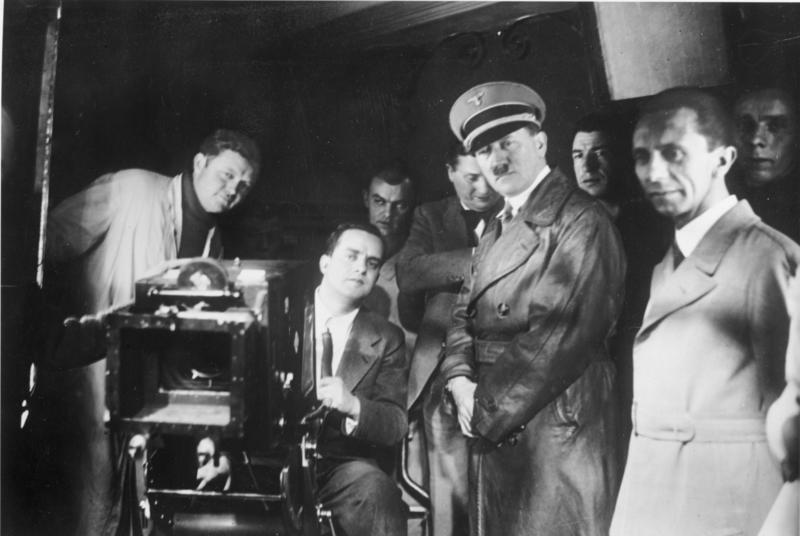
Hitler and Goebbels visit UFA in 1935.

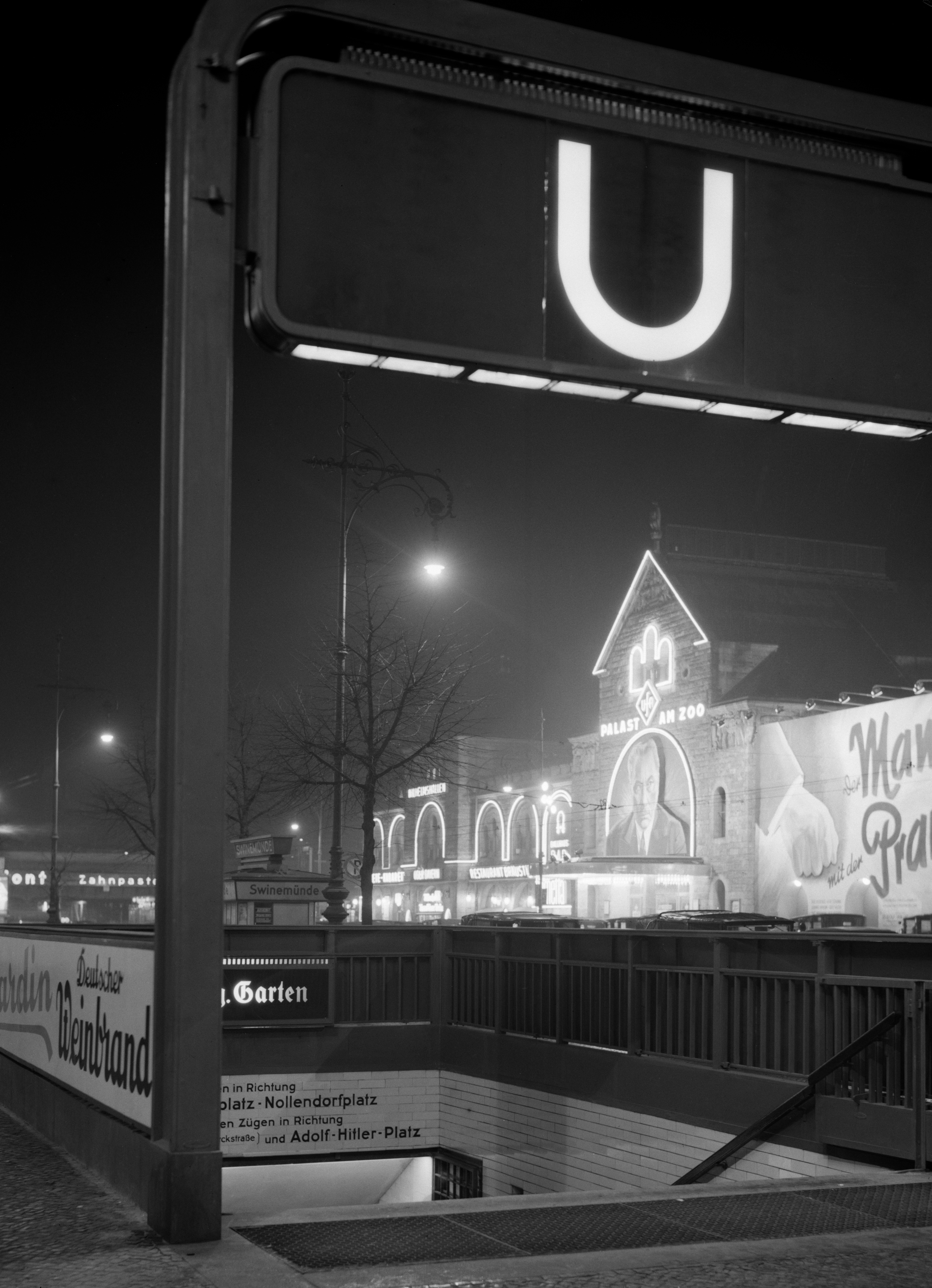
A typical "UFA-Palast" in Berlin in the mid-1930s (photo by Willem van de Poll)

During the Gleichschaltung (Nazification), UFA experienced a new commercial boom, not least due to the government's protectionist measures, which freed the company from bothersome domestic and foreign competition, sometimes even incorporating their production facilities and staff (see also: National Socialist Film Policy). On top of that, by occupying almost all of Europe, the Nazi regime also provided UFA with new sales markets, as well as placing distribution outlets in such "neutral" countries as the United States. By 1938, after taking over foreign film production facilities in France, Belgium and other countries, one third of the company's sales came from abroad. UFA's economic boom made it possible to further expand the so-called "star system," which had already been developed in the silent film era. The highest paid UFA stars in the Nazi era were Hans Albers and Zarah Leander. Veit Harlan was the highest-earning director.

In addition, as a result of the nationalist German spirit that already dominated the company, UFA was perfectly suited to serve the goals of National Socialist propaganda in film. Hugenberg had been named Reich Minister of Economics immediately following the Nazi takeover of 30 January 1933, and made UFA openly available for Joseph Goebbels' propaganda machine, even though Hugenberg was removed from his post shortly thereafter (June 1933) under pressure from Hitler. In an act of anticipatory obedience to the Nazi regime, UFA management fired several Jewish employees on 29 March 1933. In the summer of 1933, the Nazi regime created the Film Chamber of the Reich, which adopted regulations officially excluding Jewish filmmakers from all German studios.

=== Nationalization (1937–1941) ===
In 1936, Germany's first film institute was founded in the form of the UFA-Lehrschau set up by Hans Traub at the Babelsberg Film Complex. Goebbels systematically brought UFA and all other media companies under the control of his Propaganda Ministry. On 18 March 1937, the Hugenberg Company was forced to sell all of its UFA shares for 21.25 million Reichsmark (equivalent to €95 million in 2021) to Cautio Treuhand GmbH, a quasi-governmental holding company that answered to Goebbels. This move meant that UFA was effectively nationalized. Emil Georg von Stauß was named Chairman of the Supervisory Committee, Ludwig Klitzsch remained general director, and Carl Opitz was named press officer. In May, an art committee headed by Carl Froelich – but in fact controlled by Goebbels – was founded. This committee proceeded to have a direct influence on UFA's production planning; it also severely curtailed the work of production head Ernst Hugo Correll. In 1939, Correll was fired after refusing to join the Nazi Party.

At the time of its nationalization, among the production facilities belonging to UFA were 27 film studios, nine of which were in Neubabelsberg (Potsdam-Babelsberg), and seven of which were in Berlin-Tempelhof, including three that belonged to Carl Froelich-Film GmbH in name only. UFA also had two dubbing studios, a mixing studio, two animation studios, two ateliers for advertising films, one for cartoons and a small training atelier.

=== State film monopoly: UFI (1942–1945) ===
On 10 January 1942, UFA officially became the subsidiary of UFA-Film GmbH (UFI), into which all German film production was merged. Other companies were dissolved or integrated into UFA at the time, including Bavaria Film, Berlin-Film, Terra Film and Tobis AG, which became additional production units. Film production in the captured nations was also brought under its aegis. Profits reached 155 million Reichsmarks in 1942 (equivalent to €649,828,997 in 2021) and ℛℳ 175 million in 1943 (equivalent to €715,085,619 in 2021).

At this point, the UFA staff hierarchy was reorganized according to the Nazi Führer principle. The coordination of individual sub-groups of the UFI Corporation was the job of the newly appointed Reich Film Director-General. The production heads worked for the administrative director general and were responsible for the overall planning of annual programming and content design all the way up to the actual shooting of the film: these heads were also responsible for giving instructions to the film line producers and directors. It was subsequently fully nationalized in mid-1944.

== Post-war period: Dissolution and Sovietization vs. re-privatization ==
In late April 1945, the UFA ateliers in Potsdam-Babelsberg and Berlin-Tempelhof were occupied by the Red Army. After the German Wehrmacht issued its unconditional surrender on 7 & 9 May, 1945, the Military Government Law No. 191 initially halted and prohibited all further film production. On 14 July 1945, as a result of Military Government Law No. 52, all Reich-owned film assets of UFI Holding were seized. All activities in the film industry were placed under strict licensing regulations and all films were subject to censorship.

The Soviet military government, which was in favour of a speedy reconstruction of the German film industry under Soviet supervision, incorporated the Babelsberg ateliers into DEFA, the state-run film studio, subsequently the GDR's state film studio, on 17 May 1946. The Murderers Are Among Us was the first German feature film in the post-war era and the first so-called Trümmerfilm (German for 'Rubble Film'). It was shot in 1945–1946 by DEFA in the Althoff Studios in Babelsberg and the Jofa ateliers in Berlin-Johannisthal. Wolfgang Staudte directed the film and also wrote the screenplay. Additionally, the Soviets confiscated numerous UFA productions from the Babelsburg vaults and dubbed them into Russian for release in the USSR; and simultaneously began importing Soviet films to the same offices for dubbing into German and distribution to the surviving German theaters.

In contrast, the main film-policy goal of the Allied occupying forces, under American insistence, consisted in preventing any future accumulation of power in the German film industry. The Western powers also had more interest in opening up the German film market for their own products rather than in letting the national film industry regain its foothold. Thus the reorganization of Germany's film industry outside the Soviet zone was very slow, in spite of the "Lex UFI" law issued in September 1949 by the American and British military regime and the Dissolution Law (June 1953) issued by the German Bundestag. The status of UFA was furthermore controversial, with doubts about whether it should be allowed to resume operations at all because of its identification with Nazi film production. Motion pictures produced after the war in the Allied zones were, for a decade, made by other, fledgling companies.

It was 1956 by the time Bavaria was outsourced and the remaining UFA re-privatized. A bank consortium led by Deutsche Bank was behind the founding of the new Universum-Film AG, whose production facilities included the Afifa-Kopierwerk and the ateliers in Berlin-Tempelhof. Its first board chairman was Arno Hauke who, until then, had been the General Trustee for UFI assets in the British zone. The first film made by Universum-Film AG, a short documentary film called Am Seidenen Faden, came out in 1955. In 1958, the first UFA feature film Stefanie came out: it starred Sabine Sinjen and was directed by Josef von Baky, who had directed the UFA's large-scale 25th anniversary film Münchhausen in 1942. In 1969, after ten further feature films directed by leading artists such as Curtis Bernhardt, William Dieterle, Helmut Käutner and Wolfgang Liebeneiner – as well as such newcomers as Peter Beauvais, Rolf von Sydow and Georg Tressler – feature film production at UFA was ended.

=== Bertelsmann (starting in 1964) ===
In 1964, Bertelsmann acquired Universum-Film AG and all other divisions of UFA-Theater AG. In order to prevent the sale of film rights belonging to the old UFA, the Friedrich Wilhelm Murnau Foundation was set up in Wiesbaden on the initiative of the German Federal Government and representatives of the film industry. In 1966, the foundation acquired the rights to UFA and Bavaria Film – and they have been administering, storing and restoring ever since. In 1972, the Riech Group acquired UFA-Theater AG and continued operating the company with a license from Bertelsmann under the UFA's trademark rhombus logo. The right to the UFA name remains, however, with Bertelsmann. Under the management of Werner Mietzner, the company experienced a renaissance in productions at UFA Fernsehproduktion. With the launch of private television in 1984, the Bertelsmann Group brought together its film and TV activities in a new holding – the UFA Film und Fernseh GmbH in Hamburg – which also held investments in radio and TV stations such as RTL and Premiere. They also established and marketed new film and sports rights.

The production companies belonging to UFA Berlin have been under the management of Wolf Bauer, Norbert Sauer and Axel Reick since autumn 1991. Using the rhombus logo again, this team developed UFA Film & TV Produktion into the largest production company in Germany, now written in capital letters UFA. UFA's many prize-winning TV films, light entertainment formats, popular soap operas, long-running TV series, sitcoms and non-fiction programs have made it the leader on the German television market. The company broadcasts over 2,800 hours of content each year. In early 1997, the holding society UFA Hamburg (today Cologne) merged with CLT in Luxemburg to form CLT-UFA. April 2000 saw a merger with Pearson TV and the creation of the RTL Group, in which Bertelsmann has held the majority (90.4%) since late 2001. All worldwide production activities of the RTL Group are consolidated in FremantleMedia, and UFA is the holding company of all FremantleMedia's production activities in Germany. UFAInteractive, a small subsidiary directly associated with the holding company, was created to fulfill UFA's need for constant innovation (e.g. program content for mobile devices and special-interest channels) as well as to assist the larger companies independently in an advisory function.

On 9 August 2013, the company underwent a major restructuring based on the new strategic goal and concept of "One UFA". UFA's organizational structure was simplified down to three production units.

==== Production units ====
- UFA Fiction
- UFA Serial Drama
- UFA Show & Factual

==== Former subsidiaries ====
- UFA Cinema GmbH
- UFA brand communication GmbH
- UFA Entertainment
- UFA Fernsehproduktion, Phoenix Film, teamWorx
- UFA Filmproduktion
- UFA Film- & Medienproduktion GmbH
- UFA Interactive
- GRUNDY Light Entertainment GmbH
- Grundy UFA (Grundy UFA Baleares, Magyar Grundy UFA)
- Passion
- Universum Film GmbH (since 2019 owned by KKR, renamed as Leonine Distribution in 2020)

== Popular films from the 1920s to the 1940s ==
UFA experienced a golden age in cinema from the 1920s to the 1940s. In this period, the company contributed significantly to the history of German film. The following are among UFA's most famous productions from those years:

- 1922: Dr. Mabuse the Gambler (directed by Fritz Lang)
- 1924: Die Nibelungen (directed by Fritz Lang)
- 1924: The Last Laugh (directed by F. W. Murnau; invention of the Unchained camera technique)
- 1927: Metropolis (directed by Fritz Lang; first feature science fiction film)
- 1929: Woman in the Moon (directed by Fritz Lang; invention of the countdown)
- 1930: The Blue Angel (directed by Josef von Sternberg)
- 1930: The Three from the Filling Station (directed by Wilhelm Thiele)
- 1930: Burglars (directed by Hanns Schwarz)
- 1931: Der Kongreß tanzt (directed by Erik Charell)
- 1931: The Man in Search of His Murderer (directed by Robert Siodmak)
- 1931: Bombs on Monte Carlo (directed by Hanns Schwarz)
- 1931: My Wife, the Impostor (directed by Kurt Gerron)
- 1932: Things Are Getting Better Already (directed by Kurt Gerron)
- 1933: The Empress and I (directed by Friedrich Hollaender)
- 1935: Triumph of the Will (directed by Leni Riefenstahl)
- 1937: The Man Who Was Sherlock Holmes (directed by Karl Hartl)
- 1938: Faded Melody (directed by Viktor Tourjansky)
- 1941: Women Are Better Diplomats (directed by Georg Jacoby; Germany's first feature film in color, Agfacolor)
- 1943: Münchhausen (directed by Josef von Báky; feature film in color celebrating UFA's 25th anniversary)
- 1944: Die Feuerzangenbowle (directed by Helmut Weiss)
- 1945: Kolberg (directed by Veit Harlan; monumental propaganda film shortly before the fall of the Third Reich)
- 1945: Under the Bridges (directed by Helmut Käutner)

== Leading UFA directors ==
The following are among the most successful UFA directors in the silent era and early talkie period: Ludwig Berger, Paul Czinner, Wilhelm Dieterle, Ewald André Dupont, Karl Grune, Fritz Lang, Ernst Lubitsch, Joe May, Friedrich Wilhelm Murnau, Arthur Robison, Hanns Schwarz, Paul L. Stein, Wilhelm Thiele, Alfred Zeisler.

Between 1933 and 1942, the following were house directors at UFA: Carl Boese, Eduard von Borsody, Peter Paul Brauer, Karl Hartl, Georg Jacoby, Gerhard Lamprecht, Herbert Maisch, Paul Martin, Karl Ritter, Reinhold Schünzel (until 1936), Douglas Sirk (until 1937), Hans Steinhoff, Robert A. Stemmle, Viktor Tourjansky, Gustav Ucicky und Erich Waschneck.

== See also ==
- Studio Babelsberg, studio history and notable productions
- List of films featuring Berlin
- Film studios in Berlin-Tempelhof: Oberlandstraße (Berlin)

== Sources ==
- Borgelt, Hans (1993). Die UFA, ein Traum - 100 Jahre deutscher Film (in German). edition q Verlag. ISBN 3-86124-178-1.
- Bock, Hans-Michael (1992). Das UFA-Buch (in German). zweitausendeins. ISBN 3-86150-065-5.
- Gandert, Gero (1993). Der Film der Weimarer Republik / 1929 (in German). (with Stiftung Deutsche Kinemathek). Walter de Gruyter. ISBN 9783110852615.
- Gomery, Douglas (1976). "Tri-Ergon, Tobis-Klangfilm, and the Coming of Sound". Cinema Journal. 16 (1). University of Texas Press, on behalf of the Society for Cinema & Media Studies. JSTOR 1225449.
- Hampicke, Evelyn (1996). "The Danish influence: David Oliver and Nordisk in Germany". In Elsaesser, Thomas; Wedel, Michael (eds.). A second life: German cinema’s first decades. Amsterdam University Press. ISBN 9053561838.
- Hampicke, Evelyn (2015). "Jules Greenbaum". CineGraph – Lexikon zum deutschsprachigen Film (in German). Cinegraph.de. Archived from the original on 5 May 2016.
- Kracauer, Siegfried (1947). From Caligari to Hitler: a psychological history of the German film. Princeton University Press.
- Kreimeier, Klaus (1999). The UFA Story: A History of Germany's Greatest Film Company, 1918-1945. University of California Press. ISBN 9780520220690.
- Prawer, Siegbert Salomon (2005). Between two worlds: The Jewish presence in German and Austrian film, 1910–1933. Berghahn Books. ISBN 9781845453039.
- Taylor, Richard (1998). Film Propaganda: Soviet Russia and Nazi Germany. I.B.Tauris. ISBN 9781860641671.
