= Bomben auf Monte Carlo =

Bomben auf Monte Carlo may refer to:

- Bomben auf Monte Carlo (novel), a 1930 novel
- Bombs on Monte Carlo (1931 film), a German film adaptation
- Captain Craddock, a 1931 French-language version
- Monte Carlo Madness, a 1932 English-language version
- Bombs on Monte Carlo (1960 film), a German film
