= Harmony (musical) =

Musical by Barry Manilow and Bruce Sussman

- A New Musical
- Poster for the planned Broadway production
- Music: Barry Manilow
- Lyrics: Bruce Sussman
- Book: Bruce Sussman
- Basis: The life of the Comedian Harmonists
- Premiere: October 7, 1997: Mandell Weiss Theatre, San Diego
- Productions: 1997 La Jolla Playhouse; 2013 Atlanta; 2014 Los Angeles; 2022 Off-Broadway; 2023 Broadway

Harmony is a stage musical with music by Barry Manilow and book and lyrics by Bruce Sussman. The musical tells the true story of the Comedian Harmonists, an ensemble of six young men in 1920s Germany who took the world by storm with their blend of sophisticated close harmonies and uproarious stage antics, until their inclusion of Jewish singers put them on a collision course with history.

The musical premiered at La Jolla Playhouse in the Mandell Weiss Theatre, in 1997. A planned Broadway production was slated for 2004, but due to lack of funds, it was ultimately canceled. The production opened in Atlanta in 2013, and Los Angeles in 2014, before an Off-Broadway production opened in April 2022. A Broadway transfer opened in November 2023 starring Chip Zien and Sierra Boggess. It closed on February 4, 2024.

== Productions ==
=== San Diego (1997) ===
In February 1997, Harmony was announced to start previews on October 7, 1997, in the Mandell Weiss Theatre at La Jolla Playhouse. It was created by Barry Manilow, with book and lyrics by Bruce Sussman. It opened on October 19, 1997, and closed on November 30, 1997. The entire production received mixed reviews, and was three hours in length.

David Warren directed the production, with set design by Derek McLane, costume design by Mark Wendland, sound design by Steve Canyon Kennedy and lighting by Ken Posner. Danny Burstein originated the role of Rabbi. Other cast members include Mark Chmiel as Lesh, James Clow as Bobby, Steven Goldstein as Erich, Thom Christopher Warren as Harry, Patrick Wilson as Chopin, Rebecca Luker as Mary and Janet Metz as Ruth.

An out-of-town try-out in Philadelphia, Pennsylvania, was slated for opening on December 17, 2003, with previews on November 25, 2003. A Broadway run was also planned for 2004. Previews for the Philadelphia try-out was delayed to December 2, 2003, with opening on December 10, 2003 due to delivery issues. Both productions were canceled following an announcement on November 13, 2003, due to lack of funds.

=== Atlanta and Los Angeles (2013, 2014) ===
After winning back the rights to the musical in 2005, Manilow and Sussman chose to run the musical at the Alliance Theatre in Atlanta, Georgia. It ran from September 6, 2013, and closed on October 6, 2013. It then ran at the Ahmanson Theatre in Los Angeles, California, from March 4, 2014, closing on April 13, 2014.

=== Off-Broadway (2022) ===
Harmony was planned to debut Off-Broadway at the Museum of Jewish Heritage in New York City, New York, on February 9, 2020, closing on March 29, 2020. The opening was subsequently delayed to February 11, 2021 and then again delayed to 2022. Previews began on March 23, 2022, opening on April 13, 2022 and ran until May 8, 2022.

Warren Carlyle directed and choreographed the production, with scenic design by Beowulf Boritt, costume design by Linda Cho, sound design by Dan Moses Schreier and lighting by Jules Fisher and Peggy Eisenhauer. Sara Edwards would also choreograph the Off-Broadway production. Danny Kornfield portrayed Rabbi, with Steve Telsey playing Lesh, Sean Bell as Bobby, Eric Peters as Erich, Zal Owen as Harry, Blake Roman as Chopin, Sierra Boggess as Mary, Jessie Davidson as Ruth and Chip Zien as Older Rabbi.

=== Broadway (2023-2024) ===
A Broadway production of Harmony opened in 2023. Previews began at the Ethel Barrymore Theatre on October 18, 2023, with an opening night of November 13, 2023. Warren Carlyle again directed and choreographed the production. Kornfeld, Telsey, Bell, Peters, Owen, Roman, Boggess and Zien reprised their roles, while Julie Benko originated the role of Ruth on Broadway. An original cast album was released on August 31, 2023.

The production played its final performance on February 4, 2024. It was not able to recoup the $15 million for which it was capitalized.

=== Post Broadway ===
On April 26 2025 it was announced that Hale Center Theater in Sandy Utah would produce the first regional production since the shows Broadway transfer. The production (Directed by Dave Tinney.) opened on HCT’s Sorenson Legacy Jewel Box Stage on May 25 2026 and ran until August 1 2026. The second regional production was announced in March 2026 and was scheduled to run at Music Theatre of Connecticut in Norwalk, CT, that September. The cast included OBC ensemble member and Harry and Young Rabbi cover Constantine Pappas, who played Young Rabbi.

== Cast and characters ==
Character	San Diego	Atlanta	Los Angeles	Off-Broadway	Broadway
Character	1997	2013	2014	2022	2023
"Rabbi" Josef Roman Cycowski (Note: Prior to the 2022 Off-Broadway production, one actor played Rabbi as both a young man and an old man.)	—N/a	—N/a	—N/a	Chip Zien	Chip Zien
Mary Hegel	Rebecca Luker	Leigh Ann Larkin	Leigh Ann Larkin	Sierra Boggess	Sierra Boggess
Ruth Stern	Janet Metz	Hannah Corneau	Hannah Corneau	Jessie Davidson	Julie Benko
Bobby Biberti	James Clow	Douglas Williams	Douglas Williams	Sean Bell	Sean Bell
Young "Rabbi"	Danny Burstein	Shayne Kennon	Shayne Kennon	Danny Kornfeld	Danny Kornfeld
Harry Frommerman	Thom Christopher Warren	Tony Yazbeck	Matt Bailey	Zal Owen	Zal Owen
Erich Collin	Steven Goldstein	Chris Dwan	Chris Dwan	Eric Peters	Eric Peters
Erwin "Chopin" Bootz	Patrick Wilson	Will Taylor	Will Taylor	Blake Roman	Blake Roman
Ari "Lesh" Leshnikoff	Mark Chmiel	Will Blum	Will Blum	Steven Telsey	Steven Telsey
Josephine Baker	Thursday Farrar	—N/a	—N/a	Ana Hoffman	Allison Semmes
Marlene Dietrich (Note: In the off-Broadway production, this role was played by the actor playing the older Rabbi; the character was eliminated completely for the Broadway production.)	Jodi Stevens	Lauren Elaine Taylor	Lauren Elaine Taylor	Chip Zien	Kayleen Seidl
Standartenfϋhrer	Kurt Ziskie	Chad Lindsey	Chad Lindsey	Andrew O'Shanick	Andrew O'Shanick

== Synopsis ==
Act I

The show starts with an old Rabbi recounting his days in the Comedian Harmonists. Rabbi recounts that he was in the group and we hear them sing together in "Harmony". We see them holding the auditions and the various members joining the group- Young Rabbi, Bobby, Erich, Lesh, Harry, and Chopin. Mary is a Christian seamstress, dating the Jewish Young Rabbi. She ponders on the future world and how the area around her is changing. ("What Do You See?") Mary wonders to Young Rabbi whether they can make it. Young Rabbi assures her it’s not so bad out there and they are in love and can move forward. Meanwhile the Harmonists have gotten an audition at a nice club, this could potentially be their big break. We also meet Ruth, a Jew who is dating the Christian Chopin. Ruth is a fiery revolutionist with communist ideals- Mary makes her a red coat and the boys go to support her at a rally with Chopin donning a red scarf to support her. (“This is Our Time”) With the Harmonists getting a spot to play at the nice club, Erich is now concerned because his parents are quite wealthy, so it would get back to them that he played at the club from people who saw him. He is a doctor, so him starting to devote his career to singing is a big change. In this song, he practices telling his parents the news with the other boys acting as his parents and coming up with different reactions. (“Your Son is Becoming a Singer”) We go back to Mary and Young Rabbi. Things have gotten worse for Jews around Germany. Mary is concerned that they are setting themselves up for failure. Young Rabbi assures her that they will fight for each other and proposes marriage. (“Every Single Day”) The harmonists go to the club for their big performance. (“How Can I Serve You Madam?”) It turns out someone has broken into their dressing room since the tuxes for their performance are made by a Jewish shop owner. They end up performing a more comedic styled performance without pants in big jackets with water spraying effects. It’s a huge hit, and the Harmonists become the Comedian Harmonists and incorporate comedy and parody into their acts. This quickly takes off and they become hugely popular. We see Young Rabbi and Mary and Ruth and Chopin get married. ("The Wedding") They perform traditional Jewish wedding customs, but at the end, someone runs up the aisle and breaks the glass of the synagogue. The group and Mary go on a European tour and go to America to play Carnegie Hall. ("Home") They are extremely successful and meet tons of celebrities along the way. This tour is contrasted with images on stage of Nazi propaganda depicting the Nazi rise to power in Germany. The group is largely shielded from this as they are away overseas. They run into Albert Einstein (played by the Old Rabbi in a wig). Einstein talks about how bad things have gotten and how he’s never going back. The group gets an offer to stay in the US and host a radio show and do a regular show with the famous Josephine Baker. They debate it, but Bobby is insistent that everybody loves them more at home and they should go back where they have come from. The group eventually gives in to Bobby. Old Rabbi reminisces and wishes they had stayed.

Act II

In a “what if” scenario, we see the group perform with Josephine Baker in a raucous upbeat number ("We're Goin' Loco!"). Rabbi tells us this is what could have been, but they went back. The group has a big performance, performing an original song that uses some Jewish folk music in it ("Hungarian Rhapsody #20"). At this point, we see a Nazi officer and his wife come and sit in the audience. Some anti-Jewish protesters stand up and yell slurs from the balcony at the performance. The Nazi reprimands them and the group finishes their performance. The Nazi then comes up onstage and compliments them on their performance, getting them to sign his album. All of the men are clearly uncomfortable, and Harry (who is Jewish) is somewhat removed. The boys thank the Nazi for defending them, and the Nazi tells them the party actually is in favor of them because it shows they are friendly to culture and let a band with Jewish members perform. Ruth, who is backstage with the group, suddenly loses her temper and is held back by the boys. Finally, Harry is given the album to sign, and the Nazi wipes the pen with a cloth rather than touch it after Harry. He then inquires about Ruth, but the boys don’t give him her information. Before leaving, the Nazi tells the group not to play that song again since it has Jewish folk music. The group has started performing based on where the Nazis would like them to, with the Nazi party controlling their travel and movement. They do a performance at Tivoli Gardens in Copenhagen, which they decide to speak back a little. They perform the whole number as a fake advertisement for Germany, while dressed as puppets on strings, with a rather ominous ending. ("Come to the Fatherland") Jewish passports are destroyed, and the Jews are trapped in Germany. The boys and Mary start plotting an escape. They are going to try to build up some cash from performances so they can get out. Mary tells this to Ruth, who hasn’t heard the plans. Young Rabbi comes to Mary and tells her she doesn’t have to escape if she doesn’t want to, he doesn’t want to force her from her home. Mary emphasizes that wherever Rabbi goes she will follow him. (“Where You Go”) Ruth confronts Chopin about the escape plans. He says he can’t do it, and she will leave alone, essentially ending their marriage. She tells him that she will be with him in spirit, that just because he ends their relationship he can’t ignore the horrors occurring. After Ruth walks away, we hear from a Nazi she was arrested. We also find out Erich is Jewish and has been hiding it from the group, but the Nazis know. The group does a film performance to get the cash for the escape (“In This World”). Chopin is singing, but it is a love song and he is remembering Ruth and getting sad. The film ends up stopping production due to Jewish members. The group discusses how to move forward, they don’t have enough cash for all of them and with Jewish members they are now struggling to work. It is decided that they will split up - Mary, Young Rabbi, Erich, and Harry will escape leaving the other three behind. They are on a train when they determine this, and hear that Hitler is on the train ("Threnody"). Old Rabbi discusses how he should have done something at that moment- Hitler walks right by them and he feels he should have attempted to attack him, and maybe that would have changed their fate. He reflects on all the little moments that could have caused their current pain to be avoided. The group eventually does escape, and those that stay in Germany survive the war, except for presumably Ruth (we never know what happens except that Chopin kept looking for her and could not find her). They were banned from performing before they escaped, and all of their records were destroyed. Rabbi is the last surviving member of the group, and he recounts how each of the members lived out their days and how he is the one cursed with remembering and retelling the tragic tale. ("Stars in the Night")

== Musical numbers ==
Act I

- "Harmony" – Older Rabbi and Comedian Harmonists
- "And What Do You See?" – Mary
- "This Is Our Time" – Young Rabbi, Mary, Ruth, Harry, The Group, and Ralliers
- "Your Son Is Becoming a Singer" – Erich and Comedian Harmonists
- "Every Single Day" – Young Rabbi
- "How Can I Serve You Madame?" – Lesh and Comedian Harmonists
- "The Wedding" – Company
- "Home" – Bobby, The Group, and Older Rabbi

Act II

- "We're Goin' Loco!" – Josephine Baker, Comedian Harmonists and Company
- "Hungarian Rhapsody #20" – Comedian Harmonists
- "Come to the Fatherland!" – Harry and Comedian Harmonists
- "Where You Go" – Mary and Ruth
- "In This World" – Chopin, Comedian Harmonists, and The Film Cast
- "Threnody" – Older Rabbi
- "Stars in the Night" – Company

== Awards and nominations ==
=== Off-Broadway production ===
Year	Award Ceremony	Category	Nominee	Result
2022	Lucille Lortel Awards	Outstanding Musical		Nominated
2022	Lucille Lortel Awards	Outstanding Choreography	Warren Carlyle	Nominated
2022	Off-Broadway League Awards	Outstanding Off-Broadway Musical		Won
2022	Drama Desk Awards	Outstanding Musical		Nominated
2022	Drama Desk Awards	Outstanding Book of a Musical	Bruce Sussman	Won
2022	Drama Desk Awards	Outstanding Actor in a Musical	Chip Zien	Nominated
2022	Outer Critics Circle Awards	Outstanding New Off-Broadway Musical		Nominated
2022	Outer Critics Circle Awards	Outstanding Book of a Musical (Broadway or Off-Broadway)	Bruce Sussman	Nominated
2022	Outer Critics Circle Awards	Outstanding New Score (Broadway or Off-Broadway)	Bruce Sussman and Barry Manilow	Nominated
2022	Outer Critics Circle Awards	Outstanding Director of a Musical	Warren Carlyle	Nominated
2022	Outer Critics Circle Awards	Outstanding Choreography	Warren Carlyle	Nominated
2022	Outer Critics Circle Awards	Outstanding Orchestrations	Doug Walter	Nominated
2022	Outer Critics Circle Awards	Outstanding Actor in a Musical	Chip Zien	Nominated
2022	Outer Critics Circle Awards	Outstanding Sound Design (Play or Musical)	Dan Moses Schreier	Nominated

=== Broadway production ===
Year	Award Ceremony	Category	Nominee	Result
2024	Drama League Awards	Outstanding Production of a Musical		Nominated
