= Agrarian conservatism in Germany =

Agrarian conservatism in Germany was a type of conservatism that began to wane in popularity prior to the rise of the Nazi Party.

Following the Aufklärung, (Note: The term "Aufklärung" is preferable, as discussions of the Enlightenment in this article are situated in Germany.) German Conservatives rejected the newly-emergent habit of constantly questioning the status quo and never finding satisfaction in the present moment. Instead, these conservatives ardently insisted that this new, "enlightened" mode of thought was dominated by perverse skepticism, immorality, and the undermining of authority. By the late nineteenth century, the conservative ideology had fragmented as thinkers began to postulate their own understandings of the world. Some conservatives adopted Romantic views of the world and began to compose their dictums with strong, underlying senses of nostalgia. Nowhere was this sentiment stronger than in the words of German Agrarian Conservatives, who expressed both their bitterness for the present condition of the German state and their yearning for a return to a more organic, pastoral sense of life.

With romanticism as its steadying hand, agrarian conservatism evolved from the earlier "Reactionary" line of conservatives. Their views are not conservative in the strict sense, as they seek to actively return the status quo to one of its prior states, rather than simply preserve certain traditional aspects of society. Agrarian elites united under this mantra of changing the status quo and formed the Bund der Landwirte (BdL), seeking to organize and represent what they felt was Germany's heritage and most important economic sector – farming.

Influential figures in German agrarian conservatism ranged from revolutionary conservatives such as Oswald Spengler to even Junkers like Ewald von Kleist-Schmenzin. In this sense, its connections to farming as an ideology did not necessitate farmers as its constituency. Rather, romantic thinkers and ordinary landowners alike united, lusting for the destruction of the German Republic and wistfully hoping for the establishment of a pre-Enlightenment agrarian society. Hitler and the Third Reich outlawed all non-Nazi political entities, but ideologues like Friedrich Reck took up the mantle of agrarian conservatism. His Diary of a Man in Despair catalogues the worldview of a "lost" (Note: The term "lost" is used here in the sense that the Nazi Party effectively destroyed the Conservative Party and, thus, the Agrarian Conservative ideology.) generation of thinkers living under the Nazi ideology. Others, like the aforementioned von Kleit-Schmenzin, radicalized even more, going so far as to join the 20 July plot to kill Adolf Hitler.

== Roots of Conservative Thought ==
Arthur Moeller van den Bruck states in his controversial Germanys Third Empire, "The Left has reason. The Right has understanding." This over-simplification of conservatism underscores the key tenets of thinkers on the Right: understanding. Rather than view the world with an enlightened sense of wonder, conservatives perceived such curiosity as fleeting. They prefer order and hegemony to the uncertainty and skepticism of Enlightenment liberalism. Such thought is best explained by the conservative reaction to the French Revolution of 1789. German conservatives observed the degradation of Liberté, Égalitié, Fraternité into the tyrannical rule of the majority, and the perceived "chaos" of liberalism and Enlightenment morality led them to argue that rationalism led to the erosion of civilization. Unlike their liberal counterparts, conservatives resorted to the status quo ante as justification for their beliefs. In unquestioning idolization of the existing state of affairs, conservatives stress the preservation of order over all else. They fear the unknown – violent upheaval, tyranny, and death are often correlated with Enlightenment calls for liberty; the French Revolution of 1789 only further justified this claim.

Conservatives find their roots, as a generality, having emerged from Anti-Enlightenment thinkers such as Rousseau and Burke. In recalling Rousseau's "stand against rationalism on the basis of the 'reason of feeling'," conservatives rejected the Enlightenments attempts to explain with the explicit intention of perceiving. They suggested that reason and perception ought to exist as one. Simply put, what one sees is what one ought to believe. Again, this sentiment of the "tangible world" recalls the aforementioned rejection of Enlightenment thought. Romanticizing the past, conservatives recall Burke's suggestions of organic society and intergenerational responsibility. This nostalgia allows the conservative to justify the past status quo as superior – as harbingers of Burke's organicism and intergenerationalism, these thinkers dutifully reject the destabilizing, anti-historicist views of the Enlightenment liberal. Subsequently, the curbing of individual desire and the absence of conflicting interests formed key tenets in its anti-Enlightenment rationale. However, the degree to which these tenets are upheld designates splits among the ideology itself. Three types of conservatives have been identified: the defenders of the status quo, reform conservatives, and reactionary conservatives. The prior two will be simply defined and explained, while reactionary conservatives will be highly discussed, given the close linkage of reactionary conservatism and agrarian conservatism.

=== Defenders of the Status Quo ===
Defenders of the status quo are precisely such – they are conservative members of society who perceive the present status quo as amicable to their place in society. Generally upper-class, these thinkers are situated in a scenario of little hope. Their ahistorical view of the world distances themselves from the reactionaries and reformers who seek some variation of the past. Rather, these thinkers are trapped in an ever-changing society, whereby they witness the natural progression of society. Their ideal society – the present status quo – is seemingly displaying the throes of death, progressing aimlessly and with rapidity towards "civilizations end." Their fascination with the present predicates a hatred of the future; the future is the coming death-knell to their way of life. As such, progressive sentiment of disenfranchisement oft leads this type of Conservative to convert to a Reactionary.

=== Reform Conservatism ===
The reform conservative prefers gradual change – a conversion of modernism predicated on the conservation of continuity. Reform conservatism accepts the inevitable progressivism of society, seeking only to preserve and project visions of order and hegemony as espoused by all conservatives. Hence, reformers lay claim to what Burke calls, "a tendency to preserve with an inclination to improve." They exist as perennial moderates, seeking to adapt their visions of the past status quo to modern needs, so as to espouse their aforementioned edicts – hegemony and order. (Note: Auerbach stresses the psychology of the Conservative mind – preference for the known, fear of the uncertain.) Perhaps the clearest exemplars of reform conservatism in Germany are the "Bismarckians." Upon taking power as a conservative, Bismarck sought to uphold the sanctity of the past status quo. The monarchy was to reign supreme, but the past conception of a monarchical ruler as "arbiter above all classes" was unfavorable to Bismarck. Such a system proved historically inept at handling the working poor, leaving them to fend for themselves. As much of the general populace struggled, so did the legitimacy of the monarch in their eyes. Rather, a welfarist system was established in the German Empire to meet the needs of the populace, whilst to maintain the favorability of the monarchy in the eyes of the populace, as well as its absolute power.

=== Reactionary Conservatism ===
Most German to agrarian conservatism is the reactionary conservative ideology. Reactionary conservatives are – in a strict sense – not conservatives at all; they seek not to modify or preserve the current status quo, but to replace it with an earlier time that history has abandoned.

Reactionaries actively intervene in their society to re-establish a prior status quo. Oswald Spengler, Friedrich Reck-Malleczewen, and Ewald von Kleit-Schmenzin are exemplars of this idealism. All three men actively sought the destruction of Hitler's Third Reich, which they saw as a heretical status quo. For Spengler, the revolution was theory. His Decline of the West details a skeptical history of the downfall of man. Reck-Malleczewen met Hitler on various occasions, and his Diary of a Man in Despair constantly recalls the grief Reck felt over having not killed Hitler when he had the opportunity. Von Kleit-Schmenzin was perhaps the most active of these three, involving himself in the 20 July plot, and following through with the plan to assassinate the Führer and restore order to a Third Reich. All three of these men preached the core conservative tenets, – order and harmony through hegemony and tradition – and each attempted to subvert their status quo and replace it with the idealized agrarian one, albeit through differing methods. Ironically, revolutionary conservatives stray far from the traditional roots of conservatism, as they, above all others, advocate discord and violence to create a new status quo.

==== The Agrarian Conservative ====
Agrarianism is thus a revolutionary conservative dictum. Three of its most notable proponents – Spengler, Reck, and von Kleit-Schmenzin – were all agrarian thinkers. Their vision for the new status quo is best described as a return to a pastoralist society, whereby men lead simple lives as utopian farmers, sustaining themselves and their culture through simple, "Earthly" lives. Unlike their Reactionary and Reformist brethren, agrarian revolutionaries seek not only the violent upheaval of the status quo to return to this pastoralism, but they reject nearly all sense of modernism. They seek to dispose of the modern, with the intent of recreating – and living solely in – the past. Reck himself exemplifies this mindset in Diary of a Man in Despair. Throughout the novel, Reck explains his great distaste for "Bismarckian modernization" of the state, as well as "Nazist industrialization" of the state. Reck's constant referral to "superfluous bureaucrats" and the inefficiencies of the state reflect this pastoral vision, after all, a pastoral society lacks a state. Just as Marx describes utopian Communism, Reck and Spengler picture a utopian Agrarianism, whereby the main emphasis of society is not, as Marx would have, the means of production, but the men of the land. All culture, high society, and civilization branch from these thinkers' idealized pastoral state – the ancien regime perhaps best represents this idea. A strong monarchy with a limited bureaucracy would represent the government and manage the state, whilst the people would exist in romanticized farming villages – their culture, livelihood, and civilization emerge from their profession and organic connection with the land itself.

== Agrarianism Under Bismarck and Before the Weimar Republic ==
Under the rule of Otto von Bismarck – both as Chancellor of Germany and Foreign Minister of Prussia – German conservatives were not necessarily at the apex of their power. They therefore gradually assumed governmental control of Prussia, the then dominant German state and, by 1863, they had collectively transformed the newspaper into a political tool. By 1864, Bismarck had effectively installed a wholly conservative government – Realpolitik, monarchical solidarity, and the support for a modernized yet traditional status quo weakened the liberal parties and strengthened a Bismarckian foothold on Prussia. Such a grasp on the political climate of Prussia translated proportionately to the political climate of a unified Germany, especially when it is considered that Bismarck was installed as the German Chancellor. The conservatives became the de facto and de jure representatives of the Junker class in government.

=== Agrarians as anti-Bismarck ===
Agrarian conservatives under Bismarck took issue with the Prussian – and later, German – status quo. In the 1830s, Prussia was an industrious state, seeking to emulate the developmental patterns of England and avoid the vast problems they perceived within British society. Their problem was, in their words, "modern feudalism," – the Berliner Politisches Wochenblatt, a weekly publication, denounced the supposed resurrection of the old aristocracy under false pretenses. Agrarianists proposed that the only acceptable status quo was the ancien regime, where gold still retained its power over iron. Industrialized Prussia and, later, a modernized Germany were key issues of these dissenters. Yet, there were members of the conservatives, such as Viktor Aimé Huber, who saw such luddism as an oddity. Huber was a member of the Junkers out of birth, but not due to ancient heritage. His parents were massive literary successes, leading him to be born of the nouveau riche.

The Bund der Landwirte emerged in 1893, but had pundits espousing its views since the 1870s, when the commercial crisis had occurred. An 1879 grain tariff – imbued in protectionism and emanating from agrarian conservative politics, especially protectionism – marks a tangible production via the organization of agrarianists. The Great Crash of 1873, a massive economic downturn, led to a large shift in votes toward the conservatives. Conservatives gained 37 seats in the Reichstag by 1879, and in the 1884 election, while Germany was still dealing with economic instability, conservatives won another 19 seats in the Reichstag. Agrarian workers – farmers and landowning Junkers – who felt disenfranchised by this decline turned to the doctrine of agrarian conservatism. Recalling the prosperous past, they sought to turn Germany inward. As pastoral societies are by definition relatively self-centered, the agrarian conservatives rallied around protectionism and a sense of "biologically oriented völkisch nationalism." Notably, the BdL's influence on German politics continued throughout the Second World War. However, the organization ceased to exist as a formality, having been reorganized as the Reichsnährstand by the Nazis in 1933.

== Agrarian Conservatism Under the Third Reich ==
Early associations between Nazism and conservatism were amicable – agricultural and military opposition to the German Revolution of 1918-1919 suggest sympathy for National Socialism. Furthermore, the assistance of Franz von Papen and Alfred Hugenberg irrefutably connects the legacies of conservatism and National Socialism. However, the alienating "New Order" of Hitler's Third Reich suggests that relations between conservatives and National Socialists were not perfect. Though similarly "traditionalist" in their yearn to recapture a past German status quo, the Nazi Party and conservatives sought different futures. The Nazi future, led by high technology and scientific development, conflicted directly with the conservative future, led by some rendition of the ancien regime, and varying degrees of tradition (depending on the type of conservative concerned). The imperative obtainment of rural votes established Nazi predominance in German politics, yet reasons for the abandoning of traditional conservatism in favor of National Socialism are, at best, speculations. Regardless, Nazi efforts to modernize agriculture resulted in the increase of farmers' income, as well as crop production. Holmes identifies a key difference in the Nazi and conservative ideologies that rendered them inevitably incompatible:

Unlike the Junker who strove to remake the world over only once, to restore some mythological vision of the past with modern methods of political persuasion, Hitler wanted to remake the world over and over again, that is, to make revolution.

Indeed, Hitler betrayed conservatism, fermenting a policy of Gleichschaltung – the Nazification of Germany, without exception. This understanding prohibited the existence of non-Nazi political parties, as proclaimed formally in the Law Against the Founding of New Parties, legalized 14 July 1933, monopolized the rule of the Nazi regime.

=== Agrarians after the Prohibition ===
Friederich Reck-Malleczewen's classification of himself as a "Man in Despair," describes the general sentiment of agrarian conservatives following the institution of Gleichschaltung. No longer were the Junkers, agrarian leaders, or farmworkers themselves the domineering class of a ruling political party. Shunned to the sidelines, these men persisted in spite of their views. Reck-Malleczewen's characterizations of grief and general disgust at the "New Germany" proclaimed by the Nazis represents the sentiment of but one man of many. However, his view is not unique – Oswald Spengler noted that he and his brethren were the "last men" in a declining Western civilization. This notion of being the last vanguard between the destruction of the West and the rise of uncivilized, uncultured man permeates not only Reck's compositions and Spengler's writings, but also the life of Junker Ewald von Kleist-Schmenzin. Von Kleist-Schmenzin, as a member of the aristocracy, took issue with the rule of Hitler. Detesting the industrious, modern Germany which had abandoned rural influence and culture, von Kleist-Schmenzin participated in the 20 July Plot. This plan was a failed putsch, whereby Hitler was to be assassinated and replaced. Revolutionary by design, this plan confirms the association of agrarian conservatism with revolutionary conservatism.

Undoubtedly, these "Men in Despair" lived in anguish. Reck-Malleczewen's account of life under Nazism confirms this, as do the actions of von Kleist-Schmenzin and the other agrarian conservatives of the 20 July Plot. Nazism existed as a form of totalitarianism, whereby the citizenry is fashioned by the doctrine of absolutist rulers. In this specific instance, Hitler and the Nazi Party created the dictums of the state. (Note: Bruck's composition predates the Nazi Party rule, but nonetheless emanates what would then become the core tenets and understandings of the Nazis' weltanschauung.) As strict believers in the old status quo, and as revolutionaries who seek to re-establish a society from the past, the new, unproven, and alien Nazi Third Reich contradicted with their pastoralist views. Its rejection of an agricultural, "Earthly" society in favor of an industrious, modernized Germany defied their very visions. Nazi Germany was devoid of their organic and intergenerational life – it professed its love for a radically modern, mechanically "cold" Germany.

Detested by the society they inhabited and rejected by their moderate peers, German agrarian conservatives were alienated by their own country. Germany chose the path of National Socialism with Hitler's rise to Chancellor in 1933, preventing an organic society from ever emerging. Hitler's illegalization of conservatism as a whole further estranged these thinkers. The roots of the German agrarian conservative ideology – dissatisfaction with the status quo of an industrializing 1830s Prussia – established their sentiment of disenfranchisement. When the Nazis eliminated conservatism as a whole, this notion of marginalization only grew stronger and deeper. By the end of World War II and the fall of the Third Reich, agrarian conservatism would fade just as it began – a clinging reminder of a long-forgotten past.

== See also ==
- Conservatism in Germany
- East Elbia
- Agricultural League
- Christian-National Peasants' and Farmers' Party
- Rural People's Movement
