= Monte Carlo Madness =

1932 film

- German film poster
- Directed by: Hanns Schwarz
- Written by: Fritz Reck-Malleczewen (novel); Rowland V. Lee; Hans Müller; Franz Schulz
- Produced by: Erich Pommer
- Starring: Sari Maritza; Hans Albers; Helen Haye
- Cinematography: Konstantin Irmen-Tschet; Günther Rittau
- Edited by: Willy Zeyn
- Music by: Werner R. Heymann
- Production company: UFA
- Distributed by: British International Pictures
- Release dates: 23 March 1932 (London); 3 June 1932 (New York)
- Running time: 83 minutes
- Country: Germany
- Language: English

Monte Carlo Madness is a 1932 German musical comedy film directed by Hanns Schwarz and starring Sari Maritza, Hans Albers and Charles Redgie. It was an English-language version of the 1931 German film Bombs on Monte Carlo, which was based on the 1930 novel Bombs on Monte Carlo by Fritz Reck-Malleczewen. The screenplay concerns a captain who falls in love with a Queen in Monte Carlo. It cost 375,000 ℛ︁ℳ︁ to produce.

The film's sets were designed by the art director Erich Kettelhut.

== Plot ==
In Monte Carlo, a captain tries his luck at the gaming table to raise money to pay his crew. He meets and falls in love with a queen.

== Cast ==
- Sari Maritza as Queen Yola
- Hans Albers as Capt. Erickson
- Charles Redgie as Peter
- Helen Haye as Isabel
- John Deverell as Consul
- C. Hooper Trask as Prime Minister
- Comedian Harmonists as Themselves
- Kapelle Carlo Minari as Themselves - Orchestra

== Reception ==
The film was not a success with contemporary critics. A review in Film Pictorial observed that "Erich Pommer is a great producer, but in this film he does not live up to his established reputation.
