= Nicolai Shutorev =

American singer

Nicolai Grigorievich Shutorev (December 30, 1914 – September 20, 1948), also known as Nicholas Shuteroff, was an American singer of Russian descent.

== Life ==
Nicolai Shutorev was born in San Francisco, the youngest child of Grigori Hritonivich Shutorev and his wife Alexandra Grigorievna Vasilieva. His parents had emigrated from Russia to the United States with his older siblings around 1912.

In 1934 Nicolai graduated from Mission High School in San Francisco. He then worked as an office clerk. It is uncertain what, if any, musical training he received, but as a 23-year-old he performed as a conductor of a balalaika orchestra and an a cappella choir at a charity event. Before World War II, he was a member of the San Francisco Opera Company and took small film roles.

In 1940 he married Luby Bubeshko, and on 28 December 1942 he was drafted into the American military.

From early 1943 he was stationed in Pennsylvania, at Fort Indiantown Gap, known as "The Gap", near Harrisburg. While at Indiantown, he participated as a singer in numerous USO events. He also composed songs himself and created accompanying arrangements for Russian folk songs. He participated in charity concerts, a folk competition, dances and radio broadcasts at Indiantown. Towards the end of the war, Shutorev was transferred to Missouri, where he also performed as a singer at entertainment evenings and church concerts. His repertoire at recitals included humorous numbers, folk songs, Russian and Italian songs, classics by Handel as well as the occasional patriotic American number.

After the end of the war, he performed as a concert singer and in church concerts. Also he was a member of the Los Angeles Opera Company, with whom he performed in The Barber of Seville on 1 September 1947. He also performed with a vocal ensemble called The Serenaders, consisting of Shutorev as a Baritone, a Mezzo-soprano who also accompanied the group on the piano, a Soprano and a Bass. Furthermore, he at least occasionally worked as a voice actor. Only since the release of the short film on the Looney Tunes Golden Collection DVD in October of 2003 did it become known that Shutorev lent his voice to opera singer "Giovanni Jones" in the classic Bugs Bunny short Long-Haired Hare, which was released less than a year after Shutorev's death.

Since late in 1947, he belonged to the newly formed American version of the Comedian Harmonists, which had been founded by the former second Tenor of the original group, Erich Collin, who now also lived in Los Angeles, and which, among others, also included the trumpeter, pianist and arranger Jack Cathcart. The group began a European tour in the summer of 1948 with a concert in Stockholm on 2 August 1948.

Shutorev died of gastric rupture on 20 September 1948 in Bergen, Norway.

== Family ==
Shutorev's marriage to Luby Bubeshko (16 August 1916 – 11 February 2011) remained childless.
