= My Gal is a High-Born Lady =

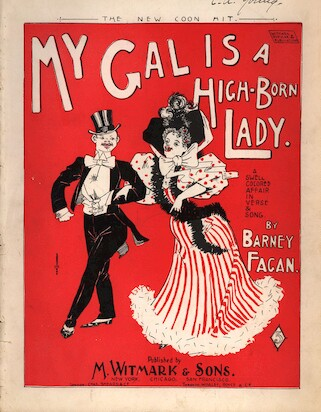
Original Sheet Music Cover

"My Gal is a High-Born Lady" (alternative titles: My Gal is a High Born Lady, My Gal's a High Born Lady) is a minstrel song written by Barney Fagan and Gustav Luders (music) in 1896. It was a favourite well into the first half of the 20th century and is still performed today, often in bluegrass style. Its unusual ragtime rhythm is regarded as seminal in the later popularity of the Foxtrot. The original lyrics are offensive to modern culture due to their racial stereotypes and the song is notable for how often it has been performed with altered lyrics (e.g. the Looney Tunes cartoon Long-Haired Hare).
