= Bombs on Monte Carlo (1960 film) =

1960 film

- German film poster
- German: Bomben auf Monte Carlo
- Directed by: Georg Jacoby
- Written by: Will Berthold; Werner Jacobs; Frederick Stephani; Hans Wilhelm
- Based on: Bombs on Monte Carlo by Fritz Reck-Malleczewen
- Produced by: Gero Wecker
- Starring: Eddie Constantine; Marion Michael; Gunther Philipp
- Cinematography: Roger Hubert; Ernst W. Kalinke; Michel Kelber; Sepp Ketterer; Werner Krien; Gerhard Krüger
- Edited by: Liselotte Schumacher
- Music by: Werner R. Heymann; Willy Mattes
- Production company: Arca-Filmproduktion
- Distributed by: Neue Filmverleih
- Release date: 11 March 1960
- Running time: 86 minutes
- Country: West Germany
- Language: German

Bombs on Monte Carlo (German: Bomben auf Monte Carlo) is a 1960 German comedy film directed by Georg Jacoby and starring Eddie Constantine, Marion Michael and Gunther Philipp. The film was based on a novel by Fritz Reck-Malleczewen which had already been adapted as a film in 1931 as Bombs on Monte Carlo.

Location shooting took place in Monaco, Nice and at the Schleissheim Palace in Munich. The film's sets were designed by the art directors Ernst H. Albrecht and Niko Matul.

== Cast ==
- Eddie Constantine as Captain Eddie Cronen
- Marion Michael as Princess Marina
- Gunther Philipp as Dr. Swaart
- Gunnar Möller as Burg
- Barbara Laage as Olga
- Dominique Wilms as Giuletta
- Denise Grey as Contesse Tamm
- Albert Préjean as ward
- Viktor de Kowa as minister
