= Bombs on Monte Carlo (1931 film) =

1931 film

- German film poster
- German: Bomben auf Monte Carlo
- Directed by: Hanns Schwarz
- Written by: Jenö Heltai; Hans Müller; Franz Schulz
- Based on: Bombs on Monte Carlo by Fritz Reck-Malleczewen
- Produced by: Erich Pommer
- Starring: Hans Albers; Anna Sten; Heinz Rühmann
- Cinematography: Konstantin Irmen-Tschet; Günther Rittau
- Edited by: Willy Zeyn
- Music by: Werner R. Heymann
- Production company: UFA
- Distributed by: UFA
- Release date: 31 August 1931
- Running time: 111 minutes
- Country: Germany
- Language: German

Bombs on Monte Carlo (German: Bomben auf Monte Carlo) is a 1931 German musical comedy film directed by Hanns Schwarz and starring Hans Albers, Anna Sten, and Heinz Rühmann. The film is based on the novel Bomben auf Monte Carlo (1930) by Fritz Reck-Malleczewen. It premiered at the Ufa-Palast am Zoo in August 1931.

The film is known for featuring the German a capella band Comedian Harmonists, who perform the song Das ist die Liebe der Matrosen.

== Plot ==
Captain Craddock commands the Mediterranean cruiser Persimon, which sails under the flag of the Kingdom of Pontenero. Like his crew, he hasn't received any pay for a long time because the kingdom is bankrupt. Therefore, he refuses to take Queen Yola I on board for a Mediterranean cruise.

Instead, he goes to Monte Carlo to confront the Pontenero consul there. But Yola is already there incognito and, for lack of money, sacrifices her pearl necklace, for which Craddock finally receives 100,000 francs.

Disguised as a demi-monde lady, Yola persuades the captain to try his luck at the casino, where Craddock loses all the money after initial winnings. He blames the manager and threatens to shell the casino with his ship's cannons if he doesn't get the money back.

Undetected, Yola follows the angry captain onto his cruiser, where the artillery is actually readied by the next day. Panic breaks out in the city and people flee. Then Yola reveals herself as the queen on deck and forbids the shelling. She wants Craddock to be her Secretary of the Navy, and since he is recalcitrant, she has him summarily arrested by the first officer. But Craddock jumps overboard to catch a passing passenger ship. Yola does not give up and orders the cruiser to follow the ship. The outcome remains open, the film ends with sea shanties.

== Production ==
The film was produced by the production unit of Erich Pommer. It was made at the Babelsberg Studios in Berlin and shot on location in Nice. The art director Erich Kettelhut designed the film sets. A separate English-language version Monte Carlo Madness and a French version Le capitaine Craddock were also made as part of UFA's strategy to export its films to other countries. In 1960 the film was remade as Bombs on Monte Carlo.

== Cast ==
- Hans Albers as Craddock
- Anna Sten as Yola
- Heinz Rühmann as Peter Schmidt
- Ida Wüst as Isabell
- Rachel Devirys as Diane
- Kurt Gerron as casino manager
- Karl Etlinger as consul
- Peter Lorre as Pawlitschek
- Otto Wallburg as minister
- Charles Kullmann as street singer
- Bruno Ziener as jeweler
- Comedian Harmonists as sailors
