= Bomben auf Monte Carlo (novel) =

1930 novel by Fritz Reck-Malleczewen

- Author: Fritz Reck-Malleczewen
- Language: German
- Genre: Comedy
- Publication date: 1930
- Publication place: Germany
- Media type: Print

Bomben auf Monte Carlo is a 1930 German comedy novel by Fritz Reck-Malleczewen.

== Description ==
In the novel, the penniless captain of a vessel puts into Monte Carlo, hoping to raise money at the gaming tables to pay his crew. While there he becomes entangled with a monarch in disguise.

== Film adaptations ==
The story has been made into four films at the time of writing. In 1931, the German film Bombs on Monte Carlo was made, with a French-language version Captain Craddock and an English-language version Monte Carlo Madness made at the same time.

In 1960 a fourth film version was made entitled Bombs on Monte Carlo and directed by Georg Jacoby.
