= Das ist die Liebe der Matrosen =

Das ist die Liebe der Matrosen (That's the Love of the Sailors) is a 1931 song by Comedian Harmonists, written by Robert Gilbert and composed by Werner Richard Heymann. It was performed by the band in the 1931 musical comedy Bomben auf Monte Carlo. The Comedian Harmonists recorded and published the English version The Way With Every Sailor in 1931, too.

== In popular culture ==
The song inspired the title of a 1962 Austrian film Das ist die Liebe der Matrosen.
