= Long-Haired Hare =

1949 American animated Looney Tunes comedy

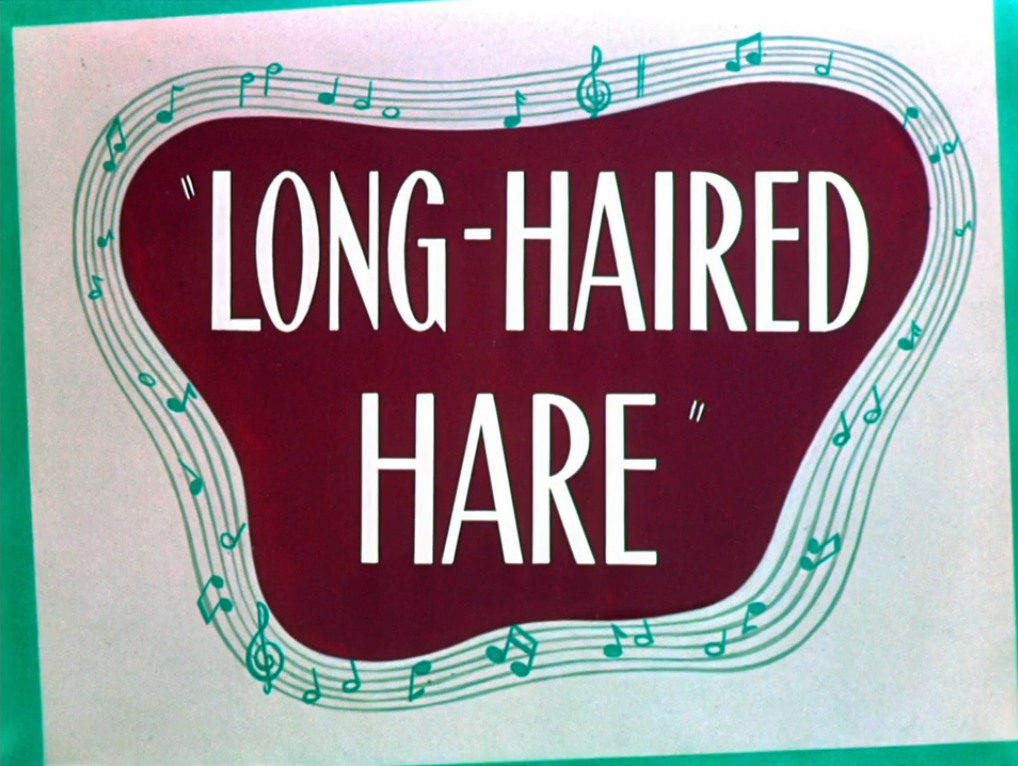
- Title card
- Directed by: Charles M. Jones
- Story by: Michael Maltese
- Starring: Mel Blanc; Nicolai Shutorev
- Music by: Carl Stalling
- Animation by: Phil Monroe; Ben Washam; Lloyd Vaughan; Ken Harris; Richard Thompson
- Layouts by: Robert Gribbroek
- Backgrounds by: Peter Alvarado
- Color process: Technicolor
- Production company: Warner Bros. Cartoons
- Distributed by: Warner Bros. Pictures; The Vitaphone Corporation
- Release date: June 25, 1949
- Running time: 7:36
- Language: English

Long-Haired Hare is a 1949 American animated short film directed by Chuck Jones and written by Michael Maltese. It was produced by Warner Bros. Cartoons and distributed by Warner Bros. Pictures as part of the Looney Tunes series, and was the 60th short to feature Bugs Bunny. In addition to including the homophones "hair" and "hare", the title is also a pun on "longhairs", a characterization of classical music lovers. Nicolai Shutorev provides the singing voice of Giovanni Jones. An edited version of this short forms part of The Bugs Bunny/Road Runner Movie (1979).

== Plot ==
On a hillside, Bugs is singing "A Rainy Night in Rio" as he plays a banjo. His singing distracts opera singer Giovanni Jones, who is trying to rehearse "Largo al Factotum" in a nearby Frank Lloyd Wright-style house. Jones absent-mindedly starts singing along with Bugs, then angrily walks over to his rabbit hole and destroys the banjo. On two later occasions Bugs again distracts Jones and sends him into a rage—first when he sings "My Gal is a High-Born Lady" with a harp, which results in Jones trapping Bugs's neck by closing both sides of the harp like a vise, and then by performing "When Yuba Plays the Rhumba on the Tuba" on a sousaphone, after which Jones bumps Bugs's head repeatedly against a tree branch after tying his ears around it, hoping this will finally get Bugs to stop ruining his rehearsal. Unfortunately though for him, having had just about enough of Jones himself, Bugs angrily vows revenge, saying to the viewers, "Of course you know, this means war!".

On the night of Jones's concert, Bugs puts his plan into action by disrupting Jones' performance with a series of pranks: vibrating the concert stage, spraying alum in his throat to make his head shrink, and posing as a bobby soxer to hand him a stick of dynamite disguised as an autograph pen. As Jones begins his final set, Bugs commandeers the orchestra disguised as Leopold Stokowski. He administers a series of vocal tests, which Jones passes. After brief applause from the audience, Bugs scowls at Jones, then directs him to sing a prolonged high G note. Jones complies, singing until he writhes in pain and his face turns several different colors, eventually causing the stage shell to collapse in on him. Satisfied, Bugs stops conducting long enough for Jones to stagger to his feet and take a bow. As Bugs looks up, he notices a large piece of concrete balanced on a beam directly above Jones, and directs him to resume the high note until the concrete falls onto him (offscreen). He then triumphantly strums "Good Evening, Friends" on a new banjo.

== Voice cast ==
- Mel Blanc as Bugs Bunny, Giovanni Jones (speaking), Maestro, Musicians, and Delivery Boy
- Nicolai Shutorev as Giovanni Jones (singing, uncredited)

== Music ==
The film's musical score includes original music by Carl Stalling, but a significant proportion of the score is pre-existing music, including several operatic pieces. The soundtrack includes "Largo al factotum" from Act I of Gioachino Rossini's The Barber of Seville; Arthur Schwartz's "A Rainy Night in Rio"; Barney Fagan's "My Gal is a High-Born Lady"; Herman Hupfeld's song "When Yuba Plays the Rumba on the Tuba" – played by Bugs on a sousaphone; the sextet "Chi mi frena in tal momento" from Act II of Gaetano Donizetti's Lucia di Lammermoor; the 2nd theme from the Prelude to Act III of Richard Wagner's Lohengrin; the overture from Franz von Suppé's operetta Die schöne Galathee (The Beautiful Galatea); and the melody to "It's Magic." This last piece is also used in the cartoon Transylvania 6-5000. "My Gal is a High-Born Lady" is given alternate lyrics, as Barney Fagan's original 1896 song had a racially stereotyped subject and lyrics. The author of the re-written lyrics used in the cartoon is most likely Stalling or Michael Maltese. The Donizetti piece, originally a sextet that comprises part of the opera's Act II finale, seems to have been a favorite of Stalling, and is also used in Book Revue and Back Alley Oproar.

Giovanni Jones' singing voice remained uncredited and unknown for many years, but the DVD commentary identifies him as baritone Nicolai G. Shutorev (1914-1948). Long-Haired Hare was the only known film role for Shutorev, who had otherwise worked in Hollywood as a choral singer.

Also noted on the DVD commentary is Bugs Bunny's conducting performance as "Leopold", as a send-up of conductor Leopold Stokowski's energetic style, including his shunning the baton: Bugs makes a point of snapping the baton in half and discarding it. As Bugs enters the concert hall wearing a Stokowski-like hairpiece, the orchestra members begin whispering among themselves, "Leopold! Leopold!" The DVD commentator also notes that Stokowski conducted many performances at the Hollywood Bowl, where the second half of this film is set. Stokowski was, at the time, one of the best known conductors in the world through personal appearances, recordings, and radio, and also took part in several motion pictures including One Hundred Men And A Girl and Carnegie Hall; however, the most famous film in which he participated, Fantasia (1940), was a difficult production for Warner Brothers' rival Walt Disney Productions that did not earn back its cost until 1970.

== Analysis ==
According to Daniel Goldmark, the director of the Center for Popular Music Studies at Case Western Reserve University, the first two minutes of the cartoon establish a struggle between classical music and popular music. Giovanni acts as if he is protecting the world of "good" music from the ignorant masses which Bugs represents. The folk melodies sung by Bugs are also featured as infectious and treated as disease by Giovanni, acting as a representative of the musical establishment. Each time that Giovanni finds himself singing to one of Bugs' songs, his first reaction is shock, followed by fury that he is wasting his voice on less refined music. Goldmark finds similarities with The Band Concert (1935), where Donald Duck insists on playing Turkey in the Straw and infuriates Mickey Mouse.

Bugs is established as an anti-aesthete first by his initial choice of musical instrument, the banjo. Secondly, he performs in a backwoods setting, as opposed to Giovanni's modern house. Thirdly, he sings from memory while Giovanni uses sheet music. He is also implied to be an untrained musician, contrasting with the trained Giovanni. A further contrast is implied through the geographic origin of their songs; Bugs sings American popular songs, while Giovanni's repertoire is Western European in origin.

The orchestral musicians featured in the short have little to no personality. Their identity depends only on their instrument. Chuck Jones would follow this idea with similar personality-less depictions in the Rabbit of Seville (1950) and Baton Bunny (1959). This contrasts with orchestra-driven animated shorts by other creators.

By assuming the position of the conductor, Bugs places himself at the top of the musical hierarchy. He forces Giovanni into an improvised vocalization which spans his entire range and an exercise of all his technical skills. He then forces Giovanni to hold a painful, long high G, which brings the Hollywood Bowl crashing down on the singer. Bugs assumes the stereotypical attributes of famous conductors, displaying majesty, arrogance, and tyrannical behavior. He also follows the dress code of the concert hall by wearing white tie and tails, formal wear which is still associated with performers.

== Home media ==
- Long-Haired Hare is available, uncensored, uncut and digitally remastered, on the Looney Tunes Golden Collection: Volume 1 DVD set, Disc 1. It is available in high definition on the Looney Tunes Platinum Collection: Volume 2 Blu-ray set, Disc 1. It is also available on "Bugs Bunny's Wacky Adventures" VHS, the "Looney Tunes: Musical Masterpieces" VHS, and the "Looney Tunes: Curtain Calls" laserdisc.

== Sources ==
- Goldmark, Daniel (2005), "Corny Concertos and Silly Symphonies: Classical Music and Cartoons", Tunes for 'Toons: Music and the Hollywood Cartoon, University of California Press, ISBN 9780520941205

== See also ==
- Bugs Bunny filmography
- Looney Tunes and Merrie Melodies filmography (1940–1949)
- Magical Maestro, a 1952 MGM cartoon directed by Tex Avery that also features an opera singer being tormented by an enemy posing as a conductor during a recital

Preceded by Bowery Bugs	Bugs Bunny Cartoons; 1949	Succeeded by Knights Must Fall
