= Wochenend und Sonnenschein =

Song
- Language: German
- English title: Weekend and Sunshine
- Published: 1930
- Composer: Milton Ager
- Lyricist: Charles Amberg

"Wochenend und Sonnenschein" ("Weekend and Sunshine") is a song with German lyrics that was copyrighted in 1930 by Charles Amberg (lyrics) and Milton Ager (music). The music is based on the famed American song "Happy Days Are Here Again" that was copyrighted in 1929 by Ager and Jack Yellen (English lyrics). The German lyrics are very different in spirit from the English ones:

Tief im Wald nur ich und du,
der Herrgott drückt ein Auge zu,
denn er schenkt uns ja zum Glücklichsein
Wochenend und Sonnenschein.

which translates roughly as:

Only you and me, deep in the woods
The lord above turns a blind eye,
For he grants us for being happy
Weekend and sunshine.

"Wochenend und Sonnenschein" was first performed by the popular German sextet, the Comedian Harmonists, who recorded the song on 22 August 1930 on 78 rpm gramophone record. The recording is available on CD.
