= Maleczewo =

- Village
- Location within Poland
- Coordinates: 53°46′54″N 22°18′35″E
- Country: Poland
- Voivodeship: Warmian-Masurian
- County: Ełk
- Gmina: Ełk

Maleczewo [malɛˈt͡ʂɛvɔ] is a village in the administrative district of Gmina Ełk, within Ełk County, Warmian-Masurian Voivodeship, in northern Poland.

== Notable residents ==
- Fritz Reck-Malleczewen (1884-1945), author
- Hermann Reck (1847-1931), politician
