= Charles Redgie =

- Occupation: Actor
- Years active: 1930–1939 (film)

Charles Redgie was a French-based film actor who appeared in thirty six productions between 1930 and 1939. He starred in the French-language film Captain Craddock (1931) and its English-language version Monte Carlo Madness (1932). Several of his performances were made in films made by the French subsidiary of the German studio UFA.

== Selected filmography ==
- The Mystery of the Yellow Room (1930)
- My Childish Father (1930)
- Captain Craddock (1931)
- Monte Carlo Madness (1932)
- A Gentleman of the Ring (1932)
- Here's Berlin (1932)
- Happy Ever After (1932)
- Theodore and Company (1933)
- The Last Billionaire (1934)
- George and Georgette (1934)
- Samson (1936)
- Wells in Flames (1937)
- Ignace (1937)
- The Men Without Names (1937)
- Fort Dolorès (1939)

== Bibliography ==
- Goble, Alan. The Complete Index to Literary Sources in Film. Walter de Gruyter, 1999.
