= Barney Fagan =

American musician

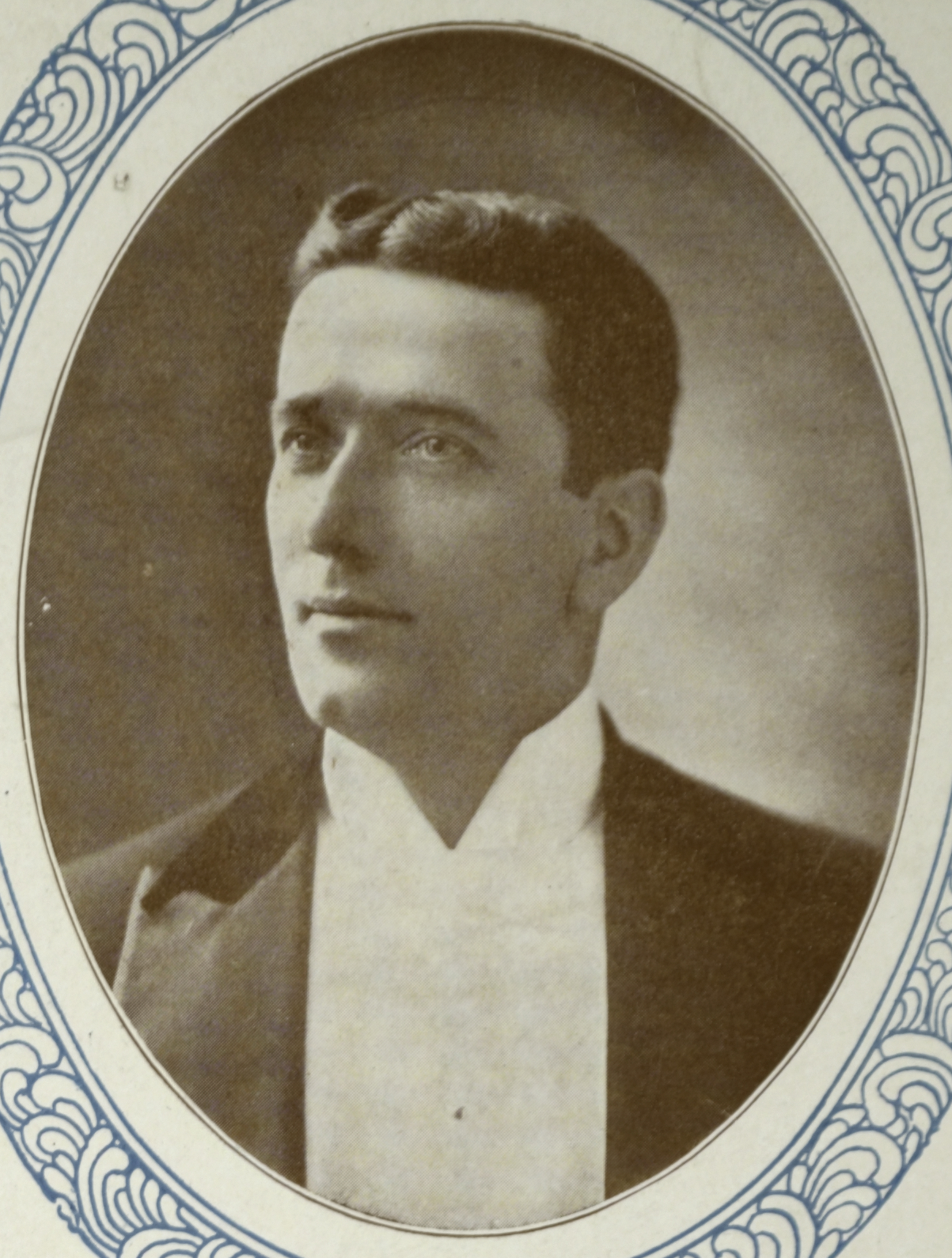
Fagan in 1898

Barney Fagan (January 12, 1850 – January 12, 1937) was an American performer, director, choreographer, and composer.

== Career ==
Barney Fagan was born as Bernard J. Fagan in Boston, son of Douglass and Ellen Fagan. His father was the deputy wharfinger (old term that today is called a harbormaster) at Battery Wharf. He made his first professional appearance in Boston at the Howard Athenaeum in 1860, as the Cabin Boy in The Pilot of Brest. He remained at this theatre several seasons until 1865 when he played his first minstrel engagement with the Morris Brothers in Boston.

In 1870, Fagan went to Saint John, New Brunswick, Canada, and appeared with Pete Lee's Minstrels. In 1873 he joined Buckley's Serenaders in Boston, and took a fellow dancer, Joe Parks, as a partner. During the period 1873-1876, Fagan and Parks, known as the American Lads, played variety engagements. In 1876 he did the famous Heifer dance with Richard Golden in Evangeline. Mr. Fagan next joined John Fenton in a dancing duet, and continued with him until 1878, when he formed a partnership with Lizzie Mulvey, which lasted one season. Fagan's specialty at that time was "clog dancing"—which was a dance performed while wearing wooden-soled shoes, a very popular form of stage entertainment in the late 19th century.

Beginning in 1879, Mr. Fagan allied himself with Barlow, Wilson, Primrose and West's Minstrels, and continued with them until the company's dissolution in June, 1882. During the three years with Barlow and Wilson, he was general producer and performed as a soloist. Possibly Mr. Fagan's greatest achievement was in organizing and producing Willis Sweatnam, Billy Rice and Fagan's Minstrels, which gave their first performance at Albany, New York, July 25, 1887. This troupe was allegedly the largest minstrel company to travel America's entertainment circuit in the 19th century, featuring 105 performers on parade with 88 in the regular company.

In the following years, Fagan performed with various companies, including Thatcher, Primrose and West; Barlow, Wilson and Rankin's; and Cleveland's Minstrels, where Fagan performed opposite to Luke Schoolcraft.

Outside of minstrelsy, Fagan appeared in Blackface in such plays as Paradise Alley, and, in 1890, appeared in High Roller, a production of his own company. At this time, Fagan's work drew praise for notable marches, including "West Point Cadets", the "Phantom Guards" and "The Dance of the Popinjays". During this same period, he was general producer for Corinne for several seasons.

As a songwriter he was no less prominent, penning: "Everybody Takes Their Hat Off to Me" and "My Gal is A High Born Lady". His plays were popular, too: The Land of Fancy and The Game of Love. Starting in 1895, Fagan performed regularly with Herietta Byron, of the Byron Sisters.

In the opinion of Sigmund Spaeth, Fagan's compositions were important in the development of ragtime. In his book A History of Popular Music in America (1948), Spaeth said:

Fagan's lively 'coon song', "My Gal Is a High-Born Lady" (1896), was definitely above the average in both words and music. Fagan was an Irishman, but familiar with minstrel technique and one of the great buck-and-wing dancers of his day. He was famous also as a stage director, creating many elaborate acts for Primrose and West, with a feeling for color and lighting far in advance of his time. There is a story (probably started by Fagan himself) that he wrote his great hit in Chicago one morning, when he found himself down to his last twenty-five cents, and on his wife's birthday at that. He took a bicycle ride along the Lake, broke a pedal and suddenly became conscious of a persistent rhythm as the dangling piece clicked against the wheel. The words ‘My gal is a high born lady’ fitted into the rhythm and suggested a rag-time melody. He stopped long enough to write down the main theme, then hurried home to complete the song, taking it immediately to a publisher and collecting $100.00 in cash, which he promptly spent on a birthday dress and a big party…(More important is the fact that the piano arrangement of 'My Gal Is a High-Born Lady' was made by a youngster named Gustav Luders, of later operatic fame.)" (pgs. 287-288). Dancers sometimes credit him with being the "Father of Tap"(Dancing), although that title has also been applied to others. Frank Dumont in an article in the New York Clipper (March 27, 1915—"The Younger Generation in Minstrelsy and Reminiscences of the Past") remembers Fagan as "the greatest dancer and producer of dancing tableaux and novel groupings…He was a genuine ‘find’ to minstrelsy and his methods are copied to this day in all dancing numbers. He was especially attentive to the young element and made great dancers of them.

He was highly revered by the end of his career. On August 31, 1919, a testimonial dinner was given in his honor in Manhattan, attracting the theatrical luminaries of that era, including Irving Berlin.

Barney Fagan died on his 87th birthday, January 12, 1937, in Bay Shore, Long Island, New York.

== Chronology of theatrical productions/compositions ==
Productions	Genre	Contribution by Barney Fagan	Dates of Productions
Long-Haired Hare	Soundtrack for Bugs Bunny Cartoon	Song: My Gal Is a High-Born Lady	Released June 25, 1949
In Old Sacramento	Soundtrack for Hollywood Film	Song: My Gal Is a High-Born Lady	Released May 31, 1946
Kings Row	Soundtrack for Hollywood Film	Song: My Gal Is a High-Born Lady	Released April 18, 1942
The March of Time	Hollywood Film	Acted as: Played Himself; Old Timer Sequence	1930 - Aborted Film Project; Never Released
Broadway to Hollywood	Hollywood Film	Acted as: Vaudeville act -Archival Footage	Released September 15, 1933
Sidewalks of New York	Original, Musical, Comedy	Acted as: Old Timer	Oct 3, 1927 - Jan 7, 1928
The Jazz Singer	Original, Play, Comedy, Drama	Acted as: Eddie Carter	Sep 14, 1925 - Jun 1926
Ziegfeld Follies of 1911	Original, Musical, Revue	Additional music by Barney Fagan	Jun 26, 1911 - Sep 2, 1911
The Man from China	Original, Musical, Comedy	Directed by Barney Fagan	May 2, 1904 - Jun 4, 1904
By the Sad Sea Waves	Original, Musical, Comedy, Vaudeville	Staged by Barney Fagan; songs by Fagan	Feb 28, 1899 - Apr 8, 1899
The Passing Show	Original, Musical, Extravaganza, Revue	Choreographed by Barney Fagan	May 12, 1894 - Nov 1894
