= East Elbia =

Historical region of Germany

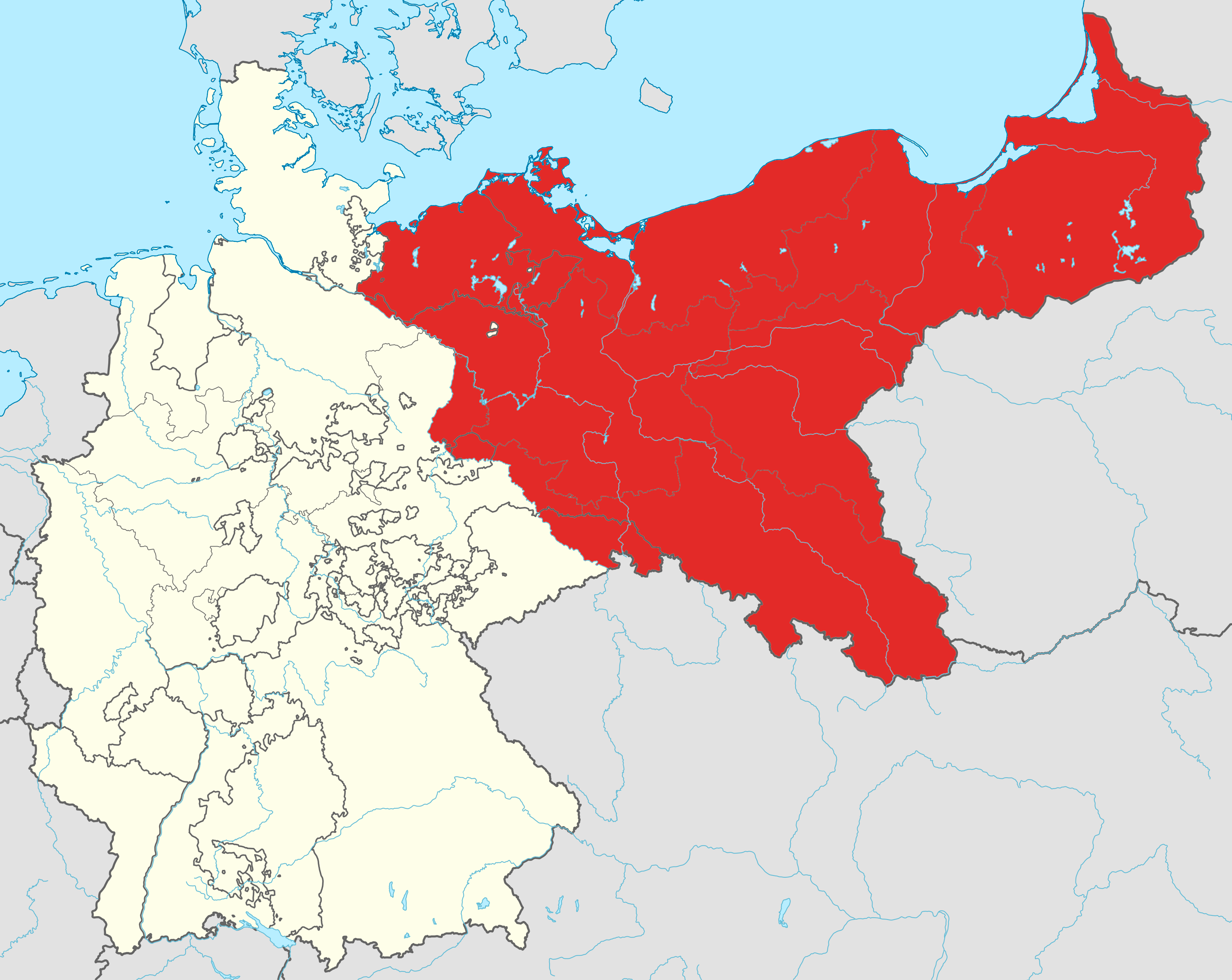
The German Empire with East Elbia colored in.

East Elbia (German: Ostelbien) was an informal denotation for those parts of the German Reich until World War II that lay east of the river Elbe.

The region comprised the Prussian provinces of Brandenburg, the eastern parts of Saxony (Jerichower Land) and the Kingdom of Saxony (Upper Lusatia), Pomerania, Silesia, East Prussia, West Prussia and Posen (from 1922 Posen-West Prussia) as well as the free states of Mecklenburg-Schwerin and Mecklenburg-Strelitz. Berlin and Schleswig-Holstein were not included, even if located East and North, respectively of the Elbe.

East Elbia was noted for its historic manorialism and serfdom, as well as for political conservatism, combined with the predominantly Protestant confession of the local population. During the German Empire (1871–1918), the "East Elbian Junker" formed the monarchy's reactionary backbone. Later, in Weimar Republic (1918–1933), it became a politically charged term used especially by the leftist parties to denote the rich civil servants of the conservative, right-wing German National People's Party (DNVP) who fit the stereotype.

== History ==
The former social structure of this region with relatively large commercial farms owned by landed gentry, Junkers, is a product of the medieval (1100-1300) eastward migration of Germanic settlers into the area of settlement of the Wends and other Slavic groups changing the ethnic makeup of Germania Slavica through assimilation, expulsion and immigration. Since most of former East Elbia is east of the Oder–Neisse line the vast majority of its ethnic German population was subject to expulsion after World War II. In the German Democratic Republic, which controlled the remainder of East Elbia after 1949 a land reform was initiated to collectivize agriculture and also with the explicit goal of eliminating the Junkers. Attempts at restitution for expropriated property after 1990 have only been partially successful and have not led to a reestablishment of the old Junker social structure. The average size of agricultural estates formed from Agricultural Production Cooperatives and Publicly Owned Estates is still much higher in the East than in the West of Germany where agriculture is still based mostly on small farms. The term "East Elbia" has vanished from common use outside historical contexts and is usually glossed in texts aimed at a general audience.

== See also ==
- Junker
- Agrarian conservatism in Germany
