= Roman Cycowski =

American singer (1901–1998)

Roman Cycowski (January 25, 1901 – November 9, 1998) was an American singer who was the last surviving member of the Comedian Harmonists, a German vocal sextet dissolved by the Nazi regime due to the Jewish background of three of its members.

== Biography ==
Born in Łódź, Poland, Cycowski trained as a cantor and relocated to Germany in 1921 with aspirations of becoming an opera singer. In Germany, he was educated at the Berlin Conservatory of Music.

Cycowski joined the Comedian Harmonists in 1927 and was initially seen as a diversion from his operatic goals. As one of the group's three lead singers, Cycowski brought his operatic training to performances, notably in pieces like The Blue Danube and comic adaptations from The Barber of Seville. After the group was disbanded in 1935 under Nazi pressure, Cycowski continued to perform internationally with the other Jewish members as the Comedy Harmonists.

In 1941, Cycowski moved to the United States. He later settled in San Francisco, serving as a cantor at Beth Israel Temple for 15 years before retiring to Palm Springs, California.
