= Captain Craddock =

1931 film

- Directed by: Max de Vaucorbeil; Hanns Schwarz
- Written by: Rowland V. Lee; Hans Müller; Fritz Reck-Malleczewen (novel); Franz Schulz
- Produced by: Erich Pommer
- Starring: Jean Murat; Käthe von Nagy; Charles Redgie
- Cinematography: Konstantin Irmen-Tschet; Günther Rittau
- Music by: Werner R. Heymann
- Production company: UFA
- Distributed by: L'Alliance Cinématographique Européenne
- Release date: 4 December 1931
- Running time: 87 minutes
- Country: Germany
- Language: French

Captain Craddock (French: Le capitaine Craddock) is a 1931 German French-language musical comedy film directed by Max de Vaucorbeil and Hanns Schwarz and starring Jean Murat, Käthe von Nagy and Charles Redgie. It is a French-language version of the 1931 German film Bombs on Monte Carlo. It was shot at the Babelsberg Studios of UFA in Berlin. The film's sets were designed by the art director Erich Kettelhut. It is sometimes known as Bombe Sur Monte Carlo.

== Cast ==
- Jean Murat as Le capitaine Craddock
- Käthe von Nagy as La reine Yola
- Charles Redgie as Pierre
- Alice Tissot as Isabelle
- Sinoël as Le consul
- Rachel Devirys as Diane
- Paul Ollivier as Le directeur du casino
- Lucien Callamand as Brégaillon
- Nicolas Redelsperger as Le ministre des finances
- Comedian Harmonists as Themselves

== Cultural references ==
According to Philippe Goddin, author of Hergé - Chronologie d'une oeuvre, the name of Tintin's character Captain Haddock is inspired by this film. In The Crab with the Golden Claws, Haddock sings one of the film songs, Les gars de la Marine.
