= Erich A. Collin =

German singer (1899–1961)

Erich Adolf Max Abraham Collin (August 26, 1899, in Berlin – April 28, 1961, in Los Angeles) was a German–American singer and the 2nd tenor in the vocal ensemble Comedian Harmonists.

== Life ==
Erich A. Collin's singing talent was discovered at an early age, so he received violin and singing lessons. After graduating high school he was drafted into the German military in 1918, shortly before the end of World War I. After his discharge from the army following basic training, he started Medical school at his father's insistence, but dropped out after the seventh semester. Again due to parental pressure, he began an apprenticeship in a bank, which he also quit after his father's death. Eventually, he took up studies at the Musikhochschule in Berlin in 1924. There he met Erwin Bootz, who brought him to the Comedian Harmonists in 1929, where he replaced Willi Steiner as second Tenor.

In 1931 Collin married the German–French Fernande Holzamer with whom he had one daughter.

In 1935 the three Jewish members of the Comedian Harmonists were banned from performing in Germany, whereupon the group split up and Collin and his two Jewish colleagues emigrated to Vienna with their wives. There they formed a new ensemble, the so-called Emigrant or Viennese Group, which from 1937 onwards mostly used the name Comedy Harmonists. During their extensive tours of Europe, the Soviet Union, Australia, South Africa and South America, Collins' wife and daughter stayed with relatives in France. His sister Annemarie managed to escape Germany to Australia, where the Harmonists hoped to settle, despite concerns about possible detention as Enemy aliens after the beginning of World War II. This plan fell through, however, when the group was unable to return to Australia from a North American tour in 1940 due to the outbreak of the naval war which put a stop to civilian overseas travel.

When the Comedy Harmonists disbanded in 1941, Collin went to Los Angeles and initially worked in the wine shop of a relative of his colleague Roman Cycowski. Through the help of Albert Einstein, who had been a friend of the Collin-Abraham family in Berlin, he obtained a temporary position as a lecturer at a New York university on the subject of old German music. Subsequently, work as a sales representative alternated with periods of unemployment.

In 1947 his wife Fernande and daughter Suzanne, who had survived the war in occupied France, were able to enter the United States.

In the fall of the same year Erich Collin made a successful attempt at creating a new vocal group. Involved in this U.S. version of the Comedian Harmonists were Jack Cathcart (piano), Fred Bixler (first tenor), Murray Pollack (second tenor), Nicolai Shutorev (buffo) and Arthur Atkins (bass). The group toured extensively throughout Scandinavia, the Benelux countries, France, Switzerland, and Italy. Early in the tour, Shutorev died unexpectedly of gastric rupture, after which the group completed their concerts in Norway without him. One concert from Oslo was recorded for Norwegian radio on 26 September 1948, and broadcast several times. From that concert on, Harry Frommermann (now Harry Frohman) completed the ensemble at the request of Erich Collin. In November 1948 the group was again heard in a radio broadcast, this time from Lugano. In February 1949, the group made three records in Basel for the label Le Chant du Monde. Unfortunately, the extremely promising project failed due to differing opinions about the future direction of the group.

In 1949 Collin became a citizen of the United States. In the 1950s, he worked for Northrop and ran a small plastics workshop as a side business. As a victim of Nazi race policies, he began receiving compensation payments from the German government in the late 1950s.

On April 28, 1961, he died of heart failure during an appendectomy at the age of 61. For the documentary film about the Comedian Harmonists by Eberhard Fechner, released in 1976, Collins' sister Annemarie and his wife Fernande were interviewed, providing information about his life and family history. In Joseph Vilsmaier's feature film Comedian Harmonists, Collin was portrayed by German actor Heinrich Schafmeister.

== Family ==
Erich Collin married Fernande Holzamer in 1931. They had one daughter.

His father, Dr. Paul Abraham, was a renowned pediatrician who ran a recreation home for children from the poor quarters of Berlin.

== Literature and film ==
- Eberhard Fechner: Die Comedian Harmonists. Sechs Lebensläufe. Quadriga, Weinheim 1988, ISBN 3-88679-174-2 (Taschenbuchausgabe: Heyne, München 1998, ISBN 3-453-87315-7) (in German)
- Rudolf Vierhaus (Hrsg.): Deutsche Biographische Enzyklopädie Online. 2011–2017, 2011, S. 386 (In German)
- Douglas E. Friedman: The Comedian Harmonists: The Last Great Jewish Performers in Nazi Germany. 2010-10-13
- Die Comedian Harmonists – Sechs Lebensläufe (Part 1 and 2). Documentary film by Eberhard Fechner. 1977.
- Peter Czada: Comedian Harmonists: Ein Vokalensemble erobert die Welt. Edition Hentrich, 1993, ISBN 3894680822

== Audio and video ==
- The Comedian Harmonists: Quand il pleut with lead vocals by Erich Collin (in French) on YouTube
- Film footage of the original group, 1931 (Erich Collin sitting on piano), on YouTube
