= Diary of a Man in Despair =

Diary of Friedrich Reck-Malleczewen during the Nazi regime

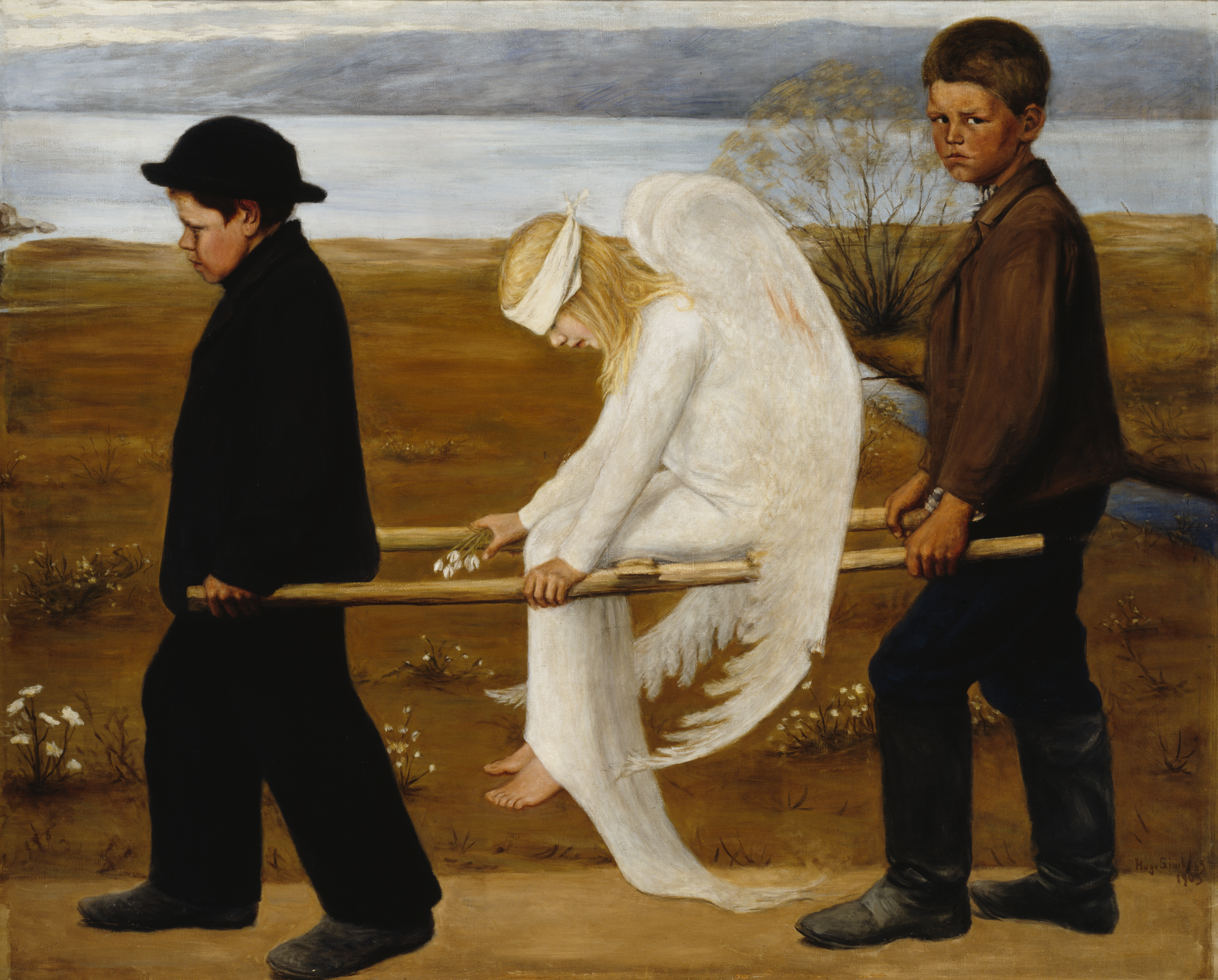
- The Wounded Angel, which was the first English translation's cover
- Author: Friedrich Reck-Malleczewen
- Original title: Tagebuch eines Verzweifelten
- Language: German
- Publication date: 1947
- Publication place: Germany
- English publication date: 1970
- Text: Diary of a Man in Despair at Internet Archive

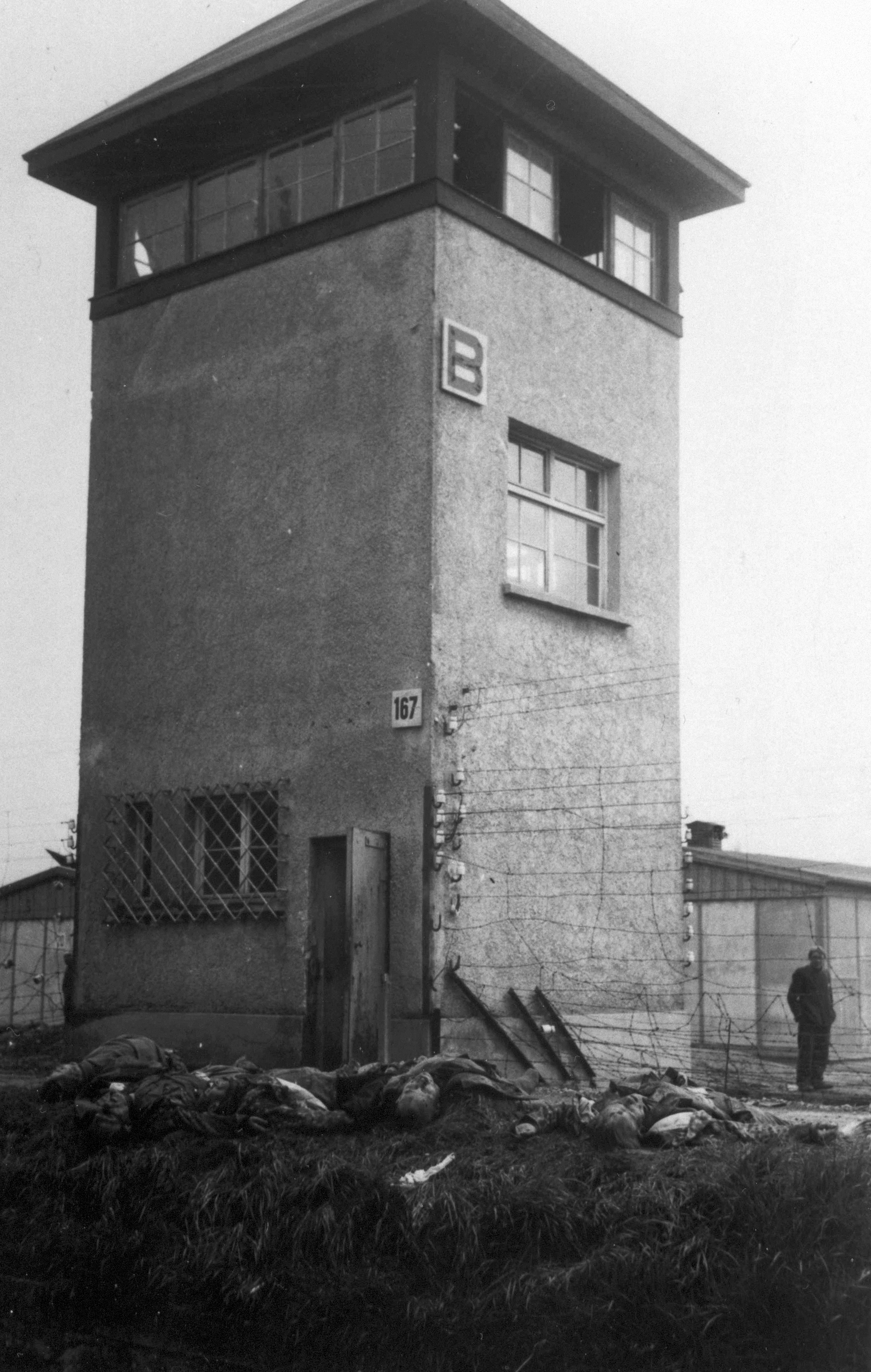
Dachau concentration camp, where Reck-Malleczewen died in 1945 (the bodies in the foreground are SS troops)

Diary of a Man in Despair (Tagebuch eines Verzweifelten) is a journal by the German writer Friedrich Reck-Malleczewen during the 1930s and 1940s, expressing his passionate opposition to Adolf Hitler and Nazism. It was originally published in 1947, but received little recognition. It has since been republished in English and has become regarded as a classic statement about Nazi Germany. The New York Times said the journal is stunning to read because, in it, invective achieves the level of art and hatred achieves a tragic grandeur.

== Text ==
The journal contains thirty-nine entries covering the period from May 1936 to October 1944. The entries express Reck's passionate hatred of Adolf Hitler and the Nazis, whom Reck describes as "vicious apes."

In one entry, Reck relates a meeting with Heinrich Himmler in 1934 at which Himmler asked Reck for information. Surprised at Himmler's request, Reck asked Himmler why the "Fouché of the Third Reich" (in reference to Joseph Fouché, the notorious French Minister of Police under Napoleon) needed information from him. Reck relates that Himmler clearly had no idea who Fouché was.

Reck states that he had met Hitler a few times, and in the entry for 11 August 1936 he describes an occasion when Hitler had delivered a diatribe that had left Reck and his companions speechless. After Hitler had departed, one of Reck's companions opened a window to let some fresh air in and dispel the feeling of "oppression". It was as if the room had been contaminated by the "unclean essence of a monstrosity".

In the entry for 11 August 1936, Reck describes how he once saw Hitler dining alone in a Munich restaurant, and expresses regret that he had not shot him dead when he had the chance. He regarded Hitler at the time as a character out of a comic strip, and refrained from shooting him, although he had a loaded revolver with him. The entry ends with a prescient description of how Hitler's end will come down upon him from every possible direction.

Reck knew his journal put his life at risk. In the entry for 9 September 1937, he describes how he has to hide his writing from the Nazis:

My friends have taken the occasion to give me warning about my own writings. Driven as I am by my own inner necessity, I must ignore the warning and continue these notes, which are intended as a contribution to the cultural history of the Nazi period. Night after night, I hide this record deep in the woods on my land ... constantly on watch lest I am observed, constantly changing my hiding place. And this is how we now live, my vanished friends. Do you, who left Germany four and more years ago, have any idea of how completely without legal status we are, of what it is to be threatened with denunciation at any time by the next hysteric who comes along?

Despite this caution, Reck was, by his own accounting, open about his anti-Nazi views with friends and family, some of whom were intensely loyal to the Nazi regime.

The final entry, dated 14 October 1944, describes how Reck had been arrested and subsequently charged with "undermining the morale of the armed forces". This was a serious charge carrying the death penalty. In a following hearing, he was cleared and released after the unexpected intervention of an SS general, whom Reck refers to as "General Dtl". Reck then makes the prescient statement that the Nazis will be rooted out, pursued remorselessly and reduced to their true level.

== Publication ==
The journal was first published as Tagebuch eines Verzweifelten in 1947 by the Stuttgart publishing house of Burger Verlag, but received little attention at the time. In 1966 it was reprinted as a paperback, which was followed by translation into a number of languages. An English-language translation by Paul Rubens then appeared in 1970, published by the Macmillan Company, and was reprinted in 2000. In 2013 it was republished by The New York Review of Books, with an afterword by Richard J. Evans.
