= Comedian Harmonists =

German close harmony ensemble 1928–1934

Comedian Harmonists (from left: Robert Biberti, Erich Collin, Erwin Bootz, Roman Cycowski, Harry Frommermann, Asparuh "Ari" Leschnikoff)

The Comedian Harmonists were an all-male German close harmony ensemble that performed between 1928 and 1934. The group consisted of Harry Frommermann (tenor buffo), Asparuh "Ari" Leschnikoff (first tenor), Erich A. Collin (second tenor), Roman Cycowski (baritone), Robert Biberti (bass), and Erwin Bootz (pianist).

The hallmark of the Comedian Harmonists was its members' ability to blend their voices together so that the individual singers could appear and disappear back into the vocal texture. Its repertoire ranged from the folk and classical songs arranged by Frommermann to popular songs of the day by writers such as Peter Igelhoff, Werner R. Heymann and Paul Abraham.

== History ==
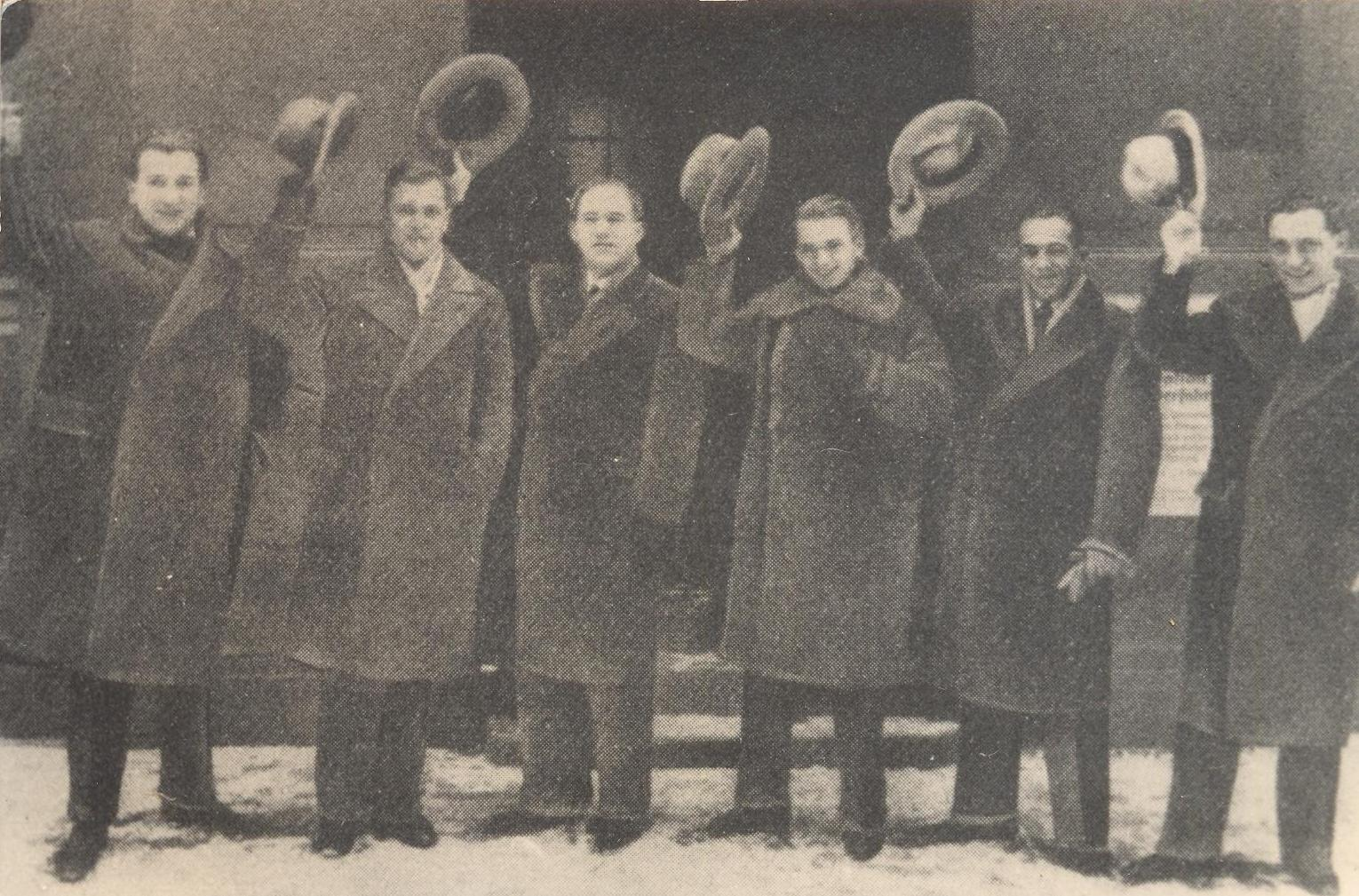
Comedian Harmonists in Berlin

In 1927, unemployed actor Harry Frommermann was inspired by The Revelers, a jazz-influenced popular vocal group from the United States, to create a German group of the same format. According to Douglas Friedman's 2010 book The Comedian Harmonists, in August 1929 both groups appeared on the same bill at the Scala (Berlin) (former Berliner Eispalast) and became friends. Frommermann held auditions in his flat on Stubenrauchstraße 47 in Berlin-Friedenau, and, once the group was assembled, it began rehearsals. After some initial failures, the Harmonists became popular throughout Europe, visiting the United States, and appearing in 21 films.

The members of the group were:

Ari Leschnikoff	(1897–1978)	first tenor
Erich A. Collin	(1899–1961)	second tenor
Harry Frommermann	(1906–1975)	tenor buffo
Roman Cycowski	(1901–1998)	baritone
Robert Biberti	(1902–1985)	bass
Erwin Bootz	(1907–1982)	pianist

The group's success continued into the early 1930s, but eventually ran into trouble with the Nazi regime: three of the group members – Frommermann, Collin, and Cycowski – were either Jewish or of Jewish descent, and Bootz had married a Jewish woman. The Nazis progressively made the group's professional life more difficult, initially banning pieces by Jewish composers, and finally prohibiting them from performing in public. The group's last concert in Germany was in Hanover on March 25, 1934, after which they sailed to the United States on SS Europa and gave several concerts. Fearing internment if they stayed abroad, however, they eventually returned home amid bitter internal disputes.

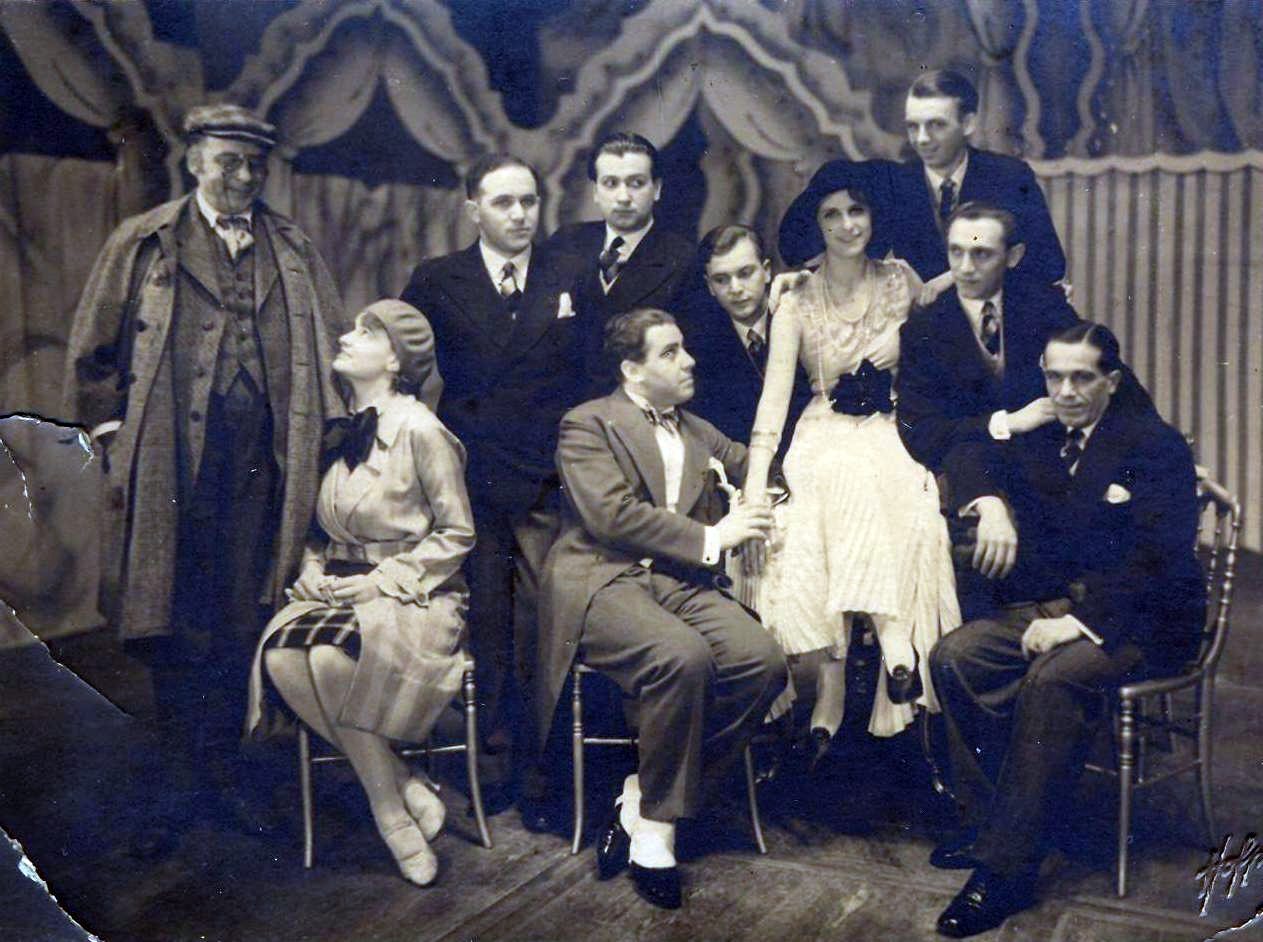

Frommermann, Cycowski, and Collin subsequently fled Germany and formed a new group in Vienna, which performed under the names "Comedian Harmonists" and "Comedy Harmonists" with a new pianist, bass, and high tenor. The remaining members in Germany likewise replaced their counterparts in a successor group named "Das Meistersextett" (as the authorities forbade an English-language name). Neither group was able to achieve the original success of the Comedian Harmonists, with the German group stifled by political in-fighting and heavy censorship, as well as the war draft (call-up). The emigrant group toured across Europe (excluding Germany and, from 1938 on, Austria), but also in the Soviet Union, South Africa, South America, and Australia where they were particularly successful and considered settling down after the Australian government offered them citizenship. However, after a North American concert tour in 1940, they were unable to return to Australia. Their last concert was in Richmond, Indiana, on May 1, 1940. After that, they were unable to find work in America due to hostility toward German entertainers, and the group split up.

The Bulgarian Asparuh Leschnikoff (also spelt Leshnikov) returned to his fatherland in 1938 and started a solo career. By 1941, both groups had broken up. Although all members survived the war, they never re-formed after the war.

Erich Collin created a new group in the late 1940s, consisting of himself (now as a baritone), Jack Cathcart (Piano), Fred Bixler (First Tenor), Murray Pollack (Second Tenor), Nicolai Shutorev (Buffo) and Arthur Atkins (Bass). When Shutorev died unexpectedly while the group was on tour in Norway in September 1948, Erich Collin asked Harry Frommermann to jump in as a replacement, and so two of the original Comedian Harmonists were reunited on stage. They continued the tour and recorded six songs for the label "Le Chant du Monde" in Basel in 1949. Shortly afterwards the group disbanded, allegedly due to a lack of discipline among the American members.

The group remained largely forgotten until filmmaker Eberhard Fechner created a four-hour black-and-white television documentary, in which he interviewed the surviving members in 1975, who were scattered throughout the world. The documentary aired over two nights in German in 1977 and caused a resurgence of interest in the music of the Comedian Harmonists, with their records being released on vinyl. In 1979 Erwin Bootz and Robert Biberti received the certificate and the trophy of the Deutscher Schallplattenpreis in the category Historic Recordings/Entertainment for the double-LP, Die Comedian Harmonists Story, Odeon 1 C 148-32 974 M .

They won recognition from the musical entertainment industry in 1998 when they won an honorary award of the Echo Music Prize from the Deutsche Phono-Akademie.

== Dramatic representations ==
They were the subject of the 1997 German movie Comedian Harmonists, released in the United States in 1999 as The Harmonists. In the film, actors lip synched to the musical performances of the group's original recordings.

The 1997 film directly led to a musical play about the group, Veronika, der Lenz ist da – Die Comedian Harmonists, which opened at the Komödie in Berlin in December 1997. When this production closed, the actors who had played the original sextet formed a new group called the Berlin Comedian Harmonists, which recreates the Comedian Harmonists' repertoire.

In 1998, the story of the Comedian Harmonists was depicted in documentary musical theater, in a production entitled "Band in Berlin" performed at the American Music Theatre Festival in Philadelphia. The production, which then played for three weeks at Broadway's Helen Hayes Theater in March 1999, featured the singing group Hudson Shad.

Harmony: A New Musical about the Comedian Harmonists, with music by Barry Manilow and book and lyrics by Bruce Sussman, premiered at the La Jolla Playhouse in the fall of 1997, and played at the Alliance Theatre in Atlanta from September 6, 2013, to October 6, then moved in early 2014 to the Ahmanson Theatre in Los Angeles. The National Yiddish Theatre Folksbiene in New York City mounted Harmony during March to May 2022, directed by Warren Carlyle. In April 2023 it was announced that the show would open at Broadway's Ethel Barrymore Theatre on November 13 of that same year. Receiving mixed-to-positive reviews, the production, staged by Warren Carlyle and featuring Chip Zien and Julie Benko, closed on February 4, 2024.

== Selected filmography ==
- Bombs on Monte Carlo (1931)
- Princess, At Your Orders! (1931)
- Spies at the Savoy Hotel (1932)

== Discography ==
- Ah Maria, Mari
- Ali Baba
- An der schönen blauen Donau ("The Blue Danube")
- Auf dem Heuboden ("In the Hayloft")
- Auf Wiedersehen, My Dear ("See You, My Dear")
- Baby
- Barcarole
- Bin kein Hauptmann, bin kein großes Tier ("I'm No Officer, I'm No Hot Shot")
- Blume von Hawaii ("Flower From Hawaii")
- Creole Love Call by Duke Ellington
- Das ist die Liebe der Matrosen ("That's The Sailors' Love")
- Der Onkel Bumba aus Kalumba tanzt nur Rumba ("Uncle Bumba From Kalumba Only Dances The Rumba")
- Die Dorfmusik ("The Village Music")
- Die Liebe kommt, die Liebe geht ("Love Comes, Love Goes")
- Du bist nicht die erste ("You're Not The First One")
- Ein bißchen Leichtsinn kann nicht schaden ("A Little Carelessness Can't Hurt")
- Ein Freund, ein guter Freund ("A Friend, A Good Friend")
- Ein Lied geht um die Welt ("A Song Goes Around The World")
- Ein neuer Frühling wird in die Heimat kommen ("A New Spring Will Come Home")
- Eine kleine Frühlingsweise ("A Little Spring Melody")
- Einmal schafft's jeder ("Everyone Does It Once")
- Eins, zwei, drei und vier, glücklich bin ich nur mit dir ("One, Two, Three And Four, I'm Only Happy When I'm With You")
- Es führt kein and'rer Weg zur Seligkeit ("There's No Other Way to Bliss")
- Florestan 1., Prince De Monaco ("Florestan The First, Prince Of Monaco")
- Fünf-Uhr-Tee Bei Familie Kraus ("Five-O'-Clock-Tea With The Kraus Family")
- Gitarren, spielt auf ("Guitars, Play")
- Guten Tag, gnädige Frau ("Good Day, Madam")
- Guter Mond, du gehst so stille
- Hallo, was machst Du heut', Daisy? ("Hello, Whatcha Doin' Today, Daisy?" from "You're Driving Me Crazy")
- Ich küsse Ihre Hand, Madam ("I Kiss Your Hand Madam")
- In einem kühlen Grunde ("In A Cool Place")
- Irgendwo auf der Welt ("Somewhere In the World")
- Jetzt trinken wir noch eins ("We drink one more beer")
- Kannst Du pfeifen, Johanna? ("Can you Whistle, Johanna?")
- Mein kleiner grüner Kaktus ("My Little Green Cactus")
- Ohne Dich (Stormy Weather)
- Puppenhochzeit ("Dolls' Wedding")
- Schlafe, mein Prinzchen, schlaf ein ("Sleep, My little Prince, Go To Sleep")
- Schöne Isabella von Kastilien ("Beautiful Isabel from Castile")
- Schöne Lisa, süße Lisa ("Beautiful Lisa, Sweet Lisa")
- Tag und Nacht (Night and Day)
- Ungarischer Tanz Nr. 5 ("Hungarian Dance No. 5")
- Veronika, der Lenz ist da ("Veronika, Spring is here")
- Wenn die Sonja russisch tanzt ("When Sonja Dances Russian-like")
- Wenn der Wind weht über das Meer ("When The Wind Blows Over The Sea")
- Wenn ich vergnügt bin, muß ich singen ("When I'm Merry, I Must Sing")
- Whispering
- Wir sind von Kopf bis Fuß auf Liebe eingestellt ("Falling in Love Again (Can't Help It)")
- Wochenend und Sonnenschein ("Weekend and Sunshine") / Happy Days Are Here Again
