= Mandell Weiss Theatre =

- Interactive map of Mandell Weiss Theatre
- Address: 2910 La Jolla Village Dr, La Jolla, CA 92093
- Location: La Jolla, California
- Coordinates: 32.870987°N 117.241257°W
- Owner: University of California San Diego
- Capacity: 492 (Arch Theater)
- Type: Playhouse

Construction
- Opened: 1991
- Cost: $4.9 Million
- Architect: Antoine Predock

Tenant
- La Jolla Playhouse

Website
- http://theatre.ucsd.edu/places/theatres/weiss.html

The Mandell Weiss Theatre is a theatre located on the campus of the University of California, San Diego in La Jolla, California. It was the first La Jolla Playhouse theatre, introduced in 1983. The 492-seat proscenium arch theatre, with two front rows of removable seats, is the largest theatre at the La Jolla Playhouse.

== History ==
The La Jolla Playhouse played at a prior venue and moved here in 1991 when opened.
