= Julie Benko =

American actress and singer (born 1989)

- Born: March 24, 1989 (age 37); Washington, D.C., U.S.
- Education: New York University Tisch School of the Arts (BFA, MFA)
- Occupations: Actor; singer
- Years active: 2008–present
- Known for: Funny Girl
- Spouse: Jason Yeager (m. 2021)
- Children: 1

Julie Benko (born March 24, 1989) is an American actor and singer. Benko portrayed Fanny Brice in the Broadway revival of Funny Girl (2022) and originated the role of Ruth Stern in the Broadway musical Harmony (2023).

== Early life and education ==
Benko was born on March 24, 1989, in Washington, D.C. When she was three years old, her family moved to Fairfield, Connecticut. She attended Fairfield Ludlowe High School.

When Benko was 14, she was cast as Hodel in the musical Fiddler on the Roof which was her first theatre production, organized at a local Jewish Community Center in Bridgeport, Connecticut. Her parents and sister were also cast. In 2007, she portrayed Lizzie in Baby alongside her father at the Curtain Call Theater in Stamford, Connecticut.

Benko graduated from New York University's Tisch School of the Arts in 2013 with a Bachelor of Fine Arts in Drama and again in 2021 with a Master of Fine Arts in Acting.

== Career ==
Benko first began her professional acting career in 2008 when she understudied five roles in the national tour of Spring Awakening. She later joined the 25th anniversary tour of Les Misérables as an ensemble member and the understudy of Cosette, ultimately taking over the role of Cosette full time. Benko has also played multiple off-Broadway and regional roles, such as Girl in Once and Emily Webb in Our Town. From 2015 to 2016, she was the understudy for Hodel and Chava and covered six other roles in the Broadway production of Fiddler on the Roof.

In 2017, she won the gold medal at the American Traditions Vocal Competition in Savannah, Georgia. Benko released her debut jazz album Introducing Julie Benko on October 20, 2017, which includes "Tomorrow Is A Day For You," a song celebrating the legalization of same-sex marriage in the case Obergefell v. Hodges.

Benko made her debut as a director and writer for the short film The Newlywed's Guide to Physical Intimacy in 2020, which is about a Hasidic Jewish couple on their wedding night. The film received an honorable mention from the New Faces New Voices Audience Choice Award and the Audience Award for Comedy from the Online New England Film Festival.

Benko was the standby for the role of Fanny Brice in the 2022 Broadway revival of Funny Girl, with her first performance on April 29, 2022. Starting on August 2, 2022, she became a replacement for Beanie Feldstein following Feldstein's exit from the show, and became the Fanny Brice alternate on September 6, 2022, once Lea Michele took over the role. Her performance was met with positive reviews, with The New York Times naming her as the breakout star for theatre in 2022. She was listed as one of Crain's New York Business's 2022 "40 Under 40" and The New York Sun called her "[t]he Fanny Brice of our time."

In late 2022, it was announced that Benko would play the role of Ruth Stern in the musical Harmony, which opened November 13, 2023.

Benko released the song "Start With a Bang" on February 13, 2023, written by Dan Mertzlufft and Kate Leonard with accompaniment by the Broadway Sinfonietta. Benko was referenced in The Simpsons episode "The Many Saints of Springfield".

In 2024, Benko took on the title role of Jane Eyre in the Theatre Raleigh chamber version of the musical of the same name by Paul Gordon. Also in 2024, Benko was part of the Carnegie Hall concert production of Stephen Sondheim and James Goldman's musical Follies.

Benko played the role of Emma Goldman in Ragtime from January 6 to March 29, 2026.

== Personal life ==
Benko is Jewish. Benko met musician Jason Yeager in 2013 and they got married in 2021. The pair released an album named Hand in Hand in 2022. The two have a daughter who was born on November 28, 2024.

== Theater credits ==
Title	Year(s)	Role(s)	Theatre	Notes	Ref(s)
Spring Awakening	2008–2010	Ensemble u/s Wendla, Ilse, Anna, Thea, Martha	—N/a	1st national tour	
Les Misérables	2011–2013	Ensemble u/s Cosette	—N/a	25th anniversary tour	
Les Misérables	2014	Cosette	North Carolina Theatre		
Les Misérables	2014-2015	Ensemble u/s Cosette	Imperial Theatre	Broadway revival	
The Golem of Havana	2014	Rebeca	Barrington Stage		
Fiddler on the Roof	2015–2016	u/s Hodel, Chava, Shprintze, Bielke, Shaindel, Rivka	Broadway Theatre	Broadway revival	
Rags	2017	Bella	TheaterWorks Silicon Valley		
Bar Mitzvah Boy	2018	Lesley	York Theatre	Off-Broadway	
Once	2018	Girl	Mason Street Warehouse		
Our Town	2018	Emily Webb	Weston Playhouse		
The Fantasticks	2019	Luisa	Weston Playhouse		
Once	2021	Girl	Hangar Theatre		
Funny Girl	2022	s/b Fanny Brice	August Wilson Theatre	Broadway revival	
Funny Girl	2022	Fanny Brice	August Wilson Theatre	Broadway revival	
Funny Girl	2022–2023	Fanny Brice (Alternate)	August Wilson Theatre	Broadway revival	
Harmony	2023–2024	Ruth Stern	Ethel Barrymore Theatre	Original Broadway production	
Jane Eyre	2024	Jane Eyre	Theatre Raleigh		
My Fair Lady	2025	Eliza Doolittle	Aspen Music Festival		
Guys and Dolls	2025-2026	Sarah Brown	Sidney Harman Hall	Shakespeare Theatre Company	
Guys and Dolls	2026	Sarah Brown	Aspen Music Festival	Concert	
Ragtime	2026	Emma Goldman	Vivian Beaumont Theatre	Broadway revival	

== Filmography ==
Year	Title	Role	Notes
2020	The Newlywed's Guide to Physical Intimacy	Bride	Also director and writer

== Discography ==
- Introducing Julie Benko (2017)
- Hand in Hand (with Jason Yeager, 2022)
- Christmas With You (EP) (2023)

== Awards and nominations ==
Year	Award	Category	Nominated work	Results
2024	Broadway.com Audience Award	Favorite Featured Actress in a Musical	Harmony	Nominated
