= Friedrich Reck-Malleczewen =

German writer (1884-1945)

Friedrich Percyval Reck-Malleczewen
- Born: 11 August 1884; Malleczewen, Prussia, German Empire
- Died: 16 February 1945 (aged 60); Dachau concentration camp, Germany
- Occupations: Physician, Author
- Spouses: Anna Louise Büttner (m. 1908; div. 1930) Irmgard von Borcke (after 1935)
- Children: 6
- Relatives: Herman Reck
- Awards: Righteous Among the Nations

Academic work
- School or tradition: Traditionalist conservatism, Anti-fascism
- Notable works: Diary of a Man in Despair Bomben auf Monte Carlo (novel)

Friedrich Percyval Reck-Malleczewen (11 August 1884 – February 1945) was a German author. His best-known work is Diary of a Man in Despair, a journal in which he expressed his passionate opposition to Adolf Hitler and Nazism. He was eventually arrested by the Nazis and murdered at the Dachau concentration camp.

== Life and work ==
Friedrich (Fritz) Reck-Malleczewen was born on the estate of Malleczewen, Masuria (Maleczewo, Poland), the son of the Prussian politician and landowner Hermann Reck. He originally wanted to be a musician, and at one point studied medicine in Innsbruck. He served as an officer in the Prussian Army but was dismissed due to diabetes, and later married Anna Louise Büttner in 1908. They had three daughters and a son before divorcing in 1930.

Graduating in 1911, Reck was a ship's doctor, in American waters, for a year. Thereafter he moved to Stuttgart to become a journalist and theatre critic for the Süddeutsche Zeitung, moving to Pasing near Munich in 1914. In 1933 Reck converted to Catholicism, and in 1935 he married Irmgard von Borcke, with whom he had another three daughters.

Throughout the 1920s and 1930s, Reck was also a novelist, mainly of children's adventure stories. One book, Bomben auf Monte Carlo, has been filmed four times. Many of his books were banned by the Nazis, and more were not published until years after his death. In 1937 he published a historical novel on the Münster rebellion, Bockelson: History of a Mass Delusion, seen as a critical allegory of Hitler and Nazism.

Today his best-known work is Diary of a Man in Despair (Tagebuch eines Verzweifelten), his journal of life as a dissident intellectual under dystopian Nazi rule. The final version of the diary begins in May 1936, commenting on the death of German philosopher Oswald Spengler.

Reck was fascinated by the idea that the upheavals being caused in 1930s Germany by the extremism of the Nazis were not unique, but were rather a repetition of a phenomenon that happens in cycles throughout history. His key comparison was to the Munster Rebellion, a radically repressive and violent episode in 16th-century Germany on which he had done substantial research. He wrote:

I stand before these 400-year-old records, startled by the thought that the resemblance may not be coincidence at all, but may be determined by some frightful law decreeing periodic draining of a psychic abscess.... Isn't this exactly what happened in Munster, so conservative before and after the event? Doesn't this explain how all of this could have happened to a basically orderly and hardworking people, without resistance from those dedicated to the good in life, in the same kind of grim and incalculably vast cosmic convulsion which from the first day of the Hitler regime... has in some unfathomable way turned on its head concepts like mine and thine, right and wrong, virtue and vice, God and the Devil?

The Diary was published for the first time in 1947, republished in 1970 in English translation by Paul Rubens, and reissued by New York Review Books in 2013. A New York Times review of the book at the time of the 1970 publication said "It is stunning to read, for it is not often that invective reaches the level of art, and rarer still that hatred assumes a tragic grandeur."

== Arrest and death ==
Reck noted in his journal, in October 1944, that the Nazi authorities were becoming suspicious of him. On 13 October, he was arrested and charged under German military law with the serious offence of "undermining the morale of the armed forces," which could be punished by death on the guillotine. After some days in prison, he was released following the surprise intervention of an SS general. However, he was arrested again on 31 December and charged with "insulting the German currency." This appeared to be the result of a letter he had written to his publisher, in which he had complained that the inflation rate was eroding the value of his royalties. On 9 January 1945, he was transferred to the Dachau concentration camp, where accounts of his death differ; one source suggests that Reck was executed there 23 February, shot in the neck (Genickschuss), while the official death certificate recorded a death from typhus on February 16.

Dutch writer Nico Rost later claimed that in April 1945, he encountered a man leaving the Dachau camp infirmary who claimed to be Reck, a report which cast the exact date and time of Reck's death into some debate. Rost later recanted this claim in his book Goethe in Dachau.

== Bibliography ==
- Uradel, 1914
- Mit Admiral Spee, 1936 (written 1914/15)
- Aus Tsingtau entkommen, 1916
- Der Admiral der Roten Flagge, 1917
- Monteton, 1924
- Die Siedlung Unitrusttown, 1925
- Frau Übersee, 1926
- Liebesreigen und Fanfaren, 1927
- Die Dame aus New York, 1928
- Sven entdeckt das Paradies, 1928
- Jean Paul Marat, 1929
- Bomben auf Monte Carlo, 1930
- Des Tieres Fall, 1931
- Hundertmark, 1934
- Krach um Payta, 1935
- Ein Mannsbild namens Prack, 1935
- Sophie Dorothee, 1936
- Bockelson, 1937
- La Paloma, 1937
- Spiel im Park, 1937
- Der grobe Brief, 1940
- Diana Pontecorvo, 1944
- Das Ende der Termiten, 1946
- Charlotte Corday, 1947
- Tagebuch eines Verzweifelten, 1947 (Diary of a Man in Despair)
