= List of works by Thea von Harbou =

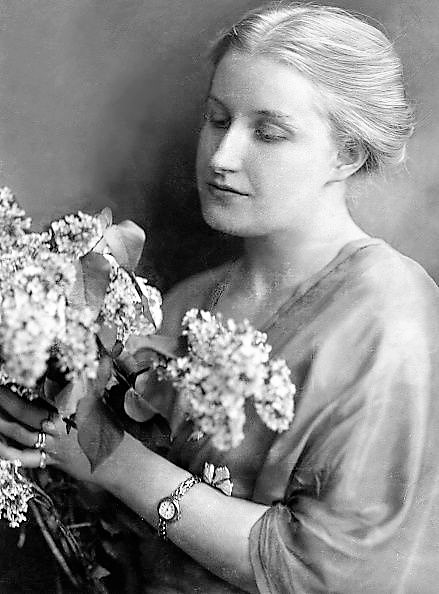
Thea von Harbou circa 1928

Thea Gabriele von Harbou (27 December 1888 – 1 July 1954) was a German screenwriter, novelist and film director.

== Filmography ==
Harbou made the following films.

=== Screenwriter ===
- The Legend of Holy Simplicity (dir. Joe May, 1920)
- The Wandering Image (dir. Fritz Lang, 1920)
- The Women of Gnadenstein (dir. Robert Dinesen and Joe May, 1921)
- Four Around a Woman (dir. Fritz Lang, 1921) - Screenplay based on a play by Rolf E. Vanloo
- Destiny (dir. Fritz Lang, 1921)
- The Indian Tomb (dir. Joe May, 1921)
- The Burning Soil (dir. F. W. Murnau, 1922)
- Dr. Mabuse the Gambler (dir. Fritz Lang, 1922) - Screenplay based on Dr. Mabuse by Norbert Jacques
- Phantom (dir. F. W. Murnau, 1922) - Screenplay based on a novel by Gerhart Hauptmann
- Princess Suwarin (dir. Johannes Guter, 1923) - Screenplay based on a novel by Ludwig Wolff
- The Expulsion (dir. F. W. Murnau, 1923) - Screenplay based on a play by Carl Hauptmann
- The Grand Duke's Finances (dir. F. W. Murnau, 1924) - Screenplay based on a novel by Frank Heller
- Die Nibelungen—Part 1: Siegfried (dir. Fritz Lang, 1924) - Screenplay based on the Nibelungenlied
- Die Nibelungen—Part 2: Kriemhild's Revenge (dir. Fritz Lang, 1924) - Screenplay based on the Nibelungenlied
- Michael (dir. Carl Theodor Dreyer, 1924) - Screenplay based on a novel by Herman Bang
- Chronicles of the Gray House (dir. Arthur von Gerlach, 1925) - Screenplay based on a novella by Theodor Storm
- Metropolis (dir. Fritz Lang, 1927)
- Spione (dir. Fritz Lang, 1928)
- Woman in the Moon (dir. Fritz Lang, 1929)
- M (dir. Fritz Lang, 1931)
- The First Right of the Child (dir. Fritz Wendhausen, 1932)
- The Marathon Runner (dir. E. A. Dupont, 1933) - Screenplay based on a novel by Werner Scheff
- The Testament of Dr. Mabuse (dir. Fritz Lang, 1933) - Screenplay based on Dr. Mabuse by Norbert Jacques
- Hanneles Himmelfahrt (dir. Thea von Harbou, 1934) - Screenplay based on The Assumption of Hannele by Gerhart Hauptmann
- What Am I Without You (dir. Arthur Maria Rabenalt, 1934)
- Elisabeth and the Fool (dir. Thea von Harbou), 1934)
- Princess Turandot (dir. Gerhard Lamprecht, 1934) - Screenplay based on Turandot
- The Old and the Young King (dir. Hans Steinhoff, 1935)
- An Ideal Husband (dir. Herbert Selpin, 1935) - Screenplay based on An Ideal Husband by Oscar Wilde
- I Was Jack Mortimer (dir. Carl Froelich, 1935) - Screenplay based on I Was Jack Mortimer by Alexander Lernet-Holenia
- The Man with the Paw (dir. Rudolf van der Noss, 1935) - Screenplay based on a novel by Fritz Zeckendorf
- The Impossible Woman (dir. Johannes Meyer, 1936) - Screenplay based on a novel by Mia Fellmann
- Escapade (dir. Erich Waschneck, 1936) - Screenplay based on My Official Wife by Richard Henry Savage
- A Woman of No Importance (dir. Hans Steinhoff, 1936) - Screenplay based on A Woman of No Importance by Oscar Wilde
- The Ruler (dir. Veit Harlan, 1937) - Screenplay based on a play by Gerhart Hauptmann
- Don't Promise Me Anything (dir. Wolfgang Liebeneiner, 1937) - Screenplay based on a play by Charlotte Rissmann
- The Broken Jug (dir. Gustav Ucicky, 1937) - Screenplay based on The Broken Jug by Heinrich von Kleist
- Mother Song (dir. Carmine Gallone, 1937)
- Youth (dir. Veit Harlan, 1938) - Screenplay based on a play by Max Halbe
- The Woman at the Crossroads (dir. Josef von Báky, 1938) - Screenplay based on a novel by Alice Lyttkens
- Covered Tracks (dir. Veit Harlan, 1938) - Screenplay based on a radio drama by Hans Rothe
- Stars of Variety (dir. Josef von Báky, 1939)
- Hurrah! I'm a Father (dir. Kurt Hoffmann, 1939)
- Lauter Liebe (dir. Heinz Rühmann, 1940)
- Wie konntest Du, Veronika! (dir. Milo Harbich, 1940)
- Am Abend auf der Heide (dir. Jürgen von Alten, 1940) - Screenplay based on a novel by F. B. Cortan
- Clarissa (dir. Gerhard Lamprecht, 1941) (uncredited)
- Annelie (dir. Josef von Báky, 1941) - Screenplay based on a play by Walter Lieck
- With the Eyes of a Woman (dir. Karl Georg Külb, 1942) - Screenplay based on a novel by Zsolt Harsányi
- Maria Malibran (dir. Guido Brignone, 1943)
- My Summer Companion (dir. Fritz Peter Buch, 1943) - Screenplay based on a novel by Klaus-Erich Boerner
- Die Gattin (dir. Georg Jacoby, 1943) - Screenplay based on two plays by János Bókay
- A Wife for Three Days (dir. Fritz Kirchhoff, 1944) - Screenplay based on a novel by Elisabeth Gürt
- Via Mala (dir. Josef von Báky, 1945) - Screenplay based on Via Mala by John Knittel
- Journey to Happiness (dir. Erich Engel, 1944/1948)
- Erzieherin gesucht (dir. Ulrich Erfurth, 1944/1950)
- A Day Will Come (dir. Rudolf Jugert, 1950) - Screenplay based on a novella by Ernst Penzoldt
- Dr. Holl (dir. Rolf Hansen, 1951)
- Your Heart Is My Homeland (dir. Richard Häussler, 1953) - Screenplay based on a novel by Irmgard Wurmbrand

=== Director ===
- Elisabeth and the Fool (1934)
- Hanneles Himmelfahrt (1934)

== Books ==
Harbou wrote the following books.

- Wenn's Morgen wird, 1905
- Weimar: Ein Sommertagstraum, verse stories 1908
- Die nach uns kommen, a village novel, 1910
- Von Engeln und Teufelchen, ten stories, 1913
- Deutsche Frauen. Bilder stillen Heldentums, five stories, 1914
- Der unsterbliche Acker, a war novel, 1915
- Gold im Feuer, novel, 1915
- Der Krieg und die Frauen, eight stories, 1915
- Die Masken des Todes. Sieben Geschichten in einer, 1915
- Die Flucht der Beate Hoyermann, 1916
- Die Deutsche Frau im Weltkrieg, essays, 1916
- Aus Abend und Morgen ein neuer Tag, 1916
- Du junge Wacht am Rhein!, 1917
- Adrian Drost und sein Land, 1918
- Das indische Grabmal (The Indian Tomb), 1918, English translation 2016
- Der belagerte Tempel, 1917
- Die nach uns kommen, 1918
- Legenden, five stories including "Holy Simplicity"), 1919
- Sonderbare Heilige, ten stories, 1919
- Die unheilige Dreifaltigkeit, 1920
- Das Haus ohne Tür und Fenster, 1920
- Gute Kameraden, 1920
- Gedichte, 1920
- Das Nibelungenbuch, 1924
- Mondscheinprinzeßchen, 1925
- Metropolis, 1925, English translation 1927
- Der Insel der Unsterblichen, 1926
- Mann zwischen Frauen, 1927
- Frau im Mond (The Rocket to the Moon), 1928, English translation 1930
- Spione, 1929
- Du bist unmöglich, Jo!, novel, 1931
- Liebesbriefe aus St. Florin; Novella, 1935
- Aufblühender Lotos, 1941
- Der Dieb von Bagdad, 1949
- Gartenstraße 64, 1952
