= The Indian Tomb (disambiguation) =

The Indian Tomb is a 1918 novel by Thea von Harbou.

The Indian Tomb may also refer to:

- The Indian Tomb (1921 film), a 1921 German silent film directed by Joe May
- The Indian Tomb (1938 film), a 1938 German film directed by Richard Eichberg
- The Indian Tomb (1959 film), a 1959 West German film directed by Fritz Lang

== See also ==
- The Tiger of Eschnapur
