= Tauperlitz =

Settlement in Bavaria, Germany

Coordinates: 50°18′N 11°58′E

Tauperlitz and Neutauperlitz are two merged former districts in Bavaria, now in the municipality of Döhlau in the district of Hof. The original settlement grew up along an old roadway, and is first mentioned in 1348 in a letter of foundation by Friedrich von Hohenlohe, bishop of Bamberg.

The motte-and-bailey castle of Tauperlitz (Turmhügelburg Tauperlitz), not far from the Southern Regnitz river, is significant in terms of settlement history. In the Margraviate of Brandenburg-Kulmbach there was a manor here that formed part of the Vogtländische Ritterschaft (an association of knightly estates in the Vogtland) and was endowed with the legal right of direct access to the higher courts (Schriftsässigkeit). The Erlöserkirche ("Church of the Redeemer") belongs to the Evangelical-Lutheran Deanery of Hof.

Local noble families like the Uttenhofen, the Rabensteiner zu Döhlau and the Waldenfels were based here. The Rabensteiner occupied Tauperlitz farm in 1398, and Ernst von Waldenfels occupied Tauperlitz Manor from 1790. There remain traces of these families in the form of two stone crosses and a stable house.

A memorial stone in the park commemorates the writer, actress and film director Thea von Harbou, who was born in Tauperlitz. Her works include many screenplays, most notably the original novels/screenplay The Indian Tomb (1918) and Metropolis (1925), adapted by her husband Fritz Lang.

The district road HO 5 connects Tauperlitz with Hof and Kautendorf. The Tauperlitzer Seefest takes place every year at the local lake, the Tauperlitzer See (also known as the Quellitzer See).

== Bibliography ==
- Hans Bucka, Oskar Heland: Die Steinkreuze und Kreuzsteine im Landkreis Hof und in der Stadt Hof, pp. 41–43. Hof 1986
- Hans Bucka, Oskar Heland: Grenzsteine – Flur- und Kleindenkmäler im Landkreis Hof, p. 112. Hoermann, Hof 1991 ISBN 3-88267-040-1
- August Gebeßler: Stadt und Landkreis Hof. Die Kunstdenkmäler von Bayern, Kurzinventare, VII. Band, p. 62. Deutscher Kunstverlag, München 1960
