= The Tiger of Eschnapur =

The Tiger of Eschnapur may refer to:

- The Tiger of Eschnapur (1938 film)
- The Tiger of Eschnapur (1959 film)
- The second part of the 1921 German silent film The Indian Tomb

== See also ==
- The Indian Tomb, the novel from which the films are adapted
