= Rotwang =

Fictional character in the book and film Metropolis; mad scientist

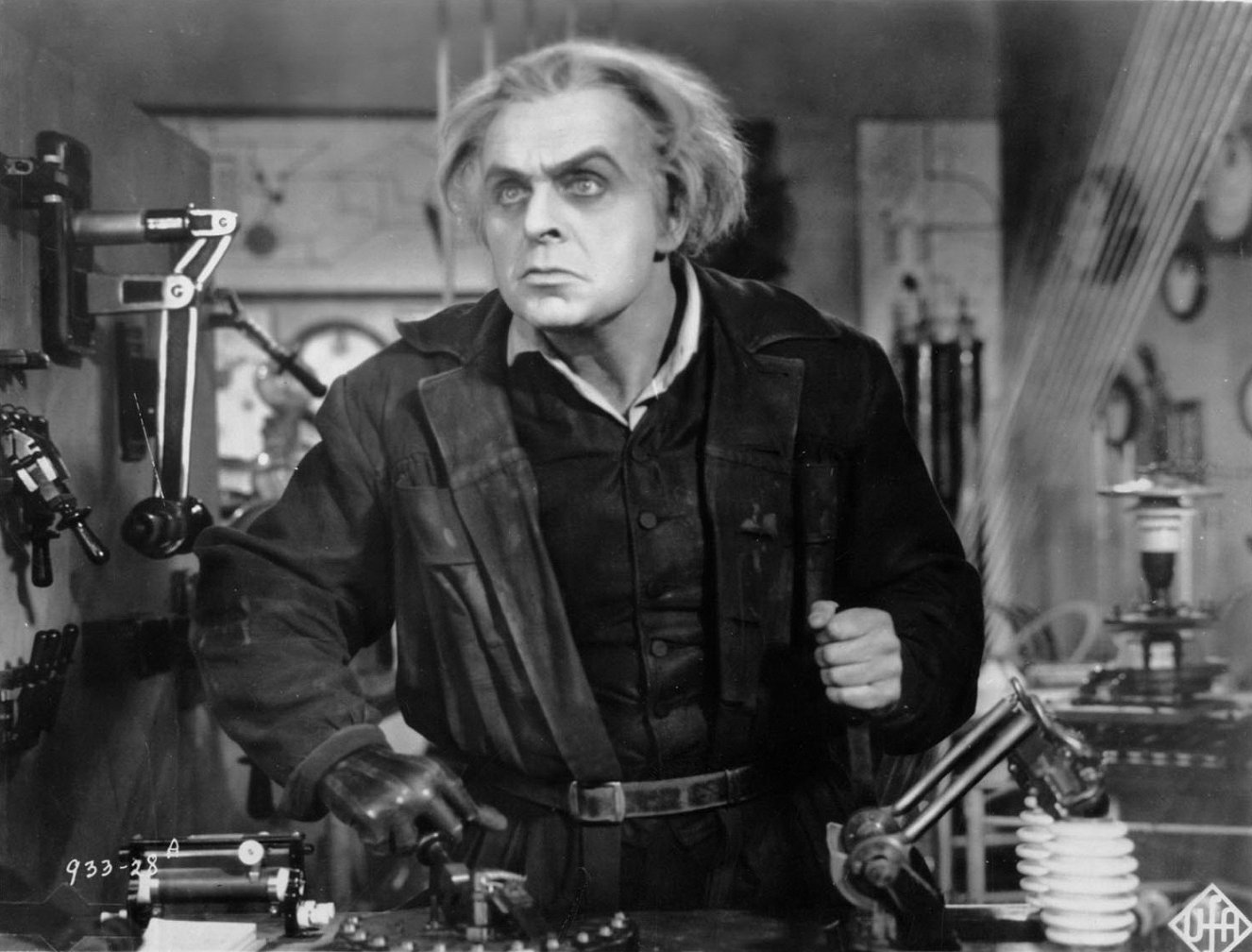
- Rudolf Klein-Rogge as Rotwang in Fritz Lang's film Metropolis
- First appearance: Metropolis
- Created by: Thea von Harbou; Fritz Lang
- Portrayed by: Rudolf Klein-Rogge

In-universe information
- Gender: Male
- Occupation: Scientist

C. A. Rotwang is a fictional character in Fritz Lang's 1927 science fiction film Metropolis, as well as screenwriter Thea von Harbou's original novel Metropolis. In the film, Rotwang was played by Rudolf Klein-Rogge.

== Character overview ==
Rotwang is a brilliant scientist and inventor, whose greatest achievement is the creation of a robot made in the form of a woman (the Maschinenmensch, or machine-human). Originally, he intended to make a replacement for his lost love, Hel, a beautiful woman who eventually chose Joh Fredersen, master of the city and Rotwang's rival, instead of him. She later died while giving birth to Fredersen's son, Freder. Rotwang uses the robot to get revenge against Fredersen and Freder, while pretending that he is using the robot for Fredersen's benefit, and under Fredersen's instructions.

Rotwang, who lost a hand while developing the robot and now wears a fully functioning metal prosthesis in its place, covered by a black glove, lives in a strange old house in the middle of Metropolis; its rough exterior design contrasts sharply with the futuristic elegance of the city. In its basement is a trap door that leads down into a network of catacombs, where Rotwang and Fredersen eavesdrop on a secret meeting of the workers and Maria, their spiritual counselor.

On Fredersen's orders, Rotwang abducts Maria, transfers her appearance to the robot, and releases the duplicate to incite a rebellion among the workers. However, the robot is programmed to obey only Rotwang, who secretly instructs it to cause destructive lust among the wealthy elite of Metropolis as well in a plot to ruin Fredersen. During the ensuing riots and power blackout, Rotwang falls under the delusion that the real Maria is Hel and chases her to the roof of the city's cathedral, with Freder in pursuit. The two men fight on the roof, and Rotwang falls to his death.

== Name ==
The name "Rotwang" derives from the German for "red (rosy) cheek". In the film his name is given on a printed invitation as "C. A. Rotwang" but his first and middle names are not given in full, or mentioned again.

== Cultural influence ==
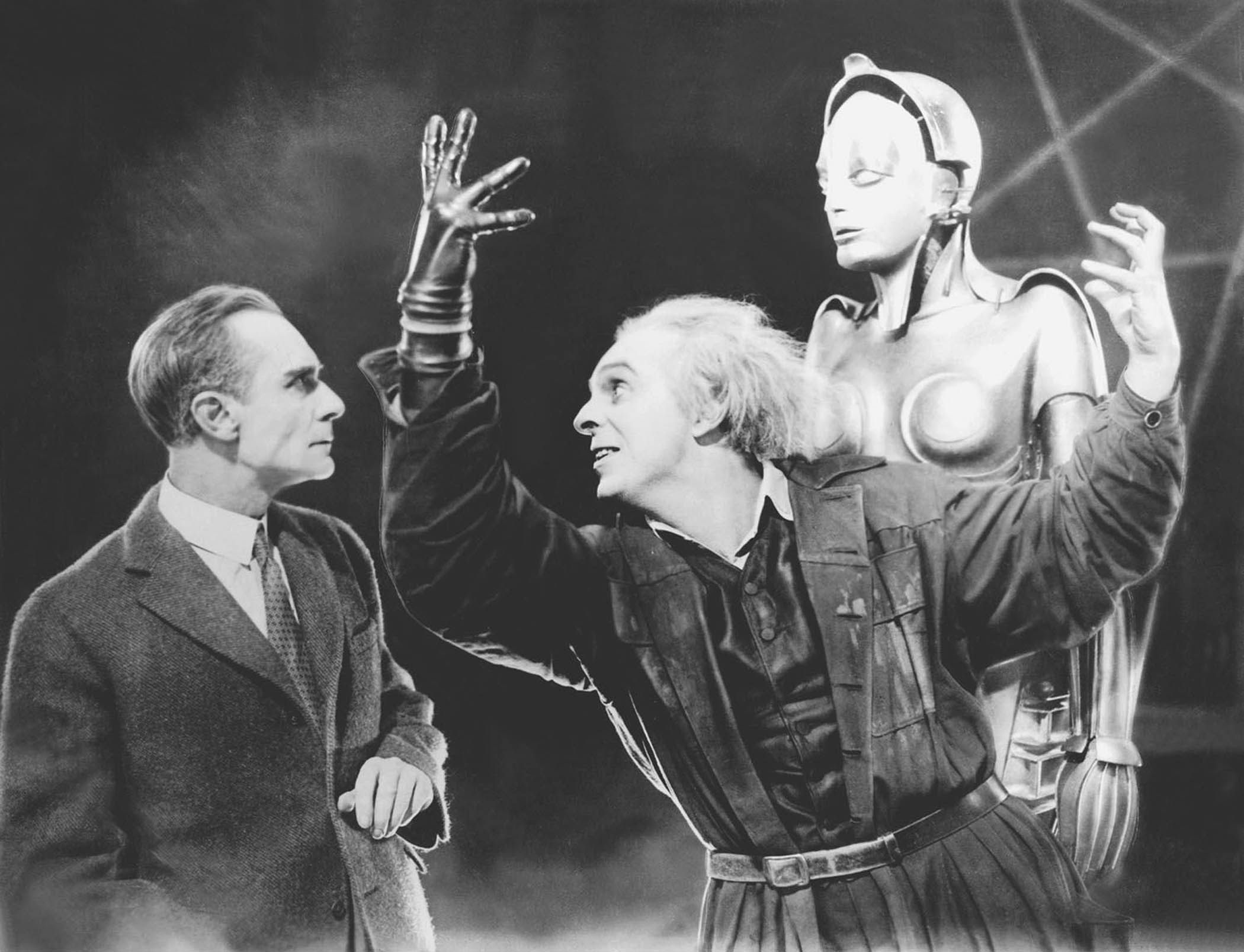
Joh Fredersen, Rotwang and the Maschinenmensch (machine-human).

Rotwang was very influential in the iconography of the mad scientist archetype. His laboratory, with its profusion of Tesla coils and towering switch panels, baroque chemical equipment and pipework, became a stock feature of many later films, including many in the Frankenstein series. Like Victor Frankenstein, he attempts to "play God" by creating life, only to be defeated and destroyed in the end.

Many aspects of Rotwang's appearance and character, particularly the black-gloved "mechanical" hand, turn up in the title character of Dr. Strangelove.

== In popular culture ==
Rotwang, along with Maria, his robot, appears as a member of the Twilight Heroes, a German analogue to The League of Extraordinary Gentlemen, in Alan Moore’s graphic novel The League of Extraordinary Gentlemen: Black Dossier.

He also appears as part of the German forces attempting to create the Red Baron, along with silent film characters Doctor Mabuse, Doctor Caligari and Count Orlok, in Kim Newman's historical fantasy novel The Bloody Red Baron.

In the mainline DC Universe's Rotwang's robot creation became the time traveling villainess Mekanique. Mekanique claims to have traveled to the era of the All-Star Squadron to alter history for her master, and that she succeeded; whether this is true is unknown. Rotwang himself did not appear in the comic. In the Elseworld graphic novel Superman's Metropolis, Lex Luthor is cast in Rotwang's role.

In Osamu Tezuka's Metropolis manga and the later anime film based upon it, Rotwang is replaced by a character named Laughton (though their names are pronounced similarly in Japanese).

In the Yugoslav comic book series Borba, Rotwang is a recurring villain, and is portrayed as a Nazi.

In Before Tomorrowland by Jeff Jensen, a tie-in novel to Tomorrowland, there is a villain named Werner Rotwang. He is an unethical roboticist who defects from the Plus Ultra organization and joins the Nazis to further his research into achieving immortality via robotics.

In the first series of Hergé's Jo, Zette and Jocko adventures, "The Secret Ray", an unnamed scientist unsuccessfully experiments with transferring a human soul into a robot's body.

In Jeffrey Thomas's story "Precious Metal", the character Maria Rotwang kills a gang that has previously killed members of a robot jazz band.
