= Valéry Inkijinoff =

Russian-French actor (1895–1973)

- Валерий Инкижинов
- Inkijinoff in Storm Over Asia (1928)
- Born: 25 March 1895; Bokhan, Russia
- Died: 26 September 1973 (aged 78); Brunoy, France
- Education: Polytechnical Institute of Saint Petersburg
- Occupations: Actor; director; teacher
- Years active: 1928–1972

Valéry Ivanovitch Inkijinoff (Russian: Валерий Иванович Инкижинов, romanized: Valery Ivanovich Inkizhinov; 25 March 1895 – 26 September 1973), sometimes known mononymously as Inkijinoff, was a Russian-French actor, director, acting teacher, and theatre practitioner. Born to a Buryat family in Bokhan, he began his career in Soviet cinema, playing the lead role in Vsevolod Pudovkin's 1928 film Storm Over Asia. He immigrated to France in the 1930s, where he became a favorite villain for exotic adventure and crime films.

== Early life ==
Inkijinoff was born in Bokhan, Irkutsk Governorate to a Christian Buryat father and an ethnic Russian mother. He studied at the Polytechnical Institute of Saint Petersburg, and for a time one of the resident actors of an imperial theater of the city. He studied acting under Vsevolod Meyerhold, where he helped develop the rehearsal technique of biomechanics. He joined Meyerhold's troupe in Moscow, where he also studied with Lev Kuleshov.

== Career ==
At the beginning of his career in Russia, he appeared first as stuntman in a few movies and then as director and as actor. His major lead role during the Russian part of his career is Bair in Storm Over Asia by Vsevolod Pudovkin in 1928, a major Soviet propaganda film about a fictional British consolidation of Mongolia. He was also an actor in the troop of Vsevolod Meyerhold and was then appointed as director of the movie and theater school of Kiev.

In 1930, while in France on a European tour, he refused to return to the USSR. According to Boris Shumyatsky, after Stalin learned Inkijinoff had never returned in 1934, said: "Too bad that the man escaped. Now he, probably, is dying to come back but, alas, too late." He starred in 2 movies while living in the Soviet Union, and contrary to Stalin's assumption, Inkijinoff became immensely popular in Europe, arguably the most successful Soviet actor abroad, starring in a total of 44 French, British, German, and Italian films.

In France he frequently played the part of Asian villains. His most active period was in the thirties, when he appeared in Les Bateliers de la Volga and the G. W. Pabst film Le drame de Shanghai. He played for Fritz Lang in 1959, in Der Tiger von Eschnapur and its sequel Das indische Grabmal, in which he played the role of the high priest Yama. In 1965, Philippe de Broca cast him as Monsieur Goh, the wise but scary Chinese who guarantees to the Jean-Paul Belmondo character a certain death in Les tribulations d'un Chinois en Chine.

His last movie was with Brigitte Bardot and Claudia Cardinale, where he played the role of a Native American chieftain in Les pétroleuses.

== Personal life ==
He was a great friend of Charles Dullin and Louis Jouvet, and had a long career in French theater, appearing for instance in Marie Galante by Jacques Deval.

=== Death ===
Inkijinoff died at his home in Brunoy, Essonne, France, aged 78. He is buried at Sainte-Geneviève-des-Bois Russian Cemetery

== Filmography ==
=== Film ===
Year	Title	Role	Notes
1917	Silnyi chelovek		
1925	Pasplata		As director; lost film
1926	Rasplata		Lost film
1927	Vor		As director; lost film
1928	Storm Over Asia	Bair	
1929	Kometa		As director; lost film
1930	Le capitaine jaune	Mongol Maitre d'Hotel	
1933	The Battle	Hirata	
1933	A Man's Neck	Radek	
1933	Typhoon	Dr. Nitobe Tokeramo	
1934	Amok	Amok / Maté	
1934	Volga in Flames	Silatschoff	
1935	Frisians in Peril	Kommissar Tschernoff	
1936	The Last Four on Santa Cruz	Reeder Alexis Aika	
1936	The Volga Boatman	Kiro	
1937	The Wife of General Ling	General Ling / Mr. Wong	
1938	Street Without Joy	Louis Stinner	
1938	The Shanghai Drama	Lee Pang	
1938	Rail Pirates	Wang	
1948	The Renegade	Moktar	
1949	Maya	Cachemire	
1950	The Black Rose	Chinese Minister	Uncredited
1954	Mata Hari's Daughter	Naos	
1955	Verrat an Deutschland	Hotsumi Ozaki	
1956	Beloved Corinna	Chin	
1956	Michel Strogoff	Feofar Khan	
1958	The Doctor of Stalingrad	Lt. Colonel Worotilow	
1959	The Tiger of Eschnapur	Yama	
1959	The Indian Tomb	Yama	
1960	Mistress of the World	Priest	
1961	The Triumph of Michael Strogoff	Amektal	
1961	Samson and the Seven Miracles of the World	Taoist High Priest	
1962	Mon oncle du Texas	Big Nose	
1964	The Secret of Dr. Mabuse	Dr. Krishna	
1964	Nick Carter va tout casser	Li-Hang	
1965	Up to His Ears	Mr. Goh	
1966	Atout cœur à Tokyo pour OSS 117	Yekota	
1967	The Blonde from Peking	Fang Ho Kung	
1967	The Last Adventure	Kyobaski	
1971	The Legend of Frenchie King	Spitting Bull	

=== Television ===
Year	Title	Role	Notes
1966	Il faut que je tue Monsieur Rumann	Mr. Rumann	TV movie
1967-68	The Aeronauts	Mr. X / Le Képala	17 episodes
1971	Tang	Tang	13 episodes
1972	Le Fils du ciel	Minh	26 episodes
