= Rocket to the Moon =

Rocket to the Moon may refer to:

- The Rocket to the Moon (novel), a 1928 novel by Thea von Harbou
- Rocket to the Moon (play), 1938 play by Clifford Odets
- Rocket to the Moon (ride), ride at Disneyland
- Jules Verne's Rocket to the Moon, 1967 British science fiction film
- A Rocket to the Moon, an American rock band from Braintree, Massachusetts
- Rocket to the Moon (1955 film), a Disney live-action short
- "Rocket to the Moon", a song by Chris Kenner

== See also ==
- Exploration of the Moon, physical exploration of Earth's natural satellite
- Mission to the Moon
- Moon rocket
