= The Indian Tomb (1959 film) =

1959 adventure film by Fritz Lang

- German theatrical release poster
- Directed by: Fritz Lang
- Screenplay by: Thea von Harbou; Fritz Lang; Werner Jörg Lüddecke
- Based on: The Indian Tomb by Thea von Harbou
- Produced by: Artur Brauner
- Starring: Debra Paget; Paul Hubschmid; Walter Reyer; Claus Holm; Valéry Inkijinoff; Sabine Bethmann
- Cinematography: Richard Angst
- Edited by: Walter Wischniewsky
- Music by: Gerhard Becker; Michel Michelet
- Production companies: Central Cinema Company; Rizzoli Film; Regina Production; Critérion Film
- Release date: March 5, 1959 (West Germany)
- Running time: 102 minutes
- Countries: West Germany; France; Italy
- Language: German

The Indian Tomb (German: Das indische Grabmal) is a 1959 adventure film, co-written and directed by Fritz Lang. Produced by Artur Brauner, it is an international co-production of West Germany, France and Italy. It is the second film, after The Tiger of Eschnapur (1959), of "Fritz Lang's Indian Epic" duology, which are based on the 1918 novel The Indian Tomb, written by Lang's ex-wife Thea von Harbou.

The Indian Tomb stars Debra Paget, Paul Hubschmid, Walter Reyer, Claus Holm, Valéry Inkijinoff, and Sabine Bethmann. Interiors were shot at the Spandau Studios in West Berlin with sets designed by the art directors Helmut Nentwig and Willy Schatz.

In 1960 American International Pictures obtained the rights to both films in "Fritz Lang's Indian Epic", combining them into one heavily edited, 90-minute-long feature named Journey to the Lost City which earned domestic gross of $500,000. After both were dubbed into Spanish, they were shown as separate films, where the second is a direct continuation of the first.

== Plot ==
The Indian Tomb picks up directly after the cliffhanger ending of The Tiger of Eschnapur.

Architect Harald Berger and Princess Seetha are fleeing the wrath of the jealous Maharaja Chandra, who has discovered their love. Pursued across deserts and jungles by the Maharaja’s soldiers, the lovers face treacherous landscapes, wild animals, and a web of betrayals. Meanwhile, Harald’s sister Irene and her husband Walter, still guests of Chandra, begin to suspect the Maharaja’s darker intentions, as his obsession with Seetha pushes him toward cruelty and vengeance.

The story culminates in the construction of the Maharaja’s intended monument: a grand tomb for Seetha—meant not as an honor but as her eternal prison in death. As political unrest brews and a rebellion stirs among Chandra’s subjects, loyalties shift and danger mounts. In the final act, love, jealousy, and imperial grandeur collide in a spectacle of dance, swordplay, and opulent settings, leading to a resolution that restores order but leaves the grandeur of Chandra’s ambitions crumbling in the dust.

== Reception ==
On the review aggregator website Rotten Tomatoes, the film had an approval rating of 88% based on 8 reviews. Contemporaneously Die Welt wrote: "Here lies Fritz Lang, once creator of important films like Metropolis and M. The 'Indian tomb' is his own" [i.e., grave as a filmmaker]. In contrast to the film's early reception, later American film critics have assessed the film much more positively.

=== Snake dance scene ===
The film is probably best remembered today for Debra Paget's "snake dance scene". The Hollywood Reporter headlined their 2019 review of the film with a publicity shot of her dance, writing, "The pasted-on costume she wears for a long 'snake dance' scene, which leaves her nearly naked, seems to do the trick—though Seetha's wardrobe will hardly distract 21st century viewers from perhaps the fakest-looking writhing cobra in movie history."

== See also ==
- The Indian Tomb (1921 film)
- The Indian Tomb (1938 film)
