= The Tiger of Eschnapur (1959 film) =

1959 film by Fritz Lang

- German theatrical release poster
- Directed by: Fritz Lang
- Screenplay by: Fritz Lang; Werner Jörg Lüddecke; Thea von Harbou
- Based on: The Indian Tomb by Thea von Harbou
- Produced by: Artur Brauner
- Starring: Debra Paget; Paul Hubschmid; Walter Reyer
- Cinematography: Richard Angst
- Edited by: Walter Wischniewsky
- Music by: Michel Michelet
- Distributed by: Fantoma; Omnia-Film; Polyband GmbH
- Release date: 22 January 1959
- Running time: 101 minutes
- Countries: West Germany; France; Italy
- Language: German

The Tiger of Eschnapur (German: Der Tiger von Eschnapur) is a 1959 adventure film directed by Fritz Lang. It is the first of two films comprising what has come to be known as Fritz Lang's Indian Epic, the other is The Indian Tomb (1959). Lang returned to Germany to direct these films, which together tell the story of a German architect, the Indian maharaja for whom he is supposed to build schools and hospitals, and the dancer who comes between them.

== Plot ==
Architect Harold Berger travels to India, hired by Maharajah Chandra to build schools and hospitals. While traveling to see the Maharajah, Berger meets Seetha, a temple dancer who has also been invited to the palace. En route, he saves her life when her caravan is attacked by a man-eating tiger.

The two quickly begin to fall in love. During one of their conversations, Seetha plays a song she remembers her father singing. Berger recognizes it as an old Irish song. Because of this memory and the features of her face, he deduces her father might be European. Seetha barely remembers her father, as he left her when she was very little, but suspects this to be true. Regardless of this, she still feels like an Indian woman at heart.

While surveying the palace's foundations for repairs, Berger discovers a series of tunnels. These lead to a cavern, where he sees people afflicted with leprosy kept in inhumane conditions. This discovery makes him rethink Chandra's apparent kindness. Berger also finds a secret tunnel that leads to the temple where Seetha is dancing for a religious ceremony.

Seeing Seetha's dance, the Maharajah becomes infatuated with her. Chandra's wife died years before, and he now plans to marry Seetha. He treats the dancer with kindness, hoping to gain her affection. However, Seetha only has eyes for the architect. While not being forced to be Chandra's wife, Seetha believes that it is not wise to refuse the ruler's desires. Her sense of duty to him is exacerbated when he saves her from being sexually assaulted by a group rebelling against the Maharajah, led by the brother of his late wife. This causes tension between Chandra and Berger. Meanwhile, scheming courtiers, including the Maharajah's older brother, believe that Chandra's potential marriage to the dancer could become a pretext for toppling his reign.

Using the secret tunnel, Berger escapes with Seetha into the desert, just before his sister and her husband, an architect who works with him, arrive in Eschnapur. Chandra informs them that he now wants a tomb to be built before any further work can begin on the previously commissioned buildings. After discovering that Seetha and Berger have fled, Chandra issues a command for Berger to be killed, and Seetha returned alive for burial in the tomb after its completion. After their horses die, the couple is stranded in the desert as a sandstorm begins.

(The story continues in the sequel film, The Indian Tomb.)

== Cast ==
- Debra Paget as Seetha
- Paul Hubschmid as Harold Berger
- Walter Reyer as Chandra
- Claus Holm as Dr. Walter Rhode
- Luciana Paluzzi as Baharani
- Valéry Inkijinoff as Yama
- Sabine Bethmann as Irene Rhode
- René Deltgen as Prince Ramigani
- Jochen Brockmann as Padhu
- Richard Lauffen as Browana
- Jochen Blume as Asagara
- Helmut Hildebrand as Ramigani's servant
- Guido Celano as General Dagh (uncredited)
- Victor Francen as penitent (uncredited)
- Panos Papadopulos as courier (uncredited)
- Angela Portaluri as peasant woman (uncredited)

== Production ==
The film was shot on location in India with a predominantly German cast. Lang was able to get permission from the Maharana of Udaipur to shoot at many locations that were normally barred to Western film crews. One of these was the floating Lake Palace seen much later in Octopussy.

Interiors were shot at the Spandau Studios in Berlin with sets designed by the art directors Helmut Nentwig and Willy Schatz.

== Prior works ==
Lang's Indian epic is based on work he did forty years earlier on a silent version of Das Indische Grabmal. He and Thea von Harbou co-wrote the screenplay, basing it on von Harbou's novel of the same name. Lang was set to direct, but that job was taken from him and given to Joe May. Lang did not control the final form of that earlier version which was a commercial and critical failure at the time, although its reputation has grown in recent years.

Released in 1921, the original version of Das Indische Grabmal had a running time of 3 1/2 hours and was released in two parts. For the remake, Lang also divided the story into two parts that each run about 100 minutes.

== Releases ==
The two films were edited down into one 95-minute feature courtesy of American International Pictures and released in the US in 1959 as Journey to the Lost City—with Seetha's dance scenes heavily trimmed, courtesy of the Hays Office. The negatives of Fritz Lang's original films were thought to be lost, but a set was rediscovered. Fantoma Films restored them in the DVD format, producing one disc for each film. The discs contain both German and English dialogue tracks, plus other extras. They were released by Image Entertainment in 2001.

== See also ==
- Another film titled Der Tiger von Eschnapur was released in Germany in 1938. It too was based on Thea von Harbou's novel The Indian Tomb. The film was directed by Richard Eichberg and written by him along with Hans Klaehr and Arthur Pohl.
