= The Tiger of Eschnapur (1938 film) =

1938 film directed by Richard Eichberg

- Film poster
- Directed by: Richard Eichberg
- Written by: Thea von Harbou (novel The Indian Tomb); Richard Eichberg (writer); Hans Klaehr (writer); Arthur Pohl (writer)
- Produced by: Richard Eichberg (producer); Herbert Engelsing (line producer)
- Starring: See below
- Cinematography: Ewald Daub; W. Meyer-Bergelt; Hans Schneeberger; Hugo O. Schulze
- Edited by: Willy Zeyn
- Music by: Harald Böhmelt
- Release date: 1938
- Running time: 96 minutes
- Country: Germany
- Language: German

The Tiger of Eschnapur (originally Der Tiger von Eschnapur) is a 1938 German film directed by Richard Eichberg and starring Philip Dorn, La Jana and Theo Lingen. It was followed by a second part The Indian Tomb which was released the same year.

It is a remake of part of The Indian Tomb (1921 film) and was remade again as The Tiger of Eschnapur (1959 film).

== Plot ==
A German architect falls in love with a temple dancer.

== Cast ==
- Philip Dorn as Maharadscha von Eschnapur
- La Jana as Maharani von Eschnapur
- Alexander Golling as Prinz Ramigani, Vetter des Maharadscha
- Theo Lingen as Emil Sperling
- Kitty Jantzen as Irene Traven
- Gustav Diessl as Sascha Demidoff, Abenteurer
- Hans Stüwe as Peter Fürbringer, Architekt
- Karl Haubenreißer as Gopal
- Albert Hörrmann as Ragupati, in Diensten Ramiganis
- Rosa Jung as Myrrha, Vertraute der Maharani
- S.O. Schoening as Leibarzt Dr. Putri
- Gisela Schlüter as Lotte Sperling
- Hans Zesch-Ballot as Fjedor Borodin, Abenteurer
- Harry Frank as Mischa Borodin, Abenteurer
- Gerhard Dammann as Neugieriger Gast auf Fürbringers Fest
- Hertha von Walther as Gast auf Fürbringers Fest
- Carl Auen as Indischer Nobiler
- Jutta Jol as Mädchen bei Irene Traven
- Theo Shall as Direktor des Crystal Palace
- Charles Willy Kayser as Direktor des Crystal Palace
- Josef Peterhans as Indischer Nobiler
- Paul Rehkopf as Indischer Nobiler
