= Ayi Tendulkar =

Indian screenwriter (1904–1975)

- Ayi Tendulkar
- Born: Ayi Ganpat Tendulkar; 1 January 1904; Belgundi, India
- Died: 1 January 1975 (aged 71); India
- Occupations: Filmmaker, actor, author
- Years active: 1933–1954
- Spouse(s): Sasha Alexandra Passini (1924–19??); Eva Gräfin Finck von Finckenstein (19??–19??); Thea von Harbou (c.1933–19??); Indumati Gunaji (19??–19??)

Ayi Ganpat Tendulkar (1904–1975) was an Indian screenwriter, journalist and actor. He is especially known as the husband of Thea von Harbou, the writer of the science fiction film classic Metropolis.

== Education and marriages ==
Tendulkar received the Toppiwala scholarship, which allowed him to gain admission into a British university, but he was not quite ready to begin his studies. As a result, he decided to study French at the École Normale Superieure, in Paris.

Tendulkar's first wife was Sasha Alexandra Passini, a Russian whom he met in Paris in 1924. After they separated, Passini married an Italian man.

Tendulkar then married German actress Eva Schubring, the daughter of one of his professors. Their marriage ended once Tendulkar began a romantic relationship with author and filmmaker Thea von Harbou in 1933, who was married to Fritz Lang. Their relationship was part of the motivation for von Harbou's divorce from Lang.

Tendulkar's fourth wife was Indumati Gunaji. When World War II broke out, Tendulkar was forced to leave Germany, and he returned to India, where he met Gunaji while getting involved in Gandhi's campaign against British rule. Gandhi himself became involved in their relationship, stipulating they could not marry before waiting five years and not having children before India gained independence. Their daughter, Laxmi Tendulkar Dhaul, wrote a book about her parents and von Harbou.
