= Eva Gräfin Finck von Finckenstein =

German politician (1903–1994)

Eva Gräfin Finck von Finckenstein (née Schubring; 3 December 1903, in Berlin – 13 March 1994) was a German politician, representative of the German Christian Democratic Union.

Eva Schubring was born in Berlin to the art historian Professor Schubring. She visited school in Berlin and studied national economics at the University of Berlin. In 1928-33 she was the managing editor for foreign affairs of the Vossische Zeitung in Berlin. After the Nazis took over power in Germany she retreated from politics.

She was first married to screenwriter Ayi Tendulkar and after her divorce she married Gottfried Graf Finck von Finckenstein in 1934, with whom she had five children. After her marriage she lived in Terpen in East Prussia. At the end of World War II she fled to Schleswig-Holstein, where she published a journal "Die Hausfrau" (The housewife) in 1949/50. In 1950 she joined the League of Expellees and Deprived of Rights (BHE) and became the personal assistant of BHE Chairman Waldemar Kraft and the party's press referent. In 1953 she was elected a member of the German Bundestag.

In 1954 she was not reelected into the BHE board, which led to the resignation of Waldemar Kraft as BHE Chairman. In 1956 Kraft, Finckenstein and Theodor Oberländer joined the CDU Fraction, which led to the decline of influence of the BHE in German politics.

Finck von Finckenstein was not again elected to the Bundestag and retreated from politics.

== See also ==
- List of German Christian Democratic Union politicians
