= Helmut Nentwig =

German art director (1916–2007)

- Born: 21 January 1916; Breslau, Silesia, German Empire
- Died: 29 December 2007 (aged 91); Baden-Württemberg, Germany
- Occupation: Art director
- Years active: 1954-1978 (film & TV)

Helmut Nentwig (1916–2007) was a German art director.

== Selected filmography ==
- You Can No Longer Remain Silent (1955)
- Bonjour Kathrin (1956)
- The Simple Girl (1957)
- The Big Chance (1957)
- Munchhausen in Africa (1958)
- Escape from Sahara (1958)
- Confess, Dr. Corda (1958)
- The Csardas King (1958)
- And That on Monday Morning (1959)
- The Tiger of Eschnapur (1959)
- The Indian Tomb (1959)
- Here I Am, Here I Stay (1959)
- Mistress of the World (1960)
- Grounds for Divorce (1960)
- The Strange Countess (1961)
- Only a Woman (1962)
- The Terror of Doctor Mabuse (1962)

== Bibliography ==
- Bergfelder, Tim. International Adventures: German Popular Cinema and European Co-Productions in the 1960s. Berghahn Books, 2005.
