= Mekanique =

Publication information
- Publisher: DC Comics
- First appearance: Infinity, Inc. #19 (June 1985)
- Created by: Roy Thomas, Dann Thomas, Todd McFarlane

In-story information
- Full name: Mekanique
- Place of origin: Earth
- Abilities: Time travel

Mekanique is a supervillainess in the fictional DC Universe. She first appeared in Infinity, Inc. #19 (June 1985).

== Publication history ==
Mekanique and the futuristic setting she originates from are based on the film Metropolis, with Mekanique being based on the Maschinenmensch. For copyright reasons, Roy Thomas gave her a unique name rather than have characters refer to her as Maschinenmensch.

== Fictional character biography ==
In All-Star Squadron #58, Mekanique appears suddenly in the headquarters of the All-Star Squadron; she is badly damaged and attacks Firebrand. Before she can be destroyed by Green Lantern, Robotman steps in and offers to repair her. A subsequent power surge threatens to destroy the headquarters, but instead restores Mekanique. She reveals that she is from the far future, and had returned to the past to prevent a horrible future war. Mekanique shows the heroes an image of a child about to be killed in a car accident, and they save her, thus changing the future.

Afterwards, Mekanique reveals to Robotman her true origin. She is from the future, but was created by an evil scientist named Rotwang. In her time, a small elite ruled despotically over a downtrodden slave race. The elite were in danger of being overthrown due to a woman named Maria, who led the slaves into open rebellion. Mekanique had been given the power not only to travel in time, which would allow her to change the timeline. Mekanique erases Robotman's memory so that he cannot warn his fellow Squadron members.

In 1942, Mekanique meets Per Degaton while he is still an assistant at the Time Trust. She convinces Degaton to help her in her fight against the All-Star Squadron, in exchange for teaching him the secrets of time travel. Their attack fails, and Mekanique's body is destroyed. Degaton escapes with her head, and keeps it with him for the next five years. By 1947, Degaton, Mekanique, and Malachi Zee build a working time machine. Degaton, who wants the machine for himself, shoots Zee, who falls into the machine and accidentally sends it forty years into the future. When Mekanique suggests they wait forty years for the machine to reappear, Degaton snaps and buries Mekanique's head.

Forty years later, Degaton reconstructs Mekanique. The two of them attack Infinity, Inc. at the scheduled return site of the time machine. When the time machine appears, it contains not only the body of Zee, but a younger Degaton. This duplicate version of Degaton had been created by the chronal energies of the time machine as Degaton lunged at the machine in 1947. However, the duplicate Per Degaton disintegrates due to the effects of a time paradox. Fearing that Degaton will destroy her again, Mekanique kills him, and then destroys herself.
