= Woman in the Moon =

1929 film directed by Fritz Lang

- Theatrical release poster
- Directed by: Fritz Lang
- Screenplay by: Thea von Harbou
- Based on: The Rocket to the Moon; 1928 novel by Thea von Harbou
- Produced by: Fritz Lang
- Starring: Willy Fritsch; Gerda Maurus; Klaus Pohl; Fritz Rasp; Gustl Gstettenbaur; Gustav von Wangenheim
- Cinematography: Curt Courant
- Music by: Willy Schmidt-Gentner
- Distributed by: UFA
- Release date: 15 October 1929
- Running time: 169 min. (2000 restoration) / Spain: 104 min. / Spain: 162 min. (DVD edition) / US: 95 min / West Germany: 91 min (edited version) (1970)
- Countries: Germany (Weimar Republic)
- Languages: Silent film German intertitles

Woman in the Moon (German: Frau im Mond) is a German science fiction silent film that premiered 15 October 1929 at the UFA-Palast am Zoo cinema in Berlin to an audience of 2,000. It is often considered to be one of the first "serious" science fiction films. It was directed by Fritz Lang, and written by his wife Thea von Harbou, based on her 1928 novel The Rocket to the Moon. It was released in the US as By Rocket to the Moon and in the UK as Girl in the Moon. The basics of rocket travel were presented to a mass audience for the first time by this film, including the use of a multi-stage rocket. The film was shot between October 1928 and June 1929 at the UFA studios in Neubabelsberg near Berlin.

== Plot ==
Woman in the Moon (1929)

Helius is an entrepreneur with an interest in space travel. He seeks out his friend Professor Manfeldt, a visionary who earlier wrote a treatise claiming that there was probably much gold on the Moon, only to be ridiculed by his peers. Helius recognizes the value of Manfeldt's work. However, a gang of evil businessmen have also taken an interest in Manfeldt's theories, and send a spy who identifies himself as "Walter Turner".

Meanwhile, Helius' assistant Windegger has announced his engagement to Helius's other assistant, Friede Velten. Helius, who secretly loves Friede, avoids their engagement party.

On his way home from his meeting with Professor Manfeldt, Helius is enticed by a henchwoman of the gang posing as a violet seller. The research that Professor Manfeldt had entrusted to Helius is stolen, and they also burgle Helius' home, taking other valuable material. Turner then presents Helius with an ultimatum: the gang knows he is planning a voyage to the Moon; either he includes them in the project, or they will sabotage it and destroy his rocket, which is named Friede ("peace", and also Helius' assistant's first name). Reluctantly, Helius agrees to their terms.

The rocket team is assembled: Helius; Professor Manfeldt and his pet mouse Josephine; Windegger; Friede; and Turner. After Friede blasts off, the team discovers that Gustav, a young boy who has befriended Helius, has stowed away, along with his collection of science fiction pulp magazines. During the journey, Windegger emerges as a coward, and Helius's feelings for Friede begin to become known to her, creating a romantic triangle.

They reach the far side of the Moon and find it has a breathable atmosphere, per the theories of Peter Andreas Hansen, who is mentioned near the beginning of the film. Manfeldt discovers gold, proving his theory. When confronted by Turner, Manfeldt falls to his death in a crevasse. Turner, with samples of the gold, attempts to hijack the rocket, and in the struggle, he is shot and killed. Gunfire damages the oxygen tanks, and they come to the grim realization that there is not enough oxygen for all to make the return trip. One person must remain on the Moon.

Helius and Windegger draw straws to see who must stay and Windegger loses. Seeing Windegger's anguish, Helius decides to drug Windegger and Friede with a last drink together and take Windegger's place, letting Windegger return to Earth with Friede. Friede senses that something is in the wine. She pretends to drink and then retires to the compartment where her cot is located, closes and locks the door. Windegger drinks the wine, becoming sedated. Helius makes Gustav his confidant and the new pilot for the ship. Helius watches it depart, then starts out for the survival camp originally prepared for Windegger. He discovers that Friede has decided to stay with him on the Moon. They embrace, and Helius weeps into her shoulder while Friede strokes his hair and whispers words of comfort to him.

== Cast ==
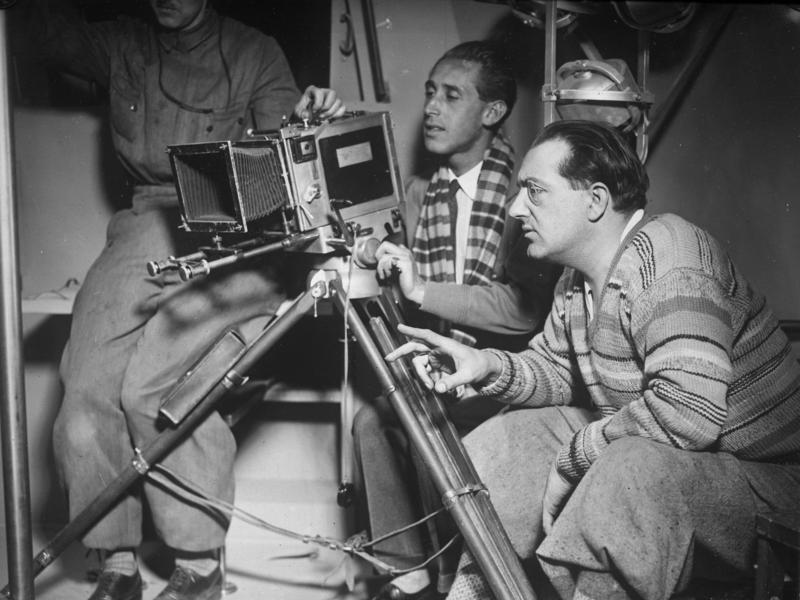
Director Fritz Lang (on the right), on the set of Woman in the Moon, 1929

- Klaus Pohl as Professor Georg Manfeldt
- Willy Fritsch as Wolf Helius
- Gustav von Wangenheim as Ingenieur Hans Windegger (as Gustav v. Wangenheim)
- Gerda Maurus as Stud. astr. Friede Velten
- Gustl Gstettenbaur as Gustav (as Gustl Stark-Gstettenbaur)
- Fritz Rasp as "the man who calls himself Walter Turner"
- Fünf Gehirne und Scheckbücher ("Five brains and checkbooks"):
  - Tilla Durieux
  - Hermann Vallentin
  - Max Zilzer
  - Mahmud Terja Bey
  - Borwin Walth
- Karl Platen as Der Mann am Mikrophon
- Margarete Kupfer as Frau Hippolt, Haushälterin bei Helius
- Alexa von Porembsky as Eine Veilchenverkäuferin (as Alexa v. Porembska)
- Gerhard Dammann as Der Werkmeister der Helius-Flugwerften (as Dammann)
- Heinrich Gotho as Der Mieter vom II. Stock (as Gotho)
- Zwei eindeutige Existenzen ("Two unambiguous characters"):
  - Alfred Loretto (as Loretto)
  - Edgar Pauly (as Pauly)
- Max Maximilian as Grotjan, Chauffeur bei Helius (as Maximilian)

== Influence ==
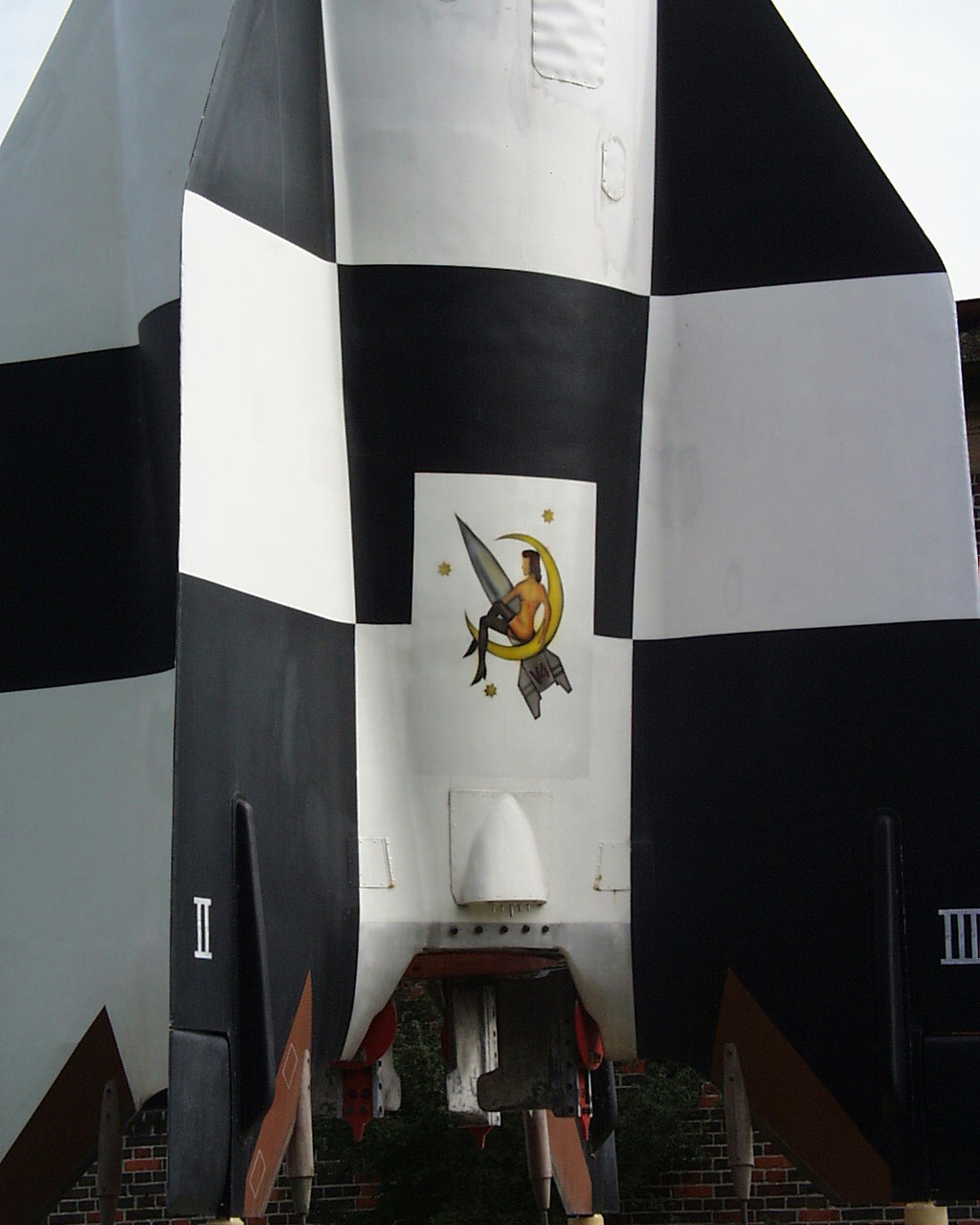
V-2 rocket with "Woman in the Moon" nose art referencing the movie

Lang, who also made Metropolis, had a personal interest in science fiction. When returning to Germany in the late 1950s, he sold his extensive collection of Astounding Science Fiction, Weird Tales, and Galaxy magazines. Several prescient technical/operational features are presented during the film's 1920s launch sequence, which subsequently came into common operational use during America's postwar space race:

- The rocket ship Friede is fully built in a tall building and moved on rails to the launch area
- As launch approaches, intertitles count down the seconds from six to "now" ("now" was used for zero), and Woman in the Moon is often cited as the first occurrence of the "countdown to zero" before a rocket launch
- The rocket ship blasts off submerged in a pool of water; water is commonly used today on launch pads to absorb and dissipate the extreme heat and to dampen the noise generated by the rocket exhaust
- In space, the rocket ejects its first stage and fires its second stage rocket, predicting the development of modern multistage orbital rockets
- The crew recline on horizontal beds to cope with the G-forces experienced during lift-off and pre-orbital acceleration
- Floor foot straps are used to restrain the crew during zero gravity (Velcro is used today).

These items and the overall design of the rocket led to the film being banned in Germany from 1933–1945 during World War II by the Nazis, due to similarities to their secret V-2 project.

Rocket scientist Hermann Oberth worked as an advisor on this movie. He had originally intended to build a working rocket for use in the film, but time and technical constraints prevented this from happening. The film was popular among the rocket scientists in Wernher von Braun's circle at the Verein für Raumschiffahrt (VfR). The first successfully launched V-2 rocket at the rocket-development facility in Peenemünde had the Frau im Mond logo painted on its base. Noted post-war science writer Willy Ley also served as a consultant on the film. Thomas Pynchon's 1973 novel Gravity's Rainbow, which deals with the V-2 rockets, refers to the movie, along with several other classic German silent films. Oberth also advised Hergé for Destination Moon and Explorers on the Moon, which has plot points strongly influenced by Woman in the Moon.

== See also ==
- 1929 in science fiction
