= Bettina Riddle von Hutten =

American-born novelist

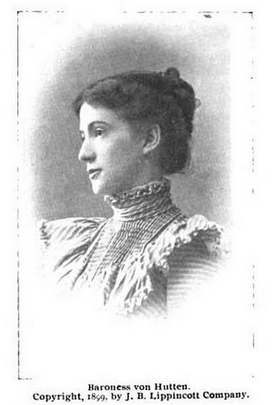
Bettina Riddle, Baroness von Hutten zum Stolzenberg, in an 1899 publication

Bettina Riddle (February 14, 1874 – January 26, 1957), also known as Betsey Riddle, and later as Baroness von Hutten, was an American-born novelist, specializing in historical fiction. As an American in England during World War I, she was arrested and fined as an enemy alien, because she had a German ex-husband.

== Early life and family ==
Elizabeth Riddle was born in Erie, Pennsylvania, the daughter of John Simms Riddle, a lawyer and state legislator, and Kate Howard Riddle. Her grandfather was Congressman William Alanson Howard, and her brother was a medical writer, Hugh Howard Riddle. Bettina's grandmother Mary Dickinson Riddle was a cousin of artist Mary Cassatt. Among her uncles were ambassadors Thomas A. Scott and Thomas J. O'Brien.

She called herself "Pam" for a time, after the most popular of her fiction-characters, and kept a pet monkey like the fictional Pam. In 1910 she tried acting.

== Personal life ==
She married Friedrich Karl August, the Baron von Hutten zum Stolzenberg, in 1897, in Florence. They had two children, Karl (1898-1971) and Katharina (1902-1975). They divorced "by mutual consent" in 1909, amidst rumors of her infatuation with Italian tenor Francesco Guardabassi.

She soon had two more children with actor Henry Ainley, actor Richard Ainley (1910-1967) and Henrietta Riddle (b. 1913). Henrietta was briefly engaged to Alistair Cooke in 1932.

Bettina von Hutten lived in England but wintered in Rome. During World War I she lived under travel restrictions as an "enemy alien" in England, because of her German ex-husband. She was arrested and fined for breaking these restrictions. In 1921 she was badly injured in a car accident near Danzig; in 1925, she was in bankruptcy. She regained her American citizenship in 1938, and lived in California during World War II. She converted to Roman Catholicism late in life, and died in 1957, in London, aged 83 years.

Her granddaughter Katrine von Hutten (1944-2013) was a German writer and translator.

== Career ==
Novels by Betsey Riddle include:

- Miss Carmichael's Conscience (1898)
- Marr'd in Making (1900)
- Our Lady of the Beeches (1902)
- Violett (1904)
- Araby (1904)
- Pam (1905)
- Pam Decides (1906)
- What Became of Pam (1906)
- The One Way Out (1906)
- He and Hecuba (1906)
- Kingsmead, a Novel (1909)
- The Halo (1911)
- Beechy: or, The Lordship of Love (1909)
- The Green Patch (1911)
- Sharrow (1912)
- Maria (1914)
- Helping Hersey (1914)
- Bird's Fountain (1915)
- Mag Pye (1917)
- The Bag of Saffron (1918)
- Happy House (1919)
- Mother-in-Law (1922)
- Mice for Amusement: A Novel (1934)
- Lives of a Woman (1935, adapted for the stage as There Was an Old Woman in 1938)
- Die She Must (1936)
- Youth Without Glory (1938)
- What Happened is This (1939).

Further:

- Julia
- Candy, and Other Stories
- Flies
- Eddy and Édouard
- The Curate's Egg.
