= Metropolis (novel) =

1926 German-language book by Thea von Harbou

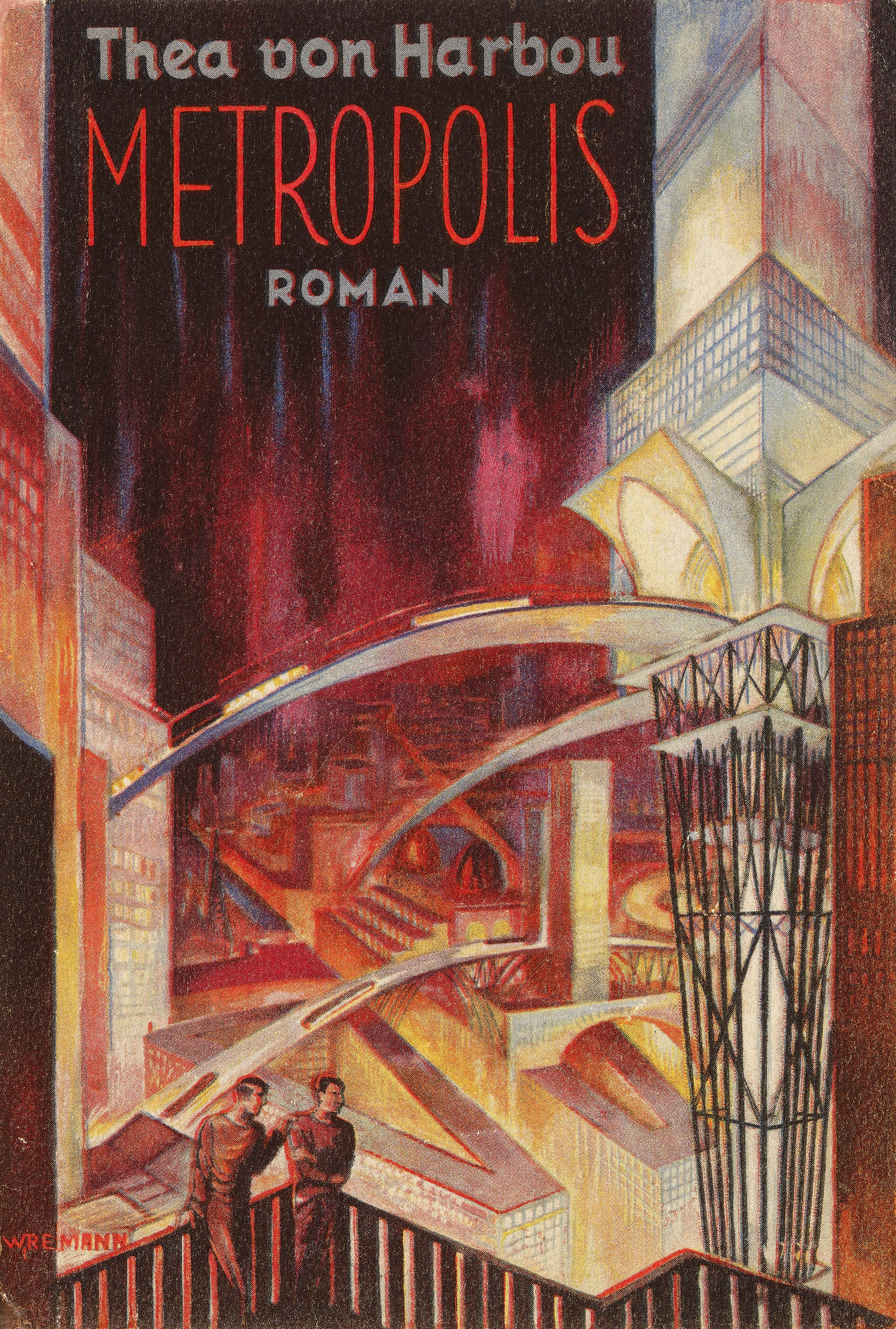
- First edition cover
- Author: Thea von Harbou
- Language: German
- Publisher: Illustriertes Blatt; August Scherl
- Publication date: 1926
- Publication place: Germany
- English publication date: 1927
- Pages: 273

Metropolis is a 1926 science fiction novel by the German writer Thea von Harbou. The novel was a treatment for Fritz Lang's 1927 film Metropolis, on which von Harbou and Lang collaborated in 1924.

== Premise ==
The story is set in a technologically advanced city, which is sustained by the existence of an exploited class of labourers who live underground, far away from the gleaming surface world. Freder, the son and heir of Joh Fredersen, one of the city's founders, falls in love with Maria, a girl from the underground. Their romance takes place against the growing threat of civil war between the labourers and the armies of the founders, and the question of whether a lasting peace can be found.

== Publication ==
The novel was serialised in the magazine Illustriertes Blatt from August to December 1926, accompanied by stills from the upcoming film adaptation. It was published in book form in the same year by August Scherl. An English translation was published in February 1927 by Readers Library.

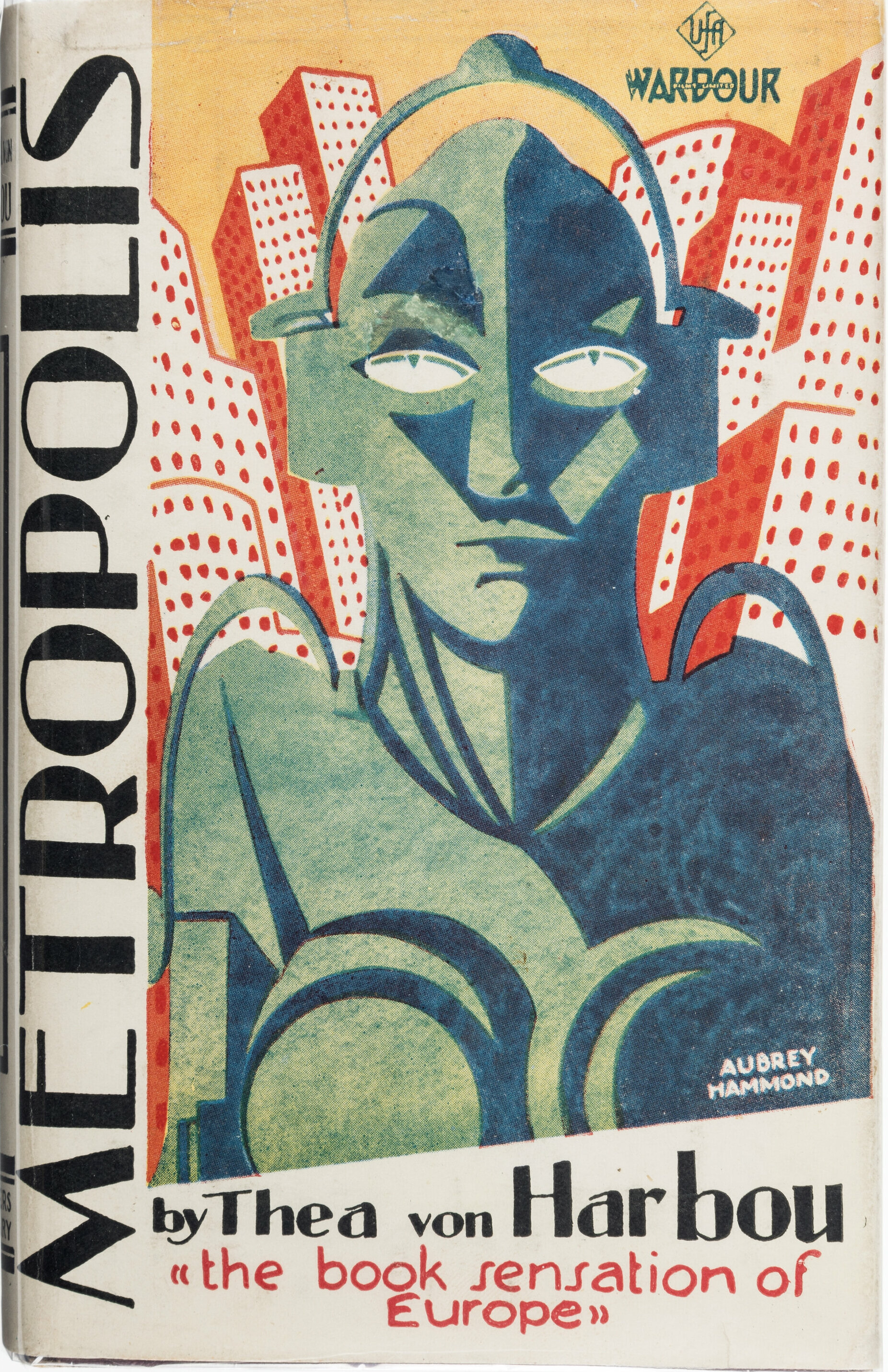
Cover of the first edition of the English translation (art by Aubrey Hammond)

== Reception ==
Michael Joseph of The Bookman wrote about the novel: "It is a remarkable piece of work, skilfully reproducing the atmosphere one has come to associate with the most ambitious German film productions. Suggestive in many respects of the dramatic work of Karel Capek and of the earlier fantastic romances of H. G. Wells, in treatment it is an interesting example of expressionist literature. [...] Metropolis is one of the most powerful novels I have read and one which may capture a large public both in America and England if it does not prove too bewildering to the plain reader."

== Film adaptation ==
The film Metropolis, as reconstructed in 2010

The book was written with the intention of being adapted for film by Harbou's husband, the director Fritz Lang. Harbou collaborated with Lang on the script for the film, also titled Metropolis. Shooting began before the novel was published. The film omits certain parts of the book, especially references to the occult (of which a small hint exists in the film). Other parts of the story in the book disappeared from the film after drastic cuts made by the studio and distributors after the film's initial release. Some of these cuts have been rediscovered, while others remain lost. Also missing from the film are explications of the moral motivations for certain actions of the main characters.

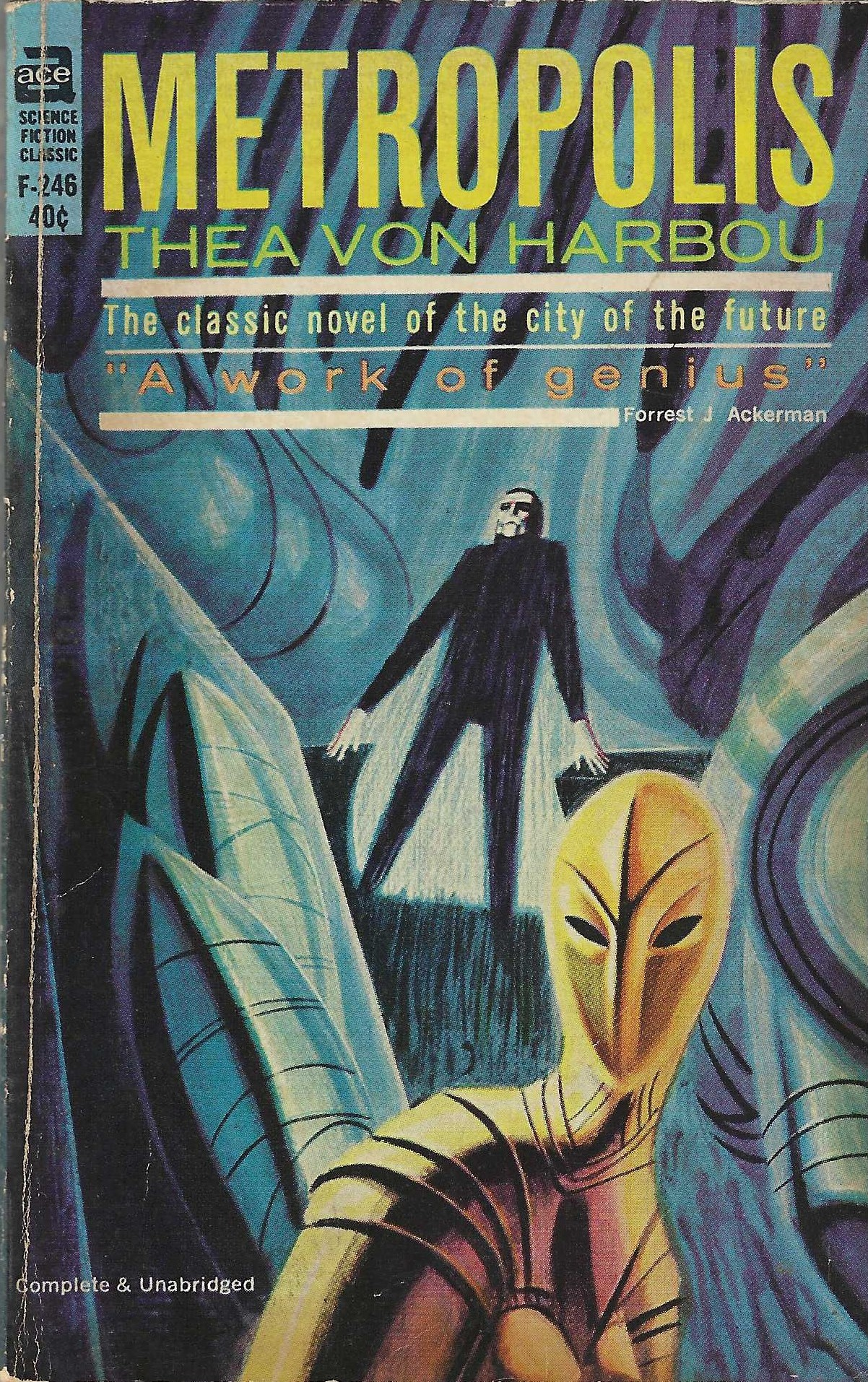
Cover of the Ace Science Fiction 1963 edition of the English translation (art by Jack Gaughan)

== Synopsis ==
=== Chapter I ===
Freder broods in his “work-shop” playing the organ and having visions of the heavens and of a woman he does not know. He dismisses all of his servants, including Slim, who is both servant and keeper.

“Club of the Sons” is a massive complex, featuring theaters, libraries, lecture rooms, and a stadium. Luxuriating in the Eternal Gardens, and about to seduce a young servant, they are interrupted by the entrance of a crowd of emaciated children in rags, led by Maria, whose appearance overwhelms Freder. She tells the children, and all those present, that they are all brothers, before she is led away. Freder becomes obsessed.

In his work-room, Freder speaks to a machine he is making that he would give up everything for this woman he has seen. He hears the signal for the shift change, which is activated every ten hours by his father, Joh Frederson, Master of Metropolis, positioned in the Brain-pan, high up in the New Tower of Babel. Joh Frederson activates the city through his exclusive use of the blue plate. Freder goes to see his father.

=== Chapter II ===
Joh Frederson, Master of Metropolis, stands in the Brain-pan of the New Tower of Babel, from where he communicates with all other major world capitals. Freder witnesses his father firing his first secretary over one clerical error. Freder argues for the man but Joh is unmoved. He believes a man is to be defined by his ability to work and how much he can work. Joh is disappointed that his son speaks sympathetically for the men in depths of Metropolis who are driven to exhaustion manning the machines that make the city live. Joh suggests one day there will be a replacement for man – the man-machine.

Freder goes, and Joh instructs Slim to keep constant watch over his son.

=== Chapter III ===
Freders seeks and finds his father’s first secretary, a man named Josaphat, who is riding the pater-noster (a kind of elevator) without getting off on any level. Freder joins him, and asks for his help – which Josaphat gratefully agrees to – and instructs him to go home and wait, for him or for a messenger.

Once they part, Freder descends into the depths. He goes to a man who is operating a machine, exerting himself in tedious repetition, lost in a rambling prayer to God, to the machine, and to Joh Frederson. When Freder interrupts him, the man collapses.

Freder tells the man, named Georgi (number 11811) they will change clothes, and he will take Georgi’s place at the machine. He gives further instruction to wait for him at Josaphat’s apartment. Freder begins the ten hour shift in Georgi’s dark blue linen uniform and hard shoes.

Georgi goes to the street in Freder’s fine silk clothes and soft footwear, and takes a car for hire. Georgi is overwhelmed by the magnificent sights of Metropolis, which he has always served but never experienced. He is seduced by advertisements for the night club Yoshiwara (and the tremendous amount of cash in his pockets) and decides to go there instead.

=== Chapter IV ===
The Magician’s House is the oldest house in Metropolis, with a red pentagram set into every door. The Magician vanished many years past, but the house remains cursed, and none have been able to destroy it. This is the home of Rotwang, the great inventor. Years ago he and Frederson had a falling out over Hel, who partnered with Joh and presumably died in giving birth to Freder. Rotwang keeps a bust of Hel on prominent display.

Joh visits Rotwang to ask if he understands a message Grot discovered in the possession of an injured worker. First, Rotwang reveals Futura, an artificial humanoid being. Joh had requested a man-machine, but is repulsed by the humanoid yet faceless form of Futura.

Rotwang recognizes the message as a map of the maze of tunnels beneath the city – a labyrinth in which the Magician himself became lost and died. They agree to meet at the change of shift and follow the map. When Joh returns to the Brain of Metropolis, Slim informs him that Freder is missing.

=== Chapter V ===
At the conclusion of the ten-hour shift, Freder is exhausted and delirious. He is helped away from his machine by an anonymous worker who informs him that “she” has called and asks if he is coming. He follows and is overwhelmed to discover the workers have gathered to hear Maria speak.

Maria tells the parable of Babel. A man proposed a tower to the heavens, but those who did the work knew nothing of what they were making and grew angry, and brought the tower down. The lesson; the mediator between the brain and the hands must be the heart.

When pressed about this mediator, Maria asks for patience. The men depart, Freder stays, and the two speak. He tells her how she has changed his life and given it purpose. But they have been watched and overheard by Joh and Rotwang, who are in hiding. Joh instructs Rotwang to give Futura Maria’s image.

Once the young lovers part, Rotwang pursues Maria who, terrified, becomes lost in the catacombs, eventually finding the trap door to Rotwang’s home. Maria is trapped.

=== Chapter VI ===
Slim arrives at Yoshiwara, seeking Freder. He is met by the proprietor, a man named September. September shows him Georgi, who has been under the influence of the drug “Maohee.” His silken clothes are in tatters, his soft shoes bloodied, Georgi had been on a terrifying rampage, horrifying the guests and assaulting the sex workers.

Taking Georgi to a medical facility, Slim learns from Georgi about his encounter with Freder, and his instruction to wait at Josaphat’s apartment.

=== Chapter VII ===
Freder is distressed to learn Georgi never made it to Josaphat’s. Josaphat lives alone in three well-appointed rooms. Freder knows Slim will be on his trail. Josaphat swears his allegiance, as a supplicant, but Freder insists their bond will be as equals. Shortly after Freder goes, Slim arrives and pressures Josaphat to accept an unconscionable amount of money to leave Metropolis forever, and the offer becomes irrefusable to Josaphat. He accepts.

=== Chapter VIII ===
Freder goes to the cathedral, seeking Maria. He has not entered this building since he was a child. He spies the woodcarved figure of Death, flanked by the Seven Deadly Sins. Desertus, the monk, orders the son of Joh Frederson to leave, and he does. Passing Rotwang’s house, the former house of the Magician, he is stunned to briefly see Maria at a window.

He enters, and becomes lost in a maze of doors and empty rooms, following Maria’s voice – or two voices, one calling to him seductively, the other in distress. He runs through the house to no avail and collapses in exhaustion.

Elsewhere in the house, Rotwang, who has been tracking Freder’s folly, goes to Maria, who is strapped into a chair. He taunts her, and she resists responding until he says Freder will one day marry – but never to her. She breaks, crying, “Never!”

Ashamed, Rotwang goes to Futura, whom he has nearly completed in providing Maria’s image.

Freder awakens trapped in a room with one window. From it, he sees Maria departing the house and going into the city. After many tries, Freder breaks the door to the room open and escapes the house. He tries to find Maria at her home, but no one admits to remembering she lived there or who she is. He thinks to ask his father and goes to the Brain-pan in the New Tower of Babel and finds Maria laughing in Joh’s arms.

Freder attempts to throttle his father. After a terrible struggle, Freder sees that Maria is no longer there. Joh says there never was anyone else in the room, and Freder is rendered helpless, laughing like one deranged.

=== Chapter IX ===
A plane is flying Josaphat away from Metropolis. He assaults the pilot, killing him, and parachutes to safety in a field.

=== Chapter X ===
Josaphat cannot gain entrance to Freder’s apartments, but watches from a distance, witnessing as Freder wanders the rooms and balconies, speaking to no one. Joh visits Freder, talking to him for hours before leaving him be. Josaphat finally attains entrance and he and Freder reunite.

Josaphat confesses his betrayal, Freder does not judge him. Freder admits his desire to murder his father, until the one time Joh did not blare the shift change so as not to disturb his sleeping son. That was when Freder knew his father had forgiven him.

Freder then recounts a dream, in which Metropolis is vacant, but alive, a living city. He seeks refuge in the cathedral where he is witness to a Book of Revelation inspired phantasm including a priest crying, “Repent,” the Whore of Babylon with Maria’s face, and Death leading the Seven Deadly Sins.

=== Chapter XI ===
Josaphat tries to assure Freder it was just a dream, But Freder continues, and it is unclear if this is true or the continuation of a dream. He goes out to the cathedral where Desertus was preaching of the fall of Babylon, and notices the statue of Death is missing. He encounters Jan, an old associate from the Club of the Sons, who leads him to the house adjacent to Rotwang’s and gives an account of a recent event when many were invited there to be introduced to a woman whom Rotwang called his daughter. It was Futura, and her presence overwhelms the men and enrages the women. Jan says her name is Maria, and that she has been seen in two places at once. Then Slim arrives and escorts Freder home.

The city screams the shift change, and Josaphat says many workers will be going to hear Maria speak in the City of the Dead, and Freder decides to go.

=== Chapter XII ===
Joh Frederson’s mother was horrified when she first learned how her son’s master plan involved the constant physical degradation of men. He wanted her near, but she did not want to leave her home, so he had it relocated, yard, tree and all, to the roof of a skyscraper in Metropolis.

He goes to visit her to ask her help in regaining the love of his son, but she will only remind him of his undying love for Hel, and that one must never come between lovers. He leaves his mother’s house, vowing never to return.

=== Chapter XIII ===
Rotwang continues to monologue at Maria, long rambling soliloquies, to which she refuses to respond. He has become infatuated with her, and pleads for her affection. He changes tactics and taunts her, telling her that those who normally come to hear her speak are missing her, and lost without her. He finally tells he has stolen her soul and passed it onto another who is even now planning to speak to the workers in her guise in the City of the Dead, and deliver a message directly from Joh Frederson, and that if she would only take him by the hands, he would lead her there. She weeps, but it is too late, because Joh Frederson is there, and has heard Rotwang’s betrayal, and strangles him.

=== Chapter XIV ===
Freder cloaks himself and hides in the City of the Dead, with a congregation of workers. Futura – assuming the role of Maria – rouses the workers to destroy the machines. Freder reveals himself, and calls this Maria a fake. The workers attack the son of Joh Frederson. As one draws a knife, Georgi throws himself before the blade and receives a mortal wound. The crowd follows Maria in a mob to destroy the machines. Georgi, as his final act, shows Freder safe passage out of the depths.

Freder goes to the Brain-pan of the New Tower of Babel. His father absent, Freder touches the blue plate and the city screams, “Danger!”

=== Chapter XV ===
Maria is traumatized by the sight of Joh murdering Rotwang. She resolves to escape, passing the prone form of Rotwang as she descends through the trap door into the City of the Dead. She arrives at the site of her gatherings, and notes Georgi’s spilled blood. The walls begin to shift and she can hear the voice of Metropolis scream, “Danger!”

Futura leads a mob to the Heart Machine, which powers all other machines in Metropolis, jealously guarded by Grot, who fails to keep them away. Futura removes the safety from the Heart Machine, and it begins to rise in temperature.

=== Chapter XVI ===
In the streets of Metropolis, Freder calls out for this father. The city is already reacting violently to the abandonment of the machines. Buildings are collapsing, forges overflowing, citizens running pell mell for safety.

Freder runs into the depths and witnesses the machines running wild. The Heart Machine is normally set to six. Futura has set it to twelve. Freder sees all the machines as gods that are rising up to destroy Metropolis. He spies his father standing on a high platform. Joh claims to have allowed the destruction of the machines so that his son may rebuild them.

Freder does not accept this, and says that he will go to Rotwang for help, but his father says Rotwang is dead. Then, the Heart Machine dies.

=== Chapter XVII ===
Maria awakens to discover waters are rising in the underground city. Long ago, Joh Frederson had redirected a river and built pumps to continually manage its flow, but those pumps are damaged and the city is flooding. Attempting escape (and tormented by voices in the water) Maria discovers that the children of the workers have been abandoned by their parents in their passion to destroy the machines. She urges them all to follow, but cannot reach the surface because access is blocked by heavy, damaged machinery. She begins to tell the children a story to keep them from being frightened.

=== Chapter XVIII ===
Maria is trapped underground with the children as the walls collapse and the waters rise. She continues to keep them calm with a pleasant story. Freder hears, and tries to raise the trap door which is obstructed. He leaves and finds Grot, who is still hysterical over the destruction of his beloved Heart Machine. Together they clear debris and free the children, but Grot believes Maria to be Futura and attacks her. Only the children can stop him from killing her.

=== Chapter XIX ===
The children are taken to the House of the Sons. Maria tells Feder to go to his father. The sex workers of the House of the Sons care for the children. Maria goes out and sees Futura leading a procession from Yoshiwara, and also the monk Desertus, bound to a cross and carried by the Gothics, his followers from the cathedral. Workers, too, are marching the streets, and when they see Maria they believe she has betrayed them and attempt to capture and burn her. Maria collapses on the steps of the cathedral.

=== Chapter XX ===
Josaphat finds Freder with Grot in the depths, among the damaged machines. He tells them the mob is burning Maria at the stake. They go, Grot stays. Freder and Josaphat race in a car, but the city has been terribly disrupted, and many bridges are out. Freder makes a dangerous drive across a partially destroyed bridge, and their car overturns. Freder runs, Josaphat loses consciousness.

Freder reaches the square before the cathedral, and he sees who he and the crowd believe to be Maria, bound above a burning pyre. The mob sees the son of Joh Frederson and bind him, too, to watch, as Maria calls, “Dance with me, my dearest!”

=== Chapter XXI ===
Rotwang, not dead, recovers his senses. But the trauma of strangulation (and presumably, lack of oxygen to the brain) has rendered him confused and unable to cope with reality. He seeks Hel, and as he passes the cathedral he recognizes Futura burning in the pyre. He also spies the true Maria, cowering in the cathedral, and runs to her – believing her to be Hel. He chases her into the cathedral, and up the stairs into the belfry. She climbs outside the bell tower, where Freder can now hear her cries, breaks free of his bonds and pursues.

=== Chapter XXII ===
Joh Frederson is stymied by his desire to know the fate of his son. Slim returns, uncharacteristically emotional, as he has failed to find Freder. Josaphat takes the stairs, all 106 flights, to see Joh. Recognizing him, Joh begs Josaphat’s forgiveness for allowing harm to come to him, and for his own many other sins. Josaphat tells what he knows – that Freder has been taken by the mob. Joh and Josaphat make their way to the cathedral where Joh sees Freder and Rotwang locked in a struggle to the death, high atop the cathedral, with Maria witnessing.

Josaphat is able to get the assembled to listen, that their children are safe from harm in the House of the Sons.

Freder rescues Maria, Rotwang allows himself to plummet from the cathedral to his death. Joh falls to his knees, overcome with gratitude for the survival of his son. His hair has turned entirely white.

=== Chapter XXIII ===
Joh finds Freder with Maria, tells him that he has changed, and he and his son reconcile. Freder fears Maria has died, and his father – one who has known what it is like to hold their beloved dead – reassures him that she is only asleep. He goes, Maria revives, she and Freder embrace. Joh decides to return to his mother.

=== Chapter XXIV ===
Maria tells Freder that his father has changed, and asks if he can forgive him, as they should forgive the men she calls brothers who brought such devastation, and be their moderator.

=== Chapter XXV ===
Joh visits his mother, where there is a tearful reconciliation. He believes he might need to be the one to lead the city forward, but does not know how. His mother reveals a letter Hel had given her to provide Joh only when he had repented, and for which he is grateful.

== Notable Quotations ==
- Metropolis raised her voice. The machines of Metropolis roared; they wanted to be fed.
- Avoid assuming people to be good, innocent, and victimized, just because they suffer.
- Hel, born to be my happiness, a blessing to all men, lost to Joh Frederson, dying in giving life to his son Freder.
- Great is the world and its Creator! And great is man!
- Brain and Hands need a Mediator. The Mediator between Brain and Hands must be the Heart.
- I love mankind, not for its own sake, but for your sake – because you love it.
- For the inventive spirit of man there is no Utopia: there is only a Not-Yet.
- Can one confide oneself to somebody of whom one knows nothing but how his laughter sounds?
- Nothing happens in Metropolis which does not come to my father’s ears.
- You have forgotten that lovers are sacred.
- Death to the machines!
- In the machine rooms were wounded machines, in agony, wanting to obey and not being able.
- God! Where art thou!
- You have suffered … you have been redeemed by suffering. You have attained to bliss. Is it worthwhile to suffer? Yes.

== See also ==
- Maschinenmensch
- Rotwang
- 1925 in science fiction
- 1926 in science fiction
