= Belgundi =

Belgundi Belgundhi
- Village
- Interactive map of Belgundi
- Coordinates: 15°50′N 74°24′E
- Country: India
- State: Karnataka
- District: Belgaum
- Talukas: Belgaum

Government
  - Type: Panchayat

Population (2013)
  - Total: 6,000

Languages
  - Official: Kannada
  - Spoken: Kannada, Marathi
- Time zone: UTC+5:30 (IST)
- PIN: 591108
- Telephone code: 0831
- Vehicle registration: KA 22
- Nearest city: Belgaum
- Literacy: 80%
- Vidhan Sabha constituency: Karnataka

Belgundi is a village in Belgaum district in the southern state of Karnataka, India. The local languages are Kannada and Marathi. The village is located at the state border of Karnataka and Maharashtra.
