= The Indian Tomb (1938 film) =

1938 film directed by Richard Eichberg

- Film poster
- Directed by: Richard Eichberg
- Screenplay by: Richard Eichberg (writer); Hans Klaehr (writer); Arthur Pohl (writer)
- Based on: The Indian Tomb by Thea von Harbou
- Produced by: Richard Eichberg (producer); Herbert Engelsing (line producer)
- Cinematography: Ewald Daub; W. Meyer-Bergelt; Hans Schneeberger; Hugo O. Schulze
- Edited by: Willy Zeyn
- Music by: Harald Böhmelt
- Release date: 1938
- Running time: 94 minutes; 100 minutes (Germany)
- Country: Germany
- Language: German

The Indian Tomb (German: Das indische Grabmal) is a 1938 German adventure film directed by Richard Eichberg and starring Philip Dorn, La Jana and Theo Lingen. It is the sequel to Eichberg's The Tiger of Eschnapur.

== Plot ==
While Fürbringer, Emil Sperling and his wife Lotte Sperling continue to work on the Maharaja's construction projects in India, Prince Ramigani manages to track down Sitha in a second-rate variety show in Bombay. Sitha has managed to contact Irene Traven, but is kidnapped by Prince Ramigani before she can talk to Irene. As the Maharaja travels to Eschnapur with his entourage and shows Irene his country, Ramigani conspires with other nobles to instigate a revolt to make himself the new Maharaja. Sitha is taken to a remote and heavily guarded mountain castle, but her servant Myrrha facilitates a meeting with Irene. When Irene asks the Maharaja for mercy for Sitha, the latter refuses. Ramigani plans to kill the Maharaja during a festival and has Irene Traven and Fürbringer captured. Disguised as an Indian, Emil Sperling escapes capture and frees Fürbringer and Irene with the help of Sascha Demidoff. Ramigani forces Sitha to dance at the festival. When she approaches the Maharaja in her dance and warns of the attack by Ramigani, she is shot. The revolt that breaks out is suppressed. Ramigani tries to escape his just punishment but is killed. The Maharaja asks Fürbringer to stay to complete the tomb of Sitha.

== Cast ==
- Philip Dorn as Maharadscha von Eschnapur
- Kitty Jantzen as Irene Traven
- La Jana as Sitha, eine indische Tänzerin
- Theo Lingen as Emil Sperling
- Hans Stüwe as Peter Fürbringer, Architekt
- Alexander Golling as Prinz Ramigani, Vetter des Maharadscha
- Gustav Diessl as Sascha Demidoff, Ingenieur
- Gisela Schlüter as Lotte Sperling
- Karl Haubenreißer as Gopal, Würdenträger in Eschnapur
- Olaf Bach as Sadhu, Radscha eines Bergvolkes
- Rosa Jung as Myrrha, Vertraute der Maharani
- Albert Hörrmann as Ragupati, im Dienste Ramiganis
- Gerhard Bienert as Ratani, Werkmeister
- Valy Arnheim as Wachmann Ramura
- Carl Auen as Indischer Nobiler
- Rudolf Essek as Hotelgast in Bombay
- Jutta Jol as Indische dienerin bei irene traven
- Fred Goebel as Indischer Ingenieur
- Klaus Pohl as Inder, der beim Fest nach den Gewehren fragt
- Paul Rehkopf as Indischer Nobiler
- Gerhard Dammann
- Josef Peterhans as Indischer Nobiler

== Bibliography ==
- Goble, Alan. The Complete Index to Literary Sources in Film. Walter de Gruyter, 1999.
