= Döhlau =

- Municipality
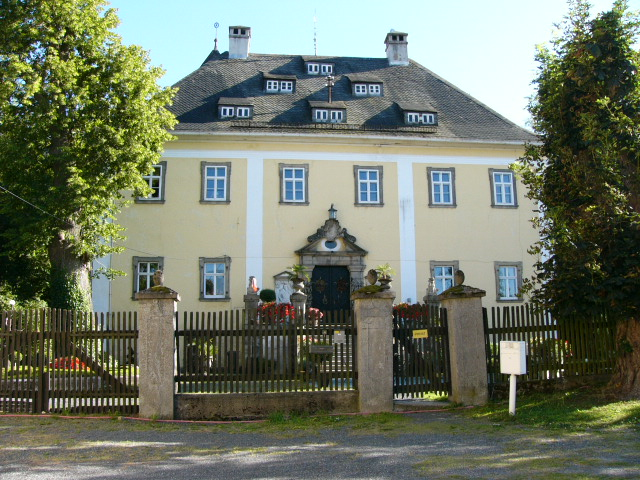
- Döhlau Castle

- Coat of arms

- Location of Döhlau within Hof district
- Interactive map of Döhlau
- Location within Germany Location within Bavaria
- Coordinates: 50°16′N 11°56′E
- Country: Germany
- State: Bavaria
- Admin. region: Oberfranken
- District: Hof
- Subdivisions: 8 Ortsteile

Government
  - Mayor (2020–26): Marc Ultsch (SPD)

Area
  - Total: 15.25 km^{2} (5.89 sq mi)
- Elevation: 500 m (1,600 ft)

Population (2025-12-31)
  - Total: 3,741
  - Density: 245.3/km^{2} (635.4/sq mi)
- Time zone: UTC+01:00 (CET)
  - Summer (DST): UTC+02:00 (CEST)
- Postal codes: 95182
- Dialling codes: 09286 (in Teilen: 09281 u. 09283)
- Vehicle registration: HO
- Website: www.doehlau.de

Döhlau (German pronunciation: [ˈdøːlaʊ]) is a municipality in Upper Franconia in the district of Hof in Bavaria in Germany. It lies on the Saale River.
