= Thea von Harbou =

German author, film director, & actress (1888–1954)

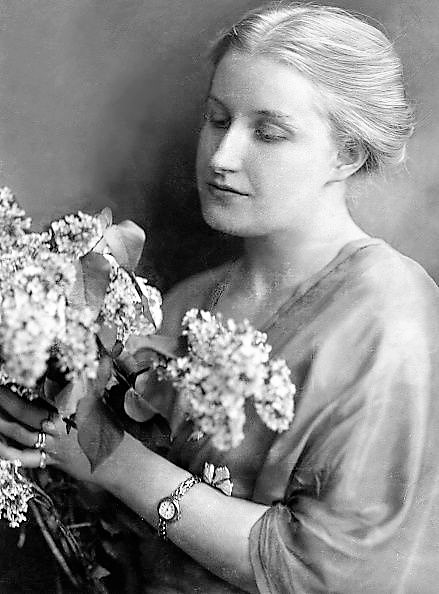
- Thea von Harbou, about 1928
- Born: Thea Gabriele von Harbou; 27 December 1888; Tauperlitz, Bavaria, German Empire
- Died: 1 July 1954 (aged 65); West Berlin, West Germany
- Occupations: Filmmaker; actress; author
- Years active: 1905–1954
- Spouses: Rudolf Klein-Rogge (m. 1914; div. 1920) Fritz Lang (m. 1922; div. 1933)
- Partner: Ayi Tendulkar (c. 1933–c. 1939)

Thea Gabriele von Harbou (27 December 1888 – 1 July 1954) was a German screenwriter, novelist, film director, and actress. She is remembered as the screenwriter of the science fiction film classic Metropolis (1927) and for the 1925 novel on which it was based. As a screenwriter, she worked with the film director Fritz Lang, her husband, during the period of transition from silent to sound films.

== Early life, family, and education ==
Thea von Harbou was born in 1888 in Tauperlitz, in the Kingdom of Bavaria, now part of Döhlau, into a family of minor nobility and government officials, which gave her a level of sophisticated comfort. As a child, she was educated in a convent and by private tutors who taught her several languages as well as piano and violin. She was a child prodigy.

Her first works, a short story published in a magazine and a volume of poems published privately, focused on perceptions of art, subjects considered unusual for a girl of thirteen. Despite her privileged childhood, Harbou wanted to earn a living on her own, which led her to become an actress despite her father's disapproval.

== From novelist to screenwriter ==
After her stage debut in 1906, Harbou met the actor Rudolf Klein-Rogge and married him during World War I. By 1917, she and Klein-Rogge had moved to Berlin, where Harbou devoted herself to building her career as a writer. She was drawn to writing epic myths and legends with an overtly nationalistic tone. In one historian's estimation: "Her novels became patriotic and morale-boosting, urging women to sacrifice and duty while promoting the eternal glory of the fatherland".

Harbou's first close interaction with cinema came when German director Joe May decided to adapt a piece of her fiction, Die heilige Simplizia. From that moment, "Her fiction output slowed down. In short order she would become one of Germany's most celebrated film writers, not only because of her partnership with Fritz Lang, but also for writing scripts for F. W. Murnau, Carl Dreyer, E. A. Dupont, and other German luminaries".

Her brother, Horst von Harbou, worked for Universum Film as a photographer and began to work closely with Thea and Fritz Lang on many of their most famous productions.

== Partnership with Lang ==
Thea von Harbou's first collaboration with Fritz Lang was marked by a common interest in India. As Harbou worked on an adaptation of her novel The Indian Tomb (Das indische Grabmal, 1918), Joe May assigned Lang to help her write the screenplay and work out production details. Praising Harbou's skills, Erich Kettelhut recalled: "She was not only well-liked by her colleagues, but also as much a creative force, as highly motivated and smoothly efficient, as her husband. Her loving personality was crucial to the professional teamwork. von Harbou's ability to reach out to people and find compromise in the worst situations was a vital resource."

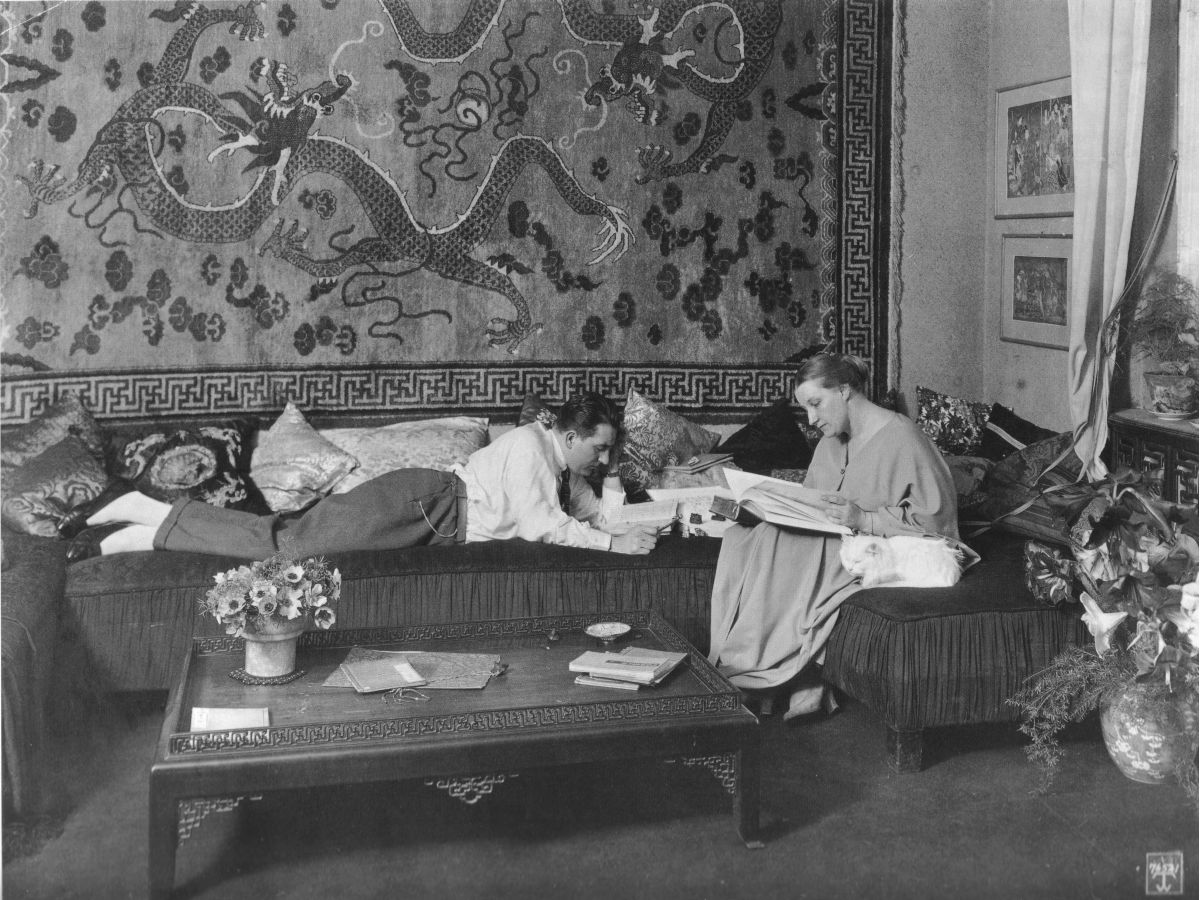
Fritz Lang and Thea von Harbou in their Berlin flat, 1923 or 1924

Harbou and Lang began an affair during this time; she divorced Klein-Rogge in 1920. Following the success of Dr. Mabuse der Spieler (Dr. Mabuse the Gambler) and the death of Lang's first wife, the couple married in 1922. They worked on a script that would reflect their pride in their German heritage, Die Nibelungen (1924), and enhance Harbou's reputation as a writer for the screen. She became known for her unique habit of wearing the same dress throughout filming, even as she cooked hot meals for the crew during late nights. Visitors remembered Harbou taking charge of all the domestic and social responsibilities when visiting the couple's apartment. During this time of poverty in 1920s Germany, Harbou became active in acquiring food for her film crew, as one friend recalled, "She was even able to talk the UFA into carrying the costs so the crew could get their meals for free ... she stood there on the rough floor of that drafty shed for hours and didn't mind peeling potatoes or cleaning vegetables with the other women. Such was the spirit of sacrifice."

Harbou often developed her screenplays into full-length novels, with their publication scheduled to coincide with the release of the film, though this was not the case with Metropolis (1927). Harbou was a central player in producing Metropolis, and this epic became significant. Besides writing both the novel and the screenplay and developing the distinct moral ending of Metropolis, Harbou discovered Gustav Fröhlich, who played the lead role of Freder Fredersen.

Her next major collaboration with Lang was M (1931), a film about a child murderer. It was written with exquisite attention to accuracy. Lang and Harbou had been enthralled with news coverage of Peter Kürten, known as the Monster of Düsseldorf, during the late 1920s. She used newspaper articles in developing the script and "maintained regular contact with the police headquarters on Alexanderplatz and was permitted access to the communications and secret publications of Berlin's force". Recalling the script, Harbou's secretary Hilde Guttmann later said, "I saw many other film manuscripts, but never one which could compare with the manuscript for M. Two typewriter ribbons were stuck together to give us three colors: one black and red, and the other blue. The camera work and the action were typed in black, the dialogue blue, and the sound, where synchronized, was typed in red". Harbou received no credit as the script writer for M.

She was also involved in politics, joining the campaign against Germany's paragraph 218, which made abortion a crime. At a mass rally in 1931, she said:

Our main goal is to find a new form of preventing pregnancy and therefore to make the entire 218 unnecessary. Immediately, however, the paragraph must fall because it is no longer morally recognized by women. It is no longer a law. We need a new sexual code because the old was created by men and no man is in a position to understand the agony of a woman who is carrying a child she knows she cannot feed. This law derived from male psychology, which forces a woman into having a child, creates, even if not deliberately, constitutional inferiority of women in relation to men which serves as a bulwark against women's activity in economic and political life.

=== Divorce ===
Shortly after Harbou married Lang, he developed the habit of openly pursuing younger women, but they nevertheless presented themselves as a happy couple with a contented home that would have seemed like a small museum of exotic art for the common citizen. Then, during the production of Das Testament des Dr. Mabuse, Lang discovered Harbou in bed with Ayi Tendulkar, an Indian journalist and student seventeen years younger than her.

After Lang and Harbou's divorce became final on 20 April 1933, the couple slowly lost contact with each other. Shortly after the divorce, Harbou and Ayi Tendulkar contracted a secret marriage, because the Nazi state did not permit someone of her public stature to marry a dark-skinned Indian.

== Under Nazi rule ==
After Adolf Hitler's Nazi Party took power in 1933, the German film industry began to be used for propaganda purposes. Harbou was loyal to the new regime and joined the Party. Around 1934, on her own initiative, she wrote and directed two films, Elisabeth und der Narr and Hanneles Himmelfahrt, but did not find the experience of directing satisfactory and remained a prolific screenwriter during this time. "Under a regime where every film was a 'state film,' Thea von Harbou amassed writing credits on some twenty-six films, while giving uncredited assistance on countless others-including a handful with an indisputable National Socialist worldview".

When war broke out in 1939, Tendulkar was forced to leave Germany, and their marriage ended. With Harbou's blessing, he courted and later married an Indian woman, who visited Harbou in 1953.

== After World War II ==
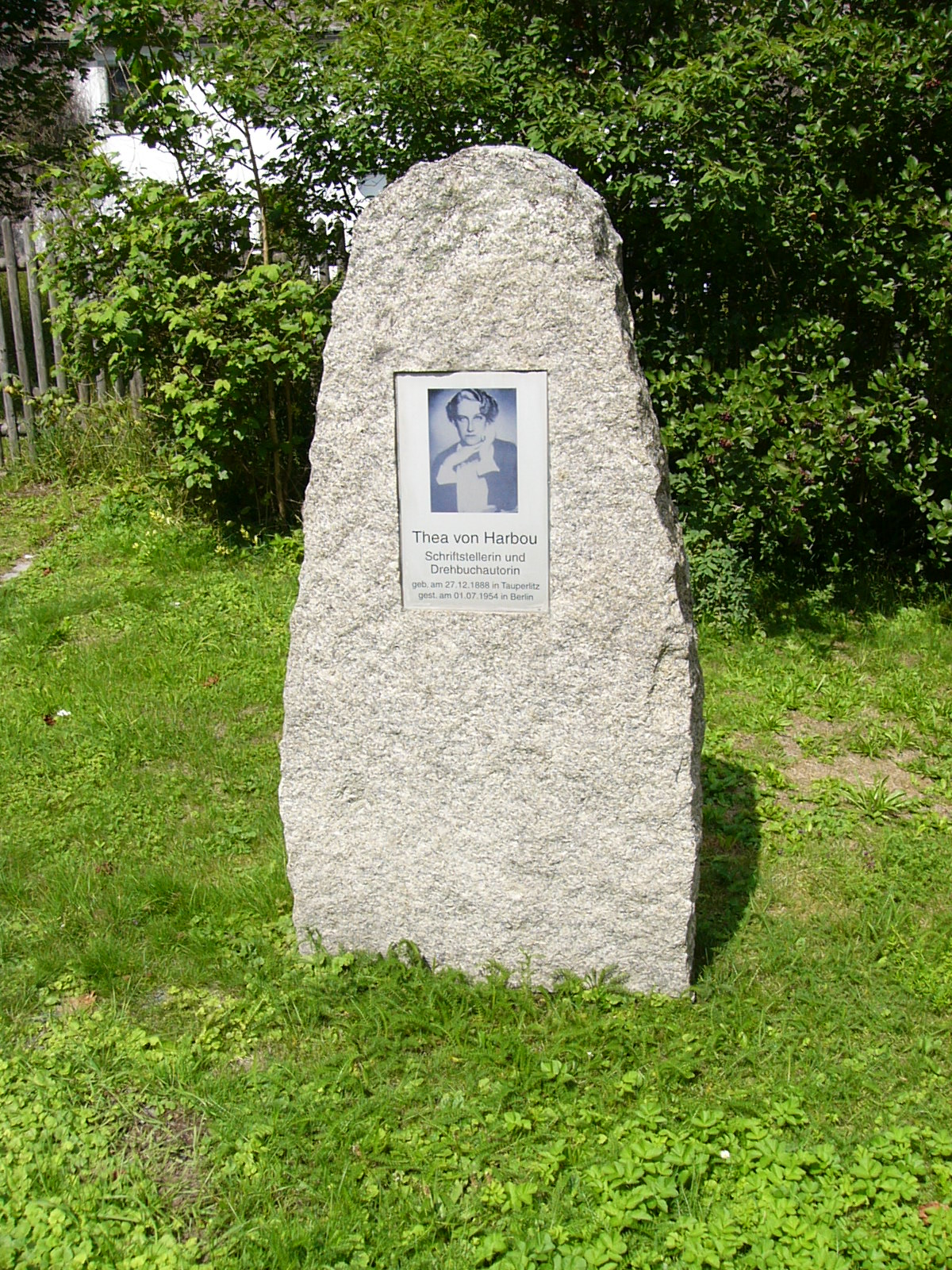
A monument in her hometown of Tauperlitz

After the defeat of Nazi Germany Thea von Harbou was held from July to October 1945 in a British-run internment camp in Staumühle. Though many have asserted she had significant Nazi sympathies, Harbou claimed she only joined the Nazi Party to continue her husband's help to Indian immigrants to Germany. Lang's biographer, Patrick McGilligan, wrote: "Her direct work on behalf of the government consisted, she claimed, entirely of volunteer welding, making hearing aids, and emergency medical care. In fact, she received a medal of merit for saving people in two air raids." In prison, she directed a performance of Faust and when released she worked as a Trümmerfrau (rubble woman) in 1945 and 1946.

== Death ==
Toward the end of Harbou's life, pain from high blood pressure, migraines, and neuralgia weakened her, although she continued to write or dictate from her bed. After attending a showing of Der müde Tod (Destiny, 1921) as a guest of honor in June 1954, she fell and suffered serious internal injuries in a hip. On 1 July 1954, five days later, she died in hospital at the age of sixty-five.

Several years after her death, Lang directed the film The Indian Tomb (1959), based upon one of Harbou's novels.

== Filmography ==
Some of Harbou's most prominent films:

- The Passion of Inge Krafft, directed by Robert Dinesen (1921, based on an idea by Thea von Harbou)
- Das Haus des Dr. Gaudeamus, directed by Friedrich Feher (1921, based on the novel Das Haus ohne Tür und Fenster)
- The Indian Tomb, directed by Joe May (1921, based on the novel The Indian Tomb)
- The Stone Rider, directed by Fritz Wendhausen (1923, based on an idea by Thea von Harbou)
- Metropolis, directed by Fritz Lang (1927, based on the novel Metropolis)
- Spione, directed by Fritz Lang (1928, based on the novel Spione)
- Woman in the Moon, directed by Fritz Lang (1929, based on the novel The Rocket to the Moon)

== Bibliography ==
Some of Harbou's most prominent books:

- Das indische Grabmal (The Indian Tomb), 1918
- Metropolis, 1925 (at Gutenberg)
- Frau im Mond (Woman in the Moon), 1928

== Sources ==
- McGilligan, Patrick (1997). Fritz Lang: The Nature of the Beast. New York: St. Martin's Press. ISBN 978-0-312-19454-3.
