= The Indian Tomb =

1918 novel by Thea von Harbou

- 1938 edition of Das indische Grabmal
- Author: Thea von Harbou
- Original title: Das indische Grabmal
- Translator: John Mucci; Richard Felnagle
- Language: German
- Publisher: Ullstein & Co
- Publication date: 1918
- Publication place: Germany
- English publication date: 20 October 2016
- Pages: 378

The Indian Tomb (German: Das indische Grabmal) is a 1918 novel by the German writer Thea von Harbou. It tells the story of a German architect who is commissioned by an Indian maharajah to create a large monument, only to learn that it is meant for the maharajah's unfaithful lover, who will be buried alive as punishment. The book was published in German by Ullstein & Co. in 1918 and in English translation by John Mucci and Richard Felnagle in 2016. It was adapted for film in 1921, 1938 and 1959.

== Adaptations ==
All three film adaptions are divided into two parts:

- The Indian Tomb, a 1921 silent film directed by Joe May.
  - Part 1: The Mission of the Yogi (German: Die Sendung des Yoghi)
  - Part 2: The Tiger of Bengal (German: Der Tiger von Eschnapur)
- 1938 film directed by Richard Eichberg.
  - Part 1: The Tiger of Eschnapur
  - Part 2: The Indian Tomb
- 1959 film directed by Fritz Lang.
  - Part 1: The Tiger of Eschnapur
  - Part 2: The Indian Tomb
