= The Indian Tomb (1921 film) =

1921 film directed by Joe May

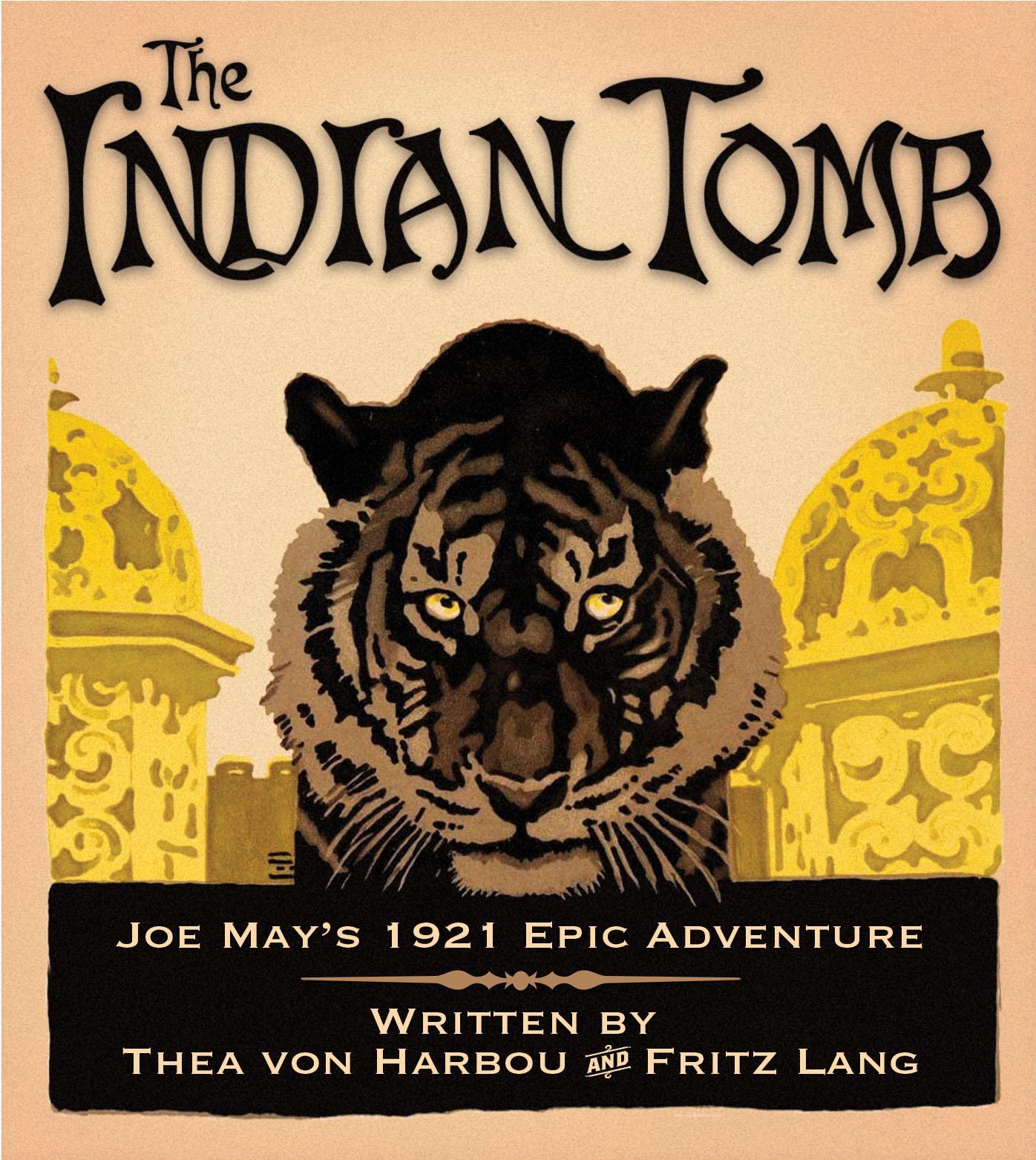
- film poster
- Directed by: Joe May
- Screenplay by: Thea von Harbou; Fritz Lang
- Based on: The Indian Tomb by Thea von Harbou
- Produced by: Joe May
- Starring: Olaf Fønss; Mia May; Conrad Veidt
- Cinematography: Werner Brandes
- Music by: Wilhelm Löwitt
- Production company: May-Film
- Release date: 22 October 1921 (Berlin)
- Country: Germany

Part I: The Mission of the Yogi

Part II: The Tiger of Bengal

The Indian Tomb (German: Das indische Grabmal) is a two-part 1921 German silent film directed by Joe May.

It is based on the 1918 novel The Indian Tomb by Thea von Harbou. It comprised two parts, Part I: The Mission of the Yogi and Part II: The Tiger of Bengal (German: Die Sendung des Yoghi; Der Tiger von Eschnapur). Part I received its première in Berlin on 22 October 1921, and Part II on 17 November 1921.

Upon its release, it was neither a critical nor commercial success and has been little seen until two recent restorations were completed, a European film restoration and a U.S. video restoration by David Shepard.

== Cast ==
- Olaf Fønss – Herbert Rowland
- Mia May – Irene Amundsen, Rowland's fiancée
- Conrad Veidt – Ayan III, the Maharajah of Bengal
- Erna Morena – Princess Savitri
- Bernhard Goetzke – Ramigani 'Rami', the Yogi
- Lya De Putti – Mirrjha
- Paul Richter – MacAllan, an English officer
- Georg John – A penitent
- Louis Brody – Black servant
- Max Adalbert – (uncredited)
