= Fritz Lang =

Austrian filmmaker (1890–1976)

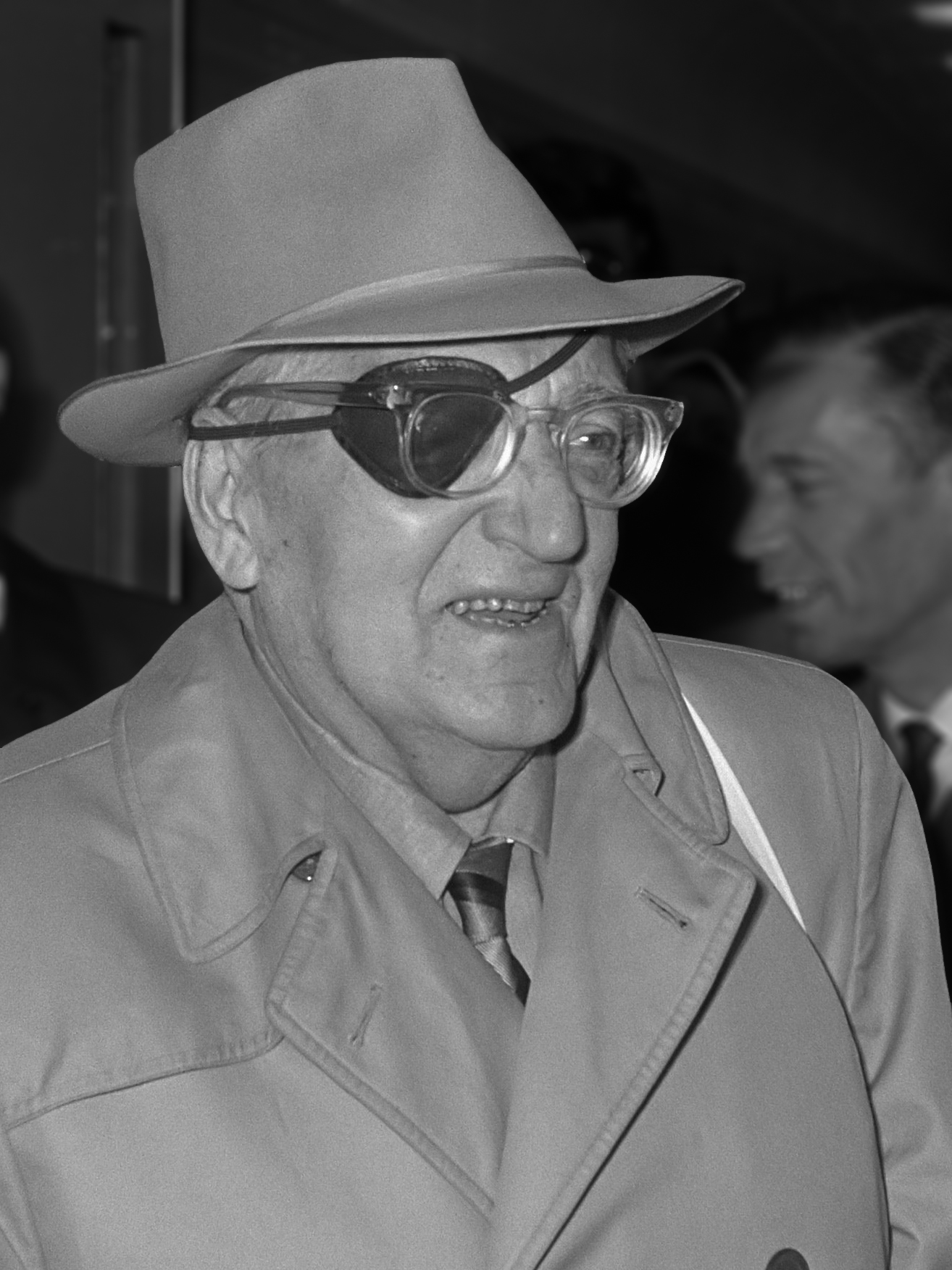
- Lang in 1969
- Born: Friedrich Christian Anton Lang; December 5, 1890; Vienna, Austria-Hungary (now Austria)
- Died: August 2, 1976 (aged 85); Beverly Hills, California, U.S.
- Resting place: Forest Lawn Memorial Park
- Citizenship: Austria; Germany (later renounced); United States (after 1939)
- Education: Technical University of Vienna
- Occupations: Film director; producer; screenwriter; actor
- Years active: 1910–1976
- Spouses: Lisa Rosenthal (m. 1919; died 1920) Thea von Harbou (m. 1922; div. 1933) Lily Latté (m. 1971)

Friedrich Christian Anton Lang (Austrian German: [ˈfriːdrɪç ˈkrɪsti̯a(ː)n ˈantɔn ˈlaŋ]; December 5, 1890 – August 2, 1976), better known as Fritz Lang (Austrian German: [ˈfrɪts ˈlaŋ]), was an Austrian film director, screenwriter, and producer, who worked in Germany and later the United States. One of the best-known émigrés from Germany's school of Expressionism, he was dubbed the "Master of Darkness" by the British Film Institute. He has been cited as one of the most influential filmmakers of all time.

Lang's work spans five decades, from the Expressionist silent films of his first German creative period to his short stay in Paris and his work as a Hollywood director to his last three films made in Germany. Lang's most celebrated films include the futuristic science-fiction film Metropolis (1927) and the influential M (1931), a film noir precursor. His 1929 film Woman in the Moon showcased the use of a multi-stage rocket, and also pioneered the concept of a rocket launch pad (a rocket standing upright against a tall building before launch having been slowly rolled into place) and the rocket-launch countdown clock.

His other major films include Dr. Mabuse the Gambler (1922) and its sequel The Testament of Dr. Mabuse (1933), Die Nibelungen (1924), and after moving to Hollywood in 1934, Fury (1936), You Only Live Once (1937), Hangmen Also Die! (1943), The Woman in the Window (1944), Scarlet Street (1945) and The Big Heat (1953). He became a naturalized citizen of the United States in 1939. He returned to Germany in the late 1950s, directing a two-part adaptation of his ex-wife Thea von Harbou's novel The Indian Tomb, and a third Dr. Mabuse film (1960).

== Early life ==
Lang was born in Vienna, as the second son of Anton Lang (1860–1940), an architect and construction company manager, and his wife Pauline "Paula" Lang (née Schlesinger; 1864–1920). There is no documented evidence of the true identity of Anton Lang's biological father; he was born as an illegitimate child of a maid from Moravia. Anton Lang was described as a "lapsed Catholic", and was a builder and partner in Honus and Lang, an important construction company Pauline Lang was born Jewish and converted to Catholicism. Fritz Lang was baptized on December 28, 1890, at the Schottenkirche in Vienna. He had an elder brother, Adolf (1884–1961).

Lang's father was of Moravian descent. At one point, he noted that he was "born [a] Catholic and very puritan". Ultimately describing himself as an atheist, Lang believed that religion was important for teaching ethics.

After finishing school, Lang briefly attended the Technical University of Vienna, where he studied civil engineering and eventually switched to art. He left Vienna in 1910 to travel throughout Europe and Africa, later Asia and the Pacific area. In 1913, he studied painting in Paris. He was arrested by the French authorities as an "enemy alien", but escaped to Vienna, where he was drafted into the Imperial Austrian Army.

At the outbreak of World War I, Lang lived in the house of his parents in Gars am Kamp (both his parents are buried in Gars) in Lower Austria, where he used to paint. After this he returned to Vienna and volunteered for military service in the Austrian Army, fighting in Russia and Romania. Lang was wounded four times and lost sight in his right eye, when he then saw a Max Reinhardt show for injured soldiers and played in a Red Cross revue. For a short period of time he was also located in Ljutomer where he stayed with Karol Grossmann where he initially got interested in movies. During his convalescence he began writing plays and simple scenarios with Austrian film director Joe May devising a two-reel film from a Lang scenario. At the end of the war, Lang began to mingle with the demobilized Berlin artists and was discharged from the army with the rank of lieutenant in 1918. Lang briefly acted in the Viennese theater circuit before being hired as a writer at Decla Film, Erich Pommer's Berlin-based production company.

On 13 February 1919, in the Marriage Registry Office in Charlottenburg, Berlin, Lang married a theater actress named Elisabeth Rosenthal. Rosenthal died of a single gunshot wound in their bathtub on September 25, 1920, the shot deemed to have been fired from Lang's World War I Browning revolver. Lang and his future wife Harbou claimed that Rosenthal had shot herself, and Lang and Harbou were charged with failure to render aid. The charge was soon dropped.

== Career ==
=== Expressionist films: the Weimar years (1918–1933) ===
Lang started work as a director at the German film studio UFA, and later Nero-Film, just as the Expressionist movement was building. In this first phase of his career, Lang alternated between films such as Der Müde Tod ("The Weary Death") and popular thrillers such as Die Spinnen ("The Spiders"), combining popular genres with Expressionist techniques to create a synthesis of popular entertainment with art cinema.

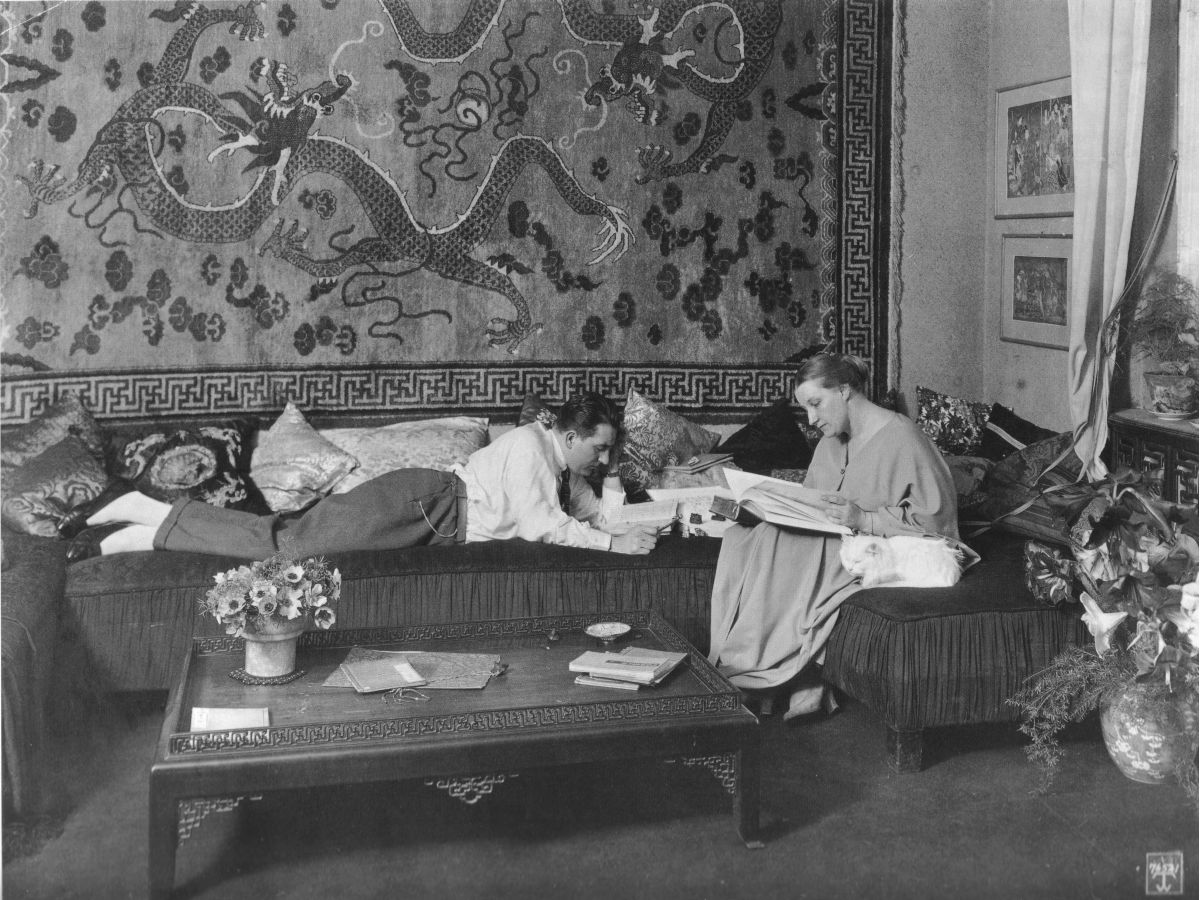
Lang and Thea von Harbou in their Berlin flat, 1923 or 1924

In 1920, Lang met his future second wife, the writer Thea von Harbou through director Joe May. Harbou co-wrote and directed the film Das wandernde Bild with Lang. She co-wrote every Harbou-Lang film till 1933, including Dr. Mabuse, der Spieler ("Dr. Mabuse the Gambler", 1922 – which ran for over four hours, in two parts in the original version, and was the first in the Dr. Mabuse trilogy), the five-hour Die Nibelungen (1924), the dystopian film Metropolis (1927), and the science fiction film Woman in the Moon (1929). Metropolis went over budget, to the UFA's detriment. It was a financial flop, as were his last silent films Spies (1928) and Woman in the Moon, produced by Lang's own company.

In 1931, independent producer Seymour Nebenzahl hired Lang to direct M for Nero-Film. His first "talking" picture, considered by many film scholars to be a masterpiece of the early sound era, M is a story of a child murderer (Peter Lorre in his first starring role) who is hunted down and brought to justice by Berlin's criminal underworld.

Lang was hard to work with. During the climactic final scene in M, Lang allegedly threw Peter Lorre down a flight of stairs in order to give more authenticity to Lorre's battered look.

In the films of his German period, Lang produced an oeuvre that established the characteristics later attributed to film noir, with its recurring themes of psychological conflict, paranoia, fate and moral ambiguity.

Lang started having an affair with the Austrian actress Gerda Maurus during the filming of Spione (1928).

At the end of 1932, Lang started filming The Testament of Dr. Mabuse. As Adolf Hitler came to power in January 1933, the new regime banned the film on March 30 as an incitement to public disorder. Testament is occasionally deemed an anti-Nazi film, as Lang had put Nazi phrases into the mouth of the title character. A screening of the film was cancelled by Joseph Goebbels, and it was later banned by the Reich Ministry of Public Enlightenment and Propaganda. In banning the film, Goebbels stated that the film "showed that an extremely dedicated group of people are perfectly capable of overthrowing any state with violence", and that the film posed a threat to public health and safety.

Throughout his marriage with von Harbou, Lang was known for being a philanderer. Two of his lovers of these years included Gerda Maurus, the leading actress in Lang's last silent films Spione (1928) and Woman in the Moon (1929), and Lily Latte in 1931. In the early 1930s, Harbou started an affair with Ayi Tendulkar, an Indian journalist and student 17 years her junior.

=== Emigration ===
According to Lang, propaganda minister Joseph Goebbels called Lang to his offices to inform him that The Testament of Dr. Mabuse was being banned but, nevertheless, he was so impressed by Lang's abilities as a filmmaker (especially Metropolis), that he offered Lang the position of head of German film studio UFA. Lang said it was during that meeting he had decided to leave for Paris – but that the banks had closed by the time the meeting was over. Lang claimed that, after selling his wife's jewelry, he fled by train to Paris that evening, leaving most of his money and personal possessions behind. Despite this, Lang's passport of the time showed that he traveled to and from Germany throughout 1933.

Lang left Berlin permanently on July 31, 1933, four months after his meeting with Goebbels and his initial departure. He moved to Paris, having divorced Thea von Harbou, who stayed behind, earlier in 1933.

In Paris, Lang filmed his only French film, a version of Ferenc Molnár's Liliom, starring Charles Boyer. He then moved to the United States.

=== Hollywood career (1936–1957) ===
Lang made twenty-two features in his 20-year American career, working in a variety of genres at every major studio in Hollywood, and occasionally producing his films as an independent. He became a naturalized citizen of the United States in 1939.

Signing first with MGM Studios, Lang's crime drama Fury (1936) saw Spencer Tracy cast as a man who is wrongly accused of a crime and nearly killed when a lynch mob sets fire to the jail where he is awaiting trial. However, in Fury, he was not allowed to represent black victims in a lynching scenario or to criticize racism, which was his original intention. By the time Fury was released, Lang had been involved in the creation of the Hollywood Anti-Nazi League, working with Otto Katz, a Czech Jew who was a Comintern spy. He made four films with explicitly anti-Nazi themes, Man Hunt (1941), Hangmen Also Die! (1943), Ministry of Fear (1944) and Cloak and Dagger (1946). Man Hunt, wrote Dave Kehr in 2009, "may be the best" of the "many interventionist films produced by the Hollywood studios before Pearl Harbor" as it is "clean and concentrated, elegant and precise, pointed without being preachy."

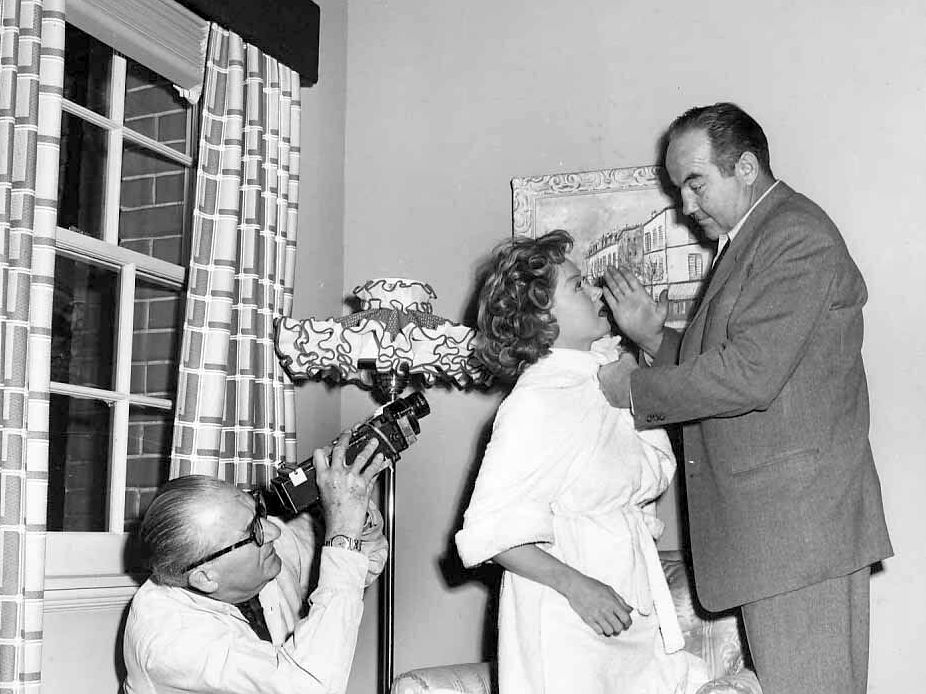
Lang with Gloria Grahame and Broderick Crawford on the set of Human Desire

His American films were often compared unfavorably to his earlier works by contemporary critics, although the restrained Expressionism of these films is now seen as integral to the emergence and evolution of American genre cinema. Scarlet Street (1945), one of his films featuring Edward G. Robinson and Joan Bennett, is considered a central film in the film noir genre.

One of Lang's most praised films noir is the police drama The Big Heat (1953), known for its brutality. As Lang's visual style simplified, in part due to the constraints of the Hollywood studio system, his worldview became increasingly pessimistic, culminating in the cold, geometric style of his last American films, While the City Sleeps (1956) and Beyond a Reasonable Doubt (1956).

=== Last films (1959–1963) ===
Lang, as his health worsened with age, found it difficult to find congenial production conditions and backers in Hollywood and contemplated retirement. The German producer Artur Brauner had expressed interest in remaking The Indian Tomb (from an original story by Thea von Harbou, that Lang had developed in the 1920s which had ultimately been directed by Joe May), so Lang returned to West Germany to make his "Indian Epic" (consisting of The Tiger of Eschnapur and The Indian Tomb).

Following the production, Brauner was preparing for a remake of The Testament of Dr. Mabuse when Lang approached him with the idea of adding a new original film to the series. The result was The Thousand Eyes of Dr. Mabuse (1960), whose success led to a series of new Mabuse films produced by Brauner (including the remake of The Testament of Dr. Mabuse), though Lang did not direct any of the sequels. Lang was approaching blindness during the production, and it was his final project as director.

In 1963, he appeared as himself in Jean-Luc Godard's film Contempt.

== Death and legacy ==
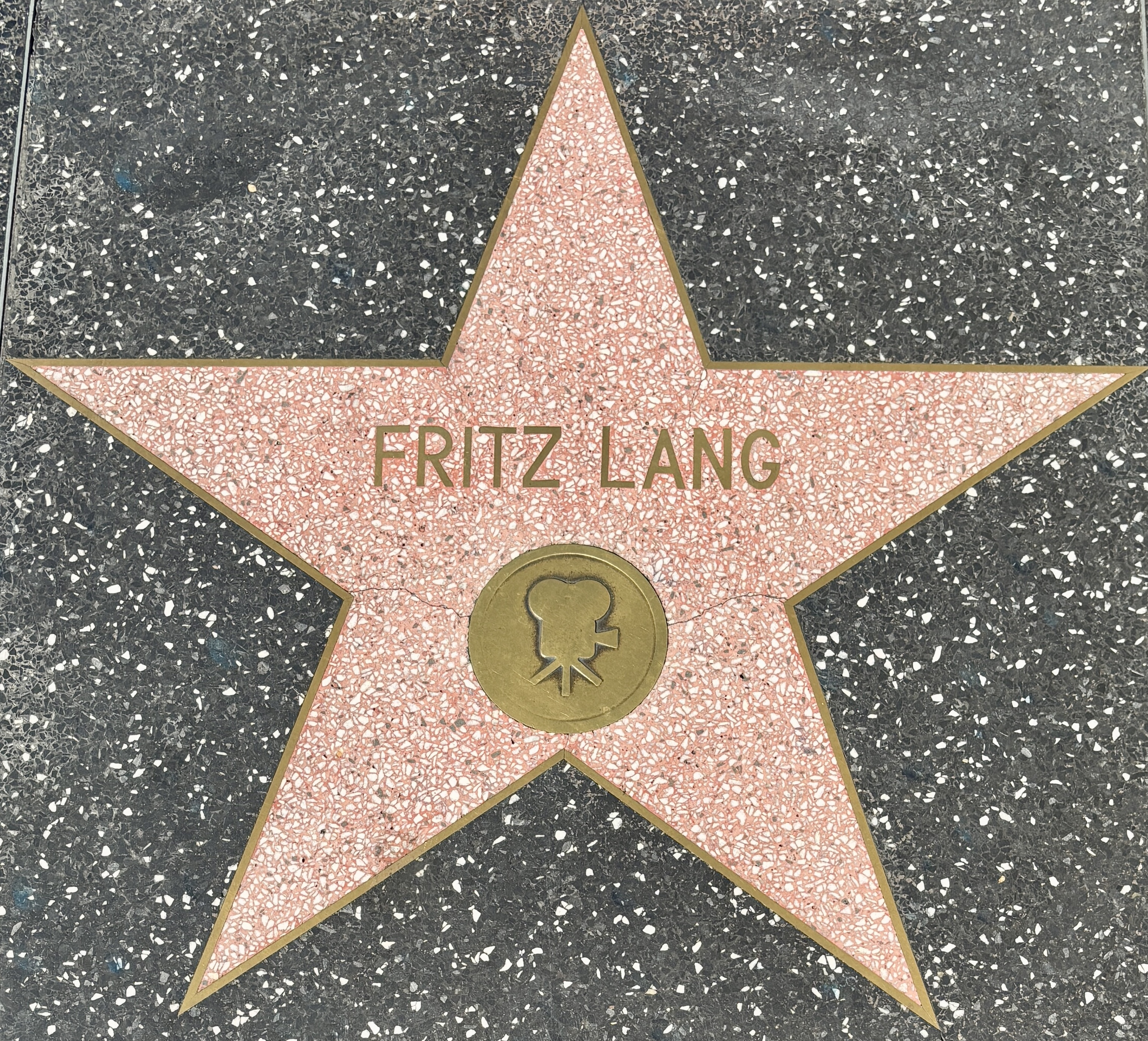
Hollywood Walk of Fame star

On February 8, 1960, Lang received a star on the Hollywood Walk of Fame for his contributions to the motion picture industry, located at 1600 Vine Street.

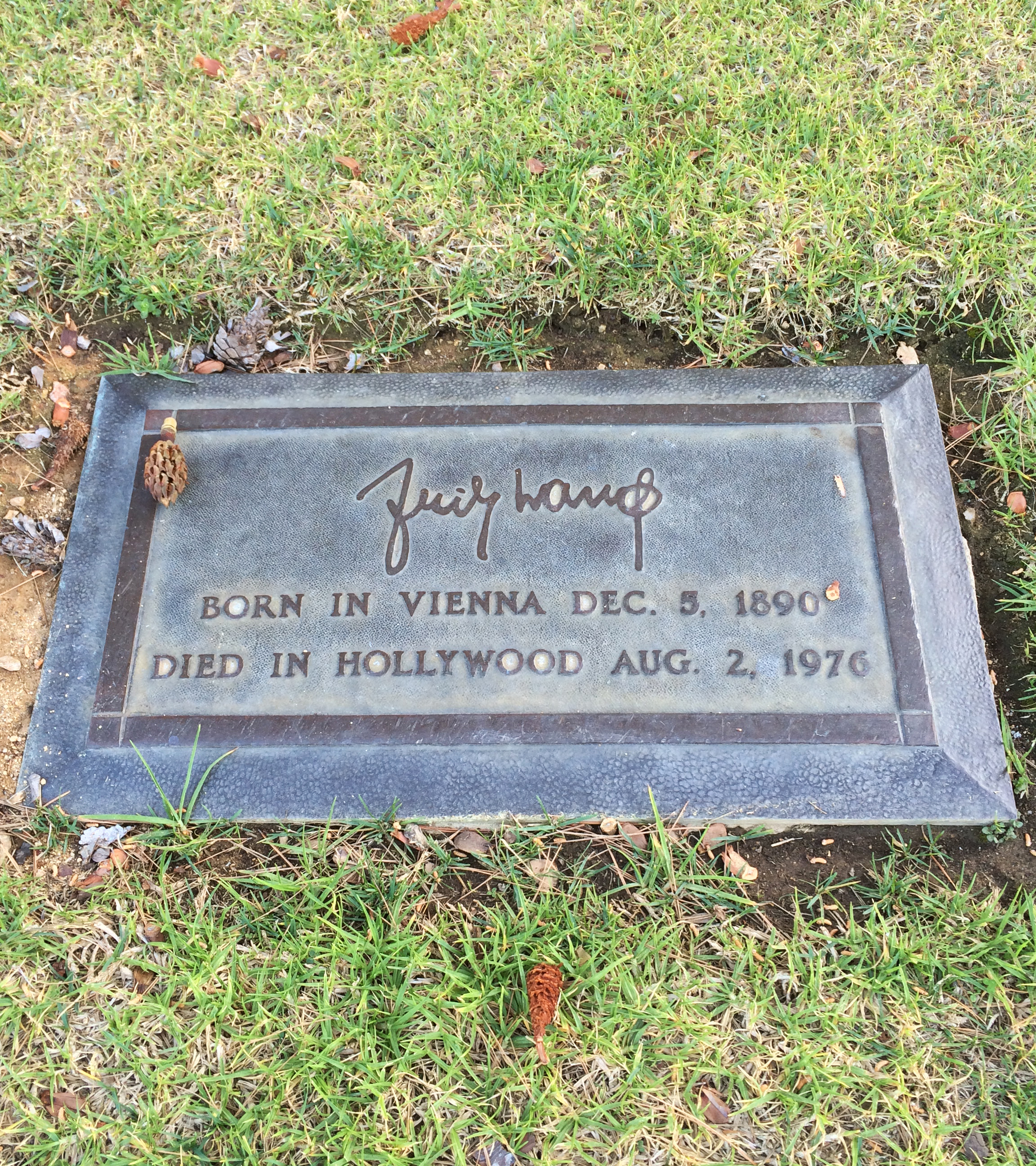
Grave of Lang, at Forest Lawn Hollywood Hills

Lang died from a stroke on August 2, 1976, and was interred in the Forest Lawn Hollywood Hills Cemetery in the Hollywood Hills of Los Angeles.

Lang's American and later German works were championed by the critics of the Cahiers du cinéma, such as François Truffaut and Jacques Rivette. Truffaut wrote that Lang, especially in his American career, was greatly underappreciated by "cinema historians and critics" who "deny him any genius when he 'signs' spy movies ... war movies ... or simple thrillers."

Lang is credited with launching or developing many different genres of film. Philip French of The Observer believed that Lang helped craft the "entertainment war flick" and that his interpretation of the story of Bonnie and Clyde "helped launch the Hollywood film noir". Geoff Andrew of the British Film Institute believed he set the "blueprint for the serial killer movie" through M.

In December 2021, Lang was the subject for BBC Radio 4's In Our Time.

=== Preservation ===
The Academy Film Archive has preserved a number of Lang's films, including Human Desire and Man Hunt.

== Awards ==
- Silver Hand in 1931, for his film M, by the German Motion Picture Arts Association
- Commander Cross, Order of Merit in 1957 and 1966
- Golden Ribbon of Motion Picture Arts in 1963 by the Federal Republic of Germany
- Order of Arts and Letters from France in 1965
- Plaque from El Festival Internacional del Cine de San Sebastian in 1970
- Order of the Yugoslavia Flag with a Golden Wreath in 1971
- Honorary Professor of Fine Arts by the University of Vienna, Austria, in 1973
