= Wibbel the Tailor =

Wibbel the Tailor (German:Schneider Wibbel) may refer to:

- Wibbel the Tailor (play), a 1913 play by Hans Müller-Schlösser
- Wibbel the Tailor (opera), a 1938 work by Mark Lothar
- Wibbel the Tailor (1920 film), a German silent film directed by Manfred Noa
- Wibbel the Tailor (1931 film), a German film directed by Paul Henckels
- Wibbel the Tailor (1939 film), a German film directed by Viktor de Kowa
