= Tzatschewa =

Tzatschewa is a surname. Notable people with the surname include:

- Manja Tzatschewa (1897–1966), Bulgarian actress
- Tzwetta Tzatschewa (1900–1975), Bulgarian actress
