= The Testament of Joe Sivers =

1922 film

- Directed by: Conrad Wiene
- Written by: Meta Schoepp (novel Millionensegen)
- Produced by: Franz Vogel
- Starring: Hans Albers; Karl Falkenberg; Hildegard Imhof
- Production company: Eiko Film
- Release date: August 1922
- Country: Germany
- Languages: Silent; German intertitles

The Testament of Joe Sivers (German: Das Testament des Joe Sivers) is a 1922 German silent film directed by Conrad Wiene and starring Hans Albers, Karl Falkenberg, and Hildegard Imhof.

The film's sets were designed by the art director Karl Machus.

== Cast ==
In alphabetical order

- Hans Albers
- Karl Falkenberg
- Hildegard Imhof
- Friedrich Kühne
- Mara Markow
- Hans Steinbeck
- Sacy von Blondel

== Bibliography ==
- Hans-Michael Bock and Tim Bergfelder. The Concise Cinegraph: An Encyclopedia of German Cinema. Berghahn Books, 2009.
