= Intermezzo (1936 German film) =

1936 film

- Directed by: Josef von Báky
- Written by: Karl Peter Gillmann
- Starring: Tresi Rudolph; Albrecht Schoenhals; Franz Weber
- Cinematography: Ewald Daub; Hugo von Kaweczynski
- Edited by: Willy Zeyn
- Music by: Theo Mackeben
- Production company: Majestic Film
- Distributed by: Tobis Film
- Release date: 3 November 1936
- Running time: 94 minutes
- Country: Germany
- Language: German

Intermezzo is a 1936 German musical comedy film directed by Josef von Báky and starring Tresi Rudolph, Albrecht Schoenhals and Franz Weber. It is part of the tradition of operetta films and is not linked to the 1936 Swedish film of the same title. It was shot at the Johannisthal Studios in Berlin and on location around Biarritz on the Bay of Biscay. The film's sets were designed by the art directors Karl Weber and Erich Zander.

== Synopsis ==
The singer Adrienne flees from her long-time fiancée Pierre when he demands that she should give up her opera career. In the resort town of Biarritz she loses a fortune in the casino, but is assisted by a man named Trent. She believes that Trent is a wealthy benefactor, but he in fact a composer. Circumstances end up with her singing in his new opera in Paris.

== Cast ==
- Tresi Rudolph as Adrienne Madelon
- Albrecht Schoenhals as Trent
- Franz Weber as Jean Cukler
- Erich Fiedler as Pierre Cukler
- Rudolf Schündler as Rundfunk-Reporter
- Ernst Legal as Ballon
- S.O. Schoening as Martinetti
- Kurt Seifert as Don Ramiro
- Henry Lorenzen as Billie - Chauffeur
- Hilde Sessak as Blanche - Zofe
- Rudolf Klein-Rogge as Ponbiquet
- Hansi Arnstaedt as Jean Cukler's Wife

== Bibliography ==
- Bock, Hans-Michael. Die Tobis 1928-1945: eine kommentierte Filmografie. Edition Text + Kritik, 2003.
- Elsaesser, Thomas & Wedel, Michael. The BFI companion to German cinema. British Film Institute, 1999.
- Klaus, Ulrich J. Deutsche Tonfilme: Jahrgang 1936. Klaus-Archiv, 1988.
- Waldman, Harry. Nazi Films in America, 1933-1942. McFarland, 2008.
