= The Adventures of Captain Hansen =

1917 film

- Directed by: Harry Piel
- Written by: Harry Piel
- Produced by: Franz Vogel
- Cinematography: Eugen Hamm
- Production company: Eiko Film
- Release date: December 1917
- Country: Germany
- Languages: Silent; German intertitles

The Adventures of Captain Hansen (German: Die Abenteuer des Kapitän Hansen) is a 1917 German silent film directed by Harry Piel.

== Cast ==
- Tilli Bébé
- Bruno Eichgrün
- Lu Synd
- Aruth Wartan

== Bibliography ==
- Bleckman, Matias (1992). Harry Piel: ein Kino-Mythos und seine Zeit. Filminstitut der Landeshaupstadt Düsseldorf. ISBN 978-3-929098-01-3.
