= The Yellow Flag =

1937 German drama film

- Directed by: Gerhard Lamprecht
- Written by: Fred Andreas (novel); Helmut Brandis; Otto Linnekogel
- Produced by: Franz Vogel
- Starring: Hans Albers; Olga Chekhova; Dorothea Wieck
- Cinematography: Franz Koch
- Edited by: Fritz C. Mauch
- Music by: Giuseppe Becce
- Production company: Euphono-Film
- Distributed by: Panorama-Film
- Release date: 12 October 1937
- Running time: 93 minutes
- Country: Germany
- Language: German

The Yellow Flag (German: Die gelbe Flagge) is a 1937 German drama film directed by Gerhard Lamprecht and starring Hans Albers, Olga Chekhova and Dorothea Wieck. It was shot at the Babelsberg Studios in Berlin. The film's sets were designed by the art director Ludwig Reiber. Location filming took place in Yugoslavia.

== Synopsis ==
An adventurer, Peter Diercksen, travels to South America to guide an expedition into the jungle. However, when the ship is quarantined he believes he has contracted a serious fever. He does not accompany the trip, which runs into major problems. Later he is able to go to the rescue of the survivors including the American journalist Helen Roeder whom he is in love with.

== Cast ==
- Hans Albers as Peter Diercksen - ehemaliger Flieger
- Olga Chekhova as Helen Roeder - amerikanische Journalistin
- Dorothea Wieck as Krankenschwester Dolores
- Gotthart Portloff as Alfred Gesekius - Plantagenbesitzer
- Rudolf Klein-Rogge as Kapitän Ellis
- Arthur Schröder as Benthley, Erster Offizier
- Herbert Gernot as Dr. Rusby, Arzt
- Heinz Evelt as Tobi, Steward
- Aribert Wäscher as Ramón Orveda - Kommandant Quarantäne-Station
- Alexander Engel as Dr. Martinez - Arzt - Quarantäne-Station
- Hugo Werner-Kahle as Dr. Perez, Vertrauensarzt der Regierung
- Erwin Klietsch as Professor Cameron - Expeditionsleiter
- Kurt Hinz as Dr. MacHugh - sein Assistenz
- Hans Adalbert Schlettow as Major Bachmair - Kommandant Hilfsexpedition
- Lissy Arna as Halbweltdame Pandorita
- Margit Symo as Halbweltdame Lu
- Else Ehser as Gloria Sanders
- Jutta Jol as Ines - Krankenschwester
- Karl Hannemann as Hotelportier
- Manfred Meurer as Sergeant Rossi
- S.O. Schoening as Dietrichsen
- Otto Stoeckel as Arzt
- Albert Venohr as Mann in der Tingel-Tangel-Bar
- Elisabeth Miller as Telefonierende Dame
- Angelo Ferrari as Begleiter der telefonierenden Dame
- Bruno Karl as Naturbursche
- Livia Stolp as Junge Frau
- Max Harry Ernst as Schiffspassagier
- Jac Diehl as Soldat
- Kurt Mikulski as Tavernenwirt
- Lilo Bergen as Junge Frau
- Kurt Bobeth-Bolander as Barmann
- Walter Brückner
- Gerda Dietel
- Liesl Eckardt as Köchin
- Inge Felix
- Paul Ludwig Frey
- Hella Gantzert as Mexikanische Magd
- Claire Glib as Schiffspassagierin
- Wolf Harro as Junger Soldat
- Kurt Iller
- Karl Jüstel
- Alfred Karen as Schiffspassagier
- Carl Krenzer
- Viggo Larsen as Mexikanischer Ständchensänger
- Adelberg Ludwigshausen as Älterer Soldat
- Edgar Pauly
- Hermann Pfeiffer as Spielkasinodirektor
- Theodor Popp as Schiffssteward
- Joachim Rake as Junger Soldat
- Ludwig Schwarz as Zweifelhafter Kavalier
- Friedrich Teitge as Schiffspassagier
- Robert Vincenti-Lieffertz as Spieler und Zuschauer am Spieltisch
- Martha von Konssatzki
- Erik von Loewis as Schiffssteward

== Bibliography ==
- Rentschler, Eric. The Ministry of Illusion: Nazi Cinema and Its Afterlife. Harvard University Press, 1996.
