= Manja Tzatschewa =

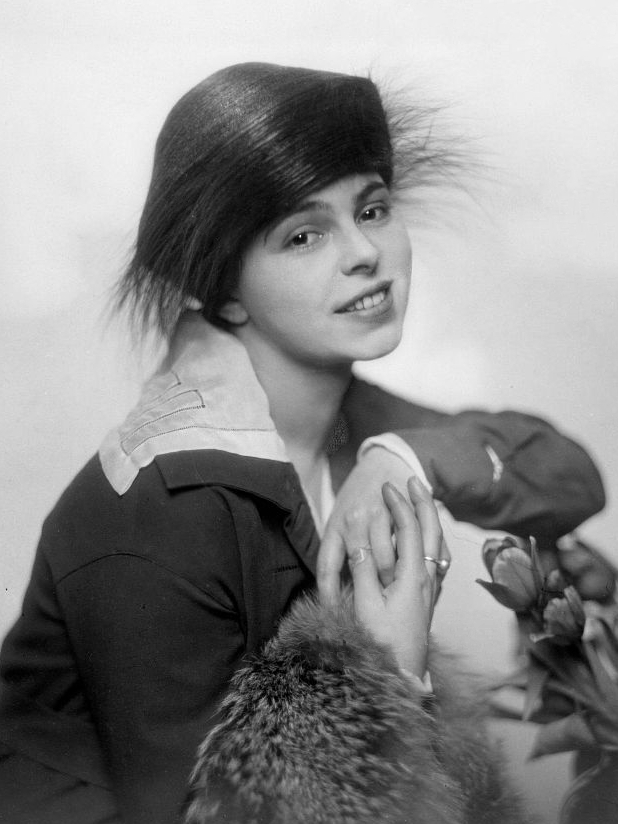
- Tzatschewa in 1919
- Born: Maria Trifonova Tzatschewa; February 10, 1897; Lovech, Bulgaria
- Died: 1966 (aged 68–69); France
- Occupation: Actress
- Years active: 1917–1926

Manja Tzatschewa (Bulgarian: Маня Цанчева) (February 10, 1897 – circa 1966) was a Bulgarian-born actress, who starred in many German silent films during the 1920s.

== Biography ==
Maria Trifonova Tzatschewa (Bulgarian: Мария Трифонова Цачева) was born on February 10, 1897, in Lovech, Bulgaria.

In 1918, she played the Chinese girl Nang Ping in the film Mr. Wu, directed by Lupu Pick. The following year she starred opposite Conrad Veidt and Max Landa in The Japanese Woman. Her first major motion picture role was in The Pearl of the Orient in 1921.

She was married to German director Manfred Noa. Her younger sister Tzwetta Tzatschewa was also an actress, working in German cinema. Manja Tzatschewa died in 1966.

== Filmography ==
- 1926 Annemarie und ihr Ulan
- 1925 – 1926 Der Rebell von Valencia
- 1925 Briefe, die ihn nicht erreichten
- 1924 Der Mönch von Santarem
- 1922 Man soll es nicht für möglich halten oder Maciste und die Javanerin
- 1922 Die Fürstin der Ozeanwerft
- 1921 Der schwere Junge
- 1921 Söhne der Nacht. 2. Die Macht der Liebe
- 1921 Der Schatten der Gaby Leed
- 1921 Die Perle des Orients
- 1921 Söhne der Nacht. 1. Die Verbrecher-GmbH
- 1920 – 1921 Der Sprung über den Schatten
- 1920 – 1921 Der Mann mit den eisernen Nerven
- 1920 – 1921 Die goldene Flut
- 1920 – 1921 Gelbe Bestien
- 1920 – 1921 Der Kaiser der Sahara
- 1920 – 1921 Der Millionendieb
- 1920 – 1921 Schieber
- 1920 Berlin W
- 1920 Die sieben Todsünden
- 1920 Frauenliebe. Mosaik, aus drei Steinbildern zusammengesetzt
- 1920 Götzendämmerung. Opfer der Keuschheit
- 1919 – 1920 Die Menschen nennen es Liebe
- 1919 – 1920 Haß
- 1919 Opfer der Schmach (Die rote Laterne)
- 1919 Moderne Töchter
- 1919 Liebe
- 1918 – 1919 Die Japanerin
- 1918 – 1919 Mein Wille ist Gesetz
- 1918 Der Teufel
- 1918 Madame d'Ora
- 1918 Mr. Wu
- 1918 Der lebende Leichnam
- 1918 Die seltsame Geschichte des Baron Torelli
- 1917 – 1918 Die sterbenden Perlen
