= Wibbel the Tailor (1920 film) =

1920 film directed by Manfred Noa

- Directed by: Manfred Noa
- Written by: Hans Müller-Schlösser (play); Georg Jacoby; Léo Lasko
- Produced by: Franz Vogel
- Starring: Hermann Picha; Margarete Kupfer; Meinhart Maur; Wilhelm Diegelmann
- Cinematography: Paul Adler
- Production company: Eiko Film
- Distributed by: Eiko Film
- Release date: 23 April 1920
- Country: Germany
- Languages: Silent; German intertitles

Wibbel the Tailor (German: Schneider Wibbel) is a 1920 German silent comedy film directed by Manfred Noa and starring Hermann Picha, Margarete Kupfer and Meinhart Maur. It is an adaptation of the 1913 play Wibbel the Tailor by Hans Müller-Schlösser. It was made by Eiko Film and shot at the Marienfelde Studios in Berlin. The film's art direction is by Karl Machus.

== Cast ==
- Hermann Picha as Schneider Wibbel
- Margarete Kupfer as Wibbels Frau
- Meinhart Maur as Gefängnisschliesser
- Gustav Trautschold as Gehilfen
- Wilhelm Diegelmann
- Christian Elfeld
- Loo Hardy
- Emil Stammer

== Bibliography ==
- Usai, Paolo Cherchi. Before Caligari: German cinema, 1895-1920. University of Wisconsin Press, 1991.
