= Hate (film) =

1920 film by Manfred Noa

- Directed by: Manfred Noa
- Written by: Margarete-Maria Langen
- Produced by: Franz Vogel
- Starring: Tzwetta Tzatschewa; Ernst Deutsch; Rudolf Lettinger
- Production company: Eiko-Film
- Release date: January 1920
- Country: Germany
- Languages: Silent; German intertitles

Hate (German: Haß) is a 1920 German silent drama film directed by Manfred Noa and starring Tzwetta Tzatschewa, Ernst Deutsch and Rudolf Lettinger.

The film's sets were designed by the art director Karl Machus.

== Cast ==
- Tzwetta Tzatschewa
- Ernst Deutsch
- Rudolf Lettinger
- Loo Hardy
- Sent Mahesa
- Henri Peters-Arnolds

== Bibliography ==
- Bock, Hans-Michael & Bergfelder, Tim. The Concise CineGraph. Encyclopedia of German Cinema. Berghahn Books, 2009.
