= The Queen of Sparta =

1931 film directed by Manfred Noa

- Directed by: Manfred Noa
- Production company: Itala Film
- Release date: 22 February 1931
- Language: Italian

The Queen of Sparta (Italian: La regina di Sparta) is a 1931 film directed by Manfred Noa and starring Antonio Moray, Viola LaRosa and Franco Faris. The film was made by the low-budget Itala Film in Hollywood, primarily for release in Italian-speaking inhabitants of the United States. Shot as a silent with sound added later, it re-used footage from Noa's 1924 film Helen of Troy.

Its complex background has led to it being classified variously as an American, German or Italian film.

== Cast ==
- Antonio Moray as Priam
- Viola LaRosa as Helen
- Franco Faris as Paris
- Bernardo Camilli
- Giuseppe Laroy
- Carlo Borelli
- Pietro Costo

== Bibliography ==
- Winkler, Martin M (ed.). Troy: From Homer's Iliad to Hollywood Epic. John Wiley & Sons, 2009.
- Pantelis Michelakis & Maria Wyke. The Ancient World in Silent Cinema. Cambridge University Press, 2013.
