= Revolutionary Wedding =

1938 film

- Directed by: Hans H. Zerlett
- Written by: Hans H. Zerlett
- Based on: Revolutionsbryllup by Sophus Michaëlis
- Produced by: Franz Vogel
- Starring: Brigitte Horney; Friedrich Benfer; Paul Hartmann
- Cinematography: Georg Krause
- Edited by: Ella Ensink
- Music by: Walter Gronostay
- Production company: Euphono-Film
- Distributed by: Terra Film
- Release date: 7 March 1938
- Running time: 86 minutes
- Country: Germany
- Language: German

Revolutionary Wedding (German: Revolutionshochzeit) is a 1938 German historical drama film directed by Hans H. Zerlett and starring Brigitte Horney, Friedrich Benfer and Paul Hartmann. It was shot at the Berlin studios of Carl Froelich and on location around Brandenburg. The film's sets were designed by the art director Karl Machus.

== Synopsis ==
In 1793 during the Reign of Terror of the French Revolution, the aristocrat Aline has just married her cousin Ernest when he is arrested and taken away by the Jacobins. Their zealous leader Montaloup immediately has him sentenced to death. A desperate Aline approached an army officer Marc-Arron and he gets a twelve hour stay of execution for her husband. She then offers to spend the night with him if he will let her husband escape. He agrees and facilitates Ernest's escape by swapping his own uniform for his prison clothes, but she soon realises he is an honourable man who has no intention of taking advantage of her. Conversely she is struck by the cowardice of Ernest who has fled to safety abroad. When Marc-Arron is arrested in the morning for treason and himself sentenced to death, she chooses to join him in front of the firing squad.

== Cast ==
- Brigitte Horney as Aline
- Friedrich Benfer as Ernest
- Paul Hartmann as Marc Arron
- Bernhard Minetti as Montaloup
- Hugo Gau-Hamm as General Davout
- Carla Rust as Leontine
- Peter Elsholtz as Prosper
- Heinz Welzel as Jean Lasque
- Eva Tinschmann as Jeanette
- Ernst Albert Schaach as Jerome
- Franz Lichtenauer as Pierre
- Erwin Biegel as Soldat Biron

== Bibliography ==
- Fox, Jo. Filming Women in the Third Reich. Bloomsbury Academic, 2000.
- Klaus, Ulrich J. Deutsche Tonfilme: Jahrgang 1938. Klaus-Archiv, 1988.
