= Dance Music (film) =

1935 film

- Directed by: Johann Alexander Hübler-Kahla
- Written by: Max Niederberger; Maria Stephan
- Produced by: Leopold Meissner
- Starring: Liane Haid; Gusti Huber; Hermann Thimig; Leo Slezak
- Cinematography: Georg Muschner; Paul Rischke
- Edited by: Putty Krafft
- Music by: Max Niederberger
- Production company: Pan Film
- Distributed by: Kiba Kinobetriebsanstalt
- Release date: 14 August 1935
- Running time: 82 minutes
- Country: Austria
- Language: German

Dance Music (German: Tanzmusik) is a 1935 Austrian drama film directed by Johann Alexander Hübler-Kahla and starring Liane Haid, Gusti Huber and Hermann Thimig.

== Cast ==
- Liane Haid as Gina Harding
- Gusti Huber as Hedi Baumann
- Hermann Thimig as Mario d'Almeida
- Leo Slezak as Koppler, Inhaber einer Konzertagentur
- Georg Alexander as Bob Crawler
- Hans Thimig as Franz Hegner
- Rudolf Carl as Jim, Diener d'Almeides
- Ferdinand Mayerhofer as Baumann, Weinhändler
- Eduard Loibner as Ein Manager
- Richard Eybner as Inhaber einer Tanzschule

== Bibliography ==
- Waldman, Harry. Nazi Films In America, 1933-1942. McFarland & Co, 2008.
