= That Won't Keep a Sailor Down =

1958 film directed by Arthur Maria Rabenalt

- Film poster
- German: Das haut einen Seemann doch nicht um
- Directed by: Arthur Maria Rabenalt
- Written by: Grete Frische; F. M. Schilder
- Produced by: Preben Philipsen
- Starring: Karlheinz Böhm; Antje Geerk; Georg Thomalla
- Cinematography: Albert Benitz
- Edited by: Anker Sørensen
- Music by: Bert Grund
- Production company: Rialto Film
- Distributed by: Prisma Film
- Release date: 19 September 1958
- Running time: 94 minutes
- Countries: West Germany; Denmark
- Language: German

That Won't Keep a Sailor Down (German: Das haut einen Seemann doch nicht um) is a 1958 German-Danish comedy-drama film directed by Arthur Maria Rabenalt and starring Karlheinz Böhm, Antje Geerk and Georg Thomalla. It was entered into the 1st Moscow International Film Festival.

== Plot ==
After returning to Copenhagen, a sailor learns that his wife died a few days ago shortly after giving birth. He now tries to bring up the child, with the help of a young woman he has met.

== Cast ==
- Karlheinz Böhm as Peter Hille
- Antje Geerk as Christine Hansen
- Georg Thomalla as Valdemar V. Olsen
- Annie Rosar as Frau Nielsen
- Hans Nielsen as Pastor Paulsen
- Irene Mann as Paula
- Willy Maertens as Herr Nielsen
- Gerd Frickhöffer as Hermann
- Eddi Arent as Kalle, a Sailor
- Johannes Meyer as Waiter
