= Meta Seinemeyer =

German opera singer

Meta Seinemeyer (September 5, 1895 – August 19, 1929) was a German opera singer with a spinto soprano voice.

Seinemeyer was born in Berlin, where she studied at the Stern Conservatory with Ernst Grenzebach. She made her debut at the Deutsche Opernhaus in 1918. She joined the Dresden Semperoper in 1924, and began appearing at the Vienna State Opera in 1927.

On the international scene, she sang at the Teatro Colón in Buenos Aires, as Agathe in Der Freischütz, Sieglinde in Die Walküre, Elisabeth in Tannhäuser and Eva in Die Meistersinger von Nürnberg in 1926, and at the Royal Opera House in London in 1929, as Eva, Elsa in Lohengrin and Sieglinde.

Besides the great Wagner heroines, she also played an important role in the renaissance of Verdi's operas in Germany, winning considerable acclaim as Leonora in La forza del destino, Elisabeth de Valois in Don Carlos, and the title role in Aida. She was also admired as Marguerite in Faust, Maddalena in Andrea Chénier, and the title role in Tosca.

She took part in the creation of Busoni's Doktor Faust in Dresden in 1925.

Her voice is notable for her flawless management of register breaks, resulting in a seamless stream of tone from top to bottom. The voice has a very rich, enveloping sound, discernable even despite the limitations of the extant acoustic recordings. In some of these she partners the tenor Tino Pattiera, with whom she often appeared on stage.

One of the greatest German singers of her generation, her career was cut short when she died of leukemia in Dresden a few weeks short of her 34th birthday. Very shortly before her death, she married the conductor Frieder Weissmann(1893–1984). She is buried at the Stahnsdorf South-Western Cemetery close to Berlin.

== Recordings ==
Seinemeyer made 106 recordings. Preiser issued a four CD collection entitled The Art of Meta Seinemeyer (89402). Other CD compilations include:

- The Art of Meta Seinemeyer Dutton CDBP 9770
- Meta Seinemeyer Hamburger Archiv für Gesangskunst 10228
- Meta Seinemeyer Pearl GEMM CD 9082
- Meta Seinemeyer Preiser 89029
- Meta Seinemeyer. Ses rôles italiens 1926 à 1928. LYS 439
- Meta Seinemeyer sings Puccini, Verdi, Giordano and Wagner Haenssler Classic 94.511
