= Across the Desert =

1936 film

- Directed by: Johann Alexander Hübler-Kahla
- Written by: Karl May (novel); Carl Junghans
- Produced by: Lothar Stark
- Starring: Fred Raupach; Heinz Evelt; Erich Haußmann; Aruth Wartan
- Cinematography: Georg Muschner; Paul Rischke
- Music by: Gottfried Huppertz
- Production company: Lothar Stark-Film
- Distributed by: NDLS
- Release date: 20 February 1936
- Running time: 88 minutes
- Country: Germany
- Language: German

Across the Desert (German: Durch die Wüste) is a 1936 German adventure film directed by Johann Alexander Hübler-Kahla and starring Fred Raupach, Heinz Evelt and Aruth Wartan. It was based on a novel by Karl May. It was the first sound adaptation of a May novel, and the only one to be produced during the Nazi era. Set in the Ottoman Empire during the nineteenth century, it portrays a series of oriental adventures of travellers Kara Ben Nemsi and Hadschi Halef Omar.

It was shot on location in Egypt, and at the Johannisthal Studios in Berlin.

== Cast ==
- Fred Raupach as Kara Ben Nemsi
- Heinz Evelt as Hadschi Halef Omar
- Erich Haußmann as Abu Seif
- Gretl Wawra as Hanneh
- Aruth Wartan as Scheik Malek
- Katharina Berger as Senitza
- Herbert Gernot as Abu Seif's butler
- Franz Klebusch as Plaza men
- Bertold Reissig as Abu Seif's friend

== Bibliography ==
- Bergfelder, Tim (2005). International Adventures: German Popular Cinema and European Co-productions in the 1960s. Berghahn Books. ISBN 978-1-57181-539-2.
