= The Girl and the Men =

- Directed by: Manfred Noa
- Written by: Margarete-Maria Langen
- Produced by: Franz Vogel
- Starring: Paul Hartmann; Werner Krauss; Reinhold Schünzel
- Production company: Eiko Film
- Distributed by: Eiko Film
- Release date: April 1919
- Country: Germany
- Languages: Silent; German intertitles

The Girl and the Men (German: Das Mädchen und die Männer) is a 1919 German silent film directed by Manfred Noa and starring Paul Hartmann, Werner Krauss and Reinhold Schünzel.

== Cast ==
In alphabetical order

- Hanne Brinkmann
- Else Bäck
- Alexander Ekert
- Paul Hartmann
- Werner Krauss
- Reinhold Schünzel
- Ferry Sikla
- Jan von Hagen

== Bibliography ==
- Bock, Hans-Michael & Bergfelder, Tim. The Concise CineGraph. Encyclopedia of German Cinema. Berghahn Books, 2009.
