= The Violet of Potsdamer Platz =

- Directed by: Johann Alexander Hübler-Kahla
- Written by: Otto Ernst Hesse; Bobby E. Lüthge; Helena von Fortenbach
- Produced by: Lothar Stark
- Starring: Rotraut Richter; Margarete Kupfer; Else Elster
- Cinematography: Georg Muschner; Paul Rischke
- Edited by: Walter Wischniewsky
- Music by: Jim Cowler
- Production company: Lothar Stark-Film
- Distributed by: NDLS
- Release date: 16 November 1936
- Running time: 89 minutes
- Country: Germany
- Language: German

The Violet of Potsdamer Platz (German: Das Veilchen vom Potsdamer Platz) is a 1936 German drama film directed by Johann Alexander Hübler-Kahla and starring Rotraut Richter, Margarete Kupfer and Else Elster. It was shot at the Marienfelde Studios in Berlin. The film's sets were designed by the art directors Gustav A. Knauer and Alexander Mügge.

== Synopsis ==
In Berlin, an old cavalry horse from the First World War is threatened with slaughter. A young flower seller from Potsdamer Platz attempts to save it with the assistance of her grandfather and other well-meaning people.

== Cast ==
- Rotraut Richter as Mariechen Bindedraht
- Paul W. Krüger as Vater Pietsch - Droschkenkutscher
- Margarete Kupfer as Mutter Pietsch
- Else Elster as Rosa - ihre Enkelin
- Fritz Kampers as Otto Schnöcker
- Anton Pointner as Seidewind
- Paul Westermeier as Knallkopp
- Hermann Schomberg as Schupo Lemke
- Hans Richter as Fritz
- Alfred Beierle as Held - Geldverleiher
- Otto Kronburger as Hansen - Kriminalrat
- Lotte Werkmeister as Blumenfrau

== See also ==
- List of films about horses

== Bibliography ==
- Klaus, Ulrich J. Deutsche Tonfilme: Jahrgang 1936. Klaus-Archiv, 1988.
- Rentschler, Eric. The Ministry of Illusion: Nazi Cinema and Its Afterlife. Harvard University Press, 1996.
