= Fritz C. Mauch =

German film editor and assistant director

- Occupations: Editor, Assistant Director
- Years active: 1934–1940 (film)

Fritz Christian Mauch (1905–1940) was a German film editor and assistant director. He also co-directed the 1938 documentary film España heroica about the Spanish Civil War.

== Selected filmography ==
=== Editor ===
- I Marry My Wife (1934)
- The Brenken Case (1934)
- Elisabeth and the Fool (1934)
- Every Day Isn't Sunday (1935)
- The Hour of Temptation (1936)
- The Impossible Woman (1936)
- The Yellow Flag (1937)
- The Gambler (1938)

== Bibliography ==
- Noël Maureen Valis. Teaching Representations of the Spanish Civil War. Modern Language Association of America, 2007.
