= Ernst Grenzebach =

German baritone

Ernst Grenzebach (14 February 1871 – 29 May 1936) was a German concert baritone and voice teacher. He taught, among others, two of the most famous European heroic tenors: Max Lorenz and Lauritz Melchior.

== Life and career ==
Born in Berlin, Grenzebach was the son of a Berlin merchant. From 1900 to 1904 he studied opera and concert singing at the Stern Conservatory. He also studied with the legendary baritone and teacher Antonio Cotogni, according to Shirlee Emmons in her Melchior biography Tristanissimo (1990). Although he was also active as a concert soloist, from 1904 he devoted himself primarily to teaching. He conducted the Grenzebach'sche Frauenchor which consisted of his students. In the 1920s he lived in Nassauische Strasse in Berlin-Wilmersdorf. He was the principal teacher of opera and concert singing at the Klindworth-Scharwenka-Konservatorium, which for decades enjoyed the reputation of an internationally renowned training institution. He was regarded as the vocal pedagogue of Berlin and was a professor at the Staatliche Hochschule für Musik und Darstellende Kunst Berlin from 1928 to 1934. Else Prausnitz (1885-1976) was the piano accompanist during his lessons for many years.

The later record producer, manager and composer Herbert Grenzebach (1897–1992) was his nephew whose musical education was supported by his uncle.

Grenzebach died in Berlin aged 65.

== Students ==
- Peter Anders
- Carl Braun
- Carl Clewing
- Keith Falkner
- Alexander Kipnis
- Max Lorenz
- Ludwig Hofmann
- Lauritz Melchior
- Paul Schöffler
- Rut Berglund
- Anny Helm
- Tresi Rudolph
- Meta Seinemeyer
- Hatsue Yuasa

== Literature ==
- Karl-Josef Kutsch, Leo Riemens: Großes Sängerlexikon. Fourth, extended and updated edition. K. G. Saur, Munich 2003, vol. 4. p. 1827
