= Wibbel the Tailor (1939 film) =

1939 film

- Directed by: Viktor de Kowa
- Written by: Hans Müller-Schlösser (play); Helmut Käutner; Bobby E. Lüthge
- Starring: Erich Ponto; Fita Benkhoff; Irene von Meyendorff; Friedrich Benfer
- Cinematography: Friedl Behn-Grund
- Edited by: René Métain
- Music by: Clemens Schmalstich
- Production company: Majestic-Film
- Distributed by: Tobis Film
- Release date: 18 August 1939
- Running time: 75 minutes
- Country: Germany
- Language: German

Wibbel the Tailor (German: Schneider Wibbel) is a 1939 German historical comedy film directed by Viktor de Kowa and starring Erich Ponto, Fita Benkhoff and Irene von Meyendorff. It is an adaptation of the 1913 play Wibbel the Tailor by Hans Müller-Schlösser. It is set in Düsseldorf during its occupation by French troops during the Napoleonic Wars (1803-1815).

== Cast ==
- Erich Ponto as Anton Wibbel the tailor
- Fita Benkhoff as Fin, his wife
- Irene von Meyendorff as Klementine, nicknamed 'Tinchen'
- Friedrich Benfer as André
- Theo Lucas as Mölfes
- Günther Lüders as tailor journeyman Peter Zimpel / Heinz Zimpel
- Lotte Rausch as Mariechen
- Ludwig Schmitz as Drögendiek
- Albert Florath as Totengräber
- Eva Tinschmann as Frau Heubes
- Paul Heidemann as Kommissar
- Rudolf Klein-Rogge as Pangdich
- Hubert von Meyerinck as Knillich
- Walter Lieck as Fitzkes
- Hans Adalbert Schlettow as Heubes
- S.O. Schoening as Picard
- Max Wilmsen as Krönkel
- Christine von Trümbach as Frau Krönkel
- Boris Alekin as Louis
- Marga Riffa as Frau Pangdich
- Maria Krahn
- Hans Hemes
- Wolfgang Dohnberg
- Robert Forsch
- Artur Malkowsky
- Albert Probeck
- Else Beyer-Andrae
- Elsa Dalands
- Jac Diehl
- Karl Heitmann
- Hilde Munsch
- Gerda Peter
- Lucie Polzin
- Ilse Pütz
- Paul Rehkopf
- Theodor Thony
- Auguste Wanner-Kirsch
- Franz Weber

== Bibliography ==
- Goble, Alan. The Complete Index to Literary Sources in Film. Walter de Gruyter, 1 Jan 1999.
