= Gottfried Huppertz =

German composer (1887–1937)

- Born: Gottfried Huppertz; 11 March 1887
- Origin: Köln, Germany
- Died: 7 February 1937 (aged 49)
- Occupation: Composer
- Years active: 1905–1937

Gottfried Huppertz (11 March 1887 – 7 February 1937) was a German composer who is perhaps most known for his scores to German expressionist silent films such as the science fiction epic Metropolis (1927). He collaborated with director Fritz Lang on multiple occasions.

== Life ==
Huppertz studied at the Conservatory of Music in Cologne and worked during World War I in Coburg, where he debuted in 1910 as a singer and actor. In 1920 he went to Berlin as an opera singer at the Nollendorfplatz theatre.

His first composition, "Rankende Rosen", was dedicated to the actor Rudolf Klein-Rogge, who introduced him in the early 1920s to director Fritz Lang and to Thea von Harbou (who later married Lang, but was at the time still married to Klein-Rogge). In the film, Dr. Mabuse, der Spieler (1922), Huppertz worked as an extra in the role of a hotel manager.

Huppertz composed his first film score for Lang's film Die Nibelungen (1924). While working on his 1925 score for the film Chronicles of the Gray House, Huppertz began working on the score of another film for Lang, Metropolis (1927). This became his best-known film score.

Besides scoring, Huppertz also wrote songs. Only some of his music has been recorded. The theme music for the first of the Karl May talkies, Across the Desert (1936), is included in the Karl May Film Music Collection Box Wild West, Hot Orient.

Huppertz died suddenly of a heart attack in 1937.

== Filmography ==
- Four Around a Woman (1921)
- Die Nibelungen: Siegfried (1924)
- Die Nibelungen: Kriemhilds Rache (1924)
- Chronicles of the Gray House (1925)
- Metropolis (1927)
- The Judas of Tyrol (1933)
- Elisabeth and the Fool (1934)
- Hanneles Himmelfahrt (1934)
- The Green Domino (1935)
- Across the Desert (1936)

== Phonograms ==
- 1924 - Shellac record of the opera "Love People," Huppertz vocalist on page 1 and 2, VOX Record No. 04023
- 1927 - "To the film Metropolis," on page 2 - sections of the Huppertz score, VOX records, No. 08386 and 08387
- 2011 - CD "Metropolis," Original Motion Picture Soundtrack, Germany radio culture, digital Capriccio C5066
- 2015 - 4 CD-set of 'Die Nibelungen' (including 'Siegfried' and 'Kriemhilds Rache), HR-Sinfonieorchester, Frank Strobel, PAN Classics 10345
- 2016 - 2 CD-set of 'Zur Chronik von Grieshuus', Frankfurt Radio Symphony, Frank Strobel, PAN Classics 10355

== Papers ==
Letters of Gottfried Huppertz are held by the Leipzig music publisher CF Peters in the Leipzig State Archives.
