= A Doctor of Conviction (1936 film) =

1936 German drama film

- Directed by: Hans H. Zerlett
- Written by: Hans H. Zerlett
- Based on: A Doctor of Conviction by Carl Unselt
- Produced by: Franz Vogel
- Starring: Albrecht Schoenhals; Karl Dannemann; Karin Hardt
- Cinematography: Georg Krause
- Edited by: Erich Palme
- Music by: Leo Leux
- Production company: Euphono-Film
- Distributed by: Märkische Film
- Release date: 30 April 1936
- Running time: 82 minutes
- Country: Germany
- Language: German

A Doctor of Conviction (German: Arzt aus Leidenschaft) is a 1936 German drama film directed by Hans H. Zerlett and starring Albrecht Schoenhals, Karl Dannemann and Karin Hardt. It was shot at the Babelsberg Studios in Berlin. The film's sets were designed by the art directors Karl Machus and Ludwig Reiber. It was based on the novel of the same title Carl Unselt, which was later adapted as 1959 West German film remake A Doctor of Conviction.

== Cast ==
- Albrecht Schoenhals as Dr. Felgentreu
- Karl Dannemann as Felgentreus Vetter
- Franz Weber as Dr. Oldewig
- Karin Hardt as Elisabeth
- Otto Wernicke as Geheimrat Grimm, Chefarzt der Klinik
- Hans Söhnker as Dr. Wüstefeld
- Gerda Maurus as Schwester Hilde
- Eva Tinschmann as Schwester Berta
- Joe Stöckel as Krankenwärter Engel
- Josef Eichheim as Krankenwärter Friedrich
- Hans Mierendorff as Direktor Kreyser
- Arthur Schröder as Werner, sein Sohn
- Margarete Schön as Frau Felgentreu
- Alfred Gerasch as Vorsitzender des Gerichts
- Curt Lucas as Staatsanwalt
- Lilo Hartmann as 3. Schwester
- Odette Orsy as 4. Schwester
- Curt Cappi as Bürovorsteher
- Heinz Wemper as Mann - der sich schlägt
- Rose Rauch as Sängerin

== Bibliography ==
- Goble, Alan. The Complete Index to Literary Sources in Film. Walter de Gruyter, 1999.
- Klaus, Ulrich J. Deutsche Tonfilme: Jahrgang 1936. Klaus-Archiv, 1988.
