= Tzwetta Tzatschewa =

- Born: 27 December 1900; Peshtera, Bulgaria
- Died: 12 December 1975 (aged 74); Nice, France
- Occupation: Actress
- Years active: 1918–1927

Tzwetta Tzatschewa (Bulgarian: Цвета Цачева, 27 December 1900 – 12 December 1975), sister of Manja Tzatschewa, was a Bulgarian film actress of the silent era.

== Selected filmography ==
- The Devil (1918)
- Love (1919)
- The Japanese Woman (1919)
- Hate (1920)
- The Pearl of the Orient (1921)
- Sons of the Night (1921)
- The Shadow of Gaby Leed (1921)
- Peter Voss, Thief of Millions (1921)
- Marizza (1922)
- The Monk from Santarem (1924)
- Letters Which Never Reached Him (1925)
- Annemarie and Her Cavalryman (1926)
- The Tragedy of a Lost Soul (1927)
