= Johann Alexander Hübler-Kahla =

Austrian film director, screenwriter, and producer

- Born: 23 June 1902; Vienna, Austro-Hungarian Empire
- Died: 6 April 1965 (aged 62); West Berlin, West Germany
- Other name: J.A. Hübler-Kahla
- Occupations: Screenwriter, producer, director
- Years active: 1929–1961

Johann Alexander Hübler-Kahla (23 June 1902 – 6 April 1965) was an Austrian screenwriter, film producer, and director. He directed seventeen films including the musical comedy Dance Music (1935) and the Karl May adaptation Across the Desert (1936).

== Selected filmography ==
=== Director ===
- Blood Brothers (1935)
- Dance Music (1935)
- The Violet of Potsdamer Platz (1936)
- Across the Desert (1936)
- The Mysterious Mister X (1936)
- Mikosch Comes In (1952)
- Starfish (1952)
- Dutch Girl (1953)
- The Inn on the Lahn (1955)

=== Producer ===
- The Trial (1948)
- My Aunt, Your Aunt (1956)
- Doctor Bertram (1957)
- A Doctor of Conviction (1959)
- The Hero of My Dreams (1960)

=== Writer ===
- Blood Brothers (1935)
- A Doctor of Conviction (1959)
- The Hero of My Dreams (1960)

== Bibliography ==
- Waldman, Harry. Nazi Films In America, 1933–1942. McFarland & Co, 2008.
