= The Hour of Temptation =

1936 film

- Directed by: Paul Wegener
- Written by: Erich Ebermayer
- Produced by: Ernst Krüger; Hans Herbert Ulrich
- Starring: Gustav Fröhlich; Lída Baarová; Harald Paulsen
- Cinematography: Karl Hasselmann
- Edited by: Fritz C. Mauch
- Music by: Giuseppe Becce
- Production company: UFA
- Distributed by: UFA
- Release date: 29 September 1936
- Running time: 75 minutes
- Country: Germany
- Language: German

The Hour of Temptation (German: Die Stunde der Versuchung) is a 1936 German mystery film directed by Paul Wegener and starring Gustav Fröhlich, Lída Baarová and Harald Paulsen.

The film's sets were designed by Karl Machus and Otto Moldenhauer.

== Cast ==
- Gustav Fröhlich as Lawyer Dr. Leuttern
- Lída Baarová as Irene - seine Frau
- Harald Paulsen as MacNorris - ein Frauenheld
- Theodor Loos as Geheimrat Rüdiger
- Elisabeth Wendt as Alice - seine Frau
- Bruno Ziener as Bürovorsteher Neumann
- Curt Cappi as Konsul Dittrich
- Margot Erbst as Seine Frau
- Margarete Lanner as Frau Dr. Rübsam
- Hertha Guthmar as Fräulein von Birkenfeld
- Walter Gross as Billy Miller - MacNorris' Freund
- Rudolf Klein-Rogge as Kriminalrat Brandt
- Karl Platen as Logenschließer in der Oper
- Josefine Dora as Garderobenfrau in der Oper
- Clemens Adrijenko as Herzog von Mantua in 'Rigoletto'
- Ludwig Körner as Rigoletto in 'Rigoletto'
- Gotthold Ditter as Graf Monterone in 'Rigoletto'
- Wilhelm Spering as Graf Ceprano in 'Rigoleto'
- Erna Westenberger as Gräfin Ceprano in 'Rigoletto'
- Edwin Heyer as Marullo in 'Rigoletto'
- Rudolf Schramm as Borsa in 'Rigoletto'
- Egon Balogh as Pferdepfleger im Reitclub
- Ursula Friese as Leutterns Dienstmädchen Marie
- Emmerich Hanus as Beamter der Mordkommission
- Loni Heuser as Barsängerin
- Paul Hildebrandt as Beamter der Mordkommission
- Gustav Mahncke as Diener in der Oper
- Edith Meinel as Leutterns Stenotypistin Fräulein Meinel
- Odette Orsy as Gardrobiere in der Künstlerloge
- Georg A. Profé as Sekretär bei Dr. Leuttern
- Alfred Pussert as Polizeifotograf
- Kurt von Ruffin as Irenes Bekannter Geiger
- Maria Wieke as Geigers Begleiterin
- Kurt Baumann-Grandeit as Geschäftsführer der Bar
- Charlotte Dahler as Blumenverkäuferin
- Erwin Ebbers as Kriminalbeamter
- Illo Gutschwager as Polizeifotograf
- Karl Hannemann as Kriminalkommissar März
- Heinrich Krill as Bargast
- Ida Krill as Bargast
- Rudolf Kölling as Choreograf
- Herrmann Luddecke as Opernregisseur
- Werner Jörg Lüddecke as Opernregisseur
- Kurt Richards as Tangotänzer
- Alfred Stratmann as Kriminalbeamter

== Bibliography ==
- Kreimeier, Klaus (1999). The Ufa Story: A History of Germany's Greatest Film Company, 1918–1945. University of California Press. ISBN 978-0-520-22069-0.
