= Alois Johannes Lippl =

German screenwriter and film director

- Born: 21 June 1903; Munich, Bavaria, German Empire
- Died: 8 October 1957 (aged 54); Gräfelfing, Bavaria, West Germany
- Occupations: Director, Writer
- Years active: 1937-1983 (film)

Alois Johannes Lippl (1903–1957) was a German screenwriter and film director.

== Selected filmography ==
- Marriage Strike (1935)
- The Last Four on Santa Cruz (1936)
- The Gambler (1938)
- A Heart Beats for You (1949)
- Marriages Forbidden (1957)

== Bibliography ==
- Goble, Alan. The Complete Index to Literary Sources in Film. Walter de Gruyter, 1999.
