= Tailor Wibbel =

Tailor Wibbel (German:Schneider Wibbel) a 1938 opera by the German composer Mark Lothar. It is based on the 1913 comedy play Wibbel the Tailor by Hans Müller-Schlösser. Müller-Schlösser wrote the opera's libretto. It premiered at the Berlin State Opera on 12 May 1938.

== Synopsis ==
During the French occupation of Düsseldorf in 1813, during the Napoleonic Wars, a local tailor becomes a thorn in their side.

== Bibliography ==
- Cooke, Mervyn. The Cambridge Companion to Twentieth-Century Opera. Cambridge University Press, 2005.
- London, John. Theatre Under the Nazis. Manchester University Press, 2000.
