= Battle of the Sexes (1920 film) =

1920 film directed by Joseph Delmont

- Directed by: Joseph Delmont
- Written by: Joseph Delmont
- Produced by: Franz Vogel
- Starring: Paul Hartmann; Eduard von Winterstein; Eva Everth
- Cinematography: Karl Machus
- Production company: Eiko Film
- Release date: 2 January 1920
- Country: Germany
- Languages: Silent; German intertitles

Battle of the Sexes (German: Der Kampf der Geschlechter) is a 1920 German silent film directed by Joseph Delmont and starring Paul Hartmann, Eduard von Winterstein and Eva Everth.

== Cast ==
- Paul Hartmann
- Eduard von Winterstein
- Eva Everth
- Meinhard Wauer
- Fritz Hartwig
- Gustav Botz
- Paul Conradi
- Ria Alldorf
- Aenderly Lebius

== Bibliography ==
- Bock, Hans-Michael; Bergfelder, Tim, eds. (2009). The Concise Cinegraph: Encyclopaedia of German Cinema. New York: Berghahn Books. ISBN 978-1-57181-655-9.
