= The Eighteen Year Old =

1927 film directed by Manfred Noa

- Directed by: Manfred Noa
- Written by: Josef Than; Ludwig von Wohl
- Produced by: Manfred Noa
- Starring: Andrée Lafayette; Ernő Verebes; Frida Richard
- Cinematography: Franz Planer
- Music by: Hans May
- Production company: Noa-Film
- Distributed by: Bavaria Film
- Release date: 7 April 1927
- Country: Germany
- Languages: Silent; German intertitles

The Eighteen Year Old (German: Die Achtzehnjährigen) is a 1927 German silent drama film directed by Manfred Noa and starring Andrée Lafayette, Ernő Verebes, and Frida Richard.

It was made at the Staaken Studios in Berlin. The film's sets were designed by Karl Machus.

== Cast ==
- Andrée Lafayette as Yvette de Valombres
- Ernő Verebes as Gaston Ravel
- Frida Richard as Gastons Mutter
- Evelyn Holt as Madeleine Lamont
- Paul Otto as Henrz Leclerc
- Asta Gundt as Arlette
- Loo Hardy as Ninette, Zofe
- Sig Arno as Alexandre Rappaport
- Teddy Bill as Paul Malot
- Oreste Bilancia
- Georg H. Schnell
- Fritz Richard

== Bibliography ==
- Grange, William (2008). Cultural Chronicle of the Weimar Republic. Lanham, MD: Scarecrow Press. ISBN 978-0-8108-5967-8.
