= The Bracelet (film) =

1918 film directed by Hubert Moest

- Directed by: Hubert Moest
- Written by: Max Kretzer (novel)
- Produced by: Franz Vogel
- Starring: Reinhold Schünzel; Eva Speyer
- Production company: Eiko Film
- Release date: 2 January 1918
- Country: Germany
- Languages: Silent; German intertitles

The Bracelet (German: Das Armband) is a 1918 German silent crime film directed by Hubert Moest and starring Reinhold Schünzel and Eva Speyer.

== Cast ==
- Reinhold Schünzel as Hausfreund
- Eva Speyer as Frau
- Hugo Werner-Kahle as Olt. Krannier
- Max Ruhbeck

== Bibliography ==
- Bock, Hans-Michael; Bergfelder, Tim, eds. (2009). The Concise Cinegraph: Encyclopaedia of German Cinema. New York: Berghahn Books. ISBN 978-1-57181-655-9.
