= The Brenken Case =

- Directed by: Carl Lamac
- Written by: Peter Ort; Henry Koster
- Produced by: Eduard van Meghen
- Starring: Walter Steinbeck; Hans Brausewetter; Rudolf Klein-Rogge
- Cinematography: Karl Hasselmann
- Edited by: Fritz C. Mauch
- Music by: Eduard Künneke
- Production company: Westdeutsche Tonfilm-Produktion
- Distributed by: Otzoup Film
- Release date: 12 October 1934
- Running time: 88 minutes
- Country: Germany
- Language: German

The Brenken Case (German: Der Fall Brenken) is a 1934 German comedy crime film directed by Carl Lamac and starring Walter Steinbeck, Hans Brausewetter and Rudolf Klein-Rogge. The film's sets were designed by the art directors Gustav A. Knauer and Alexander Mügge.

== Synopsis ==
An attack on the industrialist owner of the Brenken factory draws newspaper headlines. It later transpires that he has organised it himself in order to try to deter rivals from buying his company's shares on the stock exchange.

== Cast ==
- Walter Steinbeck as Generaldirektor Hermann Brenken, Industrieller
- Hans Brausewetter as Hans Hall, Berichterstatter
- Rudolf Klein-Rogge as Bert Benson, Artist
- Genia Nikolaieva as Inge Brandt, Schauspielerin
- Jessie Vihrog as Lotte Menzig, Telephonistin
- Trude Hesterberg as Fräulein Bomst, Direktrice Gussersee-Hotel
- Franz Weber as Alois Huber, Nachtportier Gussersee-Hotel
- Hans Berghaus as Der Tagportier Gussersee-Hotel
- Veit Harlan as Der Unbekannte
- Adele Sandrock as Die Frau Generalin

== Bibliography ==
- Noack, Frank. Veit Harlan: The Life and Work of a Nazi Filmmaker. University Press of Kentucky, 2016.
