= Rudolf Klein-Rogge =

German actor (1885–1955)

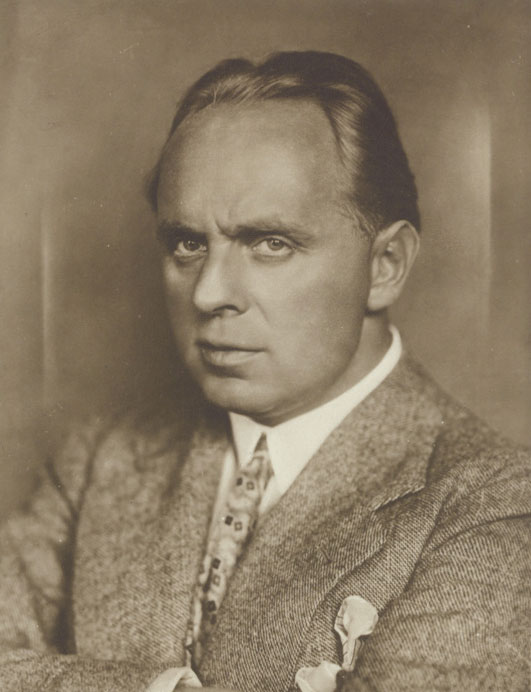
- Born: Friedrich Rudolf Klein; 24 November 1885; Cologne, German Empire
- Died: 29 May 1955 (aged 69); Wetzelsdorf, Austria
- Occupation: Actor
- Years active: 1912–1942
- Spouses: Gerda Melchior, née Porten (1909?–1913) Divorced; Thea von Harbou (1914–1921) Divorced; Margarethe Neff (1921–1928) Divorced; Mary Johnson (Astrid Maria Carlsson) (1932–1955; his death)

Friedrich Rudolf Klein (24 November 1885 – 29 May 1955), better known as Rudolf Klein-Rogge, was a German film actor, best known for playing sinister figures in films in the 1920s and 1930s as well as being a mainstay in director Fritz Lang's Weimar-era films. He is probably best known in popular culture, particularly to English-speaking audiences, for playing the archetypal mad scientist role of C. A. Rotwang in Lang's Metropolis and as the criminal genius Doctor Mabuse. Klein-Rogge also appeared in several important French films in the late 1920s and early 1930s.

== Biography ==
Friedrich Rudolf Klein was born in Cologne, Germany on 24 November 1885. His father, Hermann Rudolf Klein, was a military lawyer who served as auditeur (the equivalent of Judge Advocate General) for the 15th Division of the Prussian Army, garrisoned at Cologne. His mother, Maria Bertha Emma Rose, was the daughter of a prominent landowner in Lichteinen, East Prussia.

The elder Klein hoped his son would follow him into a military career and entered him in one of the elite Prussian cadet academies (possibly nearby Bensberg). These institutions were famous for their harsh discipline and dedication to Spartan ideals; many of Germany's most renowned 19th and 20th century military leaders attended such schools. On his deathbed, however, Klein-Rogge confided to a friend that when a teacher sexually abused him, he ran away from school. Traveling by night and hiding during the day, the boy returned home only to be told by his father that he was a sissy and from henceforth he was the "black sheep" of his family.

His father's premature death in 1896 ended Klein-Rogge's tenure at the cadet school and he entered a local humanistic gymnasium in Cologne. One of his childhood friends was future film composer Gottfried Huppertz, who was to write the scores for Lang's Die Nibelungen as well as Metropolis. Huppertz dedicated his first composition, "Rankende Rosen" ["Climbing Roses"], to Klein-Rogge.) It was likely the actor who introduced his old friend to Lang.

Klein-Rogge spent three years at the University of Bonn (then Rhein-Universität) and in Berlin, studying art history. He also began taking acting lessons from Hans Siebert, a veteran of Vienna's Burgtheater, and made his stage debut in 1909, playing Cassius in Julius Caesar in Halberstadt. As there was a contemporary actor named Rudolf Klein, the future film star added "Rogge" to his name. (Rogge was the surname of his mother's first husband and his half-siblings.)

After his debut, Klein-Rogge went on to play in theaters located in Düsseldorf, Kiel and Aachen. In Aachen, Klein-Rogge wed actress Gerda Melchior, a cousin of the beloved silent film star Henny Porten, but the marriage ended when he met actress and novelist Thea von Harbou. The two married in 1914 and the following year, Klein-Rogge joined Nuremberg's Städtische Bühnen theatre as both an actor and director. In 1918, the pair moved to Berlin to capitalize on von Harbou's writing skills and her budding career as a scenarist and screenwriter, while Klein-Rogge was hired by Victor Barnowsky, director of Berlin's Lessing Theater.

Klein-Rogge's film career began in earnest in 1919, although he may have made an uncredited screen debut in 1913's Der Film von der Königin Luise, directed by Franz Porten. It has been more widely stated that he appeared in an uncredited role of a criminal in The Cabinet of Dr. Caligari. However, recent research has found that the part was actually played by Ludwig Rex. The confusion may have stemmed from Klein-Rogge's skill in disguising his appearance with theatrical makeup, wigs and prosthetics, which has led at least one movie historian to dub him Germany's Lon Chaney.

At this time, von Harbou was having an affair with director Fritz Lang and eventually left Klein-Rogge to marry Lang. Despite the split, Klein-Rogge made several films that were written by von Harbou and directed by Lang, including Destiny, Dr. Mabuse the Gambler, Die Nibelungen, Metropolis and Spies. Klein-Rogge's intense look led him to similar roles such as a tyrant in Fritz Wendhausen's Der steinerne Reiter, a pirate in Arthur Robison's Pietro der Korsar, and the Czar in Alexandre Volkoff's Casanova. Klein-Rogge's last film with Lang was The Testament of Dr. Mabuse in 1933.

Klein-Rogge played the lead roles in two films written and directed by von Harbou: Elisabeth und der Narr and Hanneles Himmelfahrt. Klein-Rogge remarried twice, first to Margarete Neff, and lastly with the Swedish actress Mary Johnson in 1932, to whom he remained married until his death in 1955.

== Selected filmography ==
- Das Licht am Fenster (1919)
- Spiele eines Milliardärs (1919)
- Das Geheimnis des Irren (1919)
- Morphium (1919)
- Flitter-Dörtje (1919)
- Die Launen eines Milliardärs (1919)
- Der Fall Tolstikoff (1919) - Ernst Rüdiger
- Die Schreckensnacht im Irrenhaus Ivoy (1920) - Dr. Harry Walker
- Wildes Blut (1920)
- The Black Count (1920)
- The Wandering Image (1920) - Georgs Vetter Wil Brand
- Four Around a Woman (1921) - Hehler Upton
- The Nights of Cornelis Brouwer (1921)
- Am Webstuhl der Zeit (1921)
- Destiny (1921) - Derwisch / Girolamo
- Circus of Life (1921) - Chauffeur Tom
- Dr. Mabuse the Gambler (1922) - Dr. Mabuse
- The Stone Rider (1923) - Der Herr vom Berge
- Princess Suwarin (1923) - Cyrus Proctor
- Warning Shadows (1923)
- Die Nibelungen (1924) - King Etzel
- Peter the Pirate (1925) - Salvatore, ein Korsarhauptmann
- Her Husband's Wife (1926)
- The Pink Diamond (1926) - Stuart, Theaterdirektor
- Fadette (1926) - Rossini
- Fighting the White Slave Traffic (1926) - Akkunian
- White Slave Traffic (1926) - Simpat Karamanian / Arut Akkunian / ein deutscher Professor / ein asiatischer Hausierer / Dr. Papamarkos
- Metropolis (1927) - Erfinder C.A. Rotwang / The Inventor
- The Gypsy Baron (1927) - Mehmed Ali
- Der Herr der Nacht (1927) - Eugen Lascano
- The Queen Was in the Parlour (1927) - General Kish
- The Loves of Casanova (1927) - Le Tsar Peter III
- Tingel-Tangel (1927) - Don Fabio Coridon
- Die raffinierteste Frau Berlins (1927) - William Pitts alias Francis Forest
- The Girl from Frisco (1927)
- Die Sandgräfin (1928)
- Spies (1928) - Haghi
- Mädchenschicksale (1928) - Lormand
- Volga Volga (1928) - Kosak Hadschi-Ali
- The Most Beautiful Woman in Paris (1928)
- La faute de Monique (1928)
- Eine Nacht in Yoshiwara (1928)
- Tu m'appartiens! (1929) - Burat-Laussade
- La maison des hommes vivants (1929)
- The Shark (1930) - Vasseur
- Tarakanova (1930) - Le Comte Chouvalof
- Eskimo (1930) - Mariak
- The White God (1932) - Mariak
- The Testament of Dr. Mabuse (1933) - Docteur Mabuse
- The Judas of Tyrol (1933) - Erster Offizier
- Elisabeth and the Fool (1934) - Michele
- The World Without a Mask (1934) - Merker
- Hanneles Himmelfahrt (1934) - Maurer Mattern
- Border Patrol (1934) - Der Einäugige - ein Schmuggler
- Paganini (1934) - Graf Hédouville / Kurier Napoleons
- Between Heaven and Earth (1934) - Der alte Nettenmaier
- The Brenken Case (1934) - Bert Benson, Artist
- The Tannhof Women (1934) - Jakob Aigner, der Tannenhofbauer
- The Old and the Young King (1935) - Leopold Dessauer
- The Cossack and the Nightingale (1935) - Dschahid-Bey, Tabakgroßhändler
- Lessons in Love (1935)
- The Valley of Love (1935) - Herr von Roden
- Ein seltsamer Gast (1936) - Polizeipräfekt
- The Hour of Temptation (1936) - Kriminalrat Brandt
- Der Kaiser von Kalifornien (1936) - Bankier
- Moral (1936) - Polizeipräsident von Simbach
- Die un-erhörte Frau (1936) - Professor der Nervenklinik
- Intermezzo (1936) - Ponbiquet
- The Court Concert (1936) - Oberst Flumms
- Truxa (1937) - Varieté-Direktor
- The Ruler (1937) - Direktor Bodlfing
- The Divine Jetta (1937) - Stadtrat Müller
- Madame Bovary (1937) - Prof. Canivet
- Strife Over the Boy Jo (1937) - Der Deutsche Gesandte
- The Yellow Flag (1937) - Kapitän Ellis
- Der Katzensteg (1937) - Landrat Krotkeim
- Abenteuer in Marokko (1938) - Dr. Linder
- Ab Mitternacht (1938)
- Zwei Frauen (1938)
- Sergeant Berry (1938)
- Stars of Variety (1939) - Kommissar Wiedemann
- Parkstrasse 13 (1939) - Direktor Bremer
- Wibbel the Tailor (1939) - Pangdich
- Robert Koch (1939) - Rechnungsrat
- Kennwort Machin (1939) - Schnellrichter in New York
- Rheinische Brautfahrt (1939) - Landrat
- Die unvollkommene Liebe (1940) - Konsul Henry Rasmus
- Das Herz der Königin (1940) - General Ruthven
- Kora Terry (1940) - Dunkler Ehrenmann, Komplize Vopescus
- Wedding in Barenhof (1942) - Sanitätsrat
- Hexen (1949) - (final film role)

== Notes ==
=== References ===
- Bock, Hans-Michael (2009). The Concise Cinegraph: Encyclopaedia of German Cinema. Berghahn Books. ISBN 9780857455659.
- Eisner, Lotte H. (2008). The Haunted Screen: Expressionism in the German Cinema and the Influence of Max Reinhardt. University of California Press. ISBN 978-0-520-25790-0.
