= Blood Brothers (1935 film) =

1935 film

- Directed by: Johann Alexander Hübler-Kahla
- Written by: Johann Alexander Hübler-Kahla; Franz Tanzler
- Starring: Brigitte Horney; Carl Esmond; Attila Hörbiger
- Cinematography: Georg Muschner; Paul Rischke
- Music by: Willy Schmidt-Gentner
- Production company: Alka
- Distributed by: Kiba Kinobetriebsanstalt (Austria)
- Release date: 15 March 1935
- Running time: 78 minutes
- Country: Germany
- Language: German

Blood Brothers (German: Blutsbrüder) is a 1935 German drama film directed by Johann Alexander Hübler-Kahla and starring Brigitte Horney, Carl Esmond and Attila Hörbiger. It is set in Bosnia.

== Cast ==
- Brigitte Horney as Mara (the maid)
- Carl Esmond as Mirko (the lord)
- Attila Hörbiger as Bojan (the hero)
- Willi Schur as Gascho (the servant)
- Friedrich Gnaß
- Erna Heinrich
- Hermann Meyer-Falkow
- Sophie Otto
- Josef Reithofer
- Anna von Palen

== Bibliography ==
- Bock, Hans-Michael; Bergfelder, Tim, eds. (2009). The Concise Cinegraph: Encyclopaedia of German Cinema. New York: Berghahn Books. ISBN 978-1-57181-655-9.
