= The Uncle from the Provinces =

1926 film directed by Manfred Noa

- Directed by: Manfred Noa
- Written by: Lothar Knud Frederik; Margarete-Maria Langen
- Starring: Jakob Tiedtke; Margarete Kupfer; Liane Haid
- Cinematography: Otto Kanturek
- Music by: Hans May; Heinrich Reinhardt
- Production company: Noa-Film
- Distributed by: Süd-Film
- Release date: 28 May 1926
- Country: Germany
- Languages: Silent; German intertitles

The Uncle from the Provinces (German: Der Provinzonkel) is a 1926 German silent film directed by Manfred Noa and starring Jakob Tiedtke, Margarete Kupfer and Liane Haid.

The film's sets were designed by Julius von Borsody.

== Cast ==
- Jakob Tiedtke as Provinzonkel
- Margarete Kupfer as Provinzonkels Gattin
- Liane Haid as Die Tänzerin
- Harry Hardt as Der Braütigam
- Lotte Lorring as Köchin
- Fritz Kampers as Der diener- Küchins Braütigam
- Sig Arno as Schieber

== Bibliography ==
- Grange, William. Cultural Chronicle of the Weimar Republic. Scarecrow Press, 2008.
