= Green devils =

Green devils may refer to:

- Fallschirmjäger, WW2 German paratroopers
- The Green Devils of Monte Cassino, a 1958 film
- RC 1 "Cnel Valois Rivarola", a renowned Paraguayan Cavalry Regiment during the Chaco War nicknamed the "Los Diablos Verdes"
