= Paul Hartmann (actor) =

German actor (1889–1977)

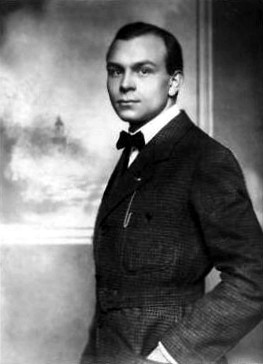
- Paul Hartmann in 1925
- Born: Paul Wilhelm Constantin Hartmann; 8 January 1889; Fürth, Bavaria, German Empire
- Died: 30 June 1977 (aged 88); Munich, Bavaria, West Germany
- Occupation: Actor
- Years active: 1915–1969

Paul Wilhelm Constantin Hartmann (8 January 1889 – 30 June 1977) was a German stage and film actor.

== Selected filmography ==
- Zofia - Kriegs-Irrfahrten eines Kindes (1915)
- Die verschleierte Dame (1915)
- Ein Blatt Papier (1916)
- Das Opfer der Yella Rogesius (1917)
- Feenhände (1917) as Georg
- Christa Hartungen (1917) as Bernd Römer
- Die Claudi vom Geiserhof (1917) as Hieronymus
- Mountain Air (1917) as Egon
- Die leere Wasserflasch (1917)
- Der Trompeter von Säckingen (1918)
- Es werde Licht! (1918) as Ernst Hartwig
- Mouchy (1918)
- The Prisoner of Dahomey (1918)
- Precious Stones (1918)
- Der unheimliche Gast (1918) as Uwe Johanssen
- Taumel (1919)
- The Loves of Käthe Keller (1919)
- Die Hexe von Norderoog (1919)
- The Secret of Wera Baranska (1919)
- Blonde Poison (1919) as Georg Maudi
- The Galley Slave (1919) as Rastignac
- The Girl and the Men (1919)
- Monika Vogelsang (1920) as Amadeo Vaselli, Kirchenmaler
- Battle of the Sexes (1920)
- Mary Magdalene (1920) as Karl
- Können Gedanken töten? (1920) as Geliebter
- The Dancer Barberina (1920)
- In the Whirl of Life (1920)
- The Golden Crown (1920) as Herzog Franz Günther
- Catherine the Great (1920) as Alexander Manonow
- Humanity Unleashed (1920) as Michael Klarenbach, Chemiker
- Anna Boleyn (1920) as Sir Henry Norris
- Die Verschleierte (1920)
- Hashish, the Paradise of Hell (1921) as Der Jüngling
- Schloß Vogeloed (1921) as Graf Peter Paul Oetsch
- Impostor (1921)
- The Inheritance of Tordis (1921) as Graf von Heyst
- Die Jungfrau von Kynast (1921)
- Die Abenteuer der schönen Dorette (1921)
- The Story of Christine von Herre (1921) as Conte Marino Marco
- Die Sängerin (1921)
- Die reine Sünderin (1921)
- Madame de La Pommeraye's Intrigues (1922)
- Today's Children (1922)
- Barmaid (1922) as Günther Romberg
- Luise Millerin (1922) as Ferdinand
- Vanina (1922) as Octavio
- The False Dimitri (1922) as Peter Grigory
- Old Heidelberg (1923) as Erbprinz Karl Heinz
- Fridericus Rex - 3. Teil: Sanssouci (1923) as Friedrich Freiherr von der Trenck
- Tatjana (1923) as Fedja Gorykin
- The Slipper Hero (1923)
- The Lost Shoe (1923) as Anselm Franz
- The Evangelist (1924) as Evangelimann, Lehrer einer Klosterschule
- Chronicles of the Gray House (1925) as Junker Hinrich
- The Dice Game of Life (1925) as Hanns Freiherr v. Rhoden
- Goetz von Berlichingen of the Iron Hand (1925) as Adalbert von Weislingen
- Der Rosenkavalier (1925) as Marschall
- Our Daily Bread (1926) as Overseer
- The Family without Morals (1927) as Vinzenz
- Tingel-Tangel (1927) as Derfinger, Sekretär
- F.P.1 (1932) as Kapitänleutnant Droste
- The House of Dora Green (1933) as Frank Gebhard
- The Marathon Runner (1933) as José Barrada
- Invisible Opponent (1933) as Peter Ugron
- Grand Duchess Alexandra (1933) as Großfürst Michael
- The Tunnel (1933) as Mac Allen
- Schwarzer Jäger Johanna (1934) as Major Georg Ludwig Korfes
- The Legacy of Pretoria (1934) as Bernhard Fredersen
- Mazurka (1935) as Boris Kierow
- Everything for a Woman (1935) as Heinrich Droop, Besitzer einer Tankstelle
- Die klugen Frauen (1936) as Der Herzog von Olivarez
- The Castle in Flanders (1936) as Fred Winsbury
- Stronger Than Regulations (1936) as Lawyer Dr. Birk
- Port Arthur (1936) as Wossidlow
- Gräfin Volescu (1936)
- Togger (1937) as Chefredakteur Togger
- The Citadel of Warsaw (1937) as Oberst Korniloff
- The Stars Shine (1938) as himself
- Mit versiegelter Order (1938) as Ingenieur Keßler
- Revolutionary Wedding (1938) as Marc Arron
- Triad (1938) as Albert von Möller - Hauptmann a.D.
- Pour le Mérite (1938) as Rittmeister Prank
- The False Step (1939) as Major a.D. von Crampas
- Mistake of the Heart (1939) as Professor Reimers
- Legion Condor (1939) as Kommandant der Jagdflieger
- Bal paré (1940) as Dr. Horst Heisterkamp
- Bismarck (1940) as Otto von Bismarck
- Above All Else in the World (1941) as Otl. Steinhart
- Ich klage an (1941) as Professor Thomas Heyt
- My Summer Companion (1943) as Dr. Manfred Claudius, Arzt, Jugendfreund von Angelika
- The Roedern Affair (1944) as Festungsbaumeister Dietrich von Roedern
- Gateway to Peace (1951) as Paul Dressler, ungarischer Gutsbesitzer
- The Lady in Black (1951) as Frederik Royce
- Monks, Girls and Hungarian Soldiers (1952) as Kurfürst von Bayern
- The Sergeant's Daughter (1952) as Freiherr von Lauffen
- Cuba Cabana (1952) as Gouverneur
- The Monastery's Hunter (1953) as Herr Heinrich
- Life Begins at Seventeen (1953) as Professor Lenoire
- Regina Amstetten (1954) as Pastor Fehrmann
- Conchita and the Engineer (1954) as Prof. Dahlheim
- Ein toller Tag (1954) as Count Almaviva
- Captain Wronski (1954) as Oberst Ranke
- Roses in Autumn (1955) as Mr. von Briest
- Die Barrings (1955) as Archibald von Barring
- William Tell (1956) as Werner Stauffacher
- Es wird alles wieder gut (1957) as Friedrich Horstmann, ihr Vater
- The Fox of Paris (1957) as Col. Gen. von der Heinitz
- Bimbo the Great (1958) as Zirkusdirektor Williams
- The Blue Moth (1959) as Lawyer Dr. Frahm
- Roses for the Prosecutor (1959) as Landgerichtspräsident Diefenbach
- The Buddenbrooks (1959) as Pastor Kölling
- Waldrausch (1962) as Der alte Stuiber
- The Longest Day (1962) as Field Marshal Gerd von Rundstedt

== Bibliography ==
- Eisner, Lotte H. (1969). The Haunted Screen: Expressionism in the German Cinema and the Influence of Max Reinhardt. University of California Press. ISBN 978-0-520-02479-3.
