= Antje Geerk =

German actress (born 1938)

Antje Geerk (born 17 June 1938 in Kiel) is a German stage and film actress.

== Life ==
Geerk was born the daughter of an engineer. During the Second World War, she lived with a great-grandmother in Landshut, but before the end of the war moved to her parents in Göttingen and attended a local primary school. After a short period of residence in Kiel and Weil am Rhein, Geerk attended the humanistic grammar school in Lörrach. In 1955 she passed the Abitur in Kiel. She lived at this time with grandparents.

Geerk originally wanted to become an engineer, but was already interested in acting during her school years and took appropriate lessons. In 1955 she passed an aptitude test as an actress in Hamburg. She had her first theatre appearance in the Komödie Basel. After several feature films, engagements at theatres in Austria, Germany and Switzerland, she last played several years at the Zimmertheater (chamber theatre) in Heidelberg, where she now lives.

== Selected filmography ==
- Doctor Bertram (1957)
- That Won't Keep a Sailor Down (1958)
- The Green Devils of Monte Cassino (1958)
- Worüber man nicht spricht (1958) (1958)
- Blitzmädels an die Front (1958)
- A Doctor of Conviction (1959)
- Uncle Was a Vampire (1959)
- A Summer You Will Never Forget (1959)
- Lieder klingen am Lago Maggiore (1962)
