= Eros in Chains =

1929 film

- Directed by: Conrad Wiene
- Written by: Louis Nerz; Conrad Wiene
- Starring: Emmy Flemmich; Maly Delschaft; Walter Slezak
- Cinematography: Robert Lach
- Production company: Gold-Film
- Release date: 19 September 1929
- Running time: 89 minutes
- Countries: Austria; Germany
- Languages: Silent; German intertitles

Eros in Chains (German: Eros in Ketten) is a 1929 Austrian-German silent drama film directed by Conrad Wiene and starring Emmy Flemmich, Maly Delschaft and Walter Slezak.

== Cast ==
- Emmy Flemmich as Frau Maria Reinke
- Maly Delschaft as Lilo - ihre Tochter
- Walter Slezak as Heinz Ewer
- Christian Holt as Rechnungsrat Faber
- Anita Dorris as Maria, seine Tochter
- Bert Torren as Kurt Merkel
- Lizzi Natzler as Luise
- Trude Fiedler-Seitz as Frau Immergrün
- Paul Askonas as Vorsitzender des Jugendgerichts
- Karl Weidinger as Der Leiter des Heimes
- Marianne Wulff as Die Oberschwester
- Karl Tema as Ein Dienstmann
- Tylda Und Lee as Ein Tanzpaar
- Paul Frank as Der Polizeikommissar
- Hanns Marschall as Ein Detektiv

== Bibliography ==
- Robert Dassanowsky. Austrian Cinema: A History. McFarland, 2005.
- Siegbert Salomon Prawer. Blaue Engel. British Film Institute, 2002.
