= Sons of the Night =

1921 film directed by Manfred Noa

- Directed by: Manfred Noa
- Written by: Margarete-Maria Langen
- Produced by: Franz Vogel
- Starring: Tzwetta Tzatschewa; Hans Albers; Ludwig Rex
- Production company: Eiko Film
- Distributed by: Eiko Film
- Release dates: 1 September 1921 (Part I); 8 September 1921 (Part II)
- Country: Germany
- Languages: Silent; German intertitles

Sons of the Night (German: Söhne der Nacht) is a 1921 German silent film directed by Manfred Noa and starring Tzwetta Tzatschewa, Hans Albers and Ludwig Rex. It premiered at the Marmorhaus in Berlin, and was released in two parts.

It was shot at the Marienfelde Studios of Eiko Film. The film's sets were designed by the art director Karl Machus.

== Cast ==
- Tzwetta Tzatschewa
- Hans Albers
- Ludwig Rex
- Esther Hagan
- Edmund Löwe
- Robert Scholz
- Wolfgang von Schwindt

== Bibliography ==
- Alfred Krautz. International directory of cinematographers, set- and costume designers in film, Volume 4. Saur, 1984.
