= The Unmarried Woman =

1917 film

- Directed by: Rudolf Del Zopp
- Written by: Rudolf Del Zopp
- Produced by: Franz Vogel
- Starring: Hanne Brinkmann; Reinhold Schünzel
- Production company: Eiko-Film
- Distributed by: Eiko-Film
- Release date: July 1917
- Country: Germany
- Languages: Silent; German intertitles

The Unmarried Woman (German: Die ledige Frau) is a 1917 German silent drama film, directed by Rudolf Del Zopp and starring Hanne Brinkmann and Reinhold Schünzel.

== Cast ==
- Hanne Brinkmann
- Reinhold Schünzel
- Kitty Johns
- Harry Waghalter

== Bibliography ==
- Bock, Hans-Michael & Bergfelder, Tim. The Concise CineGraph. Encyclopedia of German Cinema. Berghahn Books, 2009.
