= The Gambler (1938 film) =

1938 film

- Directed by: Gerhard Lamprecht
- Written by: Peter Hagen; Alois Johannes Lippl
- Based on: The Gambler by Fyodor Dostoevsky
- Produced by: Franz Vogel
- Starring: Eugen Klöpfer; Lída Baarová; Hedwig Bleibtreu
- Cinematography: Otto Baecker
- Edited by: Fritz C. Mauch
- Music by: Giuseppe Becce
- Production companies: Euphono-Film; Kreutzberg-Produktion
- Distributed by: Tobis Film
- Release date: 1 September 1938
- Running time: 80 minutes
- Country: Germany
- Language: German

The Gambler (German: Der Spieler) is a 1938 German drama film directed by Gerhard Lamprecht and starring Eugen Klöpfer, Lída Baarová, and Hedwig Bleibtreu. It is based on Fyodor Dostoevsky's 1866 novel The Gambler. Due to the scandal over Baarová's affair with Joseph Goebbels, followed by her return to Czechoslovakia, the film was withdrawn from cinemas three days after its release. It was not given a release again until 1950. A similar fate had befallen another film of hers, A Prussian Love Story. It was shot at the Johannisthal Studios in Berlin. The film's sets were designed by the art directors Robert Herlth and Heinrich Weidemann. A separate French-language version Le Joueur (1938) was also released, with Pierre Blanchar and Viviane Romance.

== Plot ==
Young Russian Nina is staying with her father, retired General Kirileff, in the German spa town of Hohenburg. Her father has gambled away his fortune at the roulette table and is now borrowing more money from the supposed Baron Vincent at exorbitant interest. He wants to get Kirileff to agree to his marriage to Nina, who will be entitled to a large inheritance when her grandmother dies. Nina cannot stand Baron Vincent, since she sees through his machinations. Blanche du Placet, rumored to be a countess, is in tow of Vincent. Her intentions are similar to those of the baron: she ensnares Kirileff, who has already proposed to her. Blanche thinks he is a big landowner in Russia. Alexej, a former student and now secretary of Kirileff, and the German doctor Dr. Tronka are also present in Hohenburg. Alexej is in love with Nina, but she takes advantage of his feelings depending on her mood. Dr. Tronka, who is also not indifferent to the young woman, is treated with barely perceptible condescension.

When Vincent presses for the debt to be paid, Kirileff, in his distress, claims that he knows for sure that Nina's grandmother is dying. Nina is dismayed by her father's behavior and wants to save the family honor. She sells her jewelry and tries to win the money at the gaming table. In the end, she gambles everything away, and her father's ruin seems sealed. A telegram from home seems to be the solution to all their problems, since Kirileff believes that Nina's grandmother has died. She, however, appears a short time later in Hohenburg and discovers roulette herself. She loses a large amount of money gambling, but knows when to stop and soon travels back to Russia. Nina decides against going with her and stays with her father.

The young woman rejects other offers of help. She does not want Dr. Tronka to pay off her father's debts; she fears selling herself to him. Alexej, on the other hand, can no longer help her because he has become a player himself. Due to all the excitement, Nina falls ill and confides in Dr. Tronka. Shortly thereafter, he challenges Vincent to a duel, and the false baron flees. He gives Kirileff's bills to Blanche, who begins a relationship with Alexej and sells him the bills. Dr. Tronka nurses Nina back to health. Suddenly, Alexei appears and assures the young woman that he has always loved her and cannot live without her. He wants to return to Russia with Nina, and tells her that he has already destroyed her father's bills of exchange. However, Dr. Tronka recently acquired all of the outstanding bills. When Alexej finds out about this, he realizes that Blanche must have stolen the bills and sold them again. His proof of love to Nina, to save her father by buying the bills of exchange, is therefore void. This realization enrages Alexei so much that he wants to do something to Blanche. Nina asks Dr. Tronka to stop Alexej. He makes Alexei promise not to play anymore and gives him money to pay for his return to Russia. Dr. Tronka tells Nina that she is relieved of any obligation towards Alexej and should now let her feelings decide her future. Alexej succumbs to his addiction. At the roulette table he loses all the money that Dr. Tronka gave him to pay for the journey.

== Cast ==
- Eugen Klöpfer as General Kirileff
- Lída Baarová as Nina - seine Tochter
- Hedwig Bleibtreu as Babuschka
- Albrecht Schoenhals as Dr. Tronka
- Hilde Körber as Comtesse du Placet
- Karl Martell as Baron Vincent
- Hannes Stelzer as Alexej, der Spieler
- Ellen Bang as Gewinnerin am Spieltisch
- Charlotte Fredersdorf as Frau am Spieltisch
- Maria Krahn as Frau am Spieltisch
- Elsa Wagner as Marfa, Kinderfrau
- Paul Bildt as Mann am Spieltisch
- Fritz Fiedler as Spieler
- Karl Dannemann
- Karl Hannemann as Hotelportier
- Harry Hardt as Casino-Geschäftsführer
- S.O. Schoening as Schatz, Juwelier
- Werner Scharf as Spieler
- Gerhard Dammann as Potapytsch, Diener
- Fritz Draeger
- Carl Zickner

== Bibliography ==
- Kreimeier, Klaus (1999). The Ufa Story: A History of Germany's Greatest Film Company, 1918–1945. Berkeley: University of California Press. ISBN 978-0-520-22069-0.
