= Elisabeth and the Fool =

1934 film

- Directed by: Thea von Harbou
- Written by: Walter Reimann; Thea von Harbou
- Produced by: Otto Büsack
- Starring: Hertha Thiele; Theodor Loos; Rudolf Klein-Rogge
- Cinematography: Franz Weihmayr
- Edited by: Fritz C. Mauch
- Music by: Gottfried Huppertz
- Production company: Edda-Film
- Distributed by: Omnium-Film
- Release date: 24 January 1934
- Running time: 76 minutes
- Country: Germany
- Language: German

Elisabeth and the Fool (German: Elisabeth und der Narr) is a 1934 German drama film directed by Thea von Harbou and starring Hertha Thiele, Theodor Loos and Rudolf Klein-Rogge. The film was the directing debut of Harbou, who was known for her screenplays for directors such as Fritz Lang and F. W. Murnau. Filming began on 12 October 1933 in Meersburg and the Lake Constance area. The film's sets were designed by the art directors Kurt Dürnhöfer and Walter Reimann. The film premiered on 24 January 1934.

== Synopsis ==
It tells the story of a young woman at a girls' boarding school attached to a monastery, and the intrigues caused by a man who is obsessed with the monastery's organ.

== Cast ==
- Fritz Alberti as Dietrich, banker
- Hertha Thiele as Elisabeth, his daughter
- Theodor Loos as Thomas, organ player
- Rudolf Klein-Rogge as Michele
- Erna Morena as the abbess
- Eduard Wesener as Edgar Waldorf, painter
- Else Ehser as the housekeeper Hörnlein
- Ilse Nast as the dancer
- Oskar Höcker as the circus manager
- Johanna Ewald as the circus manager's wife
- Klaus Pohl as Clown August
- Gerhard Dammann as Kommissar
- Karl Platen as Ein Kanzleischreiber

== Bibliography ==
- Bock, Hans-Michael & Bergfelder, Tim. The Concise Cinegraph: Encyclopaedia of German Cinema. Berghahn Books, 2009.
- Dixon, Wheeler Winston & Foster, Gwendolyn Audrey. A Short History of Film. Rutgers University Press, 2013.
