= Wibbel the Tailor (play) =

Comedy by Hans Müller-Schlösser

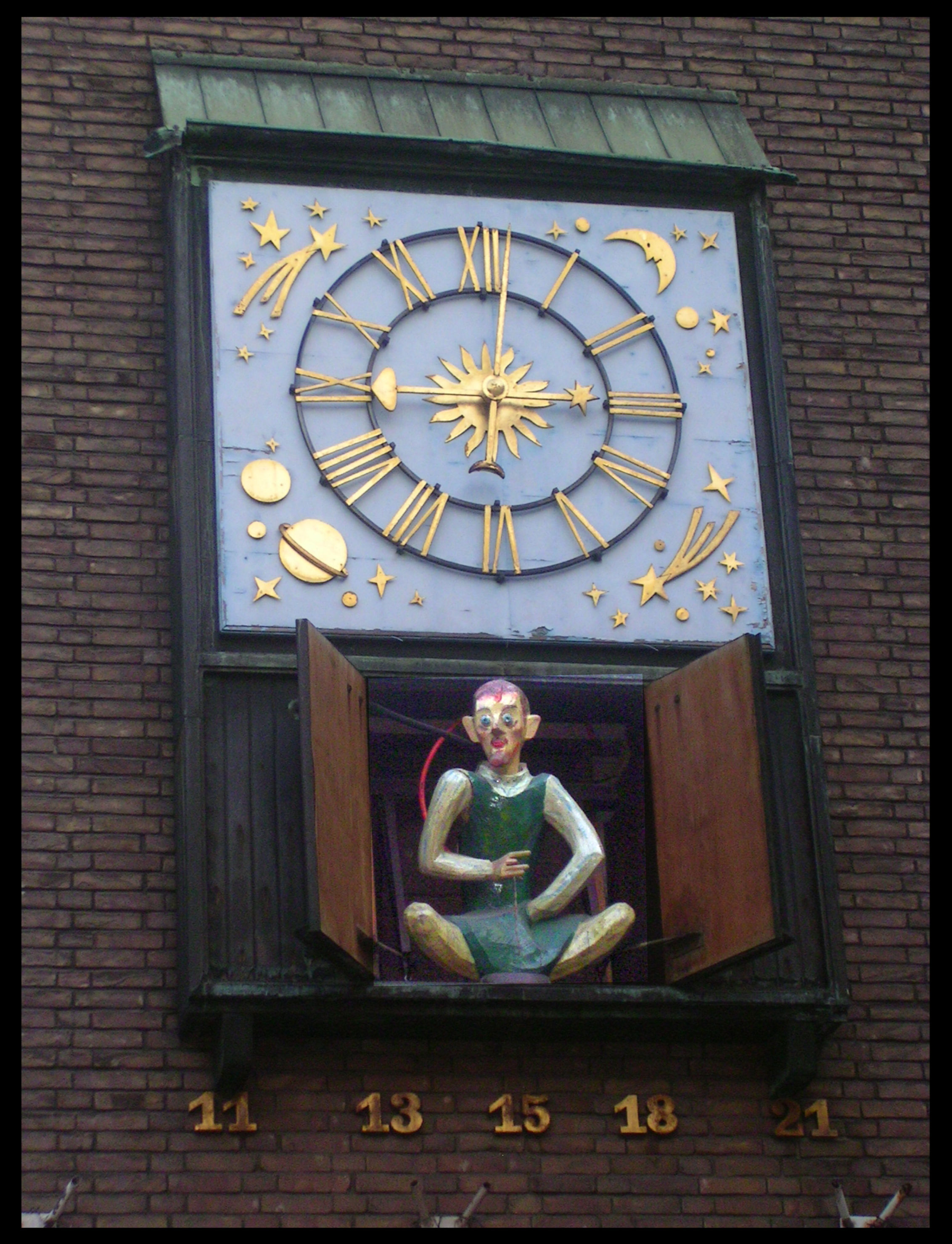
An image of Wibbel on a clock in Düsseldorf

Wibbel the Tailor (German:Schneider Wibbel) is a comedy play by the German writer Hans Müller-Schlösser which was first performed in 1913. The play takes place in Müller-Schlösser's hometown of Düsseldorf during its occupation by French troops during the Napoleonic Wars. From 1913 to 1956, there were fifteen hundred performances of the play in Germany with actor Paul Henckels in the role of Wibbel. Four feature films and an opera have been based on Müller-Schlösser's play, and the character of Anton Wibbel has become a popular symbol of Düsseldorf.

== Plot ==
According to the author, the story goes back to a true story in Berlin from the time of Kaiser Friedrich Wilhelm IV. A master baker had been involved in a drunken knife fight, and had been sentenced to several weeks in jail. The baker persuaded his journeyman assistant to serve the jail sentence in his stead. However, the journeyman dies in prison, and the baker is declared dead. When this becomes known, the Kaiser pardons the baker.

For his play, Müller-Schlösser changed the setting to his hometown of Düsseldorf at the "period of the French occupation" following Napoleon’s conquest of the region in the early 1800s. The baker became Wibbel, a master tailor. While inebriated, Wibbel had insulted the Emperor Napoleon and been sentenced to a jail term. Again, Wibbel persuades his journeyman to serve his sentence, and the journeyman dies while imprisoned. As Wibbel and his wife Fin watch his own funeral from their window, Wibbel remarks (in dialect) "Nä, watt bin ich für ’ne schöne Leich" (literally, "Well, I am a beautiful corpse”). This line from the play has become famous. After a period in hiding, Wibbel returns to his life by claiming to be his own twin brother, and marries his wife Fin. When the French forces withdraw from Düsseldorf, he announces the deception.

== Adaptations ==
The play was a popular hit, and spawned a large number of adaptations such as the 1938 opera Tailor Wibbel by Mark Lothar and several films including:

- Wibbel the Tailor (1920 film), a German silent film directed by Manfred Noa (with Hermann Picha as Wibbel)
- Wibbel the Tailor (1931 film), a German film directed by Paul Henckels (with Paul Henckels as Wibbel)
- Wibbel the Tailor (1939 film), a German film directed by Viktor de Kowa (with Erich Ponto as Wibbel)
- Das Sonntagskind, a 1956 West German film directed by Kurt Meisel (with Heinz Rühmann as Wibbel)
