= The Judas of Tyrol =

1933 film

- Directed by: Franz Osten
- Written by: Hans Curjel; Karl Schönherr (play)
- Starring: Fritz Rasp; Camilla Spira; Marianne Hoppe
- Cinematography: Willy Winterstein
- Edited by: Friedel Buckow
- Music by: Gottfried Huppertz
- Production company: Lothar Stark-Film
- Distributed by: Europa-Filmverleih
- Release date: 21 November 1933
- Running time: 82 minutes
- Country: Germany
- Language: German

The Judas of Tyrol (German: Der Judas von Tirol) is a 1933 German historical drama film directed by Franz Osten and starring Fritz Rasp, Camilla Spira, and Marianne Hoppe. It was shot at the Johannisthal Studios in Berlin. The film's sets were designed by the art director Hans Jacoby. Its Berlin premiere was at the Marmorhaus.

== Plot ==
The film is set in the early nineteenth century, when Tyrol was under foreign occupation. The Tyrolean folk hero Andreas Hofer hides in the village of St Leonhardt, whose residents are preparing to stage their annual Passion Play. The film focuses on Raffl, a young farmhand cast in the role of Judas. Raffl gradually loses the ability to distinguish between role and reality.

== Cast ==
- Fritz Rasp as Raffl
- Camilla Spira as Walpurga
- Marianne Hoppe as Josefa
- Inez Allegri as Vroni
- Fritz Kampers as Jörgel
- Eduard von Winterstein as Kreutzwirt
- Hanns Beck-Gaden as Ein junger Bauer
- Theodor Loos as Ein Komissär
- Oskar Marion as Kommandant
- Rudolf Klein-Rogge as Erster Offizier
- Leopold von Ledebur as Der Oberst
- Carl Wilhelm Tetting as Ein Sergeant
- Hans Hermann Schaufuß as Spielmeister

== Production ==
The film was directed by Franz Osten and composed by Gottfried Huppertz. Camilla Spira, who was Jewish, was interned in a concentration camp after making the film and left Germany after being freed.

== Release ==
Casino Film Exchange re-released the film in the United States in June 1941.

== See also ==
- Raffl (1984)

== Works cited ==
- Waldman, Harry (2008). Nazi Films In America, 1933-1942. McFarland & Company. ISBN 9780786438617.

== Bibliography ==
- Bock, Hans-Michael; Bergfelder, Tim, eds. (2009). The Concise Cinegraph: Encyclopaedia of German Cinema. New York: Berghahn Books. ISBN 978-1-57181-655-9.
- Klaus, Ulrich J. Deutsche Tonfilme: Jahrgang 1933. Klaus-Archiv, 1988.
