= Precious Stones (film) =

- German: Edelsteine
- Directed by: Rudolf Biebrach
- Written by: Robert Wiene
- Produced by: Oskar Messter
- Starring: Paul Bildt; Henny Porten; Paul Hartmann
- Cinematography: Karl Freund
- Music by: Giuseppe Becce
- Production company: Messter Film
- Distributed by: UFA
- Release date: 15 February 1918
- Running time: 69 minutes
- Country: Germany
- Languages: Silent; German intertitles

Precious Stones (German: Edelsteine) is a 1918 German silent drama film directed by Rudolf Biebrach and starring Paul Bildt, Henny Porten and Paul Hartmann.

The film's sets were designed by the art director Ludwig Kainer.

== Cast ==
- Paul Bildt as Der alte Dergan
- Henny Porten as Magdalena Dergan
- Paul Hartmann as Graf Forrest
- Hanna Brohm as Gräfin Forrest
- Theodor Loos as Pieter Swandam

== Bibliography ==
- Bock, Hans-Michael & Bergfelder, Tim. The Concise CineGraph. Encyclopedia of German Cinema. Berghahn Books, 2009.
- Jung, Uli & Schatzberg, Walter. Beyond Caligari: The Films of Robert Wiene. Berghahn Books, 1999.
