= Hatsue Yuasa =

Japanese operatic soprano

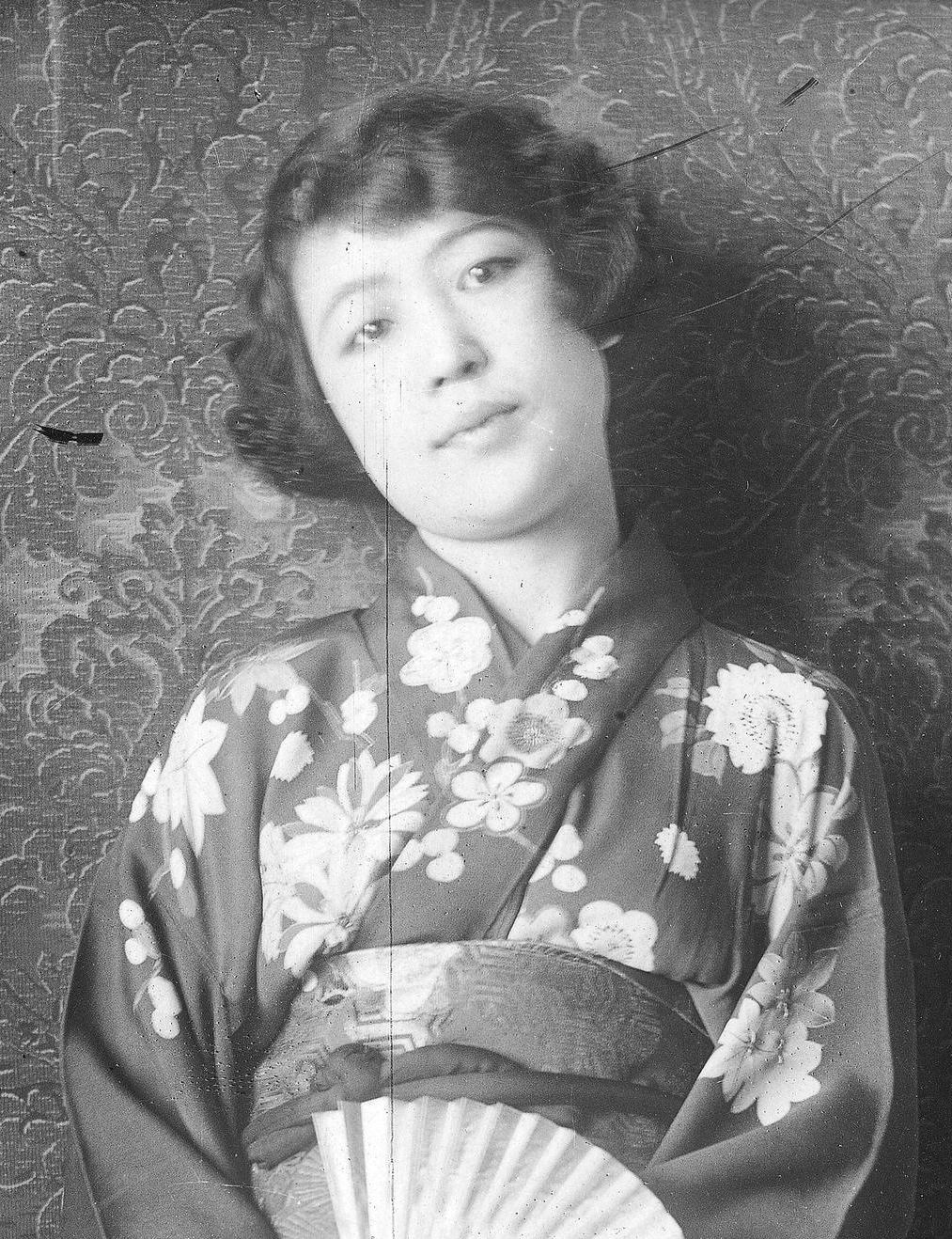
Yuasa in 1925

Hatsue Yuasa (湯浅 初枝, Yuasa Hatsue; 22 June 1902 – after 1943) was a Japanese operatic soprano.

== Life ==
Born in the Prefecture of Tokyo, Yuasa was the daughter of the Marine officer Yuasa Takejirō who died at a young age (1871–1904) sowie der Sakae Yushisaki (1885–1923). After attending the Oberlyzeum in Tokyo, she studied singing at the Imperial Academy of Music in Tokyo from 1919 to 1923. Her teacher was the German-Norwegian musician Hanka Petzold. (1862-1937), former student of Liszt, acknowledged Wagner interpreter and wife of the journalist Bruno Petzold. From 1923 Yuasa continued her training with Ernst Grenzebach and Adolf Philipsen in Berlin.

On 17 July 1926 Yuasa married the Berlin pianist Walther Carl Meiszner (real name: Meißner) whom she had met at her Berlin debut and who subsequently appeared as her piano accompanist. In 1929 the couple lived at Schloßstraße 53 in Charlottenburg; the marriage remained childless. Yuasa's husband died in 1931 at the age of 35.

In Europe it was advertised that Yuasa was a soloist at the Imperial Opera in Tokyo. Between 1925 and 1943 she sang on European stages, mainly in Germany, Austria and Scandinavia. Yuasa often impersonated Madama Butterfly in the opera of the same name by Giacomo Puccini, for example in 1930 at the Lippischen Landestheater Detmold. In the same year she also sang Butterfly at the Salzburger Festspielhaus in a performance with the Mozarteum Orchestra Salzburg. In March 1936 she gave a guest performance in this role at the Hamburg State Opera. Yuasa also sang in concerts. On 8 March 1928, for example, she performed in Bergen with the symphony orchestra there. She sang four opera arias (including the Butterfly aria Un bel dì, vedremo) and six songs, four of which were compositions by her compatriot Kōsaku Yamada. In the same year she gave 24 concerts in England.

The various concert critics expressed their amazement at the ability of a singer from Japan to interpret Western opera music, and often referred to the outward appearance of Yuasa. Thus the Wiener Salonblatt wrote in 1925

As we hear, the "Only Song Recital" of the Japanese singer Hatsue Yuasa is to be followed by a second one; but nevertheless it was a single pleasure to see and hear this charming, foreign human flower. [...] It was astonishing how this Japanese woman was able to empathize with the style of the Occident. We wished our female singers of the same age her accomplished singing, her breathed pianissimo and the moving expression in all shades of human feeling.

In 1926, the journal Neue Zeitschrift für Musik praised the "kimono dressed graceful appearance" as well as the "perfect vocal artistry" of the singer. In the Linzer Tages-Post on the other hand, in 1928 was to be read:

A Pupperl. Such a genuine Japanese doll with sly eyes set apart, porcelain complexion [...], delicate limbs. It has a dense black pageboy's head and is - how cute - fluttered by clouds of rose-red European tulle. A charming miniature. As if to bring the geishap poetry to life. And then the little doll starts to sing, with erotic but droll loving lip movements and a velvety soft voice. Can you hear right? They are Italian arias in the original language, that flows like milk and honey. There she is, the real Madame Butterfly. It's the most loving and beautiful thing I've ever heard.

Among the fans of the "Japanese nightingale" was the playwright Gerhart Hauptmann, who wrote her a letter of thanks after a concert.

Between 1932 and 1934, Yuasa appeared in four German films, including with the popular singer Helge Rosvaenge in the feature film Der Knallenffekt. In it, she helps a singer in the leading role of the opera Le postillon de Lonjumeau to achieve the desired bang effect with a whip by attaching bang snaps to it. In 1933 she appeared in the movie Spiegel, which was produced by Nicholas Kaufmann and was based on a script by Wilhelm Prager. The director of the short film, which showed Japanese life, was her compatriot, the musician Kishi Kōichi (composer) (1909–1937).

Yuasa sang in Germany and German-occupied territories until at least 1943. She gave numerous concerts in Berlin, so in January 1942, when she sang songs by Gluck and Johannes Brahms in the Beethovensaal; at the piano sat Michael Raucheisen. At a concert in Dresden in March 1943 the composer and musician Willy Jaeger (1895-1986) was her accompanist at the piano.

In 1945 a recording was published on which she sang Cherubino from Mozart's Le nozze di Figaro. There is no information about Yuasa's further path in life.
