= Conrad Wiene =

Austrian actor, screenwriter and director

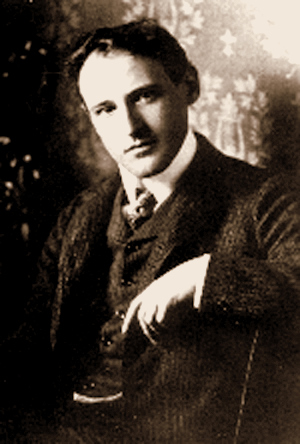
Conrad Wiene c. 1915

Conrad Wiene (German: [ˈviːnə]; 3 February 1878 – after May 1934) was an actor, screenwriter, film producer and director of Austrian and German silent films. He was the younger brother of German film director Robert Wiene.

== Biography ==
Conrad Wiene was born in Vienna, younger son of the successful actor Carl Wiene, in whose footsteps Conrad initially followed as a stage and screen actor. He co-directed his first films with his elder brother Robert, and later made almost twenty feature films, mostly silent. For most of them he also wrote the screenplays

He worked in Berlin, Prague and Breslau (Wrocław) and above all in Vienna, where several of his silent films were shot in the Schönbrunn Studios (Schönbrunn-Ateliers).

His name was connected with the first proposal in 1930 in Vienna to film Lion Feuchtwanger's 1925 historical novel Jud Süß ("Jew Süss"), but the project never reached the production stage.

With the arrival and dominance of sound film, Wiene worked in Germany. After Adolf Hitler took power in Germany in 1933, Wiene, who was Jewish, left Berlin for Vienna. He left Vienna in May 1934 and his subsequent fate is unknown.

== Selected filmography ==
- Eros in Chains, 1932 (director)
- Viennese Waltz, 1932 (director)
- Durchlaucht amüsiert sich, 1931/1932 (director)
- A Waltz by Strauss (1931) (director)
- Madame Bluebeard, 1930/1931 (director and producer)
- Das Geheimnis der Martha Lüders, 1930 (director)
- Eine Dirne ist ermordet worden, 1930 (director); the last Austrian silent film; press screening on February 28, 1930 (Haydn-Kino)
- Eros in Chains, 1929 (director and screenplay)
- Revolution der Jugend, 1929 (director and screenplay)
- The Fourth from the Right (1929) (director)
- Strauss Is Playing Today (Der Walzerkönig), 1928 (director)
- Excluded from the Public (1927) (director)
- Trude, 1926 (director and screenplay)
- Die kleine Dingsda, 1926 (director and screenplay)
- Ich hatt' einen Kameraden, 1926 (director)
- The Clever Fox (1926), (director and screenplay)
- Curfew, 1925 (director and screenplay)
- The Power of Darkness (Die Macht der Finsternis), 1923/1924 (director)
- The Inheritance, 1922(director and screenplay)
- The Testament of Joe Sivers (1922) (director)
- Glanz und Elend der Kurtisanen [1], 1920 (director)
- Glanz und Elend der Kurtisanen [2], 1920 (director)
- Die Spinne, 1919 (director)
- Zwei Welten, 1919 (director and screenplay)
- Am Tor des Lebens, 1918 (director)
- Der Stärkere, 1918 (director and screenplay)
- Der letzte Erbe von Lassa, 1918 (director and screenplay)
- Der vorsichtige Kapitalist, 1918 (director and screenplay)
- Das verschnupfte Miezerl, 1917 (director)
- Dem Frieden entgegen, 1917 (director)
- Frank Boyers Diener, 1917/1918 (director)
- Veilchen Nr. 4, 1917 (director)
- Der Mann im Spiegel, 1916 (director)
- Die Dame mit der Maske, 1916 (director)
- Der Evangelimann, 1914 (director)
- The Weapons of Youth, 1912/1913 (actor)
