= The Shadow of Gaby Leed =

1921 film directed by Carl Boese

- Directed by: Carl Boese
- Written by: Carl Boese
- Starring: Tzwetta Tzatschewa; Otto Gebühr; Frida Richard
- Cinematography: Hans Karl Gottschalk
- Production companies: Bayerische Filmgesellschaft Fett & Wiesel
- Release date: 30 October 1921
- Country: Germany
- Languages: Silent; German intertitles

The Shadow of Gaby Leed (German: Der Schatten der Gaby Leed) is a 1921 German silent film directed by Carl Boese and starring Tzwetta Tzatschewa, Otto Gebühr and Frida Richard.

The film's sets were designed by the art director Julian Ballenstedt.

== Cast ==
- Tzwetta Tzatschewa
- Otto Gebühr
- Frida Richard
- Carl Auen
- Grete Hollmann
- Kurt Vespermann
- Eugen Rex
- Clementine Plessner
- Wilhelm Diegelmann
- Ludwig Rex
- Arnold Marlé
- Robert Martini
- Hans Lanser-Rudolf
- Joachim Ringelnatz

== Bibliography ==
- Bock, Hans-Michael & Bergfelder, Tim. The Concise CineGraph. Encyclopedia of German Cinema. Berghahn Books, 2009.
