= Walther Carl Meiszner =

German classical pianist

Walther Carl Meiszner (born Walther Carl Hermann Meißner 12 November 1896 – 15 November 1931) was a German classical pianist and academic teacher.

== Life ==
=== Family ===
Born in Berlin, he came from the Brandenburg family Meißner, which can be traced back to the beginning of the 18th century in Bochow near Groß Kreutz. He was the son of the physician and medical officer Paul Ludwig Konrad Meißner (8 July 1867 in Schwetz, West Prussia - March 1950 in Charlottenburg) and Alma Köhler, a merchant's daughter (4 October 1869 in Schwetz - 23 November 1935 in Berlin-Charlottenburg). The father was first a doctor in Nowe, West Prussia and was based in Charlottenburg since 1920. Meißner's aunt was the concert singer Lucie Martha Mathilde Meißner (13 June 1862 in Schwetz - 8 December 1898 in Berlin), who had studied piano and singing in Berlin, where she received brilliant reviews including for performing with the Berliner Singakademie in front of William I, German Emperor.

=== Education and career ===
Meißner attended the private school in Neuenburg, West Prussia, then the grammar school in Graudenz. He first studied law at the University of Berlin, but interrupted to devote himself to music. He received musical education from 1913 to 1914 with W. Elisat in Graudenz, then for a year at the West Prussian Conservatory in Danzig. From 1915 to 1916 and 1918 to 1922, he studied piano in Berlin with A. Stark and Moritz Mayer-Mahr, and music theory with Ernst Schauß and Alexander von Fielitz. From 1916 to 1918, Meißner took part in the World War and received the Red Cross Medal in 1919. From 1920 he was a piano teacher at the Stern Conservatory in Berlin, and from 1922 he toured Denmark, Sweden, Finland, Poland, the Czech Republic, Hungary, Yugoslavia, Norway and the U.K., using the stage name Meiszner. The composer Mark Lothar was his piano student from 1921 to 1926. (Note: Several sources, including Munzinger Online, KLfG - Kritisches Lexikon zur fremdsprachigen Gegenwartsliteratur, Neue Deutsche Biographie (NDB), volume 15, p. 233, all erroneously mention "piano lessons with W.C. Meiszner in Dresden".) On 17 July 1926, Meiszner married the Japanese soprano Hatsue Yuasa, whose permanent piano accompanist he became. Due to unknown circumstances Meiszner died shortly after his 35th birthday.

== Work ==
Meiszner was known for interpreting works by Chopin, but played a wide spectrum of composers ranging from Bach to Debussy and his contemporaries such as Ravel and Poulenc, of which concert programs bear witness. Despite his early death, Meiszner was able to record a number of records for the firms Lindström/Odeon, Homophon, Vox and Artiphon from 1922 to 1930, some of them as a soloist, and also playing chamber music with the violinist William Morse, and in a trio formation, the Dajos Béla-Trio, with violinist Dajos Béla and cellist Felix Robert Mendelssohn. He recorded songs with his wife, including "Waldeinsamkeit" by Brahms, "Mariä Wiegenlied" by Otto Helmburghh-Holmes, Tchaikovsky's "Verborgenheit" and Hugo Wolf's "Wiegenlied", sung in Japanese.

According to the record labels, he used instruments from the Berlin piano factory G. Schwechten on some of his recordings.

=== Recordings ===
- Fantasia after Verdi's Rigoletto, Homocord B.8269 (mx. M 50932), in wax: A 10 3 27.
- Fantasia after Bizet's Carmen. Homocord B.8269 (mx. M 50933), in wax: A 28 2 27.
- La Serenata - Leggenda valacca (Gaetano Braga / Marco M. Marcello). Dajos Béla-Trio. Odeon AA 79706 / O-7060 (mx. xxBo 7761)
- Ombra mai fu, Arioso from Handel's Serse. Dajos Béla-Trio, recorded January 1923.
- Im alten Stil by L. Mendelssohn. Felix Robert Mendelssohn, cello, Walther Carl Meiszner. Odeon AA 79030 / O-6217 (mx. xxBo 7766), recorded January 1923.
