= Annemarie and Her Cavalryman =

1926 film by Erich Eriksen

- Directed by: Erich Eriksen
- Written by: Alexander Alexander
- Starring: Colette Brettel; Sig Arno; Hans Junkermann
- Cinematography: Willy Großstück
- Music by: Felix Bartsch
- Production company: Ama-Film
- Distributed by: Ama-Film
- Release date: 20 August 1926
- Running time: 70 minutes
- Country: Germany
- Languages: Silent; German intertitles

Annemarie and Her Cavalryman (German: Annemarie und ihr Ulan) is a 1926 German silent romantic comedy film directed by Erich Eriksen and starring Colette Brettel, Sig Arno, and Hans Junkermann. The film's sets were designed by the art director Karl Machus.

== Cast ==
- Colette Brettel as Terry von Struppwitz
- Sig Arno as Günther Bock, Einjähriger bei den Ulanan
- Hans Junkermann as Oberstleutnant Strupp von Struppwitz
- Else Wasa as Frau Strupp
- Julius Falkenstein as Oberleutnant von Gelbsattel
- Carl Auen as Leutnant Aribert Graf von Nedlitz
- Kurt Gerron as Wachtmeister
- Paul Samson-Körner as Karl Lehmann, Stubenältester
- Paul Westermeier as Paul Lehmann, Ulan, Karls Bruder
- Ellen Plessow as Gräfin Nedlitz auf Borstenfeld
- Hermann Picha as Jochen, der Gräfins Kammerdiener
- Tzwetta Tzatschewa as Benita, eine Tänzerin vom Maxim
- Henry Bender as Kommissionsrat Julius Bock, Besitzer einer Drogerie
- Emmy Wyda as Frau Bock
- Evi Eva as Käthe, Bocks Tochter
- Hanne Brinkmann as Annemarie, Bocks Köchin
- Gerhard Ritterband as August, Bocks Lehrling
- Karl Harbacher as Klohndiener

== Bibliography ==
- Felsmann, Barbara; Prümm, Karl (1992). Kurt Gerron – gefeiert und gejagt. Berlin: Hentrich. ISBN 978-3-89468-027-5.
