= A Summer You Will Never Forget =

1959 film

- A Summer You Will Never Forget cover
- German: Ein Sommer, den man nie vergißt
- Directed by: Werner Jacobs
- Written by: Franz Marischka; Georg Marischka
- Based on: a novel by Marion Jahn
- Produced by: Alexander Golling
- Starring: Claus Biederstaedt; Antje Geerk; Karin Dor
- Cinematography: Franz Weihmayr
- Edited by: Adolf Schlyssleder
- Music by: Willy Mattes
- Production company: Astra Filmkunst
- Distributed by: Prisma Film
- Release date: 18 December 1959
- Running time: 92 minutes
- Country: West Germany
- Language: German

A Summer You Will Never Forget (German: Ein Sommer, den man nie vergißt) is a 1959 West German drama film directed by Werner Jacobs and starring Claus Biederstaedt, Antje Geerk and Karin Dor. It was based on a novel by Marion Jahn.

It was shot around Wörthersee in the Austrian state of Carinthia. The film's sets were designed by the art directors Franz Bi and Carl Ludwig Kirmse. It was shot using Eastmancolor.

== Main cast ==
- Claus Biederstaedt as Ernst Leuchtenthal
- Antje Geerk as Marianne
- Karin Dor as Christine von Auffenberg
- Fita Benkhoff as Therese Leuchtenthal
- Heli Finkenzeller as Mrs. Dr.Manning
- Carl Wery as Fürst Aufenberger
- Alexander Golling as Konsul Leuchtenthal
- Eddi Arent as Ruprecht
- Helga Martin as Anni
- Benno Kusche as Dr. Bachmeier Tierarzt
- Sascha Hehn as Peter Bachmeier
