= A Waltz by Strauss (1931 film) =

1931 film

- German film poster
- German: So lang' noch ein Walzer vom Strauß erklingt
- Directed by: Conrad Wiene
- Written by: Paul Beyer
- Produced by: Herbert Silbermann
- Starring: Hans Junkermann; Gustav Fröhlich; Julia Serda
- Cinematography: Carl Drews
- Edited by: Herbert Selpin
- Music by: Artur Guttmann
- Production company: Splendid Film Company
- Release date: 2 October 1931
- Running time: 90 minutes
- Country: Germany
- Language: German

A Waltz by Strauss or As Long as Strauss Waltzes are Heard (German: So lang' noch ein Walzer vom Strauß erklingt) is a 1931 German historical musical film directed by Conrad Wiene and starring Hans Junkermann, Gustav Fröhlich and Julia Serda. It was shot at the Johannisthal Studios in Berlin. The film's sets were designed by the art director Willy Schiller. In the United Kingdom it was released as Johann Strauss.

== Cast ==
- Hans Junkermann as Johann Strauss I
- Gustav Fröhlich as Johann Strauss II
- Julia Serda as Strauss's mother
- Maria Paudler as Lisl Deisinger
- Fritz Spira as Der Lamperl-Hirsch - Hofrat
- Ferdinand Bonn as Drechsler, cathedral organist
- Alexander Murski as Grand Duke Sergej
- Valerie Boothby as Jelisaweta, his daughter
- Irma Godau as Die Trampusch - Prima-Ballerina at the Theater am Kärntnertor
- Fritz Greiner as Deisinger, chief baker
- Nora Hofmann as Deisinger's wife
- Edmund Binder as The Lord Teacher
- Julius Falkenstein as The Lord Critic
- Ernst Wurmser as caretaker
- Dolly Lorenz as cheerful singer
- Ernst Pittschau as groom
