= Hanne Brinkmann =

German actress (1895–1984)

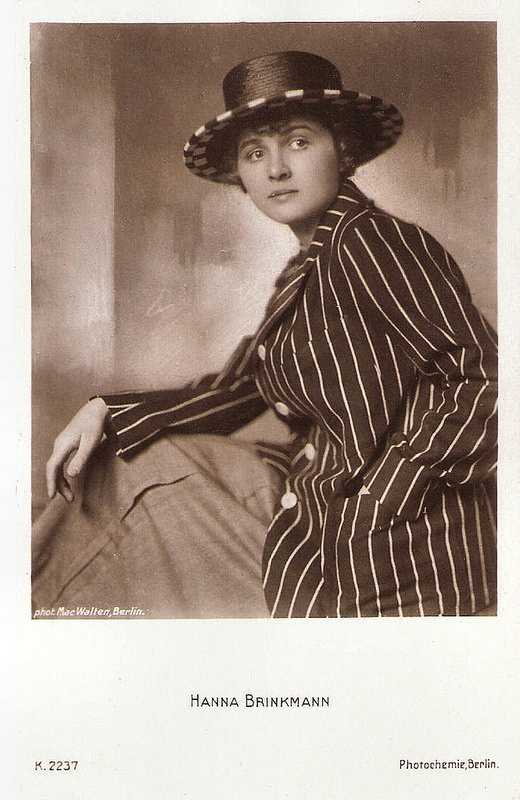
- Born: Johanna Marie Luise Elisabeth Brinkmann; 22 September 1895; Hanover, Germany
- Died: 29 July 1984 (aged 88); Munich, Germany
- Other name: Hanne Brinkmann-Schünzel
- Occupation: Actress
- Years active: 1915-1929

Hanne Brinkmann (born Johanna Marie Luise Elisabeth Brinkmann; 22 September 1895 – 29 July 1984) was a German actress. She appeared in 24 films between 1915 and 1929.

== Selected filmography ==
- Laugh Bajazzo (1915)
- The Unmarried Woman (1917)
- Devoted Artists (1919)
- During My Apprenticeship (1919)
- The Duty to Live (1919)
- The Girl and the Men (1919)
- Catherine the Great (1920)
- The Last Hour (1921)
- Mother and Child (1924)
- Annemarie and Her Cavalryman (1926)
- Countess Ironing-Maid (1926)
- U-9 Weddigen (1927)
- The Weavers (1927)
- Dyckerpotts' Heirs (1928)
- What's Wrong with Nanette? (1929)
