= Love (1919 German film) =

- Directed by: Manfred Noa
- Written by: Margarete-Maria Langen
- Produced by: Franz Vogel
- Starring: Reinhold Schünzel; Tzwetta Tzatschewa
- Cinematography: Paul Adler
- Production company: Eiko Film
- Release date: December 1919
- Country: Germany
- Languages: Silent; German intertitles

Love (German: Liebe) is a 1919 German silent film directed by Manfred Noa and starring Reinhold Schünzel and Tzwetta Tzatschewa.

The film's sets were designed by the art director Karl Machus.

== Cast ==
- Reinhold Schünzel as Herbert Warfield
- Tzwetta Tzatschewa as Dorothy Hall
- Jeanette Bethge as Garderobiere
- Bruno Harprecht as James Illing
- Karl Platen as Erster Sekretär bei Illing
- Fritz Richard as Flüchtling Alvadres
- Heinz Sarnow as Robert

== Bibliography ==
- Bock, Hans-Michael & Bergfelder, Tim. The Concise CineGraph. Encyclopedia of German Cinema. Berghahn Books, 2009.
