= Chronicles of the Gray House =

1925 film

- Theatrical release poster
- Directed by: Arthur von Gerlach
- Screenplay by: Thea von Harbou
- Based on: A Chapter in the History of Grieshuus by Theodor Storm
- Produced by: Erich Pommer
- Starring: Paul Hartmann; Rudolf Forster; Lil Dagover
- Cinematography: Fritz Arno Wagner; Carl Drews; Erich Nitzschmann
- Music by: Gottfried Huppertz
- Production company: UFA
- Distributed by: UFA
- Release date: 11 February 1925
- Running time: 109 minutes
- Country: Germany
- Languages: Silent; German intertitles

Full movie

Chronicles of the Gray House (German: Zur Chronik von Grieshuus) is a 1925 German silent historical drama film directed by Arthur von Gerlach and starring Paul Hartmann, Rudolf Forster and Lil Dagover.

It is also known as At the Grey House. The narrative is set in the 17th century and follows the intrigues when the son of a feudal landowner falls in love with the daughter of one of the serfs, causing his younger brother to see an opportunity for himself. The screenplay by Thea von Harbou is based on Theodor Storm's novella A Chapter in the History of Grieshuus.

Erich Pommer produced the film for Universum Film AG. Principal photography took place from May 1923 to November 1924 around the Lüneburg Heath and Neubabelsberg. The film's sets were designed by the art directors Robert Herlth and Walter Röhrig. The premiere took place in Berlin on 11 February 1925.

== Cast ==
- Arthur Kraußneck as Burgherr von Grieshuus
- Paul Hartmann as Junker Hinrich
- Rudolf Forster as Junker Detlev
- Rudolf Rittner as Owe Heiken
- Lil Dagover as Bärbe
- Gertrude Welcker as Gesine
- Gertrud Arnold as Matte
- Hanspeter Peterhans as Enzio
- Christian Bummerstedt as Christof
- Josef Peterhans as Bereiter

== Bibliography ==
- Bock, Hans-Michael & Bergfelder, Tim. The Concise CineGraph. Encyclopedia of German Cinema. Berghahn Books, 2009.
