= The Inheritance (1922 film) =

1922 film

- Directed by: Conrad Wiene
- Written by: Conrad Wiene
- Starring: Rudolf Forster; Philipp Manning; Louis Ralph
- Production company: Eiko Film
- Release date: 1922
- Country: Germany
- Languages: Silent; German intertitles

The Inheritance (German: Das Erbe) is a 1922 German silent drama film directed by Conrad Wiene and starring Rudolf Forster, Philipp Manning and Louis Ralph.

The film's sets were designed by the art director Karl Machus.

== Cast ==
- Rudolf Forster
- Philipp Manning
- Louis Ralph
- Lili Alexandra
- Fritz Karchow
- Georg August Koch
- Hedwig Pauly-Winterstein

== Bibliography ==
- Parish, Robert. Film Actors Guide. Scarecrow Press, 1977.
