= A Doctor of Conviction (1959 film) =

1959 film directed by Werner Klingler

- Directed by: Werner Klingler
- Written by: Johann Alexander Hübler-Kahla
- Based on: A Doctor of Conviction by Karl Unselt
- Produced by: Gustl Gotzler; Johann Alexander Hübler-Kahla
- Starring: Adrian Hoven; Willy Birgel; Antje Geerk; Ellen Schwiers
- Cinematography: Erich Claunigk
- Edited by: Caspar van den Berg
- Music by: Horst Dempwolff
- Production company: Hübler-Kahla Film
- Distributed by: Neue Filmverleih
- Release date: 21 August 1959
- Running time: 90 minutes
- Country: West Germany
- Language: German

A Doctor of Conviction (German: Arzt aus Leidenschaft) is a 1959 West German drama film directed by Werner Klingler and starring Adrian Hoven, Willy Birgel, Antje Geerk and Ellen Schwiers. It was shot at the Göttingen Studios in Lower Saxony. The film's sets were designed by the art directors Max Mellin and Theo Zwierski. It is based on the 1935 novel of the same title by Karl Unselt, which had previously been made into the 1936 film A Doctor of Conviction.

== Cast ==
- Adrian Hoven as Dr. Manfred Wiegand
- Willy Birgel as Staatsanwalt Perschke
- Klausjürgen Wussow as Dr. Wolfgang Friedberg
- Antje Geerk as Elisabeth Massmann
- Carl Wery as Professor Ruge
- Ellen Schwiers as Oberschwester Hilde
- Erica Beer as Margot, eine Barfrau
- Jan Hendriks as Felix Friedberg
- Lucie Mannheim as Frau Friedberg - seine Mutter
- Paul Hoffmann as Generaldirektor Massmann
- Edith Hancke as Schwester Elvira
- Theodor Danegger as Friedrich, Pförtner im Krankenhaus
- Ernst Brasch as Gerngroß, Pfleger
- Rolf von Nauckhoff as Kriminalinspektor Krüger
- Peter Kuiper as Toni
- Ilse Pagé as Ein junges Mädchen
- Heinz Bennent as Walter Wichert

== Bibliography ==
- Frank, Stefanie Mathilde. Wiedersehen im Wirtschaftswunder: Remakes von Filmen aus der Zeit des Nationalsozialismus in der Bundesrepublik 1949–1963. V&R Unipress, 2017.
- Klaus, Ulrich J. Deutsche Tonfilme: Jahrgang 1936. Klaus-Archiv, 1988.
