= Our Daily Bread (1926 film) =

1926 film

- Directed by: Constantin J. David
- Written by: Hans Behrendt; Mutz Greenbaum
- Produced by: Herman Millakowsky
- Starring: Fritz Kampers; Mary Nolan; Dina Gralla
- Cinematography: Mutz Greenbaum
- Music by: Hansheinrich Dransmann
- Production company: Greenbaum-Film
- Distributed by: Veritas-Film
- Release date: 30 March 1926
- Country: Germany
- Languages: Silent; German intertitles

Our Daily Bread (German: Unser täglich Brot) is a 1926 German silent drama film directed by Constantin J. David and starring Fritz Kampers, Mary Nolan and Dina Gralla.

The film's sets were designed by Karl Machus.

== Plot summary ==
The film centers on the daily lives and struggles of a group of workers in a small German town. They face poverty, unemployment, and various hardships, but also find moments of hope and solidarity. The film portrays their efforts to survive and support each other in difficult economic conditions.

== Cast ==
- Fritz Kampers
- Mary Nolan as The school teacher
- Dina Gralla
- Elza Temary
- Harry Nestor
- Leona Bergere
- Paul Rehkopf
- Paul Hartmann as Overseer
- Hans Mierendorff as Tagger

== Bibliography ==
- Hans-Michael Bock and Tim Bergfelder. The Concise Cinegraph: An Encyclopedia of German Cinema. Berghahn Books.
