= Karl Machus =

German art director

- Born: 17 December 1884; Berlin, German Empire
- Died: 24 May 1944 (aged 59); Berlin, Germany
- Occupation: Art director
- Years active: 1918 - 1944 (film)

Karl Machus (1884–1944) was a German art director. Along with Erich Zander he designed the sets for most of the films made by director Veit Harlan during the Nazi era.

== Selected filmography ==
- Prince Cuckoo (1919)
- Blonde Poison (1919)
- Love (1919)
- The Night of Decision (1920)
- Hate (1920)
- Battle of the Sexes (1920)
- The Story of a Maid (1921)
- Sons of the Night (1921)
- The Inheritance (1922)
- The Testament of Joe Sivers (1922)
- The Duke of Aleria (1923)
- The Emperor's Old Clothes (1923)
- The Blame (1924)
- The Tragedy of the Dishonoured (1924)
- Two Children (1924)
- The Iron Bride (1925)
- Oh Those Glorious Old Student Days (1925)
- Reveille: The Great Awakening (1925)
- Love's Joys and Woes (1926)
- Watch on the Rhine (1926)
- We'll Meet Again in the Heimat (1926)
- Annemarie and Her Cavalryman (1926)
- Our Daily Bread (1926)
- Department Store Princess (1926)
- The False Prince (1927)
- Orient Express (1927)
- The Eighteen Year Old (1927)
- Endangered Girls (1927)
- U-9 Weddigen (1927)
- The Great Unknown (1927)
- Eva in Silk (1928)
- Lemke's Widow (1928)
- The Page Boy at the Golden Lion (1928)
- The Market of Life (1928)
- Children of the Street (1929)
- They May Not Marry (1929)
- Painted Youth (1929)
- Three Days of Life and Death (1929)
- Spell of the Looking Glass (1932)
- Viennese Waltz (1932)
- Three Bluejackets and a Blonde (1933)
- Ripening Youth (1933)
- A Doctor of Conviction (1936)
- The Hour of Temptation (1936)
- The Ways of Love Are Strange (1937)
- Revolutionary Wedding (1938)
- The Golden Mask (1939)
- Robert and Bertram (1939)

== Bibliography ==
- Noack, Frank. Veit Harlan: The Life and Work of a Nazi Filmmaker. University Press of Kentucky, 2016.
