= Wibbel the Tailor (1931 film) =

1931 film

- Directed by: Paul Henckels
- Written by: Hans Müller-Schlösser (play); Walter Schlee; Walter Wassermann
- Starring: Paul Henckels; Thea Grodyn; Wolfgang Zilzer; Harry Berber
- Cinematography: Willy Hameister
- Music by: Willy Schmidt-Gentner
- Production company: Aco-Film
- Distributed by: Albö-Film
- Release date: 5 January 1931
- Running time: 84 minutes
- Country: Germany
- Language: German

Wibbel the Tailor (German: Schneider Wibbel) is a 1931 German comedy film directed by Paul Henckels and starring Henckels, Thea Grodyn, and Wolfgang Zilzer. It is an adaptation of the 1913 play of the same title by Hans Müller-Schlösser. There are no copies of the film known.

== Cast ==
- Paul Henckels as Schneider Wibbel
- Thea Grodyn as Fina
- Wolfgang Zilzer as Schneidergeselle Zimpel
- Harry Berber as Mölfes
- Ferdinand Hart as Heubes - Oberst der Schützengarde
- Hermann Vallentin as Meunier
- Hugo Fischer-Köppe as Stadtpolizist
- Friedrich Ettel as Küfermeister Krönkel
- Fritz Odemar as Fitzke
- Maria Krahn as Frau Fitzke
- Max Wilmsen as Pangdich
- Gaston Briese as Knipperling
- Albert Walter as Fläsch - Hausierer
- Till Klockow as Hopp-Majänn
- Ferdinand von Alten as Piccard
- Wilhelm Graefe as Wirt
- Josef Dahmen as Sohn des Wirts
- Franz Stein as Nachtwächter

== Bibliography ==
- Grange, William (2008). Cultural Chronicle of the Weimar Republic. Lanham, Maryland, USA: Scarecrow Press. ISBN 9780810859678. OCLC 1087790380.
