= The Pearl of the Orient =

1921 film directed by Karlheinz Martin

- Directed by: Karlheinz Martin
- Written by: Karlheinz Martin; Max Monato
- Starring: Viggo Larsen; Carola Toelle; Tzwetta Tzatschewa; Ferdinand von Alten
- Cinematography: Willy Gaebel; Erich Waschneck
- Production company: Messter Film
- Distributed by: UFA
- Release date: 12 August 1921
- Country: Germany
- Languages: Silent; German intertitles

The Pearl of the Orient (German: Die Perle des Orients) is a 1921 German silent adventure film directed by Karlheinz Martin and starring Viggo Larsen, Carola Toelle and Tzwetta Tzatschewa. It premiered in Berlin on 12 August 1921.

== Cast ==
- Viggo Larsen as Maharadscha von Shivaji
- Carola Toelle as Inge, seine Frau
- Tzwetta Tzatschewa as Lieblingssklavin Sidara
- Ferdinand von Alten as Radscha von Singalundi
- Lewis Brody as Diener des Radschas
- Magda Madeleine
- H. von Maixdorff
- Rolf Prasch
- Loni Nest

== Bibliography ==
- Grange, William. Cultural Chronicle of the Weimar Republic.Scarecrow Press, 2008.
