= Tresi Rudolph =

German actor, singer and opera singer

Tresi Rudolph (18 August 1911 – 22 January 1997) was a German operatic soprano, actress and singing teacher.

== Life ==
Born in Göttingen, Rudolph took singing lessons in her hometown with Ernst Grenzebach at the age of 15 and went to Berlin at 17, where she continued her singing education. At the age of 21 she was accepted at the Berlin State Opera im Unter den Linden Four years later she changed to the Deutsches Opernhaus (today Deutsche Oper Berlin), where she celebrated triumphs. In 1938 she was awarded the title Kammersängerin. She belonged to the ensemble of the Deutsches Opernhaus until the closure of the stage in summer 1944.

After the war she had various engagements besides tours within Germany and other European countries, including again at the Berlin State Opera and especially at the Hamburg State Opera.

Rudolph began her career as a coloratura soprano with roles like Papagena (The Magic Flute) and Musette (La Bohème). Over the years her voice developed into a lyrical-dramatic soprano. At the Deutsches Opernhaus as well as later in Hamburg and elsewhere, she sang many of the great roles of her profession such as Nedda (Bajazzo), Cho-Cho-San (Madama Butterfly), Violetta (La traviata), Mimi (La Bohème), Georgette (Il tabarro), Tosca, Aida, Agathe (Der Freischütz), and Carmen.

Beyond her stage work she became known to a large circle of listeners through records and countless radio recordings. In 1936 she got the leading role in Josef von Báky's film comedy Intermezzo, in which she sings Viva el Torero! and Für jede Frau gibt's einen Mann auf Erden by Theo Mackeben. It remained her only appearance in a film.

In 1959 she ended her career as a singer in order to dedicate herself to vocal pedagogy.

In the early 1960s she went to Colombia with her husband, the conductor Alfred Hering. There she accepted a teaching position for several years as professor of the singing class at the Conservatory of Tolima.

Rudolph died in Hamburg at the age of 86.
