= Manfred Noa =

German film director

- Born: 22 March 1893; Berlin, German Empire
- Died: 5 December 1930 (aged 37); Berlin, Weimar Germany
- Occupation: Film director
- Years active: 1916 - 1930
- Relatives: Loo Hardy (sister)

Manfred Noa (22 March 1893 – 5 December 1930) was a German film director. Noa was described by Vilma Bánky, who he directed twice, as her "favourite director". Noa's 1924 film Helena has been called his "masterpiece" although it was so expensive that it seriously damaged the finances of its production company Bavaria Film.

A film and art director later specialised in historical films, Noa is perhaps best known today for his 1922 film Nathan the Wise, an adaptation of Gotthold Ephraim Lessing's 1779 play of the same title, which made a plea for religious tolerance. He was the third husband of the actress Eva May, who was the daughter of his fellow director Joe May and actress Mia May. Noa died 5 December 1930 in Berlin of peritonitis.

== Selected filmography ==
- The Uncanny House (1916)
- The Diamond Foundation (1917)
- The Lord of Hohenstein (1917)
- Love (1919)
- The Girl and the Men (1919)
- Wibbel the Tailor (1920)
- Hate (1920)
- Sons of the Night (1921)
- Nathan the Wise (1922)
- Helena (1924)
- The Wonderful Adventure (1924)
- Should We Get Married? (1925)
- Young Blood (1926)
- Wrath of the Seas (1926)
- The Uncle from the Provinces (1926)
- Why Get a Divorce? (1926)
- Die Dame von Paris (1927)
- Queen of the Boulevards (1927)
- The Eighteen Year Old (1927)
- Casanova's Legacy (1928)
- The Lady and the Chauffeur (1928)
- Modern Pirates (1928)
- Revolt in the Batchelor's House (1929)
- My Sister and I (1929)
- Mon coeur incognito (1930)
- Der Walzerkönig (1930)
- Road to Rio (1931)
- La regina di Sparta (1931)

== Bibliography ==
- Eisner, Lotte H. The Haunted Screen: Expressionism in the German Cinema and the Influence of Max Reinhardt. University of California Press, 2008.
- Kester, Bernadette. Film Front Weimar: Representations of the First World War in German films of the Weimar Period (1919-1933). Amsterdam University Press, 2003.
- Prawer, S.S. Between Two Worlds: The Jewish Presence in German and Austrian Film, 1910-1933. Berghahn Books, 2007.
- Schildgen, Rachel A. More Than A Dream: Rediscovering the Life and Films of Vilma Banky. 1921 PVG Publishing, 2010.
