= Helena (1924 film) =

1924 film by Manfred Noa

- French poster
- Directed by: Manfred Noa
- Written by: Homer (poem); Hans Kyser
- Starring: Edy Darclea; Vladimir Gajdarov; Albert Steinrück; Adele Sandrock
- Cinematography: Ewald Daub; Gustave Preiss
- Production company: Bavaria Film
- Distributed by: Bavaria Film
- Release dates: 21 January 1924 (Part I); 4 February 1924 (Part II)
- Running time: 204 minutes
- Country: Germany
- Languages: Silent; German intertitles

Helena is a 1924 German epic silent drama film directed by Manfred Noa and starring Edy Darclea, Vladimir Gajdarov and Albert Steinrück. The film was based on the poem the Iliad by Homer. It was released in two separate parts: The Rape of Helen and The Fall of Troy. It was produced by Bavaria Film at the Emelka Studios in Munich. The film was made on an epic scale with thousands of extras, and large sets which rivalled those of the larger Berlin-based UFA. For many years the film was considered partially lost until it was reconstructed from a version found in Swiss archives. The film has been described as Noa's "masterpiece," although it was so expensive that it seriously damaged the finances of Bavaria Film.

Full movie

== Cast ==
- Edy Darclea as Helena
- Vladimir Gajdarov as Paris
- Albert Steinrück as Priamos
- Adele Sandrock as Hekabe
- Carl de Vogt as Hektor
- Friedrich Ulmer as Menelaos
- Carlo Aldini as Achille
- Carl Lamac as Patroklos
- Karl Wüstenhagen as Agamemnon
- Hanna Ralph as Andromache
- Albert Bassermann as Aisakos
- Ferdinand Martini as Agelaos
- Rudolf Meinhard-Jünger as Tersites
- Otto Kronburger as Ulises

== Bibliography ==
- Schildgen, Rachel A. More Than A Dream: Rediscovering the Life and Films of Vilma Banky. 1921 PVG Publishing, Hollywood, CA, 2010, ISBN 0982770928.
- Winkler, Martin M (ed.). Troy: From Homer's Iliad to Hollywood Epic. John Wiley & Sons, 2009.
