= The Japanese Woman =

1919 film by Ewald André Dupont

- Directed by: Ewald André Dupont
- Written by: Ewald André Dupont
- Starring: Max Landa; Manja Tzatschewa; Conrad Veidt
- Cinematography: Charles Paulus
- Production company: Stern-Film
- Release date: 24 January 1919
- Country: Germany
- Languages: Silent; German intertitles

The Japanese Woman (German: Die Japanerin) is a 1919 German silent mystery film directed by Ewald André Dupont and starring Max Landa, Manja Tzatschewa and Conrad Veidt.

The film's sets were designed by the Hungarian art director Eugen Stolzer.

== Cast ==
- Max Landa as Detektiv
- Conrad Veidt as The Secretary
- Leopold von Ledebur as Robert Raymond
- Helene Voß as Lieschen
- Manja Tzatschewa as Mau-Fo
- Bernhard Goetzke as Arabischer Diener im Hause Raymonds
- Ria Jende as Mary
- Rose Lichtenstein as Stubenmädchen
- Camilo Sacchetto as Henry Clavering
- Marie Grimm-Einödshofer
- Karl Platen
- Loni Pyrmont

== Bibliography ==
- John T. Soister. Conrad Veidt on Screen: A Comprehensive Illustrated Filmography. McFarland, 2002.
