= Mark Lothar =

German composer

Mark Lothar [ló:tar] (born Lothar Hundertmark; 23 May 1902 in Berlin – 6 April 1985 in Munich) was a German composer.

== Life ==
From 1921 to 1926, he studied piano with Franz Schreker and Walther Carl Meiszner in Berlin and with Ermanno Wolf-Ferrari in Munich. Early on he became famous accompanying singers such as Erna Berger, Corry Nera, who in 1934 on became his wife, and Hermann Prey. In 1933 he was recruited as a music specialist for the German Theater by Max Reinhardt, since Lothar was a member of the Kampfbund für deutsche Kultur, an antisemitic organization forming part of the Völkisch movement. One year later he became the musical director of the Prussian State Theater in Berlin thanks to Gustaf Gründgens. He held this position until 1944. During his tenure, he composed various pieces on behalf of Joseph Goebbels. In May 1938 his opera Tailor Wibbel, inspired by a play by Hans Müller-Schlösser, was performed at the Berlin State Opera. In August 1944, Adolf Hitler included in the Gottbegnadeten list, an exclusive list of artists exempt from military service.

Since 1945 he worked for the Bavarian state theater and since 1955 as free composer based in Munich.

He was also renown as a composer of theater and film music (e.g. form Friedemann Bach, Holiday in Tyrol and Faust by Gustaf Gründgens) and of songs to text from Hermann Löns, Hermann Hesse, Joachim Ringelnatz, Christian Morgenstern and other German poets.

His grave is located on the Solln Cemetery in Munich.

== Selected filmography ==
- The Devil and Circe (1921)
- The False Step (1939)
- Friedemann Bach (1941)
- Nora (1944)
- Keepers of the Night (1949)
- The White Hell of Pitz Palu (1950)
- The Great Temptation (1952)
- His Royal Highness (1953)
- Beloved Enemy (1955)
- Devil in Silk (1956)
- Regine (1956)
- And Lead Us Not Into Temptation (1957)
- Made in Germany (1957)
