= Franz Vogel =

German film producer (1883–1956)

- Born: 9 December 1883; Berlin, German Empire
- Died: 4 October 1956 (aged 72); West Berlin, West Germany
- Occupation: Producer
- Years active: 1912-1954 (film)

Franz Vogel (1883–1956) was a German film producer. In 1912 he established Eiko Film which enjoyed success during the First World War. In 1913 the company constructed the Marienfelde Studios in Berlin.

== Selected filmography ==
- His Coquettish Wife (1916)
- The Unmarried Woman (1917)
- The Bracelet (1918)
- Love (1919)
- The Girl and the Men (1919)
- Battle of the Sexes (1920)
- Wibbel the Tailor (1920)
- Hate (1920)
- Sons of the Night (1921)
- The Testament of Joe Sivers (1922)
- The Iron Bride (1925)
- The Catwalk (1927)
- The Two Seals (1934)
- His Late Excellency (1935)
- The Accusing Song (1936)
- A Doctor of Conviction (1936)
- The Gambler (1938)
- Sergeant Berry (1938)
- Revolutionary Wedding (1938)
- A Man Astray (1940)
- The Black Robe (1944)
- Search for Majora (1949)
- Madonna in Chains (1949)
- Wedding with Erika (1950)

== Bibliography ==
- Hans-Michael Bock and Tim Bergfelder. The Concise Cinegraph: An Encyclopedia of German Cinema. Berghahn Books.
