= Eiko Film =

Historic German film company

Eiko Film was a German film production company of the silent era. It was established in 1912 by the producer Franz Vogel and swiftly became one of Germany's more important companies. Having initially produced its films at the Rex Film studios in Berlin, the company moved to construct the Marienfelde Studios in the suburb of that name. A glasshouse studio, it was part of Germany's growing film infrastructure. During the First World War era, when foreign imports were largely excluded from the German market, the company enjoyed success with its productions. In 1922, the company and its Marienfelde Studios were acquired by Terra Film, although the name Eiko was used by productions released by the rival National Film until later in the decade.

== Selected filmography ==
- Bismarck (1914)
- His Coquettish Wife (1916)
- The Unmarried Woman (1917)
- The Adventures of Captain Hansen (1917)
- The Bracelet (1918)
- Love (1919)
- The Girl and the Men (1919)
- Wibbel the Tailor (1920)
- Sons of the Night (1921)
- The Inheritance (1922)

== Bibliography ==
- Elsaesser, Thomas & Wedel, Michael (ed.). A Second Life: German Cinema's First Decades. Amsterdam University Press, 1996.
- Kreimeier, Klaus. The Ufa Story: A History of Germany's Greatest Film Company, 1918–1945.University of California Press, 1999.
