= Hans Müller-Schlösser =

German poet and playwright

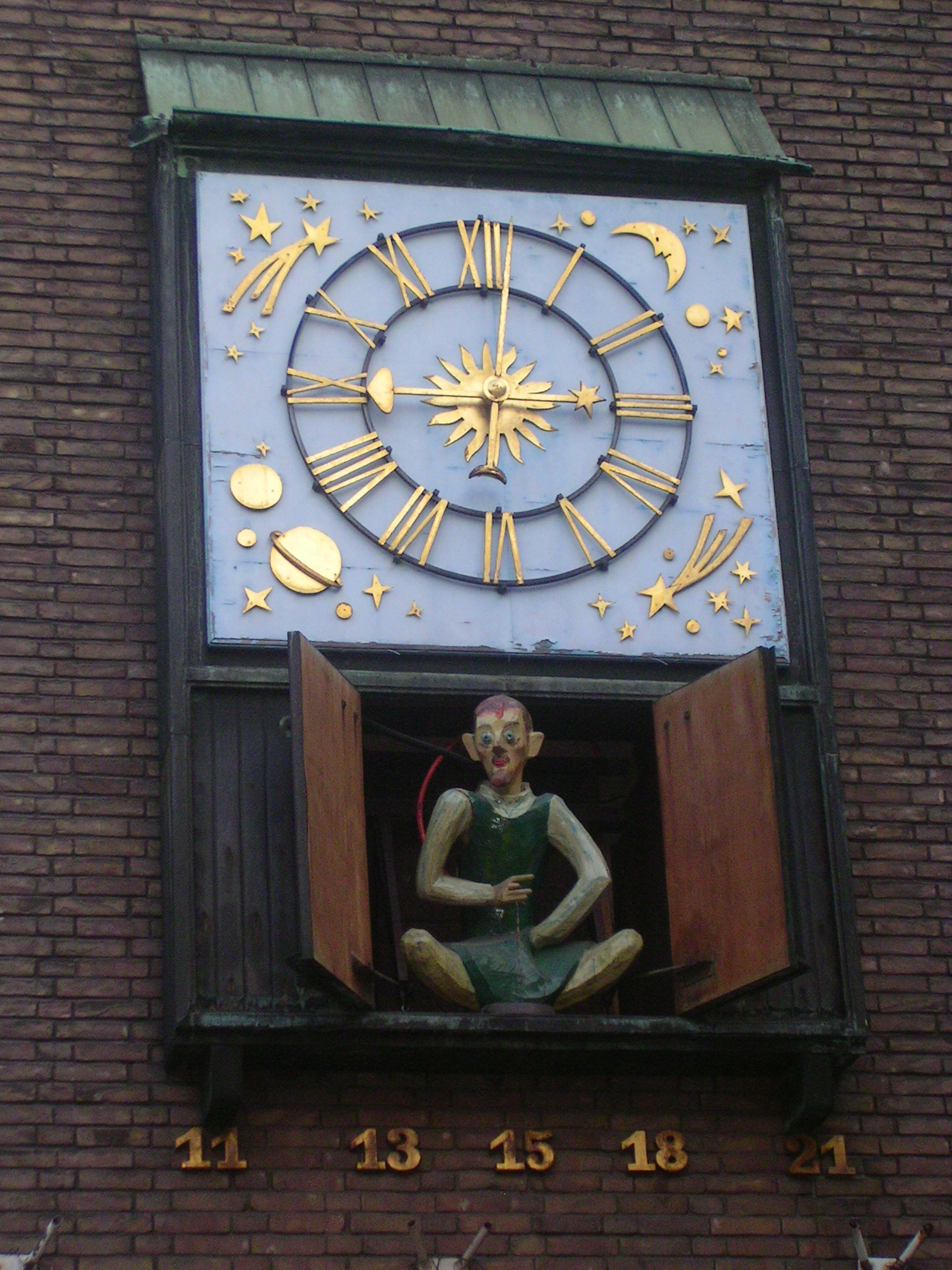
Müller-Schlösser's creation "Wibbel" became a popular icon in Düsseldorf.

Hans Müller-Schlösser (14 June 1884 – 21 March 1956) was a German poet and playwright closely associated with his native city of Düsseldorf. Müller-Schlösser is best known for his 1913 play Wibbel the Tailor, which inspired a 1938 opera by Mark Lothar and a number of film adaptations including Wibbel the Tailor (1931) directed by and starring Paul Henckels. He died in Düsseldorf, aged 71.

== Bibliography ==
- Grange, William (2008). Cultural Chronicle of the Weimar Republic. Scarecrow Press.
