= The Last Laugh (1924 film) =

1924 film directed by F. W. Murnau

- Directed by: F. W. Murnau
- Screenplay by: Carl Mayer
- Produced by: Erich Pommer
- Starring: Emil Jannings; Maly Delschaft; Max Hiller
- Cinematography: Karl Freund
- Music by: Giuseppe Becce
- Production company: UFA
- Distributed by: UFA
- Release date: 23 December 1924 (Germany)
- Running time: 90 minutes
- Country: Germany

The Last Laugh (German: Der letzte Mann, transl. The Last Man) is a 1924 German silent film directed by German director F. W. Murnau from a screenplay written by Carl Mayer. The film stars Emil Jannings and Maly Delschaft.

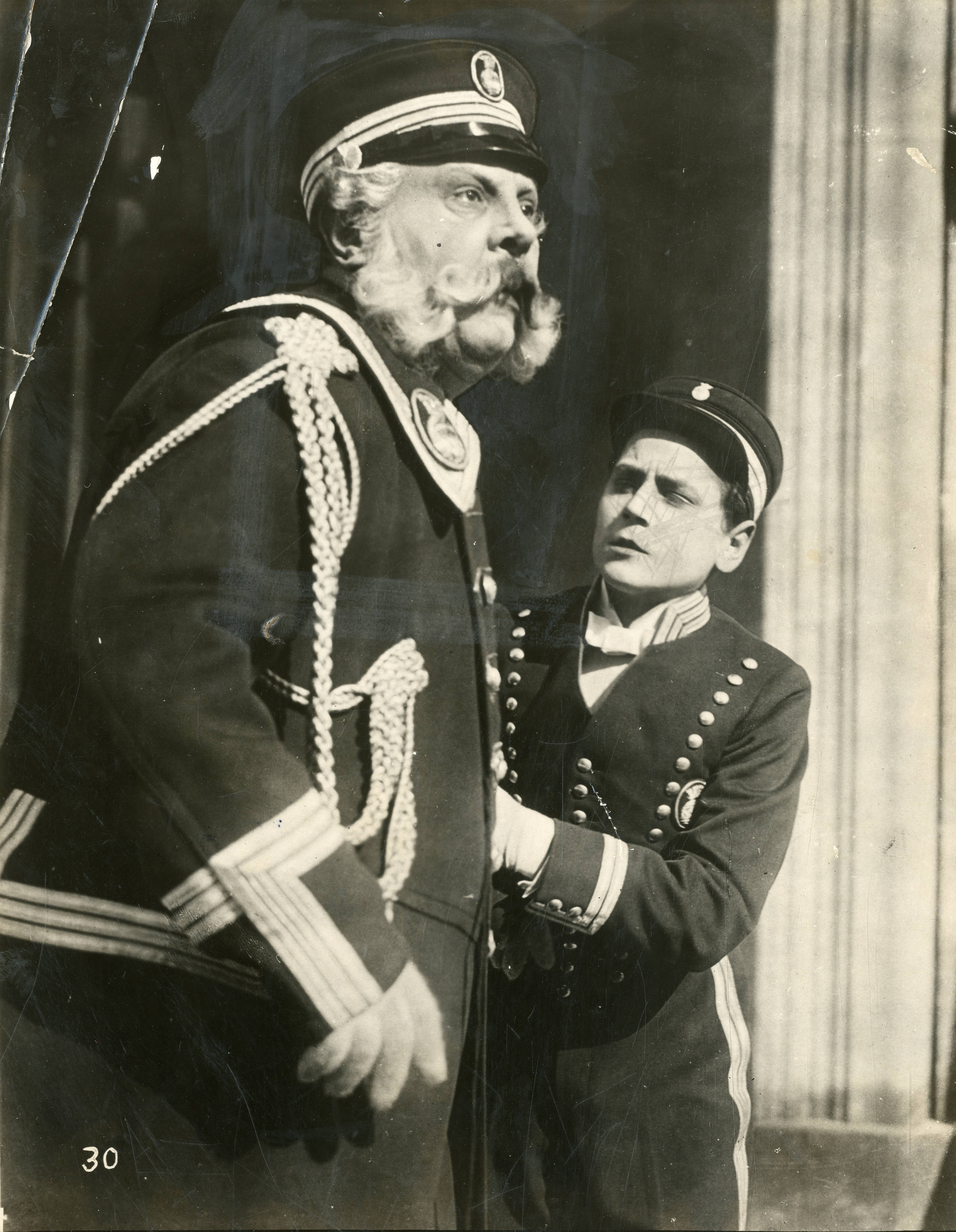
Emil Jannings as the Hotel Doorman

Stephen Brockmann summarized the film's plot as, "a nameless hotel doorman loses his job". It is a cinematic example of the Kammerspielfilm or "chamber-drama" genre, which follows the style of short, sparse plays of lower middle-class life that emphasized the psychology of the characters rather than the sets and action. The genre tried to avoid the intertitles (title cards) of spoken dialogue or description that characterize most silent films, in the belief that the visuals themselves should carry most of the meaning.

The film was voted number 11 on the prestigious Brussels 12 list at the 1958 World Expo, was featured in the 2022 Sight and Sound poll, and is considered one of the best films of all time. In 1955, the film was remade starring Hans Albers.

== Plot ==
Jannings' character is a doorman for a famous hotel, who takes great pride in his work and position. His uncaring manager decides that the doorman is getting too old and feeble to present the image of the hotel, and so demotes him to a less demanding job, of washroom attendant. He tries to conceal his demotion from his friends and family but, to his shame, he is discovered. His friends and neighbors, thinking he has lied to them all along about his prestigious job, taunt him mercilessly while his family rejects him out of shame. The doorman, shocked and in incredible grief, returns to the hotel to sleep in the washroom where he works. The only person to be kind towards him is the night watchman, who covers him with his coat as he falls asleep.

Following this comes the film's only title card, which says: "Here our story should really end, for in actual life, the forlorn old man would have little to look forward to but death. The author took pity on him, however, and provided quite an improbable epilogue."

At the end, the audience reads in the newspaper that the doorman inherited a fortune from an eccentric millionaire named A. G. Monen, a patron who died in his arms in the hotel washroom. The doorman returns to the hotel, where he happily dines lavishly with the night watchman who showed him kindness. On their way to his magnificent horse-drawn carriage, the doorman gives tips to all the service personnel from the hotel, who quickly line up along his way. In the final scene of the film, when both the doorman and the night watchman are in the carriage, a beggar asks the doorman for some money. The doorman invites the beggar to the carriage and even gives a tip to the new doorman, who is now in charge of bringing the guests inside.

== Cast ==
- Emil Jannings as hotel doorman
- Maly Delschaft as his daughter
- Max Hiller as her bridegroom
- Emilie Kurz as bridegroom's aunt
- Hans Unterkircher as hotel manager
- Olaf Storm as young guest
- Hermann Vallentin as guest with pot belly
- Georg John as night watchman
- Emmy Wyda as thin neighbor

== Production ==
Director F. W. Murnau was at the height of his film career in Germany and had high ambitions for his first film with UFA. He stated that "All our efforts must be directed towards abstracting everything that isn't the true domain of the cinema. Everything that is trivial and acquired from other sources, all the tricks, devices and cliches inherited from the stage and from books." Murnau called screenwriter Carl Mayer someone who worked in "the true domain of the cinema" and agreed to make Der letzte Mann after Mayer and film director Lupu Pick fought and Pick left the film. The film famously uses no intertitles, which had previously been done by Mayer and Pick on Scherben and Sylvester several years earlier, as well as by director Arthur Robison in the film Schatten in 1923.

The film was shot entirely at the UFA Studios. Murnau and cinematographer Karl Freund used elaborate camera movements for the film, a technique later called "entfesselte Kamera" (unchained camera). In one scene a camera was strapped to Freund's chest as he rode a bicycle into an elevator and onto the street below. In another scene a camera is sent down a wire from a window to the street below, and later reversed in editing. French filmmaker Marcel Carné later said that "The camera...glides, rises, zooms or weaves where the story takes it. It is no longer fixed, but takes part in the action and becomes a character in the drama." Years later Karl Freund dismissed Murnau's contributions to the films that they made together, claiming that Murnau had no interest in lighting and never looked through the camera, and that "Carl Mayer used to take much more interest than he did in framing." The film's set designers Robert Herlth and Walter Röhrig denied this statement and defended Murnau. Murnau described the film's cinematography as being "on account of the way... [objects] were placed or photographed, their image is a visual drama. In their relationship with other objects or with the characters, they are units in the symphony of the film."

Murnau noted that the story was absurd on the grounds that "everyone knows that a washroom attendant makes more than a doorman." The signs in the film are written in an imaginary language that Alfred Hitchcock took as Esperanto.

There were three different versions of the film, for German, American and international audiences. While European markets retained the meaning of the original German title (The Last Man) on its initial release, the English-speaking countries opted for the more optimistic Laugh title.

== Film and artistic technique ==
=== Camera movement ===
The use of camera movement, dramatic camera angles, distorted shots, and changing focus contributed to creating new perspectives and impressions for viewers. The film's use of montage was also pioneering: Murnau's technique was to use a smooth and rapid cutting in the initial scenes followed by jarred cutting in the scenes where the doorman becomes humiliated. A combination of distortion and overlapping of images is used in the scene where the doorman is drunk to portray his subjective experience. The camera work provides enhancements to Jannings's creative use of body language by using close ups and camera angles that encourage the viewer to see the events from the doorman's perspective. This type of camera movement is called affective movement. This term is used for camera movement that is based on the character's emotions, whereas camera movement that is based on the character's actions is referred to as action movement. In order for the viewer to be drawn further into the film, the camera must successfully correspond its movement to how the viewer would act in that specific scenario. In the scene where he is drunk, the unchained camera freely maneuvers and circles throughout the room, as if the viewer were drunk.

Another example of how the unchained camera technique brings the viewer into the film is the moment when the doorman learns that he has been replaced by a new, younger doorman. In this scene, with the help of a close-up and zoom-in of his face, the viewer now pays even closer attention to his facial expressions. This affective camera movement is effective for the viewer to identify and relate more with the character's inner emotional condition. By creating a connection between the viewer and the character with the unchained camera technique, the viewer becomes integrated into the film. This demonstrated the potential that camera movement brought to filmmaking. These aspects of the film come together to the term subjective movement, in which the viewer interprets camera movement subjectively, whereas they interpret the character's actions more objectively in action movement. The unchained camera captures the true essence of subjective movement and thus creates more possibilities in filmmaking.

=== Mise-en-scène ===
Decorations and presentation of contrasting environments were also significant in creating the impression. The contrast between the rich environment of the Atlantic hotel and the lower class housing, gives an impression of a realistic presentation of situations. The decorators for Der letzte Mann were Robert Herlth and Walter Röhrig. Another use of contrast was the illustration of the respect and essentially the power of the uniform combined with the ridicule and disregard which the doorman experienced after his demotion.

The power of the uniform in the German culture was analyzed in a scholarly article by Jon Hughes. Wearing of a uniform appears to enhance masculinity of the person and provides some institutional power, as the wearer identifies himself/herself with the corresponding institution. Therefore, a uniform provides personal confidence and the respect of others, as illustrated in Der letzte Mann. The quick ascension of the Nazis to power could also be attributed to their widespread use of uniforms. The film Der letzte Mann illustrates clearly this effect of self-confidence and personal/institutional power as connected to wearing of a decorated uniform.

=== Intertitles ===
The use of intertitles was common during the silent film era. The first academy awards in 1929 included an award for "Best Writing – Title Cards," as they were usually a key element of a film, and were thought to be necessary in conveying a film's narrative to audiences. Der letzte Mann was unusual in its use of only one title card throughout the film.

The film's lack of intertitles reflects Murnau's view that they were "an obstructive presence in film" that pointed to film's reliance on other art forms. In an interview with journalist Eduard Jawitz, Murnau stated that film was still a "young" art that did "not yet fully appreciate its own forms of expression and its material" which he explained was the reason that most films relied on intertitles to convey meaning. This perspective led Murnau to experiment with different visual strategies to communicate the film's narrative, like subjective camera movement and mise-en-scène.

The singular title card in Der letzte Mann (not including the shot of the letter indicating the doorman has been fired, which is the only other use of text in the film) is used to introduce the film's epilogue. The title card explains that while the narrative would realistically end with the doorman remaining in his hopeless situation, the film's writer "took pity on him" and created an "improbable" ending. This intertitle introduces a tonally different scene where the film jumps forward in time, showing the now wealthy doorman dining in the hotel. This ending has received criticism for its convenience, with some critics questioning whether the intertitle was an apologetic interjection from Murnau about this conclusion.

== Historical context ==
The film was made in 1924, at the time of the Weimar Republic. The war reparation payments imposed on Germany caused skyrocketing inflation, economic collapse, food shortages, poverty, malnutrition and hunger. Petit bourgeois Germans were looking for some hope for improvement of their economic situation. Even such an unrealistic possibility as inheriting money from somebody else brought some hope. This need for hope and the director's knowledge of the expectations of the general public were the reasons that Der letzte Mann had a happy, although unrealistic, epilogue.

German cinema began co-operative ventures with Hollywood producers, which led to mutual influence and in 1926 the German producers signed a contract with Hollywood, which started a migration of German actors and directors to Hollywood. The effect was similar to the later-observed brain drain of scientists from all over the world to the United States.

One of the results of this early cooperation was that director Alfred Hitchcock went to Berlin and started working with Friedrich Murnau. Hitchcock was very impressed with Murnau's unchained camera techniques and stated that his cooperation with Murnau was an "enormously productive experience" and that Der letzte Mann was an "almost perfect film". The cooperation with Murnau was for Hitchcock essentially a "key reference point". Hitchcock also expressed his appreciation for Murnau's camera-points-of-view and the subjective shots which provided "audience identification" with the main character. The rating of Der letzte Mann in Hollywood was very high: "Hollywood simply raved about The Last Laugh," noted Jan Horak.

== Reception and legacy ==
The film was a major critical and financial success and allowed Murnau to make two big budget films shortly afterwards. Critics praised the film's style and artistic camera movements. Film critic Paul Rotha said that it "definitely established the film as an independent medium of expression... Everything that had to be said... was said entirely through the camera...The Last Laugh was cine-fiction in its purest form; exemplary of the rhythmic composition proper to the film." Years later C. A. Lejeune called it "probably the least sensational and certainly the most important of Murnau's films. It gave the camera a new dominion, a new freedom... It influenced the future of motion picture photography... all over the world, and without suggesting any revolution in method, without storming critical opinion as Caligari had done, it turned technical attention towards experiment, and stimulated... a new kind of camera-thinking with a definite narrative end. Lotte Eisner praised its "opalescent surfaces streaming with reflections, rain, or light: car windows, the glazed leaves of the revolving door reflecting the silhouette of the doorman dressed in a gleaming black waterproof, the dark mass of houses with lighted windows, wet pavements and shimmering puddles... His camera captures the filtered half-light falling from the street lamps... it seizes railings through basement windows."

The film's story and content were also praised by critics, with Eisner stating that it "is pre-eminently a German tragedy, and can only be understood in a country where uniform is king, not to say god. A non-German mind will have difficulty in comprehending all its tragic implications." Siegfried Kracauer pointed out that "all the tenants, in particular the female ones... [revere the uniform] as a symbol of supreme authority and are happy to be allowed to revere it."

In 2000, Roger Ebert included it among his list of Great Movies. Based on 30 reviews, The Last Laugh has a 100% rating on Rotten Tomatoes, a film review aggregator, indicating universal support from critics. In a list of the 100 most important German films, compiled in 1994 by the Association of German Cinémathèques, The Last Laugh was placed at #20.

== Home media ==
Kino International released a reconstruction of the German version and an "unrestored export version" in 2008 (the latter apparently the version used by Kino in previous releases). A bonus 40-minute documentary compares the German, American and international versions.

== See also ==
- List of German films of 1919–1932
- List of films considered the best
