= Hintertreppe =

1921 film

- Directed by: Leopold Jessner and Paul Leni
- Written by: Carl Mayer
- Produced by: Hans Lippman and Henny Porten
- Cinematography: Willy Hameister and Karl Hasselmann
- Production company: Gloria-Film
- Distributed by: UFA
- Release date: 1921
- Running time: 50 minutes
- Country: Germany

Full-length film with English titles.

Hintertreppe (English: Backstairs) is a 1921 silent film. This was the first movie by German director Leopold Jessner, in cooperation with Paul Leni. Carl Mayer specifically wrote this for Leopold Jessner, who would go on to direct Erdgeist (1923). Hintertreppe was a precursor of the 1920s German kammerspielfilm style.

== Plot ==
The Maid (Henny Porten) wakes goes about her day doing her job. The Postman (Fritz Kortner)spies on her from his home down below in a basement across the street. The Postman delivers the mail up to The Maid's door which is up the backstairs of the building. The Maid opens up the letter and reads it.

At night she meets with The Lover (William Dieterle). The Postman sees this from his home. The Maid goes out the next night, still being watched by The Postman. The Lover doesn't come.

The next day The Postman delivers the mail. That night The Lover still doesn't come. She doesn't receive anymore letters from The Lover. The Maid grows upset by this. She eventually receives a letter detailing his love for her and the reason for his lack of letters. She shares this with The Postman and she embraces him in excitement.

During a party, that The Maid is working at, she writes a letter back. The Maid grabs some punch and two glasses. She goes down the backstairs and out towards The Postman's home. The Postman is writing a letter at this time. She comes into his home meaning with the drinks. The Postman tries to hide the letter but The Maid steals away from him in a playful gesture. It is a copy of the letter she received the previous day from The Lover. The Maid becomes greatly upset.

The Maid goes back to work and cleans up after the party. The Postman drops an envelope at her door. The Maid goes to the Postman carrying the letter. She rips the letter in half in front of him and begins to cry. She grabs the hand of the Postman and holds his arm. She cradles his head and kisses him.

The Postman cleans up his home and prepares dinner for him and The Maid. He hides and waits to surprise her. When she discovers him they hold hands. The Lover sees this interaction from outside. The Maid realizes this and goes to him. The Maid and The Lover argue. He gives her a letter. She embraces him. The Maid leaves. The Lover confronts The Postman. The Maid listens while a fight begins. The Maid tries to break in but can't. She calls for help. Others come and break the door down. It is revealed that The Postman has murdered The Lover with an ax.

Depressed, The Maid walks back to her quarters. She is fired from being a maid for neglecting her job. The maid climbs up the staircase and onto the roof. With everyone watching she jumps off and falls to her death.

== Cast ==
- Fritz Kortner as The Postman.
- Henny Porten as The Maid.
- William Dieterle as The Lover.

== Staff ==
- Produced by: Hanns Lippman and Henny Porten
- Original Music by: Hans Landsberger
- Cinematography: Willy Hameister and Karl Hasselmann
- Art Direction: Karl Gorge, Paul Leni, and Alfred Junge.
- Production Management: Wilhelm von Kaufmann

== Release ==
It was released in Germany on 11 December 1921.

The U.S. premiere of the film was in New York City on 3 June 1926.
