= The House Without Laughter =

1923 film

- German: Das Haus ohne Lachen
- Directed by: Gerhard Lamprecht
- Written by: Luise Heilborn-Körbitz; Gerhard Lamprecht
- Produced by: Lupu Pick
- Cinematography: Gotthardt Wolf
- Production company: Rex-Film
- Distributed by: UFA
- Release date: 5 April 1923
- Country: Germany
- Languages: Silent; German intertitles

The House Without Laughter (German: Das Haus ohne Lachen) is a 1923 German silent drama film directed by Gerhard Lamprecht.

The film's sets were designed by the art director Robert A. Dietrich.

== Cast ==
In alphabetical order

- Theodor Burghardt
- Rudolf Del Zopp as servant
- Henrik Galeen as William Blent
- Paul Gunther
- Egon Kleyersburg
- Adelheid Mannstedt
- Harry Nestor as Lester
- Maria Peterson as cook
- Edith Posca as Enid White
- Mathilde Sussin as William's wife
