= Grausige Nächte =

Grausige Nächte may refer to:

- Unheimliche Geschichten (1919 film), a German silent film also known as Grausige Nächte and Eerie Tales
- Nights of Terror (1921 film), a German silent film also known as Grausige Nächte

== See also ==
- Night of Terror (disambiguation)
- Nights of Terror (disambiguation)
