= Earth Spirit =

Earth Spirit may refer to:

- Earth Spirit (film), a 1923 film by Leopold Jessner
- Earth Spirit (play), a 1895 play by Frank Wedekind
- Erdgeist, a character in Faust, Part One, by Johann Wolfgang von Goethe
- Kaolin, the Earth Spirit, a character in the video game Dota 2

== See also ==
- Ekendriya
- List of earth deities
