= The Continental Players =

The Continental Players was a short-lived albeit well-chronicled Hollywood-based theater workshop and stock company founded in 1938 by Max Reinhardt and William Dieterle. It was supported by Hollywood film executives with the aim of boosting the careers of European thespians in America, notably exiled Jews from Germany and Austria.

== History ==
=== Die Reichskulturkammer of 1933 ===
In Germany, in 1933, by decree of Joseph Goebbels under a newly created agency called Die Reichskulturkammer (DKK), Jewish actors were, among other things, prohibited from performing on German stage.

=== Stock company objective ===
The main objective of The Continental Players was to help newly arrived European actors and actresses warm-up to American audiences and hone their performing skills in the English language. A sub-objective was to cultivate employment opportunities by producing showcase productions – somewhat akin to a baseball farm team – for newly arrived talent. William Dieterle, who conceived the idea, was president. The board included powerful industry luminaries Harry Warner, Charlotte Hagenbruch (wife of William Dieterle), A. Ronald Button, Leopold Jessner, and Walter Wanger, who, at the time, was President of the Academy of Motion Picture Arts and Sciences. Wanger financed the project. Only a few of the 60 initial members were Jewish exiles. Most members, nonetheless, faced challenges as actors and actresses in America. Of those who had already assimilated and established themselves, participation elevated the comradery and esprit de corps for the cause. The Continental Players had two notable sponsoring organizations: (i) the American Guild for German Cultural Freedom (de) – Thomas Mann, President, and (ii) the German-American League for Culture, Los Angeles (a nationwide anti-Hitler league; not to be confused with its nemesis, the German-American Bund).

The theater workshop, since June 1938, had been led by Max Reinhardt under the auspices of Max Reinhardt's Workshop of Stage, Screen, and Radio. Reinhardt provided the studios with well-trained bit actors. According to author Saverio Giovacchini in his 2001 book, Hollywood Modernism, the workshop well-represented an alliance between Hollywood New Yorkers and Europeans as much as it exemplified a close relationship between Hollywood and experimental cinema. Dieterle taught film directing; Henry Blanke – film production; Karl Freund and Rudolph Maté – experimental camerawork; John Huston – screenwriting; Edward G. Robinson and Paul Muni – acting; and Samson Raphaelson – dramaturgy.

=== Production ===
In May and June 1939, The Continental Players produced William Tell. Leopold Jessner directed it for the sixth and last time in his career. The play had been controversial on German stage, partly due to a 1919 production directed by Jessner at the Stadttheater Berlin, wherein, instead of mounting a traditional repertory version with conservative themes, Jessner decided on a complete German expressionistic recast – replete with discordant speech and scenic experimentation designed by Emil Pirchan (de). The set was cubistic with platforms, runways, and steps. Jessner's 1919 production angered right-wing conservatives and fascists.

The 1939 production failed, financially, due partly to actors struggling in English and partly to the version being non-traditional. The loss, about $30,000, was an impetus for shuttering the erstwhile popular production venue, The Players Dinner Theater. Yet, the effort was chronicled favorably as altruistic.

Dates	Play	Writer(s)	Director	Theater
May 25 – June 12, 1939	William Tell	Adaptation of Friedrich Schiller's 1804 original (two acts and ten scenes)	Leopold Jessner	El Capitan Theatre; Hollywood; The Continental Players
	Cast: Louis Adlon; Siegfried Arno (Stuessi); Lutz Altschul (Rösselmann); Norbert J. Kobler (1916–2003), son of German actor and director, Julius Kobler (de); Ernst Lenart (de); Sigmund Nunberg (de); Friedrich Mellinger; Ernst Deutsch (the dictator); Leo Reuss (aka Lionel Royce) (William Tell); Norbert Schiller (de), great-great-great nephew of the playwright (Baumgarten); Gerhard Schaefer (Arnold von Melchtal); Hans Schumm; Walter O. Stahl (de); Rudolf Steinbock (de); Christiane Grautoff (de) (Ernst Toller's wife) (Hedwig, Tell's wife); Eva Hyde (aka Heyde; née Heymann; 1910–1955) (Note: Eva Hyde (née Eva Heymann; 1910–1953), a Munich-born actress who was exiled in 1937, was the third wife of composer Werner R. Heymann, her first husband whom she divorced in 1940. She was a distant cousin of Werner Heymann. In 1952, she married artist Klaus Brill (1913–2007).) (Armgard); Hermine Sterler (Gertrude Stauffacher); Alexander Granach (Stauffacher); Bobby Moya (young Tell).			
	Leopold Jessner, director; Ralph Freed, text; Rudi Feld, art director (costumes and set design); Ernst Toch, music score; Ingolf Dahl, conductor;Simon Mitchneck, Phd (1893–1986), English and voice coach (linguist).			

== Experimental theater companies in Los Angeles in the latter 1930s ==
- Contemporary Theater, founded 1934 by a coalition of Europeans and New Yorkers
- Modern Theater, founded by Edward Gering (brother of Marion Gering), with the help of Fritz Lang, Francis Lederer, Frank Capra, and Salka Viertel
- Hollywood Theater Alliance, founded 1939; Gertrude Ross Marks (de) was managing director

== Bibliography ==
=== References ===
- Giovacchini, Saverio [at Wikidata] (2001). Hollywood Modernism: Film and Politics in the Age of the New Deal. Temple University Press. LCCN 00-53215; ISBN 978-1-5663-9862-6, 1-5663-9862-2, ISBN 978-1-5663-9863-3, 1-5663-9863-0; OCLC 45320479 (all editions).
1. Via Google Books (limited preview). Retrieved December 26, 2025.
  1. Continental Players.
  2. Contemporary Theater.
  3. Modern Theater.
  4. Hollywood Theater Alliance.
2. Via Internet Archive. Retrieved December 26, 2025.
  1. Continental Players. p. 110.
- Heilmann, Matthias (2005) [2011]. Leopold Jessner – Intendant der Republik: Der Weg eines deutsch-jüdischen Regisseurs aus Ostpreußen [Leopold Jessner—Intendant of the Republic: The Path of a German-Jewish Director from East Prussia]. Max Niemeyer Verlag (de). p. 429. ISSN 0934-6252 (series); ISBN 3-4846-6047-3; OCLC 979970340 (all editions).
1. Via Google Books (limited preview).
- Los Angeles Times (The). LCCN sn89-80087 LCCN sn81-4356 (23 October 1886 – current), ISSN 0458-3035 (print), ISSN 2165-1736 (online); OCLC 3638237 (all editions).
1. "Refugees to Act Here – Stage Stars Forced to Leave Nazi Areas Aided by Film Men". Vol. 58, no. 149. May 1, 1939. p. 3 (part 2).
  1. Via Newspapers.com (digital image 23).
- Spalek, John M. (1928–2021) [in German]; Strelka, Joseph Peter (1927–2022) [in German], eds. (2018). Deutsche Exilliteratur seit 1933 [German Exile Literature Since 1933] (Vol 1: "Kalifornien" ["California"]; Part 1 of 2). (4 Volumes in 12 Parts) (in German). Bern and Munich: A. Francke Verlag. LCCN 77-455937; ISBN 978-3-7720-1158-0, 3-7720-1158-6 (Vol. 1, Part 1), ISBN 978-3-1109-6971-9, 3-1109-6971-8 (Vol. 1, Part 1), ISBN 978-3-7720-1142-9, 3-7720-1142-X (Vol. 1, Part 1); OCLC 2815691 (all editions), OCLC 476880971 (all editions).
1. Mierendorff, Marta (1911–2002). Entry: "Leopold Jessner". pp. 738–747. doi:10.1515/9783110969719-045 (article); OCLC 7318834256 (article).
  1. Via Internet Archive (Trent University; Kahle/Austin Foundation).
  2. Via Google Books (limited preview). (2018 reprint).
  3. Via Google Books (snippet view).
From the Marta Mierendorff Papers; 1933–1985 at the Online Archive of California Collection no. 0214, Box 39, Feuchtwanger Memorial Library, Special Collections (Doheny Library), University of Southern California Libraries. OCLC 709903745 (all editions)
- Vincendeau, Ginette (born 1948), ed. (1995). Encyclopedia of European Cinema. New York: Facts on File. LCCN 95-34717; ISBN 978-0-8160-3394-2, 0-8160-3394-3 (hardcover), ISBN 978-0-8160-3395-9, 0-8160-3395-1 (paperback).
1. Wedel, Michael (born 1969). "Dieterle, Wilhelm" (includes bibliography). p. 113 – via Internet Archive.
