= New Year's Eve (1924 film) =

1924 film

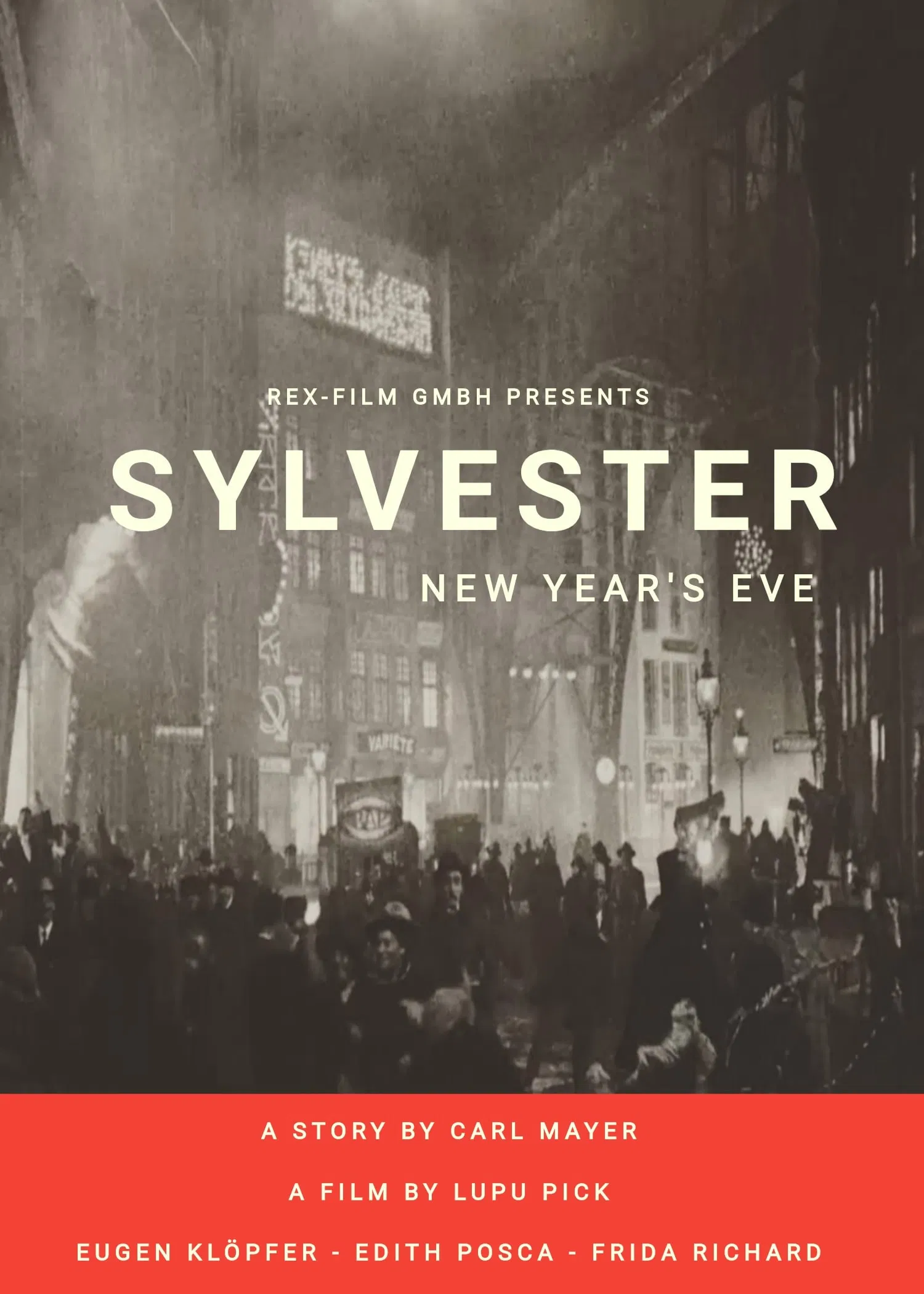
- Directed by: Lupu Pick
- Written by: Carl Mayer
- Produced by: Lupu Pick
- Starring: Eugen Klöpfer; Edith Posca
- Cinematography: Karl Hasselmann; Guido Seeber
- Edited by: Luise Heilborn-Körbitz
- Music by: Klaus Pringsheim Sr.
- Production company: Rex-Film GmbH
- Distributed by: Universum Film AG
- Release date: 3 January 1924
- Running time: 66 and 74 minutes
- Country: Germany / German Reich
- Language: Silent film

New Year's Eve (German: Sylvester: Tragödie einer Nacht) is a 1924 German silent Kammerspielfilm directed by Lupu Pick and written by Carl Mayer. It was filmed in 1923 and premiered in Berlin on 4 January 1924. The film is known to be one of the earliest examples of a kammerspielfilm and was innovative in its extensive use of "entfesselte Kamera", using tracking and gliding techniques as opposed to keeping the camera stationary. Like Pick's previous films, New Year's Eve does not use intertitles.

== Plot ==
A man is celebrating New Year's Eve with his wife and his mother, who are at odds with one another. As the evening progresses, the rivalry between the two women increases to an open hatred that eventually escalates into a big fight. The man assumes no position in favor of either woman and instead chooses to flee from the conflict.

== Cast ==
- Eugen Klöpfer as Der Mann
- Edith Posca as Die Frau
- Frida Richard as Die Mutter
- Karl Harbacher
- Julius E. Herrmann
- Rudolf Blümner
