= Erdgeist =

Erdgeist may refer to:

- The spirit of the Earth in Faust, Part One
- Earth Spirit (play), an 1895 play by Frank Wedekind
  - Earth Spirit (film), a 1923 German film
