= Lionel Royce =

Austrian-American actor (1891–1946)

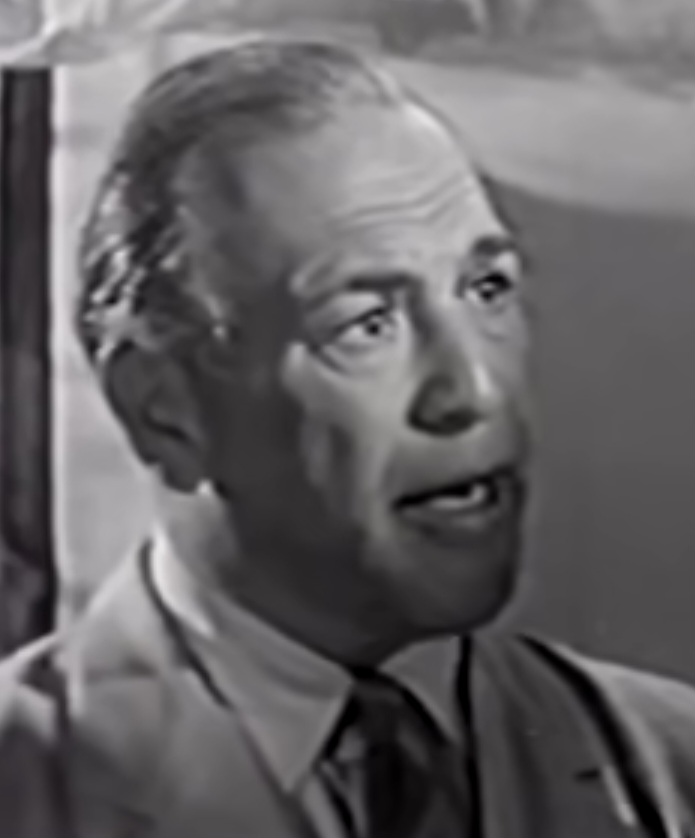
- Royce in White Pongo (1945)
- Born: Leon Moriz Reiss; March 30, 1891; Dolyna, Galicia, Austria-Hungary (now Dolyna, Ukraine)
- Died: April 1, 1946 (aged 55); Manila, Philippines
- Other name: Leo Reuss
- Occupation: Actor
- Years active: 1919–1946
- Spouse: Stephanie Wagner (m. 1916; div. 1925) Agnes Straub (m. 1925; died 1941)
- Children: 2
- Military service
- Allegiance: Austria-Hungary
- Branch: Austro-Hungarian Army
- Service years: 1914–1918
- Rank: Lieutenant
- Unit: Infanterie-Regiment Hoch- und Deutschmeister Nr. 4.
- Awards: Medal of Valor

Lionel Royce (born Leon Moriz Reiss; March 30, 1891 – April 1, 1946) was an Austrian-American actor of stage and screen, also known during his European career as Leo Reuss. He began his career in theater in Vienna, Austria, in 1919, before moving to Berlin in 1925. Being Jewish, his work began to be restricted in the 1930s in Nazi Germany. Fleeing the Nazis he returned to Austria in 1936, where to hide his heritage, he created the persona of Kaspar Brandhofer, a Tyrolian peasant, and became a sensation as a natural actor on the stage in Vienna. When he admitted his ruse, he became blacklisted in Austria, after which he emigrated to the United States in 1937. He had an active film career in the United States, appearing in almost 40 films between 1938 and 1946. While on tour with the USO, he died in Manila in 1946.

== Early life ==
He was born in the city of Dolyna, in what is now Ukraine, to Jewish parents. In 1913 he entered the Academy of Music and Performing Arts in Vienna. At the outbreak of World War I, he volunteered for the Austro-Hungarian Army and served in the Infanterie-Regiment Hoch- und Deutschmeister Nr. 4. In 1916 he married his first wife, Stephanie Wagner, with whom he had two children, Margaret Ilse Royce (née Reiss; 1917–1995) and Hans "John Henry" Royce (né Reiss; 1920–1997). He entered the war as a private in 1914, and rose to the rank of lieutenant by the war's end. Wounded several times, he received a medal for valor.

== Career ==
=== Early stage career ===
He adopted the stage name of Leo Reuss. His first stage appearance was as the Duke of Albany in a production of King Lear at the Vienna Komödienhaus, on May 30, 1919. This was under the tutelage of the famous Austrian actor/director Rudolph Schildkraut. Following this, he went to Munich in 1921, where he joined the Kammerspiele. This propelled him to travel to Berlin, where he joined the Berliner Staatstheater (Berlin State Theater), with Leopold Jessner as director. It was here that he gained fame as a stage actor. During his time in Berlin he also worked under Erwin Piscator and Bertolt Brecht. By 1925 he was divorced, and living with actress Agnes Straub. The two left the Berlin State Theater, and joined the Berliner Volksbühne. The two formed the Schauspielerin Agnes Straub (Agnes Straub Touring Company). However, as the Nazi regime gained more and more power in Germany, it became increasingly difficult for Reuss to work, due to his being Jewish. The implementation of the Nuremberg Laws in 1935 were the final straw, and Reuss returned to his native Austria. However, in Austria he also found it difficult to obtain work due to his Jewish heritage.

=== Subterfuge ===
In order to get work as an actor, Reuss began an elaborate subterfuge. He retreated to a cabin he owned up in the mountains. There he lived and studied the mannerisms of the local Tyrolian farmers, while letting his hair and beard grow. He practiced at adapting their ways of speech and movement. After a year, he showed up in the created persona of Kaspar Brandhofer, a Tyrolian peasant, having grown a full beard. To further hide his identity, he bleached all of his hair, head and body, by bathing every ten days in diluted hydrogen peroxide. He also had obtained papers from one of the peasants he had been observing in the mountains. Armed with this new Christian identity, he began presenting himself as a naturally taught actor. Having worked with director Max Reinhardt years before, Reuss was fearful that the director would recognize him, but Reinhardt did not. In fact, his ability so impressed the director, that Reinhardt recommended him to Ernst Lothar, in Vienna.

Lothar gave him a featured role in the stage adaptation of Arthur Schnitzler's novella, Fräulein Else. Many of the actors in the play had worked with Reuss over the years, so once again he knew that he could not drop the character of Brandhofer for a second. The play debuted on December 2, 1936, at the Theater in der Josefstadt. His performance was hailed as a great success, and Brandhofer was touted as a potential star, with one paper calling him "the sensation of the evening." Other accolades came in naming him "the humble peasant of the Austrian Alps, the finest natural actor of his generation," while the Nazis lauded him for his "Aryan" roles. Lothar gave him a three-year contract. However, after the reviews were in, he announced his true identity. Rather than being pleased with the reviews, he felt "emptiness and loneliness", and that he felt the necessity of his assuming the Brandhofer persona was an indication that the Nazi regime's power was growing to an untenable level. The resulting uproar of his fraud caused him once again to have to relocate, this time to the United States, where he had been given a contract by MGM, after Louis B. Mayer had seen his performance in Vienna.

=== The United States ===
Forced to flee Austria in 1937, Reuss changed his name again, this time to Lionel Royce, and emigrated to the United States. He began his American film career in 1938, with a small role in the epic, Marie Antoinette, starring Tyrone Power and Norma Shearer. He enjoyed a productive film career for the next 8 years. He began 1939 with a few small roles in films such as a German in Let Freedom Ring, and then was cast in the important role of Mr. Bachspiegel in Broadway Serenade. After this he was cast as Hintze, one of the Nazi spies, in Confessions of a Nazi Spy. In 1939, his work as General Von Ehrhardt in Nurse Edith Cavell was praised for his stand-out performance. At the close of the year, he appeared on-screen with the Ritz Brothers in Pack Up Your Troubles. In this film Royce would work with Joseph Schildkraut, the son of his one-time mentor, Rudolph Schildkraut. Outside of film, in 1939 Royce joined The Continental Players, a theater group made up of refugees from the Nazi regime in Europe. The brainchild of William Dieterle, it was funded by him and Harry Warner, with the famed German director Leopold Jessner taking the directing helm. After attaining some notability in the United States, Royce was approached by the German embassy in Washington. They had been instructed by their leaders in Berlin to offer Royce "honorary Aryan" status, if he would return to Germany and take over control of UFA. Royce refused.

Royce opened 1940 as Dr. Rudolph Grosser, one of the suspects in the detective picture, Charlie Chan in Panama. His performance as Max Sturm in the 1940 drama, Four Sons was called "superb" by some media. His role as the German interrogator Herr Deckart in the wartime drama, The Man I Married, starring Joan Bennett and Francis Lederer, received positive reviews. Also in 1940, Royce was one of three henchman who try to subvert the mission of Fredric March in Victory. He closed out the year in the featured role of Colonel Zimmerman in the action film, The Son of Monte Cristo, starring Louis Hayward, Joan Bennett, and George Sanders.

His final film appearance was in the classic film noir, Gilda (1946), starring Rita Hayworth and Glenn Ford.

== Death and legacy ==
In 1946, he joined a USO tour, going to entertain the troops in the Pacific Theater. While the tour was in Manila, Royce died suddenly of a heart attack, on April 1, after being taken to Subic Bay Naval Hospital.

The irony of Royce's film career is that he ended up portraying the very people he had fled from in Germany and Austria. In the 1990s, a play about Royce's life was written by Felix Mitterer, titled In der Löwengrube (English: In the Lion's Den). It premiered at the Volkstheater in Vienna on January 24, 1998. In 2005, a German-language biography of Lionel Royce was published under the title Die Ratten betreten das sinkende Schiff. Das absurde Leben des Leo Reuss (The Rats Enter the Sinking Ship: The Absurd Life of Leo Reuss), written by Gwendolyn von Ambesser (1949–2025) and published by Edition AV.

== Filmography ==
- I.N.R.I. (1923) as Bartholomew
- Chasing Fortune (1930, Short)
- Flachsmann the Educator (1930) as Karsten Diercks
- 1914 (1931) as Maklakov
- Marie Antoinette (1938) as Guillaume (uncredited)
- Let Freedom Ring (1939) as German (uncredited)
- Broadway Serenade (1939) as Mr. Bachspiegel (uncredited)
- Confessions of a Nazi Spy (1939) as Hintze
- 6,000 Enemies (1939) as 'Dutch' Myers
- Conspiracy (1939) as Second Lieutenant
- Nurse Edith Cavell (1939) as General Von Ehrhardt
- Espionage Agent (1939) as Hoffmeyer (uncredited)
- Pack Up Your Troubles (1939) as Gen. von Boech
- Charlie Chan in Panama (1940)
- The Man I Married (1940)
- Four Sons (1940)
- Road to Zanzibar (1941)
- South of Panama (1941)
- So Ends Our Night (1941)
- Underground (1941)
- The Son of Monte Cristo (1941)
- Victory (1941)
- Halfway to Shanghai (1942)
- Once Upon a Honeymoon (1942)
- Berlin Correspondent (1942)
- The Lady Has Plans (1942)
- My Favorite Blonde (1942)
- My Favorite Spy (1942)
- Unseen Enemy (1942) (as Lyonel Royce)
- Crash Dive (1943)
- Hitler's Madman (1943)
- Let's Face It (1943)
- Mission to Moscow (1943)
- Bomber's Moon (1943)
- Assignment in Brittany (1943)
- Above Suspicion (1943)
- The Cross of Lorraine (1944)
- The Hitler Gang (1944)
- Passport to Destiny (1944)
- The Seventh Cross (1944)
- White Pongo (1945)
- Gilda (1946) as German (uncredited)
