= Mierendorff =

Mierendorff is a surname. Notable people with the name include:

- Carlo Mierendorff (1897-1943), German politician
- Hans Mierendorff (1882-1955), German stage and film actor
- Marta Mierendorff (1911-2002), German typist, art sociologist, and researcher
