= Marionettes of Desire =

- Directed by: Lupu Pick
- Written by: Lupu Pick; Fanny Carlsen; Gerhard Lamprecht
- Produced by: Lupu Pick
- Starring: Bernd Aldor
- Cinematography: Ivar Petersen
- Production company: Rex-Film
- Distributed by: Rex-Film
- Release date: 1919
- Country: Germany
- Languages: Silent; German intertitles

Marionettes of Desire (German:Marionetten der Leidenschaft) is a 1919 German silent film directed by Lupu Pick and starring Bernd Aldor, Paul Biensfeldt and Edith Posca.

== Bibliography ==
- Jill Nelmes & Jule Selbo. Women Screenwriters: An International Guide. Palgrave Macmillan, 2015.
