= Night of Terror (disambiguation) =

Night of Terror is a 1933 horror film.

Night of Terror or A Night of Terror may also refer to:

== Film and television ==
- A Night of Terror (1911 film), an American silent film directed by Edwin S. Porter
- Love from a Stranger (1937 film), also known as A Night of Terror, a British film directed by Rowland V. Lee
- Night of Terror (1972 film), an American television film directed by Jeannot Szwarc
- Night of Terror (2006 film), a television film directed by William Tannen

== Other uses ==
- Night of Terror, an incident on November 14, 1917, at the Occoquan Workhouse in Virginia, in which suffragist prisoners were beaten and abused
- Murray-Hill riot, also known as Montreal's night of terror, a 1969 unrest in Montreal, Quebec, during a Montreal police strike
- "Night of Terror", an instrumental by Clint Mansell from the Black Swan soundtrack (2010)

== See also ==
- Grausige Nächte (disambiguation)
- Night Terror (disambiguation)
- A Night of Total Terror, a 1996 film directed by James Rolfe
- Rats: Night of Terror, a 1984 horror film
- Terror by Night, a 1946 Sherlock Holmes film
