= Pack Up Your Troubles (1939 film) =

- Theatrical release poster
- Directed by: H. Bruce Humberstone
- Screenplay by: Lou Breslow; Owen Francis
- Produced by: Sol M. Wurtzel
- Starring: Jane Withers; The Ritz Brothers; Lynn Bari; Joseph Schildkraut; Stanley Fields; Fritz Leiber; Lionel Royce
- Cinematography: Lucien N. Andriot
- Edited by: Nick DeMaggio
- Music by: Samuel Kaylin
- Production company: 20th Century-Fox
- Distributed by: 20th Century-Fox
- Release date: October 20, 1939
- Running time: 75 minutes
- Country: United States
- Language: English

Pack Up Your Troubles is a 1939 American comedy film directed by H. Bruce Humberstone and written by Lou Breslow and Owen Francis. The film stars Jane Withers, The Ritz Brothers, Lynn Bari, Joseph Schildkraut, Stanley Fields, Fritz Leiber and Lionel Royce. The film was released on October 20, 1939, by 20th Century-Fox.

== Plot ==
The Ritz Brothers join the army in the times of the First World War, they get sent to France with their unit and meet Colette, an orphan of an American mother and a French father. The sweet and courageous girl then proceeds to help the Allies.

== Cast ==
- Jane Withers as Colette
- The Ritz Brothers as The Ritz Brothers
- Lynn Bari as Yvonne
- Joseph Schildkraut as Hugo Ludwig
- Stanley Fields as Sgt. Walker
- Fritz Leiber as Pierre Ferrand
- Lionel Royce as Gen. von Boech
- Georges Renavent as Col. Giraud
- Adrienne D'Ambricourt as Mme. Marchand
- Leon Ames as Adjutant
- Wilhelm von Brincken as Mueller
- Edward Gargan as Sentry
- Robert Emmett Keane as Kane
- Henry Victor as Col. Schlager
