= City in View =

1923 film

- Directed by: Henrik Galeen
- Written by: Friedrich Sieburg; Henrik Galeen
- Produced by: Lupu Pick
- Starring: Harry Nestor; Edith Posca; Friedrich Traeger; Otto Treptow
- Cinematography: Gotthardt Wolf
- Production company: Rex-Film
- Distributed by: UFA
- Release date: 8 February 1923
- Running time: 60 minutes
- Country: Germany
- Languages: Silent; German intertitles

City in View (German: Stadt in Sicht) is a 1923 German silent drama film directed by Henrik Galeen and starring Harry Nestor, Edith Posca and Friedrich Traeger. It premiered in Berlin on 8 February 1923.

== Cast ==
- Harry Nestor as Fritz
- Edith Posca
- Friedrich Traeger as Ullrich
- Otto Treptow

== Bibliography ==
- Grange, William (2008). Cultural Chronicle of the Weimar Republic. Scarecrow Press. ISBN 978-0-8108-5967-8.
