= Carl Mayer =

Austrian screenwriter

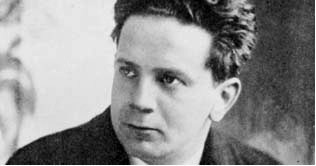
- Carl Mayer (c. 1920s)
- Born: 20 November 1894; Graz, Styria, Austria-Hungary
- Died: 1 July 1944 (aged 49); London, England
- Resting place: Highgate Cemetery, London
- Occupation: Screenwriter
- Years active: 1919–1940
- Notable work: The Cabinet of Doctor Caligari (1920); The Last Laugh (1924); Sunrise (1927)

Carl Mayer (20 November 1894 – 1 July 1944) was an Austrian screenwriter. Mayer wrote or co-wrote the screenplays to The Cabinet of Dr. Caligari (1920), The Haunted Castle (1921), Der Letzte Mann (1924), Tartuffe (1926), Sunrise: A Song of Two Humans (1927), and 4 Devils (1928), most of them being films directed by F. W. Murnau. Mayer was a fundamental figure in the dramatic and narrative establishment of both German expressionist cinema and Kammerspielfilm.

== Early life and career ==
Born into a Jewish family, Mayer was the son of a stock speculator who committed suicide, forcing the young Carl to leave school at 15, and go to work as a secretary. Mayer moved from native Graz to Innsbruck and then Vienna, where he worked as a dramatist. The events of World War I turned him into a pacifist.

In 1917, Mayer went to Berlin, where he worked at the small Residenztheater. He befriended Gilda Langer, a leading actress of the theater and fell in love with her. He wrote the script for Dr. Caligari (1920) with Hans Janowitz, and planned to have Langer star in the film. However, Langer became engaged to director Paul Czinner, then Langer died unexpectedly early in 1920. (The role went to actress Lil Dagover instead.) Mayer paid for Langer's tombstone and had notes from Wagner's Tristan und Isolde engraved on it.

Kabinett led to Mayer working with many leading directors in Germany. He worked with F. W. Murnau on Der Letzte Mann (1924, known as The Last Laugh in the English-speaking world) in Germany, and he also wrote the scenario for Murnau's Sunrise (1927), made during Murnau's stay in Hollywood. Mayer also co-wrote Berlin: Symphony of a Metropolis (1927) with Karl Freund and Walter Ruttmann.

Being Jewish as well as a pacifist, Mayer thought it best to leave Germany when the Nazis came to power. In 1933, shortly after working with Béla Balázs on the script for Das Blaue Licht (1932), directed by Leni Riefenstahl, he moved to London to escape the Nazi regime. In London, he worked as an adviser to the British film industry, and became friends with British film figures such as director and film writer Paul Rotha.

== Death ==
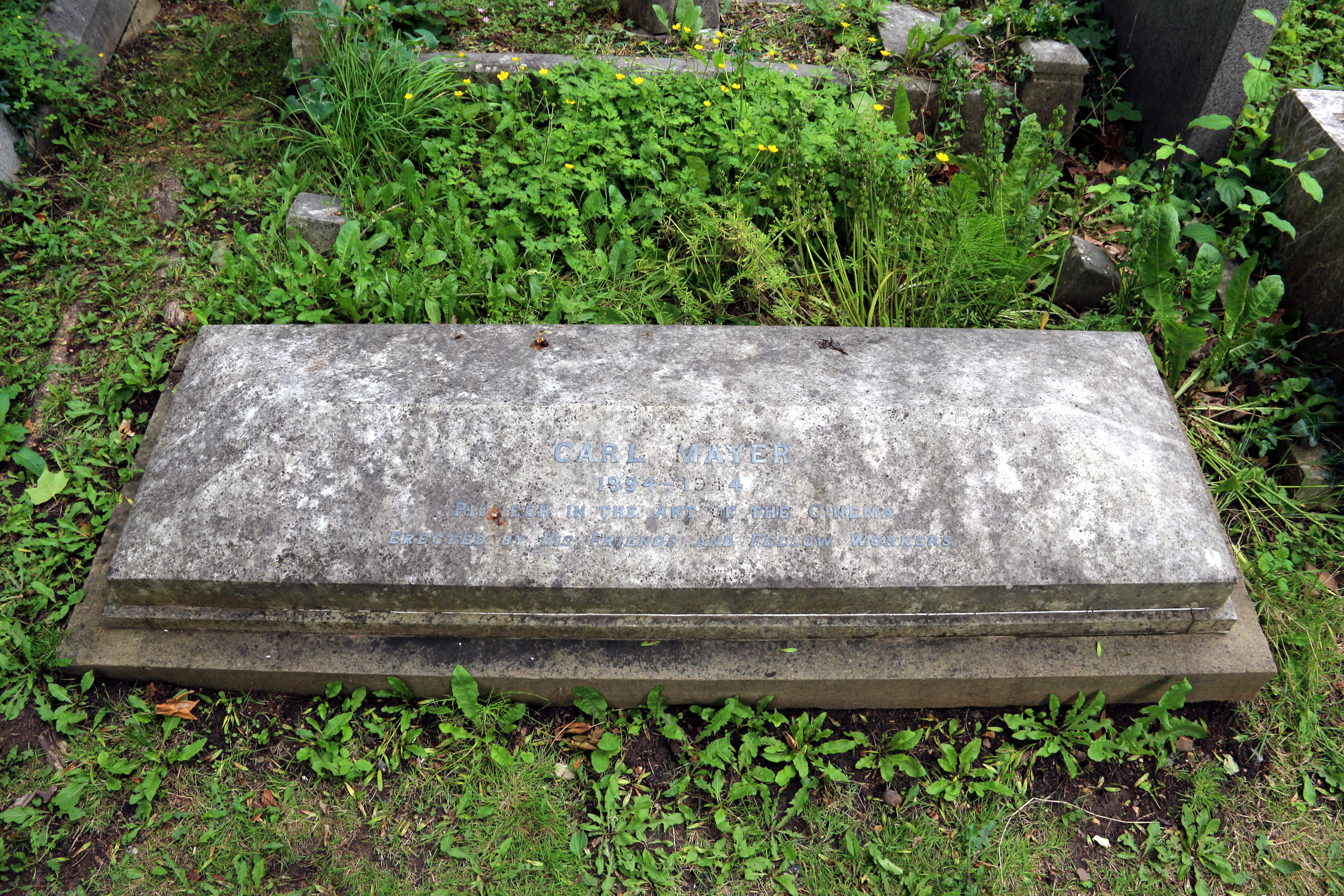
The grave of Carl Mayer, Highgate Cemetery East

In 1942, Mayer was diagnosed with cancer. Near the end of his life, he wanted to make a documentary film on London, but due to anti-German sentiment and difficult economic conditions, he was unable to find a producer.

His illness was treated somewhat ineptly due to war conditions and he died at the age of 49 on 1 July 1944, poor and almost forgotten. He was buried in the eastern section of Highgate Cemetery, south of the entrance, facing the grave of William Friese-Greene, in London. His epitaph reads "Pioneer in the art of the cinema. Erected by his friends and fellow workers". The city of Graz has named a prize after him.

== Selected filmography ==
- The Cabinet of Doctor Caligari (1920)
- Scherben (1921)
- Nights of Terror (1921)
- Hintertreppe (1921)
- Danton (1921)
- The Doll Maker of Kiang-Ning (1923)
- Earth Spirit (1923)
- New Year's Eve (1924)
- The Last Laugh (1924)
- Sunrise (1927)
- Fräulein Else (1929)
- The Man Who Murdered (1931)
- Ariane (1931)
- Dreaming Lips (1932)
- Dreaming Lips (1937)
- Dreaming Lips (1953)
