= Edith Posca =

German actor

- Born: 4 November 1892; German Empire
- Died: 28 June 1931 (aged 38); Berlin, Germany
- Occupation: Actress
- Years active: 1917–1924 (film)

Edith Posca (1892–1931) was a German stage and film actress. The wife of director Lupu Pick, she appeared as the leading lady in a number of his silent era productions.

== Selected filmography ==
- City in View (1920)
- Marionettes of Desire (1920)
- The Forbidden Way (1920)
- Nobody Knows (1920)
- Nights of Terror (1921)
- Shattered (1921)
- To the Ladies' Paradise (1922)
- The House Without Laughter (1923)
- New Year's Eve (1924)

== Bibliography ==
- Jennifer M. Kapczynski & Michael D. Richardson. A New History of German Cinema. Boydell & Brewer, 2014.
