= Henrik Galeen =

Austrian-born actor and screenwriter

- Galeen in 1942
- Born: Heinrich Wiesenberg; 7 January 1881; Lemberg, Kingdom of Galicia and Lodomeria, Austria-Hungary
- Died: 30 July 1949 (aged 68); Randolph, Vermont, United States
- Occupations: Actor, screenwriter, film director
- Years active: 1913–1935 (film)

Henrik Galeen (7 January 1881 – 30 July 1949) was an Austrian-born actor, screenwriter and film director considered an influential figure in the development of German Expressionist cinema during the silent era. He wrote the screenplay for Nosferatu (1922).

== Early years ==
Galeen was born in Lemberg, Galicia, which was then part of the Austrian Empire, to Adolph Galeen and Maria Adler, in a Jewish family. He moved from Austria to Germany before the First World War, and became assistant to the leading theatre figure Max Reinhardt. Galeen subsequently became an actor in Berlin and touring other German-speaking cities. He served as an officer in the German army in World War I.

== German silent films ==
Galeen first became involved in film in 1913 when he worked on the screenplays for several uncredited films. In 1914, he wrote, directed and acted in The Golem (1915), the first of several depictions of the mythical figure The Golem. Following the First World War, he went to work for a branch of the major German studio UFA. He worked as a screenwriter on films such as Ruth's Two Husbands (1919) and Waxworks (1924).

In 1922, he was engaged to write a version of Dracula, however producers had not obtained the rights to the novel from the copyright holder. Names of characters and the locations of the story were changed and the script was retitled Nosferatu (1922). The film has come to be regarded as a classic of German expressionist cinema. Along with two of his later films, The Student of Prague (1926) and Alraune (1928), Nosferatu serves as the basis for Galeen's reputation. He also worked on a number of less-remembered films, including a series of thrillers starring Harry Piel.

== Later career ==
From 1928 to 1931, he lived in Britain, where he directed a feature film After the Verdict (1928) which was the first film to be shot at Wimbledon. He also worked on a number of short films. He returned to Germany in 1931 and directed a final film there, entitled The House of Dora Green (1933). Following the Nazi Party's rise to power in 1933, Galeen went into exile in Sweden before moving on to the United Kingdom and eventually to the United States. He had a summer home in Rochester or Granville, Vermont. He died in Randolph, Vermont in 1949, at age 68.

== Personal life ==
Galeen married a Swedish woman named Benedikta or Elvira in Switzerland on June 15, 1907. They had two children, Ivar, born in Switzerland, and Elvi, born in Germany. The couple divorced in 1947. In 1948 Galeen married Baronness Isle von Schenk.

== Selected filmography ==
Title	Year	Credited as				Notes	Ref(s)
Title	Year	Director	Screenwriter	Actor	Other	Notes	Ref(s)
The Golem	1915	Yes	Yes	Yes		as Trödler	
The Spinning Ball	1919		Yes				
Ruth's Two Husbands	1919		Yes				
The Forbidden Way	1920	Yes	Yes				
The Golem: How He Came into the World	1920		Yes				
Judith Trachtenberg	1920	Yes					
Roswolsky's Mistress	1921		Yes				
Nosferatu	1922		Yes				
City in View	1923	Yes	Yes				
The House Without Laughter	1923			Yes		as William Brent	
Dangerous Clues	1924		Yes	Yes		as Francis Margreit	
Waxworks	1924		Yes				
Die Liebesbriefe der Baronin von S...	1924	Yes	Yes				
Zigano	1925		Yes				
The Telephone Operator	1925		Yes				
Eyes Open, Harry!	1926		Yes				
The Student of Prague	1926	Yes	Yes				
Alraune	1928	Yes	Yes				
His Greatest Bluff	1928		Yes				
The Lady with the Mask	1928		Yes		Yes	Screen story writer	
Shadows of the Underworld	1931		Yes				
Bobby Gets Going	1931		Yes				
L'Auberge du père Jonas	1932		Yes				
Ombres des bas fonds	1932		Yes				
The House of Dora Green	1933	Yes					
Nosferatu the Vampyre	1979				Yes	Film credits "Based on Nosferatu by Henrik Galeen and Dracula by Bram Stoker"	
Nosferatu	2024				Yes	Film credits "Inspired by the Screenplay NOSFERATU by HENRIK GALEEN and the novel DRACULA by BRAM STOKER"	

== Sources ==
- Isenberg, Noah William (2009). Weimar Cinema: An Essential Guide to Classic Films of the Era. Columbia University Press. ISBN 9780231130554.
- Bock, Hans-Michael; Borgfelder, Tim (2009). The Concise Cinegraph. Encyclopedia of German Cinema. Berghahn Books. ISBN 978-0857455659.
