= Let Freedom Ring (film) =

1939 film by Jack Conway

- Directed by: Jack Conway
- Written by: Ben Hecht
- Produced by: Harry Rapf
- Starring: Nelson Eddy; Virginia Bruce; Victor McLaglen
- Cinematography: Sidney Wagner
- Edited by: Fredrick Y. Smith
- Music by: Arthur Lange
- Color process: Sepiatone
- Production company: Metro-Goldwyn-Mayer
- Distributed by: Loew's Inc.
- Release date: February 24, 1939
- Running time: 87 minutes
- Country: United States
- Language: English

Let Freedom Ring is a 1939 in Sepiatone Western directed by Jack Conway, starring Nelson Eddy and Virginia Bruce.

== Plot ==
The railroad is coming to Clover City. Railway owner Jim Knox (Edward Arnold) wants to increase his profit by purchasing more than just the right of way for his railroad. He wants the surrounding land and he is willing to use illegal methods to get what he wants. When Pop Wilkie (George 'Gabby' Hayes) refuses to sell, his home is burned to the ground. Witnesses are willing to testify that Knox's employee, Gagan (Trevor Bardette), started the fire but when the case is taken to the local court, Judge Bronson (Guy Kibbee), loyal to Knox, dismisses the charges.

Farmer Thomas Logan (Lionel Barrymore) also refuses to sell. Logan is expecting his son Steve (Nelson Eddy), a recent graduate of Harvard Law School, to fight for the rights of the farmers of Clover City. Knox visits Logan at his farm and while everyone is busy in the house, Gagan goes to the barn to start a fire. Steve Logan arrives. Assessing the hopelessness of fighting Knox in court, Steve pretends to side with Knox. Knox is puzzled as to why the fire wasn't set until Gagan is found unconscious thrown across the back of a horse with a note stating that he "forgot the matches."

The people of the town, who had been hoping for Steve to handle Knox, consider Steve a coward. Maggie Adams (Virginia Bruce), who runs the local restaurant, loves Steve but she can't forgive him for siding with Knox.

The only person in town who knows that Steve is not a coward is "the Mackerel" (Charles Butterworth) who sees that Steve was wounded the night that Gagan was found unconscious. He realizes it was Steve who fought with Gagan and prevented the farm from being burned down.

Knox has been paying the editor of the local paper, Underwood (Raymond Walburn), to make certain the newspaper is supportive of the railroad and supportive of Judge Bronson, who is up for re-election. Then, the railroad arrives in Clover City along with 250 railroad workers. Knox tells his men to make certain the workers are all registered to vote in the upcoming election.

Steve, with the help of the Mackerel, abducts Underwood, and steals the printing press and printing supplies. Keeping Underwood prisoner in a cave in the nearby mountains, they print newspapers exposing the corruption of Jim Knox and supporting the election of Thomas Logan as Judge. The newspapers are written under the pseudonym, "the Wasp." Steve and the Mackarel make certain the newspapers show up all over town. Knox, concerned, about the influence of the newspapers, offers a large reward for the capture of the Wasp. Chris Mulligan (Victor McLaglen) searches the mountains for the Wasp and is almost successful but he is headed off by the Mackerel who offers to search the immediate area and sends Mulligan to the next mountain over.

Maggie heads into the mountains to find the Wasp and warn him that Mulligan is searching for him but she finds Steve. She assumes Steve is searching for the Wasp. She leaves, expressing her disgust for him.

On the eve of the election, the Wasp is expected to pick up the latest edition of the paper which is being stored at the Logan Farm. Tom Logan and his friends are expecting the Wasp and they are surprised when Steve shows up to pick up the papers. Steve apologizes for deceiving his father but must leave quickly as Knox and his men have heard where the papers are stored and arrive looking for the Wasp. Steve gets away with the papers but Mulligan finds him. After a good fistfight, Steve is victorious over Mulligan, and he has won him over to his side. Steve distributes the papers and gives a stirring speech to the railway workers about freedom and liberty. Knox counters by telling the workers they will lose their jobs if they don't vote for Bronson. When all seems lost, Maggie begins singing "My Country, 'Tis of Thee." Steve joins in and soon almost everyone is singing. The workers are convinced. They will vote for Logan. Mulligan suggests to Knox that it would be best if he and his men left town.

== Cast ==
- Nelson Eddy as Steve Logan
- Virginia Bruce as Maggie Adams
- Victor McLaglen as Chris Mulligan
- Lionel Barrymore as Thomas Logan
- Edward Arnold as Jim Knox
- Guy Kibbee as David Bronson
- Charles Butterworth as The Mackerel
- H. B. Warner as Rutledge
- Raymond Walburn as Underwood
- Dick Rich as 'Bumper' Jackson
- Trevor Bardette as Gagan
- George 'Gabby' Hayes as 'Pop' Wilkie (as George F. Hayes)
- Louis Jean Heydt as Ned Wilkie
- Sarah Padden as 'Ma' Logan
- Eddie Dunn as 'Curly'
- Billy Bevan as Cockney
- Lionel Royce as German
- Luis Alberni Tony
- Emory Parnell as Axel – 1st Swede

== Soundtrack ==
- "Dusty Road"
- "Love Serenade"
- "Yankee Doodle"
- "Darling Nelly Gray"
- "Oh! Susanna"
- "I've Been Working on the Railroad"
- "Sobra las Olas"
- "Home! Sweet Home!"
- "Jeanie with the Light Brown Hair"
- "Ten Thousand Cattle Straying"
- "Pat, Sez He"
- "When Irish Eyes Are Smiling"
- "The Irish Washerwoman"
- "Where Else but Here"
- "My Country, 'Tis of Thee"

== Reception ==
The New York Times said the film was "sound dramatic stuff" with "vigor, good characterization and, fortunately, Mr. Eddy's singing."

== Alternative title ==
The film went through two titles changes while in production. It was originally to be titled "Song of the West" and was then changed to "Song of the Plains." It is known by these alternative titles in some overseas locations.
