= Hans Ehrenbaum-Degele =

German writer (1889–1915)

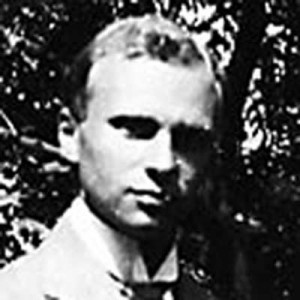
Hans Ehrenbaum-Degele

Hans Ehrenbaum-Degele (24 July 1889 – 28 July 1915) was a German writer.

He was born in Berlin, Germany, as a son of a wealthy Jewish banker. He was the partner of Friedrich Wilhelm Murnau and was a musician and wrote over 100 various pieces. He fought on the Russian front during the First World War, and was killed in action at Narev, Russian Empire, in 1915.
