= The House of Dora Green =

1933 film by Henrik Galeen

- Directed by: Henrik Galeen
- Written by: Bobby E. Lüthge
- Based on: Diplomatische Unterwelt by Hans Rudolf Berndorff
- Starring: Mady Christians; Paul Hartmann; Leonard Steckel; Alfred Abel
- Cinematography: Bruno Mondi
- Edited by: Martha Dübber
- Music by: Franz Grothe
- Production company: Tonfilm-Produktion
- Distributed by: National-Film
- Release date: 22 February 1933
- Running time: 78 minutes
- Country: Germany
- Language: German

The House of Dora Green (German: Salon Dora Green) is a 1933 German thriller film directed by Henrik Galeen and starring Mady Christians, Paul Hartmann, and Leonard Steckel. It was based on the novel Diplomatische Unterwelt by Hans Rudolf Berndorff. It was the final German film made by Galeen, before being forced into exile following the Nazi Party's takeover of power. The film's sets were designed by the art director Gustav A. Knauer. In 1937 it was released in the United States.

== Synopsis ==
Foreign spies hired to steal a technological breakthrough enlist the unwitting assistance of cabaret singer Dora Green. After she discovers their true intentions, she helps the authorities thwart their scheme.

== Cast ==
- Mady Christians as Dora Green
- Paul Hartmann as Frank Gebhard
- Leonard Steckel as Sucharow
- Alfred Abel as Iwan Keller
- Betty Bird as Ellen Brinkmann
- Fritz Alberti as Kapitän Brinkman
- Anita Mey as Lola
- John Mylong as Pilarsky
- Fritz Odemar as Dimitri
- Gustav Püttjer as Adler
- Willi Schur as Gregor
- Walter Steinbeck as Der Kommissar
- Erwin van Roy as Der Conferencier
- Kurt Vespermann as Thomas

== Bibliography ==
- Bock, Hans-Michael; Bergfelder, Tim, eds. (2009). The Concise Cinegraph: Encyclopaedia of German Cinema. New York: Berghahn Books. ISBN 978-1-57181-655-9.
- Waldman, Harry (2008). Nazi Films in America, 1933–1942. Jefferson, NC: McFarland. ISBN 978-0-7864-3861-7.
