= Friedrich Sieburg =

German journalist

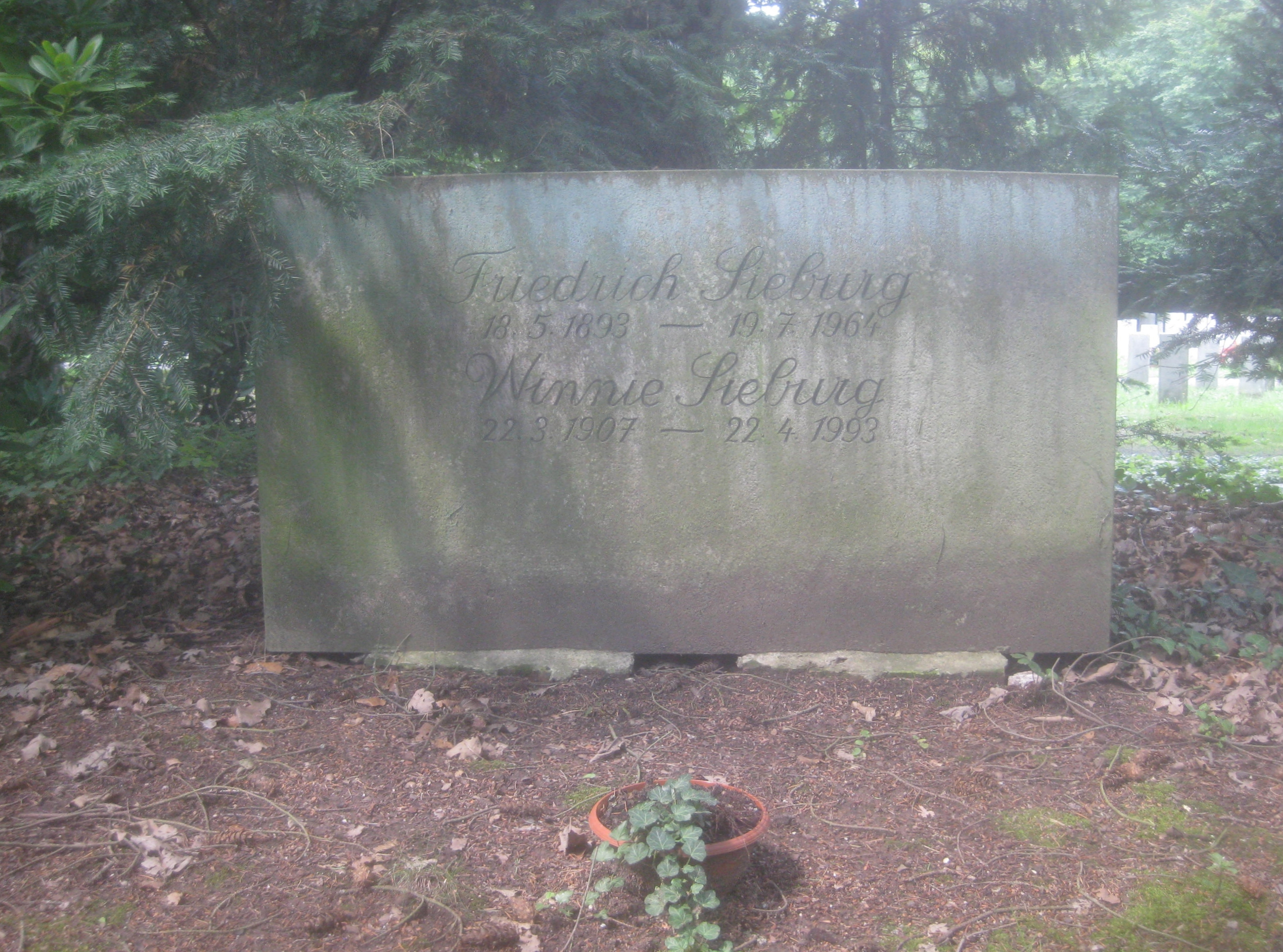

Friedrich Sieburg (1893–1964) was a German journalist. He was born in Altena and died in Gärtringen.

== Selected works ==
- Gott in Frankreich? Societät-Verlag, Frankfurt 1929 (französische Übersetzung Dieu est-il français? 1930)
- 1910-1930 : zwanzig Jahre Weltgeschichte in 700 Bildern. Berlin : Transmare Verlag, [1931]
- Frankreichs rote Kinder. Societäts-Verlag, 1931; 2. Aufl. Wunderlich, Tübingen 1949
- Es werde Deutschland. Societäts-Verlag 1933
- Polen, Legende und Wirklichkeit. Societäts-Verlag 1934
- Robespierre. Societäts-Verlag 1935
- Afrikanischer Frühling. Eine Reise. Societäts-Verlag 1938
- Blick durchs Fenster. Aus 10 Jahren Frankreich und England. Societäts-Verlag 1939
- Die stählerne Blume. Eine Reise nach Japan. Societäts-Verlag 1939
- La fleur d'acier (Voyage au Japon). Grasset, Paris 1942
- Schwarzweiße Magie. Über die Freiheit der Presse, Wunderlich, Tübingen 1949
- Unsere schönsten Jahre. Ein Leben mit Paris. Wunderlich 1950
- Was nie verstummt. Begegnungen. Wunderlich 1951
- Geliebte Ferne. Der schönsten Jahre anderer Teil. Wunderlich 1952
- Die Lust am Untergang. Selbstgespräche auf Bundesebene. Rowohlt 1954; wieder: Eichborn 2010 ISBN 3-8218-6229-7
- Napoleon. Die hundert Tage. Deutsche Verlagsanstalt DVA, Stuttgart 1956
- Chateaubriand. Romantik und Politik. DVA 1959
- Das Geld des Königs. Eine Studie über Colbert. Deutsche Verlagsanstalt, Stuttgart 1960
- Lauter letzte Tage. Prosa aus zehn Jahren. Deutsche Verlagsanstalt, Stuttgart 1961
- Napoleon: Die 100 Tage. Ullstein 1987, ISBN 3-548-37054-3
- Abmarsch in die Barbarei. Gedanken über Deutschland. Hg. Klaus Harpprecht, DVA 1983
- Zur Literatur: 1924–1956. Hrsg. Fritz Raddatz, Ullstein 1987 ISBN 3-548-37061-6
- Zur Literatur: 1957–1963. Hrsg. Fritz Raddatz, Ullstein 1987 ISBN 3-548-37062-4

=== Selected filmography ===
- City in View (1923)
