= Nights of Terror =

Nights of Terror may refer to:

- Burial Ground (film), also known as Nights of Terror, a 1981 Italian grindhouse zombie film
- Nights of Terror (1921 film), a 1921 German silent horror film
