= Leopold Jessner =

German film producer (1878–1945)

- Born: 3 March 1878
- Died: 13 December 1945 (aged 67)
- Occupations: Producer and director
- Notable work: Hintertreppe

Leopold Jessner (3 March 1878 – 13 December 1945) was a noted producer and director of German Expressionist theater and cinema. His first film, Hintertreppe (1921), is considered a major turning point which paved the way for the later German Expressionist experiments of German filmmakers F.W. Murnau, Fritz Lang, and G.W. Pabst.

A native of Königsberg, Jessner was a touring actor in his youth and turned to directing in 1911. He was director of the Berlin State Theater from 1919 to 1925 and was known for bare stages in which flights of steps served as different spaces for scenes and directing actors to act in an oversimplified, unnatural manner.

Hintertreppe (German for Backstairs), Jessner's first film (co-directed with Paul Leni), exemplified Jessner's use of heavily stylized staircases. These staircases would become regular fixtures in later German films, nicknamed "Jessnertreppe" in Jessner's honor, and would be used to full effect in the 1926 German Expressionist film Faust, directed by F.W. Murnau.

As a Jew and a Socialist, he was forced to emigrate to the United States in 1933, after Adolf Hitler came to power in Germany. He worked in film anonymously in Los Angeles until his death.

== Filmography ==
- Hintertreppe (1921; directed with Paul Leni)
- Earth Spirit (1923)
- Mary Stuart (1927; directed with Friedrich Feher)
- Children of the Fog (1935)

== See also ==
- The Continental Players
