= To the Ladies' Paradise =

1922 film

- Directed by: Lupu Pick
- Written by: Émile Zola (novel); Hans Marr; Lupu Pick
- Produced by: Lupu Pick
- Cinematography: Willy Gaebel; Theodor Sparkuhl; Gotthardt Wolf
- Production company: Rex-Film
- Distributed by: UFA
- Release date: 5 October 1922
- Country: Germany
- Languages: Silent; German intertitles

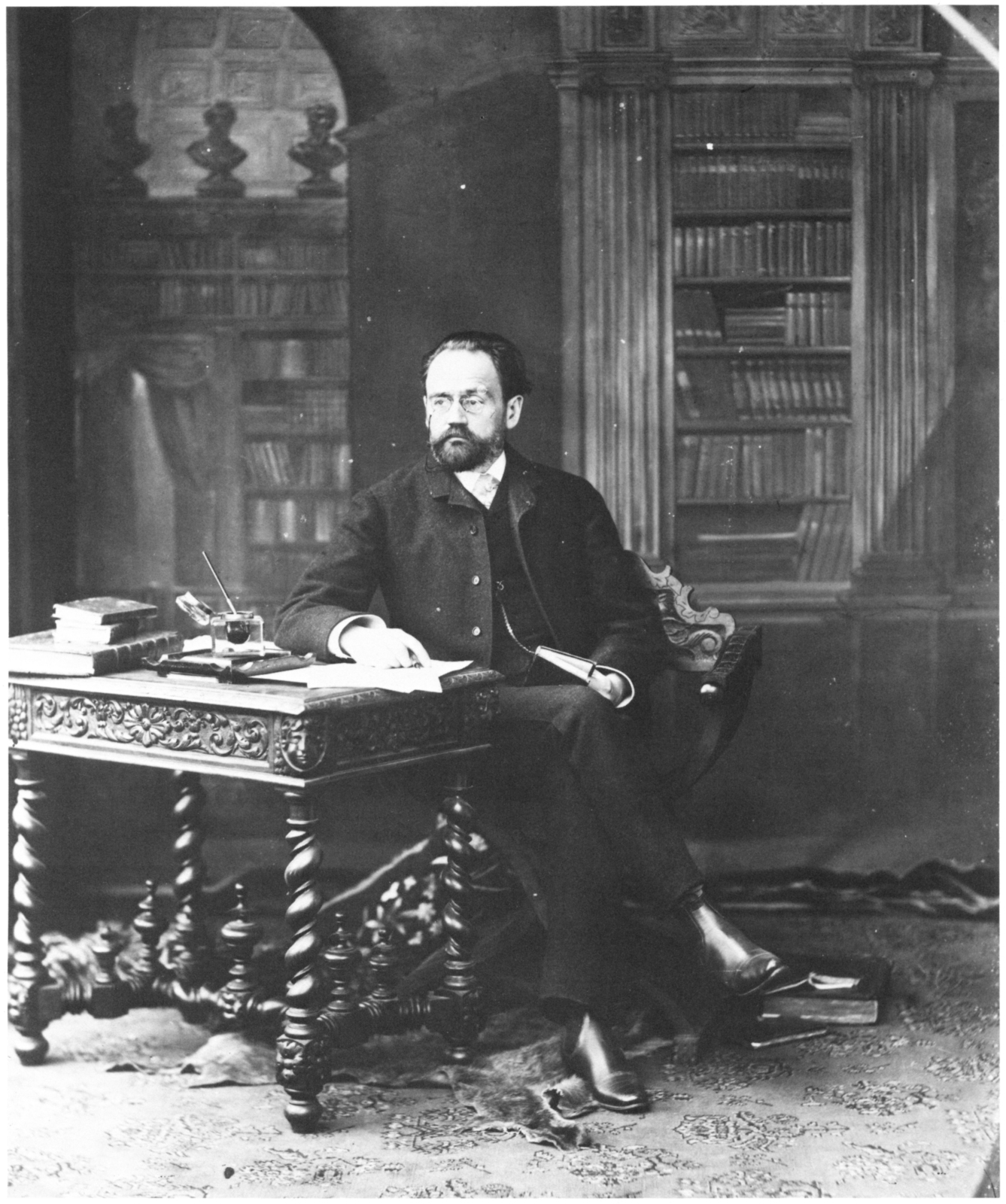

To the Ladies' Paradise (German: Zum Paradies der Damen) is a 1922 German silent film directed by Lupu Pick. It is based on the 1883 novel Au Bonheur des Dames by Emile Zola.

The film's sets were designed by the art director Robert A. Dietrich.

== Cast ==
- Edith Posca
- Lupu Pick
- Harry Nestor
- Walter Brügmann
- Mathilde Sussin
- Hermann Picha
- Olga Limburg
- Leopold von Ledebur

== Bibliography ==
- Taylor, Richard. The BFI companion to Eastern European and Russian cinema. BFI Publishing, 2000.
