= Nobody Knows (1920 film) =

1920 film

- Directed by: Lupu Pick
- Written by: Artur Landsberger (novel); Gerhard Lamprecht; Lupu Pick
- Produced by: Lupu Pick
- Starring: Lupu Pick; Eduard Rothauser; Edith Posca
- Cinematography: Ivar Petersen
- Production company: Rex-Film
- Distributed by: Martin Dentler
- Release date: 9 July 1920
- Country: Germany
- Languages: Silent; German intertitles

Nobody Knows (German: Niemand weiß es) is a 1920 German silent drama film directed by Lupu Pick and starring Pick, Eduard Rothauser and Edith Posca.

== Cast ==
- Lupu Pick as Richter
- Eduard Rothauser as Brendes
- Edith Posca as Helene Brendes
- Melitta Ferrow as Gerda
- Johannes Riemann as Jörn
- Meinhart Maur as Ein Gast
- Fritz Beckmann as Amtsdiener
- Sophie Pagay as Wirtschafterin

== Bibliography ==
- Bock, Hans-Michael & Bergfelder, Tim. The Concise CineGraph. Encyclopedia of German Cinema. Berghahn Books, 2009.
