= F. W. Murnau =

German film director (1888–1931)

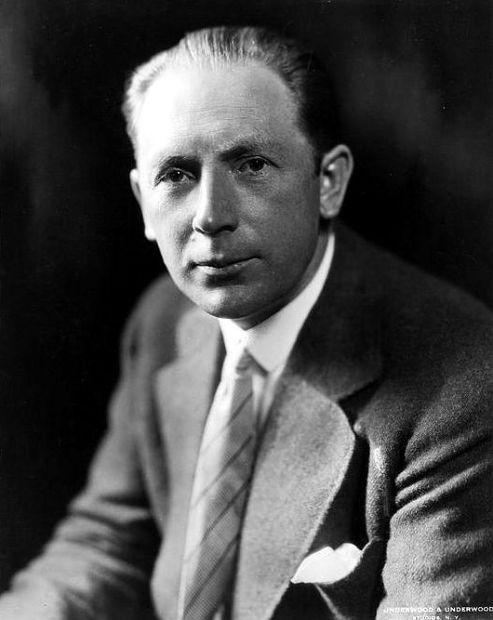
- Murnau c. 1920–1930
- Born: Friedrich Wilhelm Plumpe; 28 December 1888; Bielefeld, German Empire
- Died: 11 March 1931 (aged 42); Santa Barbara, California, U.S.
- Burial place: Stahnsdorf South-Western Cemetery
- Education: University of Berlin; University of Heidelberg
- Occupations: Film director; producer; screenwriter
- Years active: 1919–1931
- Movement: German Expressionism
- Military career
- Allegiance: German Empire
- Branch: Imperial German Army; Luftstreitkräfte
- Conflicts: World War I: Eastern Front

Friedrich Wilhelm Murnau (né Plumpe; 28 December 1888 – 11 March 1931) was a German film director, producer, and screenwriter. He is regarded as one of cinema's most influential filmmakers for his work in the silent era.

An erudite child with an early interest in film, Murnau eventually studied philology and art before director Max Reinhardt recruited him to his acting school. During World War I, he served in the Imperial German Army, initially as an infantry company commander and communications officer and later with the German Army's Flying Corps as an observer/gunner. He survived several crashes without any severe injuries.

Murnau's first directorial work premiered in 1919, but he did not attain international recognition until the 1922 film Nosferatu, an unauthorized adaptation of Bram Stoker's 1897 novel Dracula. Although not a commercial success owing to copyright issues with author Stoker's estate, the film is considered a masterpiece of German Expressionist cinema and an early cult film. Murnau later directed the film The Last Laugh (1924), as well as a 1926 interpretation of Goethe's Faust. He immigrated to Hollywood in 1926, where he joined the Fox Studio and made three films: Sunrise (1927), 4 Devils (1928) and City Girl (1930). Sunrise has been regarded by critics and film directors as among the best films ever made.

Murnau travelled to Bora Bora to make the film Tabu (1931) with documentary film pioneer Robert J. Flaherty, although disputes with Flaherty led Murnau to finish the film on his own. A week before the successful opening of Tabu, Murnau died in a California hospital from injuries sustained in an automobile crash. Of the 21 films Murnau directed, eight are now considered to be completely lost. One reel of his feature Marizza, genannt die Schmuggler-Madonna survives. This leaves only 12 films surviving in their entirety.

== Early years ==
Friedrich Wilhelm Plumpe was born in Bielefeld. By the age of seven, he was living in Kassel. He had two brothers, Bernhard and Robert, and two stepsisters, Ida and Anna. His mother, Otilie Volbracht, was the second wife of his father, Heinrich Plumpe (1847–1914), an owner of a cloth factory in the northwest part of Germany. Their villa was often turned into a stage for little plays, directed by the young Friedrich, who had already read books by Schopenhauer and Nietzsche, as well as plays by Shakespeare and Ibsen, by the age of 12. From 1910, Plumpe would take the pseudonym of "Murnau" from the town of Murnau am Staffelsee south of Munich, where he lived for a time. The young Murnau was said to have an icy, imperious disposition and an obsession with film. Some reference sources list him as being almost 210 cm (7 ft) tall, others however list him with a more modest 193 cm (6 ft 4).

Murnau studied philology at the University in Berlin and later art history and literature in Heidelberg, where director Max Reinhardt saw him at a students' performance and decided to invite him to his actor-school. He soon became a friend of Franz Marc (the Blue Rider artist based in Murnau), Else Lasker-Schüler and Hans Ehrenbaum-Degele. During World War I, Murnau served as a company commander on the Eastern Front. He then joined the Imperial German Flying Corps and flew missions in northern France as a combat pilot for two years, surviving eight crashes without severe injuries. After landing in Switzerland, he was arrested and interned for the remainder of the war. In his POW camp, he was involved with a prisoner theater group and wrote a film script.

== Career ==
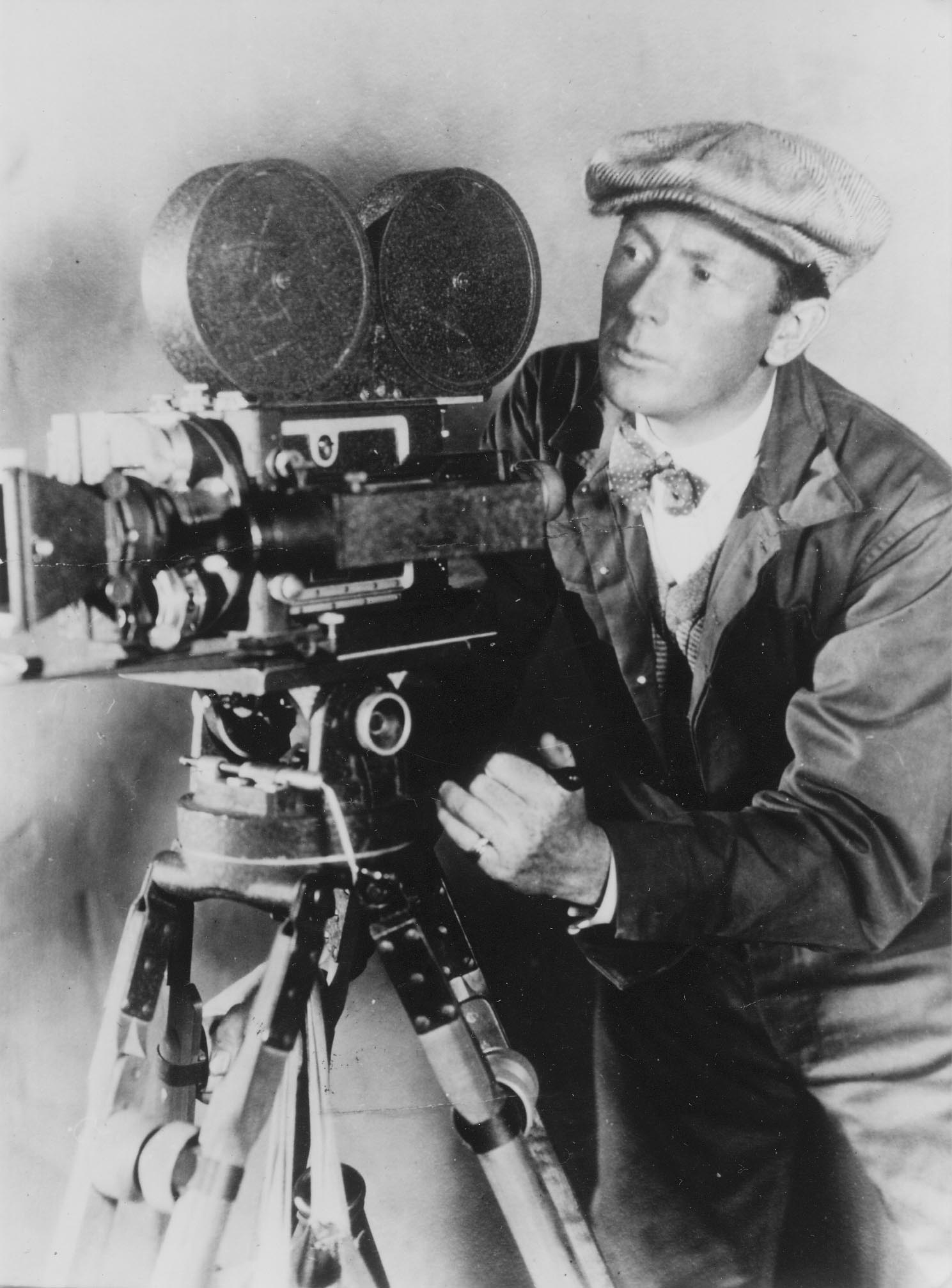
Murnau shooting a film in 1920

After World War I ended, Murnau returned to Germany, where he soon established his own film studio with actor Conrad Veidt. His first feature-length film, The Boy in Blue (1919), was a drama inspired by the Thomas Gainsborough painting and by Oscar Wilde's novel The Picture of Dorian Gray. He explored the theme of dual personalities, much like Robert Louis Stevenson's Dr. Jekyll and Mr. Hyde, in the lost film Der Januskopf (1920) starring Veidt and featuring Bela Lugosi.

Murnau's best known film is Nosferatu (1922), an adaptation of Bram Stoker's Dracula (1897), starring German stage actor Max Schreck as the vampire Count Orlok. The release would be the only one by Prana Film because the company declared itself bankrupt in order to avoid paying damages to Stoker's estate (acting for the author's widow, Florence Stoker) after the estate won a copyright infringement lawsuit. Apart from awarding damages, the court also ordered all existing prints of the film to be destroyed. However, one copy had already been distributed globally. This print, which has been duplicated time and again by a cult following over the years, has made Nosferatu an early example of a cult film.

Murnau also directed The Last Laugh (German: Der letzte Mann, (The Last Man), 1924), written by Carl Mayer (a very prominent figure of the Kammerspielfilm movement) and starring Emil Jannings. The film introduced the subjective point of view camera, where the camera "sees" from the eyes of a character and uses visual style to convey a character's psychological state. It also anticipated the cinéma vérité movement in its subject matter. The film also used the "unchained camera technique", a mix of tracking shots, pans, tilts, and dolly moves. Also, unlike the majority of Murnau's other works, The Last Laugh is considered a Kammerspielfilm with Expressionist elements. Unlike expressionist films, Kammerspielfilme are categorized by their chamber play influence, involving a lack of intricate set designs and story lines / themes regarding social injustice towards the working classes.

Murnau's last German film was the big budget Faust (1926) with Gösta Ekman as the title character, Emil Jannings as Mephisto and Camilla Horn as Gretchen. Murnau's film draws on older traditions of the legendary tale of Faust as well as on Goethe's classic version. The film is well known for a sequence in which the giant, winged figure of Mephisto hovers over a town sowing the seeds of plague.

Nosferatu (music by Hans Erdmann) and Faust (music by Werner R. Heymann) are two early films that feature original film scores.

=== Hollywood ===
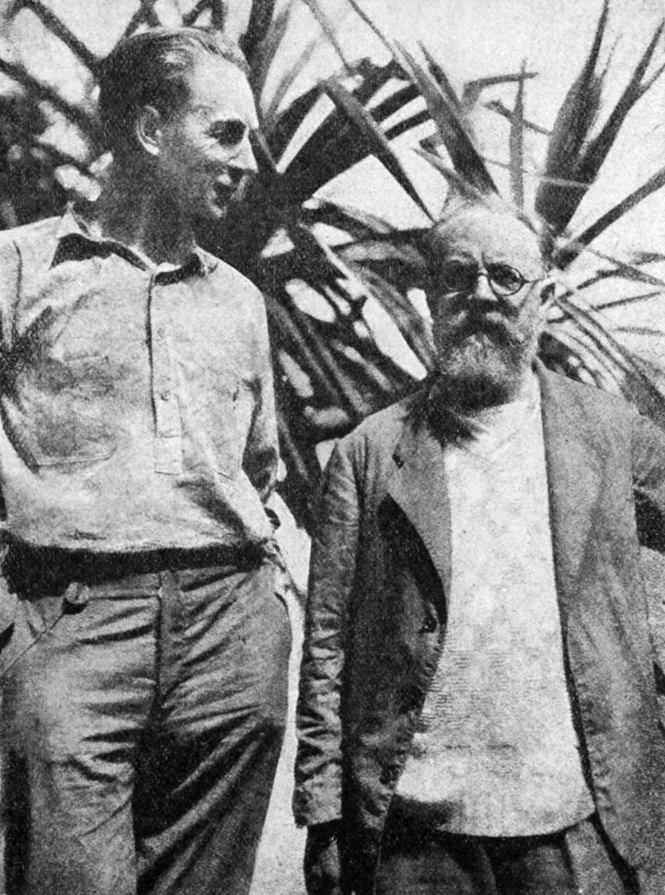
Murnau with Henri Matisse in Tahiti in 1930

Murnau immigrated to the United States in 1926, where he joined the Fox Studio and made Sunrise: A Song of Two Humans (1927), a movie often cited by scholars as one of the greatest of all time. Released in the Fox Movietone sound-on-film system (music and sound effects only), Sunrise was not a financial success, but received several Oscars at the very first Academy Awards ceremony in 1929. In winning the Academy Award for Unique and Artistic Production it shared what is now the Best Picture award with the movie Wings. The first Academy Award for Best Actress went to Janet Gaynor for this and two other films that year; afterward, each award was limited to work in a single film. In spite of this, Murnau was financially well off, and purchased a farm in Oregon.

Murnau's next two films, the (now lost) 4 Devils (1928) and City Girl (1930), were modified to adapt to the new era of sound film and were not well received. Their poor receptions disillusioned Murnau, and he quit Fox to journey for a while in the South Pacific.

Together with documentary film pioneer Robert J. Flaherty, Murnau traveled to Bora Bora to make the film Tabu in 1931. Flaherty left after artistic disputes with Murnau, who had to finish the movie himself. The movie was censored in the United States for its images of bare-breasted Polynesian women. The film was originally shot by cinematographer Floyd Crosby as half-talkie, half-silent, before being fully restored as a silent film — Murnau's preferred medium.

== Personal life ==
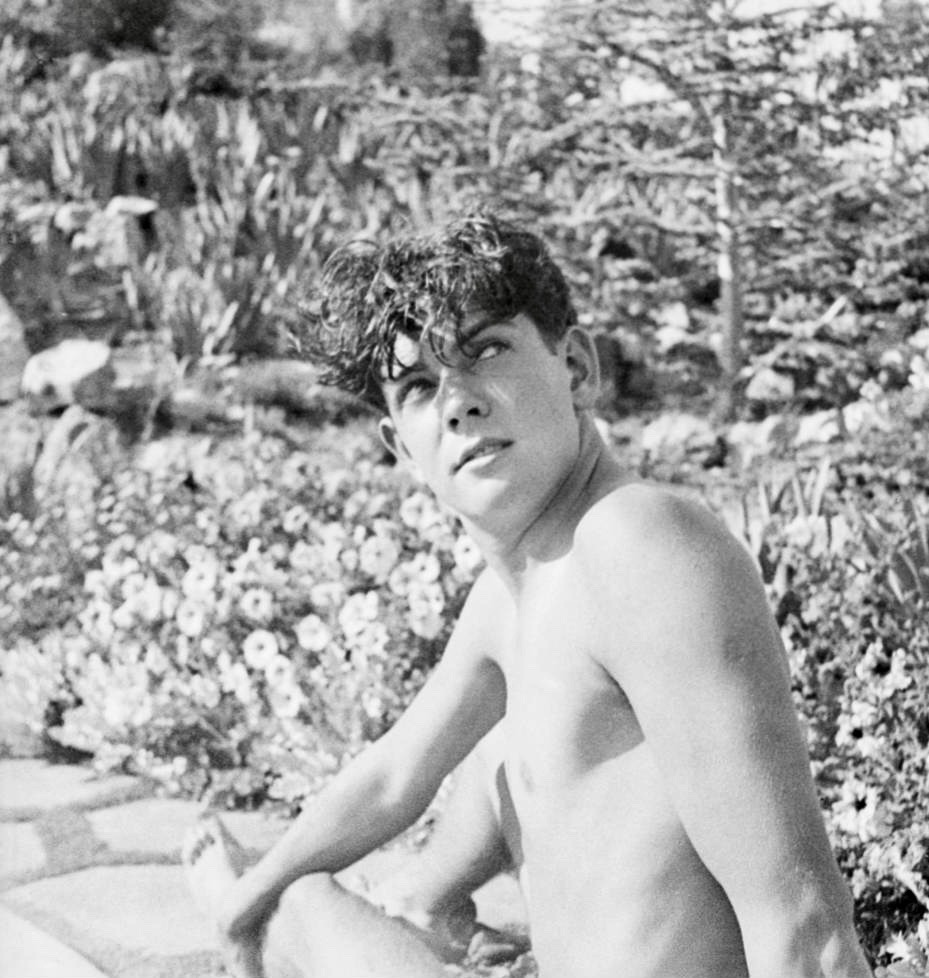
Actor David Rollins sits unclothed in a 1927 photo taken by Murnau.

Murnau joined the German air force as a radio operator in 1916. In December 1917 he had to make an emergency landing in Switzerland and was interned until the end of the war.

Murnau was gay. His friend and lover, the poet Hans Ehrenbaum-Degele, also served in the war but was killed on the eastern front in 1915. This had a profound effect on Murnau, who drew from the horrors of loss, sacrifice and the violence of war in his film work. It was Ehrenbaum who introduced Murnau to the work of expressionists such as Franz Marc and Else Lasker-Schüler.

In Hollywood, Murnau reportedly became enamored with the young actor David Rollins, whom he invited to his home. In late 1927, Murnau convinced Rollins to pose nude, with the pool and garden of the Wolf's Lair in Hollywood serving as the backdrop. In a later interview Rollins claimed to have been puzzled and surprised by the request, but felt comfortable enough with his body to oblige.

== Death ==
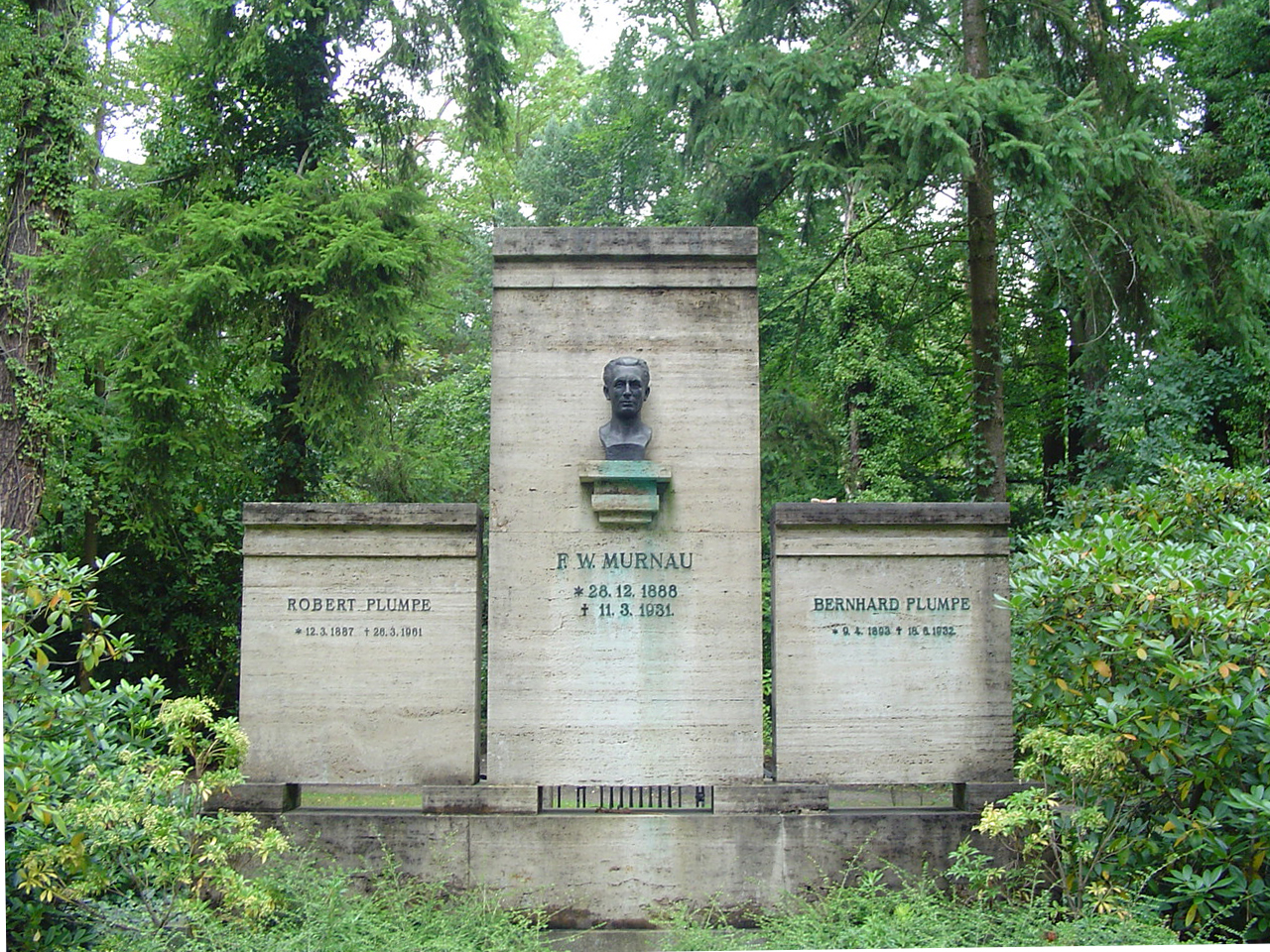
Grave and bust by Ludwig Manzel in Stahnsdorf South-Western Cemetery

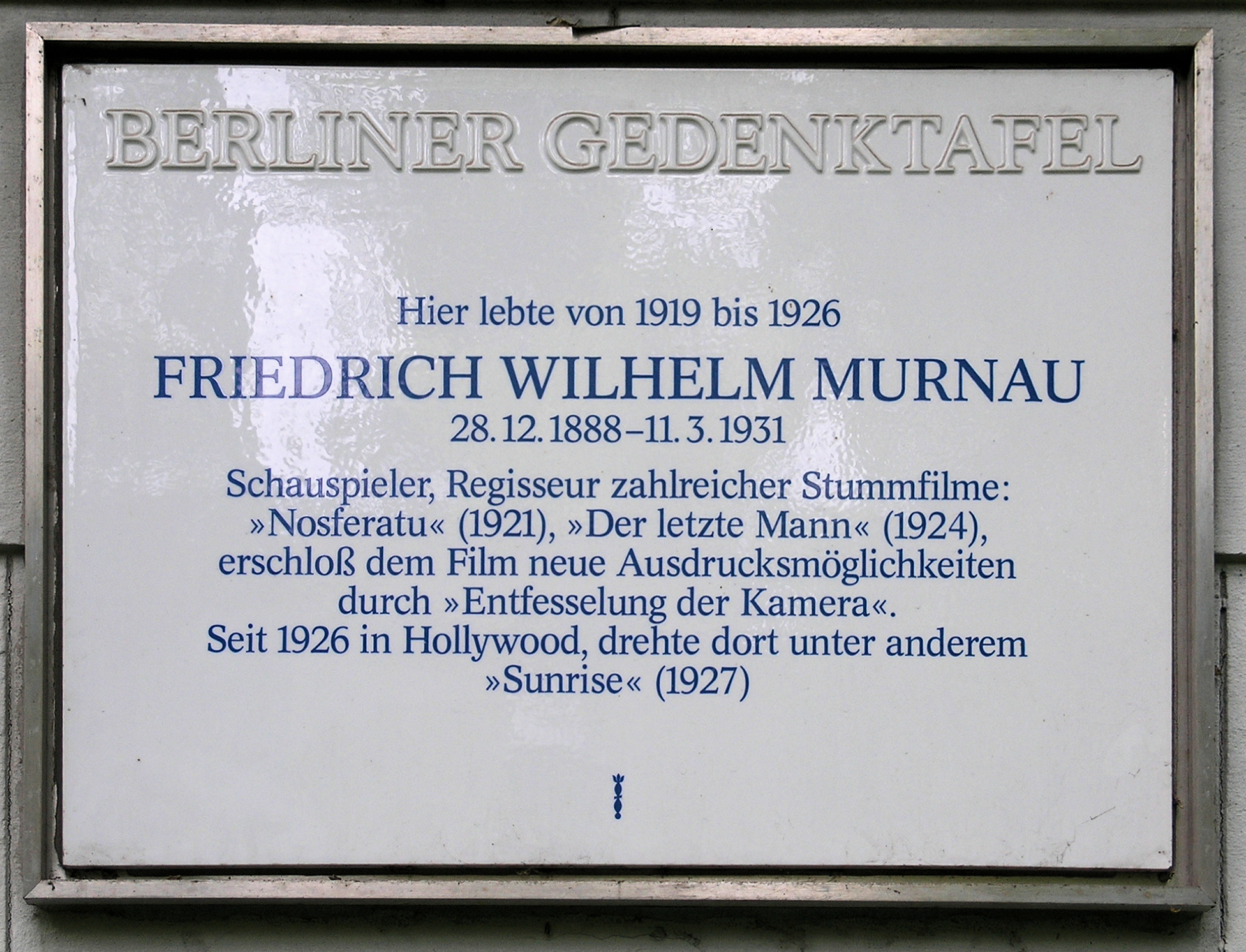
Murnau's memorial plaque in Berlin

On 10 March 1931, a week prior to the opening of the film Tabu, Murnau drove up the Pacific Coast Highway from Los Angeles, California, in a rented Packard touring car. Murnau's valet, Eliazar Garcia Stevenson (2 September 1900 – 4 October 1985), swerved to avoid a truck that unexpectedly veered into the northbound lane. The car overturned after striking an embankment, throwing all occupants out of the vehicle. Murnau suffered a head injury and died the next day at the Santa Barbara Cottage Hospital.

A service was held for Murnau at the Hollywood Lutheran Church on 19 March 1931. His body was transported to Germany, where he was entombed in Stahnsdorf South-Western Cemetery, near Berlin, on 13 April. Among the attendees of his second funeral were Robert J. Flaherty, Emil Jannings, and Fritz Lang, who delivered the eulogy. Greta Garbo commissioned a death mask of Murnau which she kept on her desk during her years in Hollywood.

In July 2015, Murnau's grave was broken into, the remains disturbed and the skull removed by persons unknown. Wax residue was reportedly found at the site, leading some to speculate that candles had been lit, perhaps with an occult or ceremonial significance. As this disturbance was not an isolated incident, the cemetery managers were considering sealing the grave. The skull has not been recovered since.

== Legacy ==
American author Jim Shepard based his 1998 novel Nosferatu on Murnau's life and films. The book began as a short story from Shepard's 1996 collection Batting Against Castro.

In 2000, director E. Elias Merhige released Shadow of the Vampire, a fictionalization of the making of Nosferatu. Murnau is portrayed by John Malkovich. In the film, Murnau is so dedicated to making the film genuine that he actually hires a real vampire (Willem Dafoe) to play Count Orlok.

In the film Vampires vs. the Bronx, released in 2020, homage is paid to Murnau by making reference to him in the film via a company named "Murnau Properties," whose logo was the woodcutting view of Vlad the Impaler. Murnau Properties was the shell company owned by vampires, whose plan was to take over the Bronx via property acquisitions and blood acquisitions.

The short movie F.W.M. Symphony (AT 2022) is based on the theft of Murnau's head: the skull stolen from the film director's Berlin tomb in 2015 becomes the anchor of a narrative which splices fictional and historical identities.

== Filmography ==
Original title	English title	Year	Notes	Ref.
Der Knabe in Blau	The Boy in Blue / Emerald of Death	1919	Lost film, minor fragments survive	
Satanas	Satan	1920	Lost film, minor fragments survive	
Der Bucklige und die Tänzerin	The Hunchback and the Dancer	1920	Lost film	
Der Januskopf	Dr. Jekyll and Mr. Hyde / The Head of Janus	1920	Lost film	
Abend – Nacht – Morgen	Evening – Night – Morning	1920	Lost film	
Sehnsucht	Desire: The Tragedy of a Dancer	1921	Lost film	
Der Gang in die Nacht	Journey into the Night	1921		
Schloß Vogelöd	The Haunted Castle / Castle Vogeloed	1921		
Marizza, genannt die Schmuggler-Madonna	Marizza, called the Smuggler Madonna	1922	Mostly lost, one reel survives	
Der brennende Acker	The Burning Soil	1922	Considered lost until 1978, when a print was discovered	
Nosferatu: eine Symphonie des Grauens	Nosferatu: a Symphony of Horror	1922		
Phantom		1922		
Die Austreibung	The Expulsion	1923	Lost film	
Comedy of the Heart		1924	Writer only	
Die Finanzen des Großherzogs	The Grand Duke's Finances	1924		
Der letzte Mann	The Last Laugh	1924		
Tartüff	Tartuffe	1926		
Faust		1926	Last German film	
Sunrise: A Song of Two Humans		1927		
4 Devils		1928	Lost film	
City Girl		1930		
Tabu: A Story of the South Seas		1931	Posthumous release (Died one week before New York premiere)	

== Sources ==
- Eisner, Lotte (1973). F. W. Murnau. Univ of California Press. ISBN 978-0-520-02285-0 – via Google Books.
- Kardozi, Karzan (2024). 100 Years of Cinema, 100 Directors, Vol 6: F. W. Murnau. Xazalnus Publication – via The Moving Silent.
- Rosales, Manuel (2022). Friedrich Wilhelm Murnau. Ediciones Cátedra Cátedra Publication – via Cátedra Cátedra.
