= The Forbidden Way =

1920 film

- Directed by: Henrik Galeen
- Written by: Henrik Galeen; John Gottowt
- Produced by: Lupu Pick
- Starring: Lupu Pick; John Gottowt; Edith Posca
- Cinematography: Friedrich Weinmann
- Music by: Fritz Bartsch
- Production company: Rex-Film
- Release date: 20 August 1920
- Country: Germany
- Languages: Silent; German intertitles

The Forbidden Way (German: Der verbotene Weg) is a 1920 German silent film directed by Henrik Galeen and starring Lupu Pick, John Gottowt, and Edith Posca.

== Cast ==
- Lupu Pick as Amtsmann
- John Gottowt as Lucas
- Edith Posca as Susanne
- Lina Lossen as Frau Amtmann
- Wilhelm Diegelmann as Amtsvorsteher
- Eugen Rex as Amtsdiener
- Sophie Pagay

== Bibliography ==
- Bock, Hans-Michael; Bergfelder, Tim, eds. (2009). The Concise Cinegraph: Encyclopaedia of German Cinema. New York: Berghahn Books. ISBN 978-1-57181-655-9.
