= Harry Nestor =

Austrian actor

- Born: Franz Harry Pridun; 11 March 1893; Vienna, Austria-Hungary
- Died: 11 November 1969 (aged 76); Vienna, Austria
- Other names: Nestor Ariani

Harry Nestor (born Franz Harry Pridun; 11 March 1893 – 11 November 1969) was an Austrian actor.

== Selected filmography ==
- The Secret of the Mummy (1921)
- The Bull of Olivera (1921)
- To the Ladies' Paradise (1922)
- City in View (1923)
- Everybody's Woman (1924)
- Modern Marriages (1924)
- Curfew (1925)
- The Great Opportunity (1925)
- Boarding House Groonen (1925)
- Orphan of Lowood (1926)
- Our Daily Bread (1926)
- The Pride of the Company (1926)
- Superfluous People (1926)
- Lützow's Wild Hunt (1927)
- Two Under the Stars (1927)
- The Transformation of Dr. Bessel (1927)
- Eddy Polo in the Wasp's Nest (1928)
- A Knight in London (1929)
- The Third Confession (1929)
- On the Reeperbahn at Half Past Midnight (1929)
- The Man with the Frog (1929)
- Ship in Distress (1929)
- The Tender Relatives (1930)
- Nights of Princes (1930)
- The Man in the Dark (1930)
- Two People (1930)
- Three Days of Love (1931)
- Alarm at Midnight (1931)
- The Woman They Talk About (1931)
- In the Name of the Law (1932)
- The Naked Truth (1932)

== Bibliography ==
- Kulik, Karol. Alexander Korda: The Man Who Could Work Miracles. Virgin Books, 1990.
