= Shattered (1921 film) =

1921 film

- Werner Krauss in Shattered
- Directed by: Lupu Pick
- Written by: Carl Mayer; Lupu Pick
- Produced by: Lupu Pick
- Starring: Werner Krauss; Edith Posca; Hermine Straßmann-Witt
- Cinematography: Friedrich Weinmann
- Music by: Giuseppe Becce; Alexander Schirmann
- Production company: Rex-Film GmbH
- Distributed by: Film Arts Guild
- Release date: 27 May 1921
- Running time: 50 minutes
- Country: Germany
- Language: Silent film

Shattered (German: Scherben) is a 1921 German silent Kammerspielfilm directed by Lupu Pick, written by Carl Mayer, and is considered to be the earliest example of the kammerspielfilm.

== Plot ==
It is winter. A railway worker's family lives a monotonous and impoverished life next to a railway line. A telegram announces the arrival of an inspector who also intends to live with the family.

No sooner has he arrived than the railway worker's daughter succumbs to his temptations. Alerted by noises, the mother forces her way into the inspector's locked room with an axe and discovers her daughter. Shocked, she seeks solace in her faith and runs to a cross with a holy image at the edge of the woods, where she freezes to death while praying. The railway worker notices her absence the next morning, finds her dead, and is devastated.

The daughter begs the inspector for a marriage proposal, but he coldly rejects her. She then tells her father what happened. Politely, he knocks on the inspector's door, but when the inspector refuses to budge, he strangles him.

The next day, the railway worker stoically goes about his duties. He stops a train and confesses to the driver: "I am a murderer!" His daughter wanders around the snowy landscape, bewildered, and watches the train depart.

== Cast ==
- Werner Krauss as the signalman
- Edith Posca as the signalman's daughter
- Hermine Straßmann-Witt as the signalman's wife
- Paul Otto as the section inspector
- Lupu Pick as Reisender
