= Kammerspielfilm =

German film genre

Kammerspielfilm is a type of German film that offers an intimate, cinematic portrait of lower middle class life.

== History ==
The name derives from a theater, the Kammerspiele, opened in 1906 by a major stage director Max Reinhardt to show intimate dramas to small audiences. Few Kammerspiel films were made, but nearly all are classics. Kammerspielfilme (the plural form) formed a German film movement of the 1920s silent film era that was developed around the same time as the more commonly known Expressionist movement in cinema. The Kammerspielfilm was known as the "chamber drama" as a result of the influence from the theatrical form of the chamber play. It is distinguished by its focus on character psychology and its lack of intricate set design. Also, unlike Expressionist films, Kammerspielfilme rarely used intertitles to narrate the story.

== Prominent figures ==
- Lupu Pick
- F. W. Murnau
- Carl Mayer
- Georg Wilhelm Pabst
- Carl Theodor Dreyer

== See also ==
- Shattered
- The Last Laugh
- German Expressionism
- German film history
- Alfred Hitchcock – influenced by Kammerspielfilm

== Sources ==
- Bordwell, David, and Kristin Thompson. 1997. Film Art: An Introduction. 5th, international ed. New York: McGraw-Hill. ISBN 978-0-07-114073-7.
- Parkinson, David. 1995. History of Film. World of Art ser. London: Thames and Hudson. ISBN 978-0-500-20277-7.
