= Night Terror =

Night Terror or Night Terrors may refer to:

== Arts and entertainment ==
- Night Terror (Soulcalibur), a fictional character in the fighting game Soulcalibur III
- Night Terrors (novel), a Buffy novel by Alice Henderson

=== Film and television ===
- Night Terror (film), a 1977 television thriller film directed by E. W. Swackhamer
- Night Terrors (film), a 1993 horror film directed by Tobe Hooper
- "Night Terrors" (Star Trek: The Next Generation), a 1991 television episode
- "Night Terrors" (Doctors), a 2002 television episode
- "Night Terrors" (Doctor Who), a 2011 television episode
- "Night Terrors" (Scooby-Doo! Mystery Incorporated), a 2012 television episode

=== Music ===
- "Night Terror", a song by Dream Theater on Parasomnia
- "Night Terror", a song by English singer Laura Marling
- "Night Terrors", a song by Static-X on Start a War
- "Night Terrors", a song by Warmen on Here for None

== Other uses ==
- Night terror, a medical condition

== See also ==
- Terror by Night, a 1946 Sherlock Holmes crime drama
