= Nights of Terror (1921 film) =

1921 film

- Directed by: Lupu Pick
- Written by: Carl Mayer
- Produced by: Lupu Pick
- Starring: Edith Posca; Alfred Abel; Arnold Korff
- Cinematography: Theodor Sparkuhl
- Production company: Rex-Film
- Release date: 25 August 1921
- Running time: 83 minutes
- Country: Germany
- Languages: Silent; German intertitles

Nights of Terror (German: Grausige Nächte) is a 1921 German silent horror film directed by Lupu Pick and starring Edith Posca, Alfred Abel and Arnold Korff.

The film's sets were designed by the art director Robert A. Dietrich.

== Plot ==
Young Evelyne lives with her fiancé, Frank, with whom she has a child. However, her fiancé is a disreputable man and a heavy drinker. When she tries to leave him, the drunkard runs off with the boy out of pure revenge. Years pass, and Evelyne has since married the equally respected and wealthy Consul Whist. The marriage remains childless, and her maternal instincts and her desire to find her once-stolen child grow all the stronger.

Evelyne sets out on a search and one day actually finds him. She believes she recognizes her son in a particular boy and promptly adopts him. But with what she thinks is her own flesh and blood, she has brought evil into her home. Gruesome, eerie nights await her: jewelry disappears and the safe is broken into. Doubts begin to creep into Evelyne's mind: is this child, whose evil face seems increasingly alien to her, really her son? Indeed, the devilish child is caught red-handed during his robbery. In the process, the consul is shot and the lady of the house is nearly strangled.

Evelyne realizes she's been the victim of a massive deception. "Her boy" is actually a Lilliputian, a criminal individual involved in a highly criminal enterprise with her depraved ex-fiancé and his lover, Worrit, the Lilliputian's mother. But justice ultimately prevails. Evelyne locates her real child and is reunited with him. Now, nothing stands in the way of a happy family life.

== Cast ==
- Edith Posca as Evelyne Whist
- Alfred Abel as Frank Cunning
- Arnold Korff as Consul George Whist
- Adele Sandrock as Old Worrit
- Paula Eberty as Polly, the Consul's maid
- Paul Walker as Roddy
- Waldemar Pottier as Jonny, Evelyne's son

== Bibliography ==
- Kreimeier, Klaus. The Ufa Story: A History of Germany's Greatest Film Company, 1918-1945. University of California Press, 1999.
