= Unchained camera technique =

1924 innovation allowing motion picture cameras to move during shots

The unchained camera technique (entfesselte Kamera in German) was an innovation by cinematographer Karl Freund that allowed filmmakers to get shots from cameras in motion enabling them to use pan shots, tracking shots, tilts, crane shots, etc.

The technique was introduced by Freund in the 1924 silent film The Last Laugh and is arguably the most important stylistic innovation of the 20th century, setting the stage for some of the most commonly used cinematic techniques of modern contemporary cinema.
