= Marta Mierendorff =

German sociologist (1911-2002)

- Born: 1911; Charlottenburg, Berlin, Germany
- Died: May 30, 2002 (aged 90–91); West Hollywood, California
- Education: Humboldt University
- Known for: The study of exiles
- Spouse: Gottfried Saloman
- Scientific career
- Fields: Sociology
- Workplaces: University of Southern California

Marta Mierendorff (1911-May 30, 2002) was a German typist, art sociologist, and researcher. She was a professor in the Department of German at the University of Southern California (USC). She was made a USC Emeritus Research Professor in 1984.

== Life before and during World War II ==
Mierendorff did a student internship in the Wriezen studio of Arno Breker, a German architect and sculptor. She acted as a typist in his studio. After World War II, Mierendorff reflected on her time in Breker's studio, writing

"In early 1944, gigantic plaster figures of heroes and women were scattered over the area at great distances. Barges brought stones and plaster. In the apprentice workshops, Hitler heads and imperial eagles were churned out almost non-stop."

Mierendorff and her husband Gottfried Saloman were living in Berlin in the 1930s and 1940s. Saloman was Jewish and died in 1943 or 1944 in the Auschwitz concentration camp, as part of The Holocaust. A collection of 1938-1939 correspondences between Mierendorff and Saloman is stored in the archives of the Leo Baeck Institute and the Center for Jewish History. As the war came to an end in Europe, the Russian army advanced through German and culminated in the 1945 Battle of Berlin, which lasted from April 16 to May 2. Mierendorff was living with her mother in Lichtenberg on April 21, 1945. In her diary, she wrote:

"The dreaded and long-awaited hour has come. When will we see the first Russians? How will they deal with the population?"

== Academics and art sociology work ==
Mierendorff received her doctorate in sociology in 1949 from the Humboldt University of Berlin. She co-founded the Institut fuer Kunstsoziologie (Institute for Art Sociology) with Heinrich Tost, a German expressionist, in 1954.
