= Earth Spirit (film) =

1923 film directed by Leopold Jessner

- Directed by: Leopold Jessner
- Written by: Frank Wedekind (play); Carl Mayer
- Produced by: Richard Oswald
- Starring: Asta Nielsen; Albert Bassermann; Carl Ebert; Gustav Rickelt
- Cinematography: Axel Graatkjær
- Production company: Richard Oswald-Film
- Distributed by: Richard Oswald-Film
- Release date: 22 February 1923
- Country: Germany
- Languages: Silent; German intertitles

Earth Spirit (German: Erdgeist) is a 1923 German silent drama film directed by Leopold Jessner and starring Asta Nielsen, Albert Bassermann and Carl Ebert. It is based on the 1895 play of the same name by Frank Wedekind. It premiered in Berlin on 22 February 1923.

== Plot ==
Dr. Schön marries a lower-class girl, Lulu. Young and voluptuous, she attracts the attention of all the men, but the doctor will not let her go. After Lulu shoots the doctor, his son has to make a serious decision.

== Cast ==
- Asta Nielsen as Lulu
- Albert Bassermann as Dr. Schoen
- Carl Ebert as Schwarz
- Gustav Rickelt as Dr. Goll
- Rudolf Forster as Alwa Schoen
- Alexander Granach as Schigolch
- Heinrich George as Rodrigo
- Erwin Biswanger as Eulenber
- Julius Falkenstein
- Lucy Kieselhausen
- Anton Pointner

== Bibliography ==
- Grange, William (29 September 2008). Cultural Chronicle of the Weimar Republic. Scarecrow Press, Bloomsbury Publishing PLC. ISBN 978-0-8108-5967-8 – via Internet Archive.
