= Lupu Pick =

German actor

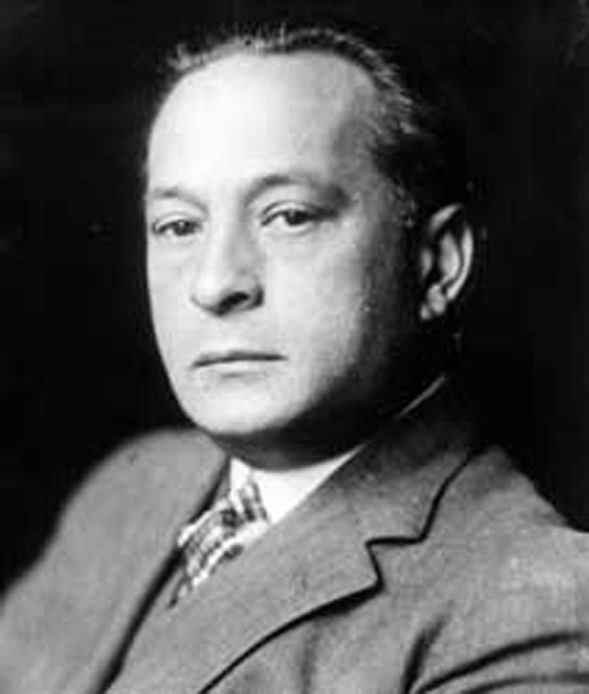
- Born: 2 January 1886; Iaşi, Romania
- Died: 7 March 1931 (aged 45); Berlin, Germany
- Occupations: Actor, film director
- Years active: 1910–1931
- Spouse: Edith Posca

Lupu Pick (2 January 1886 – 7 March 1931) was a Romanian-German actor, film director, producer, and screenwriter of the silent era. He appeared in 50 films between 1910 and 1928.

Born in Romania, Pick's father was a Jewish Austrian, and his mother of Romanian origin. He began as a stage actor in Hamburg, Flensburg and Berlin before 1910. In 1917 he founded the film company Rex-Film AG.

He served on the board of the Film Association of Industrialists (Vorstand des Verbandes der Filmindustriellen), SPIO and the Film Directors Association of Germany (Verbandes der Filmregisseure Deutschlands) and worked intensively to establish the union-based umbrella organization of Filmmakers in Germany (Filmschaffenden Deutschlands) (Dacho). He was the organization's first chairman.

Pick was married to actress Edith Posca.

== Selected filmography ==
- Die geheimnisvolle Villa (1914)
- No Sin on the Alpine Pastures (1915)
- A Night of Horror (1916)
- The Uncanny House (1916)
- Tales of Hoffmann (1916)
- Frank Hansen's Fortune (1917)
- The Lord of Hohenstein (1917)
- Mountain Air (1917)
- Let There Be Light (1917)
- The Picture of Dorian Gray (1917)
- The Mirror of the World (1918)
- The Serenyi (1918)
- The Forbidden Way (1920)
- Nobody Knows (1920)
- Shattered (1921)
- Nights of Terror (1921)
- To the Ladies' Paradise (1922)
- City in View (1923)
- New Year's Eve (1924)
- The Last Horse Carriage in Berlin (1926)
- The Armoured Vault (1926)
- Countess Ironing-Maid (1926)
- Grandstand for General Staff (1926)
- The House of Lies (1926)
- The Girl with the Five Zeros (1927)
- Family Gathering in the House of Prellstein (1927)
- Spies (1928)
- A Knight in London (1929)
- The Street Song (1931)
