= The Page from the Dalmasse Hotel =

The Page from the Dalmasse Hotel (German:Der Page vom Dalmasse-Hotel) may refer to

- The Page from the Dalmasse Hotel (novel), a novel by Maria von Peteani
- The Page from the Dalmasse Hotel (1933 film), a German film directed by Victor Janson
- The Page from the Dalmasse Hotel (1958 film), an Austrian film directed by Thomas Engel. German title: Der Page vom Palast-Hotel
