= Martha Ziegler =

German actress

- Born: 20 March 1899; Darmstadt, German Empire
- Died: 2 December 1957 (aged 58); Darmstadt, West Germany
- Occupation: Film actress
- Years active: 1930–1949

Martha Ziegler (German: [ˈmaʁta ˈtsiːɡlɐ]; 20 March 1899 – 2 December 1957) was a German actress.

== Life ==
Martha Ziegler was born in the German Empire in Darmstadt on March 20, 1899. After completing her high school education, she attended drama school in Frankfurt, and then found acting work in a series of roles over the years at Berlin's Schiller Theater and in Düsseldorf, Hamburg, and Frankfurt am Main.

In 1928, she was awarded legal protection against the Landestheater Darmstadt.

By the time she was in her early 30s, she was steadily employed in Germany's movie business, making an average of three to four films per year. In 1930, she appeared in Abschied, the first sound film produced by UFA (Universum Film).

As a member of record of the Genossenschaft Deutscher Bühnenangehöriger ("Guild of the German Stage"), she automatically became a member of arts groups which were strongly tied to Joseph Goebbels when the GDBA and similar organizations were forceably merged into the Reichsfilmkammer under Nazi Germany's nationalization of the film industry during the mid-1930s. In the lead-up to, and during, World War II, she then appeared in at least two films considered by historians to have been Nazi propaganda films, including: Frisians in Peril (released in 1935, re-released in 1941) and Die vier Musketiere.

== Selected filmography ==
- Farewell (1930)
- The Little Escapade (1931)
- The Scoundrel (1931)
- The Captain from Köpenick (1931)
- The Wrong Husband (1931)
- I'll Stay with You (1931)
- One Night with You (1932)
- Eight Girls in a Boat (1932)
- Sacred Waters (1932)
- Things Are Getting Better Already (1932)
- Hände aus dem Dunkel (1933)
- There Is Only One Love (1933)
- Little Girl, Great Fortune (1933)
- Must We Get Divorced? (1933)
- The Page from the Dalmasse Hotel (1933)
- The Four Musketeers (1934)
- Frisians in Peril (1935)
- One Too Many on Board (1935)
- Inkognito (1936)
- Thunder, Lightning and Sunshine (1936)
- Dissatisfied Woman (1936)
- Carousel (1937)
- The Girl at the Reception (1940)
- The Waitress Anna (1941)
- Das Mädchen Juanita (1945)
- The Murder Trial of Doctor Jordan (1949)

== Bibliography ==
- Richards, Jeffrey (1973). Visions of Yesterday. London: Routledge & K. Paul. ISBN 978-0-7100-7576-5.
