= Jessie Vihrog =

German actress

- Born: 19 October 1906; Kimberley, South Africa
- Died: 1 January 1996 (aged 89); Berlin, Germany
- Occupation: Actress
- Years active: 1931–1949 (film)

Jessie Vihrog (19 October 1906 – 1 January 1996) was a South African-born German film actress.

== Selected filmography ==
- The Wrong Husband (1931)
- Hooray, It's a Boy! (1931)
- Contest (1932)
- The Ladies Diplomat (1932)
- Things Are Getting Better Already (1932)
- Two Good Comrades (1933)
- The Castle in the South (1933)
- A Song for You (1933)
- The Gentleman from Maxim's (1933)
- Charley's Aunt (1934)
- The Brenken Case (1934)
- The Girlfriend of a Big Man (1934)
- Decoy (1934)
- The Sun Rises (1934)
- A Woman with Power of Attorney (1934)
- Frisians in Peril (1935)
- The Decoy (1935)
- Don't Lose Heart, Suzanne! (1935)
- Street Music (1936)

== Bibliography ==
- Hull, David Stewart (1969). Film in the Third Reich: A Study of the German Cinema, 1933–1945. Berkeley: University of California Press. ISBN 978-0-520-01489-3.
