= Little Girl, Great Fortune =

1933 film

- Directed by: E. W. Emo
- Written by: Max W. Kimmich; Hans Julius Wille
- Produced by: Guido Bagier
- Starring: Dolly Haas; Carl Esmond; Adele Sandrock
- Cinematography: Robert Baberske; Georg Bruckbauer; Walter Pindter
- Edited by: W. L. Bagier
- Music by: Harald Böhmelt
- Production company: Tofa-Film
- Release date: 24 October 1933
- Running time: 76 minutes
- Country: Germany
- Language: German

Little Girl, Great Fortune (German: Kleines Mädel – großes Glück) is a 1933 German comedy film directed by E. W. Emo and starring Dolly Haas, Carl Esmond, and Adele Sandrock. It was shot at the Johannisthal Studios in Berlin. The film's sets were designed by the art director Fritz Maurischat.A separate Italian version One Night with You was also made.

== Cast ==
- Dolly Haas as Annie Schierke
- Carl Esmond as Georg Hellwig
- Adele Sandrock as Die Gräfin
- Theo Lingen as Benzig, Besitzer der Audag
- Reva Holsey as Gertrud, Komtesse Haubenkegel
- Robert Thiem as Graf Egon
- Franz Klebusch
- Charlie Kracker
- Erich Radlof
- Paul Rehkopf
- Eugen Rex as Schlossermeister Schierke
- Franz Weber as Lawyer Streitmann
- Martha Ziegler

== Bibliography ==
- Bock, Hans-Michael; Bergfelder, Tim, eds. (2009). The Concise Cinegraph: Encyclopaedia of German Cinema. New York: Berghahn Books. ISBN 978-1-57181-655-9.
- Klaus, Ulrich J. Deutsche Tonfilme: Jahrgang 1933. Klaus-Archiv, 1988.
