= Decoy (1934 film) =

1934 film directed by Hans Steinhoff

- Film poster
- Directed by: Hans Steinhoff
- Written by: Philipp Lothar Mayring; Ludwig von Wohl
- Produced by: Karl Ritter
- Starring: Jakob Tiedtke; Viktor de Kowa; Jessie Vihrog
- Cinematography: Konstantin Irmen-Tschet
- Edited by: Willy Zeyn
- Music by: Friedrich Wilhelm Rust
- Production company: UFA
- Distributed by: UFA
- Release date: 10 November 1934
- Running time: 99 minutes
- Country: Germany
- Language: German

Decoy (German: Lockvogel) is a 1934 German adventure film directed by Hans Steinhoff and starring Jakob Tiedtke, Viktor de Kowa, and Jessie Vihrog. A separate French-language version, The Decoy, was released the following year with a largely different cast. It was shot at the Babelsberg Studios and on location in Hamburg, Turkey and the North Sea. The film's sets were designed by the art directors Artur Günther and Fritz Maurischat.

== Synopsis ==
A young man is asked by his jeweler father to take a valuable necklace from Istanbul to Marseille. While on the sea voyage he is targeted by a gang of thieves, using a beautiful woman as a decoy. He is eventually assisted by another woman who is secretly in love with him.

== Cast ==
- Jakob Tiedtke as Juwelier Schott
- Viktor de Kowa as Schott junior
- Jessie Vihrog as Sibyl Termeer
- Fritz Rasp as de Groot, ihr Vormund
- Hilde Weissner as Delia Donovan
- Oskar Sima as Makarian
- Paul Westermeier as Robert, Kapitän
- Gerhard Bienert as 1. Offizier an Bord der 'Adrian Termeer'
- Hugo Fischer-Köppe as 2. Offizier an Bord der 'Adrian Termeer'
- Gertrud Wolle as Dame an Bord
- Hans Hermann Schaufuß as Herr an Bord
- Egon Brosig
- Josef Dahmen as Bandit
- Alfred Gerasch as Perser
- Inge Kadon as Perserin
- Sonja Krenzisky as Bumbawa
- Hede Mehrmann as Weisse Tänzerin
- Gustav Püttjer as Matrose
- Louis Ralph as Bandit
- Ernst Rotmund as Kriminallkommisar
- Werner Stock as Matrose

== Criticism ==
Karlheinz Wendtland confirmed that the film was "designed with speed and all the refinements". Furthermore, he was of the opinion that the film adaptation was not lacking in humor and that it was "completely apolitical despite the director Steinhoff".

== Bibliography ==
- Bock, Hans-Michael; Bergfelder, Tim, eds. (2009). The Concise Cinegraph: Encyclopaedia of German Cinema. Berghahn Books. ISBN 978-1-57181-655-9.
