= Dolly Haas =

German actress (1910–1994)

- Haas in 1955
- Born: Dorothy Clara Louise Haas; April 29, 1910; Hamburg, Germany
- Died: September 16, 1994 (aged 84); New York City, U.S.
- Occupations: Actress, singer
- Years active: 1927–1981
- Spouse(s): John Brahm (m. 1937; div. 1941); Al Hirschfeld (m. 1943)

Dorothy Clara Louise Haas (29 April 1910 – 16 September 1994) was a German-American actress and singer who played in German and American films. After moving to the United States, she often appeared in Broadway plays. She became a naturalized US citizen and married Al Hirschfeld, a noted portraitist and caricaturist in New York City.

== Life and work ==
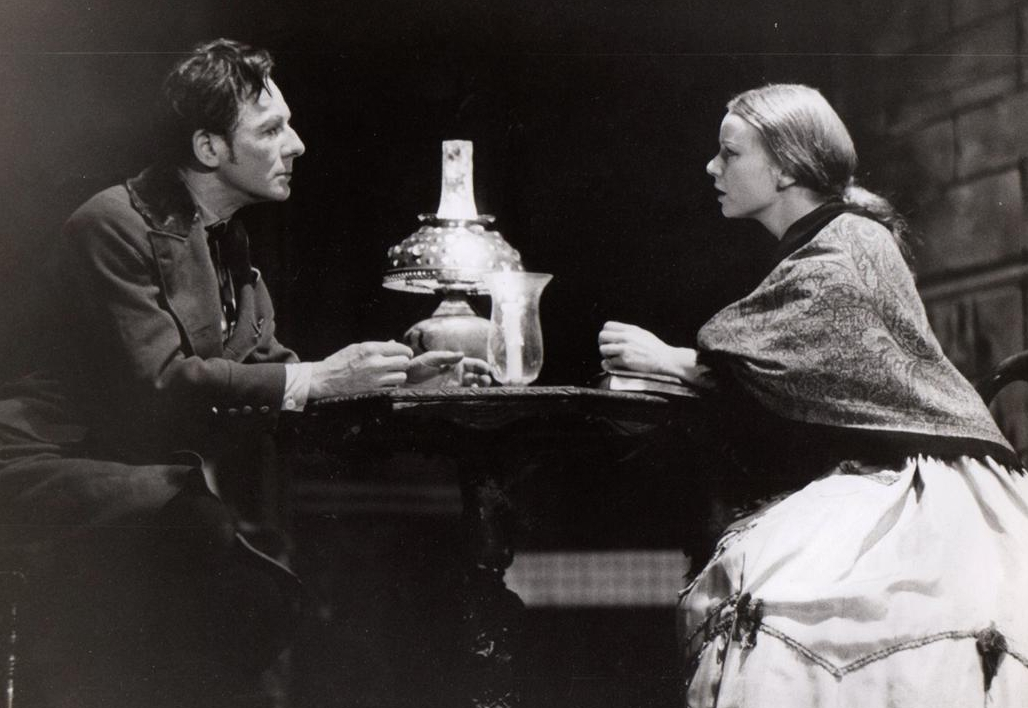
Gielgud and Haas in Crime and Punishment

Haas was born in Hamburg, Germany, to Charles Oswald Haas, a bookseller of British-German origin, and Margarethe (née Jagemann) on 29 April 1910. She was already an accomplished actress in German cinema before moving to the United States.

Her father Charles was half-German, but had grown up in England, and had British citizenship. Dolly and her sister, Margarete, attended Jacob Loewenberg's girls' school Lyzeum in Hamburg, the Anerkannte höhere Mädchenschule. The Haas family's personal records, including diaries and letters, are currently held by the Center for Jewish History in New York City, New York.

== Marriage and family ==
Haas married German-born film director John Brahm. At one time, he was resident director for acting troupes such as Deutsches Theater and the Lessing Theater, both in Berlin. They divorced in 1941.

After moving to the US, Haas became a naturalized U.S. citizen. She married again in 1943, to Al Hirschfeld in Baltimore, Maryland. They lived in New York, where he worked for The New York Times as a portraitist and caricaturist. His work was also published in The New York Review of Books. They had a daughter, Nina, born in 1945.

== Career ==
Dolly Haas had her debut as a professional actress in 1927 in Berlin. She worked at the city's Großes Schauspielhaus theatre, before embarking on a film career. The latter took her to England and to Hollywood, United States.

Haas enjoyed a brief but successful stage career in the United States as well. She made her New York stage debut in 1941 in Erwin Piscator's production of The Circle of Chalk. She also performed with John Gielgud and Lillian Gish in the 1947 revival of Crime and Punishment.

In 1946 Haas followed Mary Martin in the lead role in Lute Song for the touring production. Her co-star, Yul Brynner, said that Haas's casting substantially improved the show. He said, "Dolly Haas understood the part. She had an affinity for it, and the play immediately improved. It wasn't at all that Dolly was a better actress. She was just better casting for the part than Mary."

Mary Martin agreed with Brynner's assessment, and helped Haas to prepare for the role in the short time allotted for rehearsal. Haas also performed in Off Broadway productions of The Threepenny Opera and Brecht on Brecht.

Although Haas did not appear in many English language films, she had an important role in Alfred Hitchcock's 1953 film, I Confess. Haas was a personal friend of Hitchcock, and he cast her as Alma Keller, the wife of the murderer—janitor Otto Keller. This high-profile film also starred Montgomery Clift, Anne Baxter, Karl Malden and Brian Aherne.

== Death ==
Haas died 16 September 1994 from ovarian cancer in New York City, aged 84.

== Filmography ==
- Dolly Gets Ahead (1930) - Dolly Klaren
- One Hour of Happiness (1931) - Die Puppe
- Der Ball (1931) - Antoinette Kampf
- The Virtuous Sinner (1931) - Hedwig Pichlers-Tochter
- Liebeskommando (1931) - Antonia
- You Don't Forget Such a Girl (1932) - Lisa Brandes
- Things Are Getting Better Already (1932) - Edith
- A Tremendously Rich Man (1932) - Dolly
- Scampolo (1932) - Scampolo
- Großstadtnacht (1932) - Madeleine Duchanef
- Das häßliche Mädchen (1933) - Lotte
- The Little Crook (1933) - Annette
- Little Girl, Great Fortune (1933) - Annie Schierke
- The Page from the Dalmasse Hotel (1933) - Friedel Bornemann
- Ein Mädel mit Tempo (1934) - Susanne 'Susi' Wegener - Tochter
- Girls Will Be Boys (1934) - Pat Caverley
- Warum lügt Fräulein Käthe? (1935) - Käthe Wilkens - Fotografin
- Broken Blossoms (1936) - Lucy
- Star for a Night (1936) - Chorine (uncredited)
- Spy of Napoleon (1936) - Eloise
- Carefree (1938) - Minor Role (uncredited)
- The Bank Dick (1940) - Script Girl (uncredited)
- Unfinished Business (1941) - Woman (uncredited)
- I Married an Angel (1942) - Infanta (uncredited)
- Du Barry Was a Lady (1943) - Miss April (uncredited)
- The Merry Widow (1952) - First Little Girl (uncredited)
- I Confess (1953) - Alma Keller
- Main Street to Broadway (1953) - Herself (uncredited)
- Armstrong Circle Theatre (1954, TV Series) - Sister Madeline
- Studio One (1950-1956, TV Series) - Mrs. Kneiper (final appearance)
