= Al Hirschfeld =

American caricaturist (1903–2003)

Albert Hirschfeld
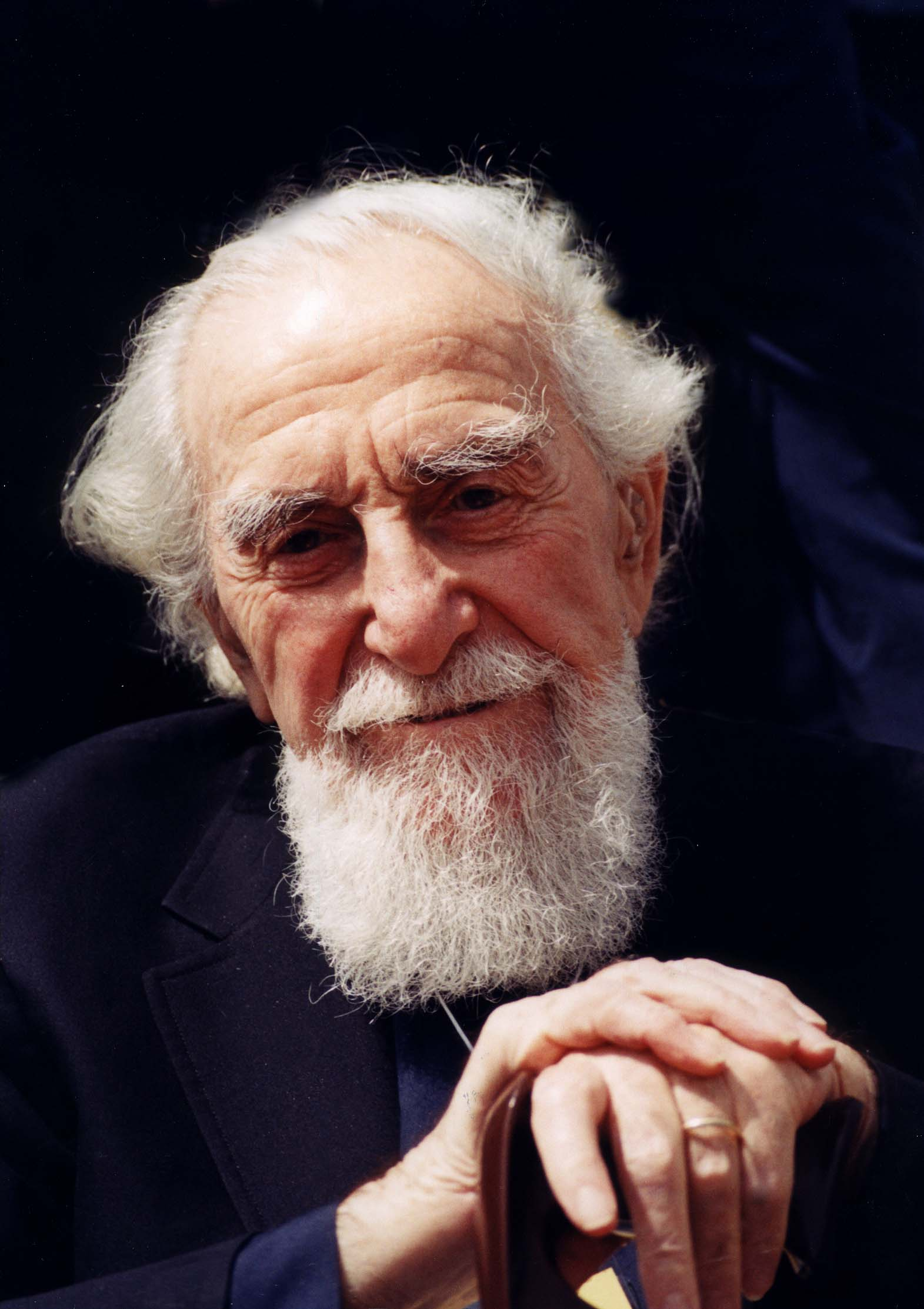
- Hirschfeld in April 2000
- Born: June 21, 1903; St. Louis, Missouri, U.S.
- Died: January 20, 2003 (aged 99); New York City, New York, U.S.
- Education: Art Students League of New York
- Spouses: Florence Ruth Hobby (divorced); Dolly Haas (m. 1943; died 1994); Louise Kerz (m. 1996)
- Children: 1

Albert Hirschfeld (June 21, 1903 – January 20, 2003) was an American caricaturist best known for his black-and-white portraits of celebrities and Broadway stars.

== Early life and career ==
Al Hirschfeld was born in 1903 in a two-story duplex apartment at 1313 Carr Street in St. Louis, Missouri. His father, Isaac, was a German-Jewish traveling salesman, while his mother, Rebecca, was from a family of Orthodox Russian Jews. His maternal grandparents refused to eat in his parents' non-kosher home. He talked about how the family would not permit bread in the house during Passover; during that time the family ate matzah and ham sandwiches.

He moved with his family to New York City in 1915, where he received art training at the Art Students League in Midtown Manhattan and the National Academy of Design in Carnegie Hill, Manhattan. In 1924, Hirschfeld traveled to Paris and London, where he studied painting, drawing, and sculpture. When he returned to the United States, a friend, fabled Broadway press agent Richard Maney, showed one of Hirschfeld's drawings to an editor at the New York Herald Tribune, which got Hirschfeld commissions for the newspaper before he moved to The New York Times.

Hirschfeld's style was unique, and he was considered to be one of the most important figures in contemporary drawing and caricature, having influenced countless artists, illustrators, and cartoonists. His caricatures were regularly drawings of pure line in black ink, for which he used a genuine crow quill.

Readers of The New York Times, and other newspapers prior to widespread color print, will be most familiar with the Hirschfeld drawings that are black ink on white illustration board. However, there is a whole body of Hirschfeld's work in color. His full-color paintings were commissioned by many magazines, often as the cover. Examples are found in TV Guide, Life, The American Mercury, Look, The New York Times Magazine, the New Masses, and Seventeen. He also illustrated many books in color, most notably among them Harlem as Seen by Hirschfeld, with text by William Saroyan.

CBS commissioned him to illustrate a preview magazine featuring the network's new television programming in fall 1963. One of the programs was Candid Camera, and Hirschfeld's caricature of the show's host Allen Funt outraged Funt so much he threatened to leave the network if the magazine was published. Hirschfeld prepared a slightly different likeness, perhaps more flattering, but he and the network pointed out to Funt that the artwork prepared for newspapers and some other print media had been long in preparation and it was too late to withdraw it. Funt relented but insisted that what could be changed would have to be. Newsweek ran a squib on the controversy.

=== Broadway, film, and more ===
Liza Minnelli, Minnelli on Minnelli, 1999

Hirschfeld started young and continued drawing to the end of his life, thus chronicling nearly all of the major entertainment figures of the 20th century. During his eight-decade career, he gained fame by illustrating the actors, singers, and dancers of various Broadway plays, which would appear in advance in The New York Times to herald the play's opening. Though the theater was his best-known field of interest, according to Hirschfeld's art dealer Margo Feiden, he actually drew more for the movies than he did for live plays. "By the ripe old age of 17, while his contemporaries were learning how to sharpen pencils, Hirschfeld became an art director at Selznick Pictures. He held the position for about four years, and then in 1924 Hirschfeld moved to Paris to work and lead a Bohemian life. He grew a beard, necessitated by the exigencies of living in a cold water flat which he retained for 75 years, presumably because 'you never know when your oil burner will go on the fritz.'"

In addition to Broadway and film, Hirschfeld also drew politicians, TV stars, and celebrities of all stripes, from Cole Porter and the Nicholas Brothers to the cast of Star Trek: The Next Generation. He caricatured jazz musicians including Glenn Miller, Benny Goodman, Artie Shaw, Tommy Dorsey, Fats Waller, Lionel Hampton, Harry James, Louis Armstrong, Duke Ellington, Count Basie, Dizzy Gillespie, Billie Holiday, and Ella Fitzgerald; country group The Oak Ridge Boys; and rockers The Beatles, Elvis Presley, Bruce Springsteen, Bob Dylan, Jerry Garcia, and Mick Jagger. In 1977, he drew the cover of Aerosmith's Draw the Line album.

Hirschfeld drew original posters for Charlie Chaplin's films as well as for The Wizard of Oz (1939) and many other original movie posters. The Rhapsody in Blue segment in the Disney movie Fantasia 2000 was inspired by his designs, and Hirschfeld became an artistic consultant for the segment. The segment's director, Eric Goldberg, is a longtime fan of his work. Further evidence of Goldberg's admiration for Hirschfeld can be found in Goldberg's character design and animation of the genie in Aladdin (1992). Hirschfeld was the subject of the Oscar-nominated documentary film The Line King: The Al Hirschfeld Story (1996).

=== Nina ===
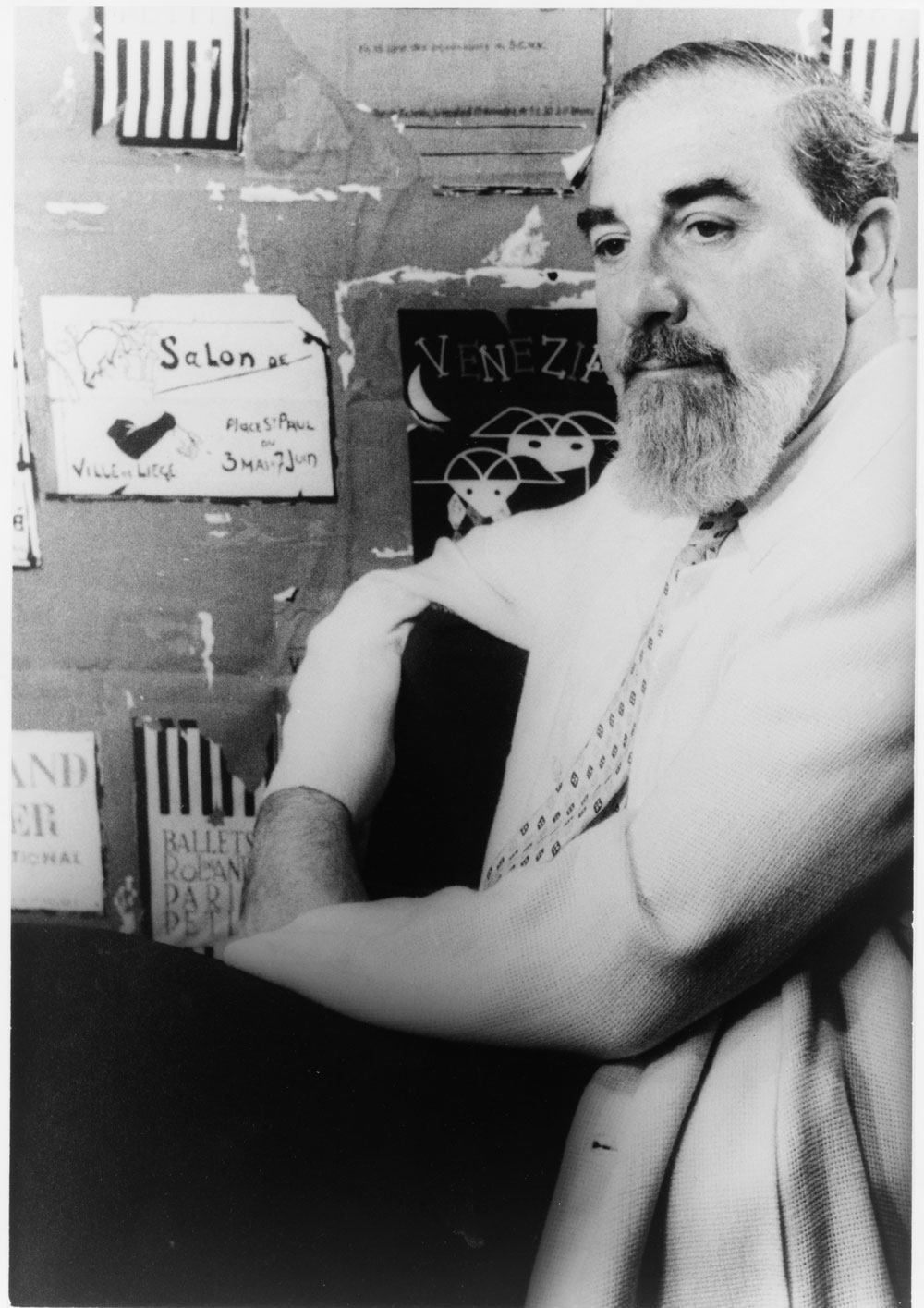
Hirschfeld in June 1955, by Carl Van Vechten

In 1943, Hirschfeld married German actress Dolly Haas. They were married for more than 50 years and had a daughter, Nina. Hirschfeld is known for hiding Nina's name, written in capital letters ("NINA"), in most of the drawings he produced after her birth. For example, the name appears in a sleeve, in a hairdo, or somewhere in the background. As Margo Feiden said, Hirschfeld engaged in the "harmless insanity", as he called it, of hiding her name at least once in each of his drawings. (Note: This practice has given rise to the term "nina", used by crossword puzzle writers and fans to refer to "a hidden message revealed in the completed grid of a crossword".) The number of "NINA"s concealed is shown by the number written to the right of his signature. Generally, if no number is to be found, either "NINA" appears once or the drawing was completed before she was born.

For a few months after Nina's birth, Hirschfeld intended the hidden "NINA"s to appeal to his circle of friends. But what he had not realized was that the population at large was beginning to spot them, too. When Hirschfeld thought that the gag was wearing thin among his friends and stopped concealing "NINA"s in his drawings, letters to The New York Times ranging from "curious" to "furious" pressured him to begin hiding them again. He said it was easier to hide the "NINA"s than it was to answer all the mail. From time to time he lamented that the gimmick had overshadowed his art.

In Hirschfeld's book Show Business Is No Business, Feiden recounts this story to illustrate what Hirschfeld meant when he referred to the "NINA" counting as a harmless insanity: "The 'NINA'-counting mania was well illuminated when in 1973 an NYU student kept coming back to my Gallery to stare at the same drawing each day for more than a week. The drawing was Hirschfeld's whimsical portrayal of New York's Central Park. When curiosity finally got the best of me, I asked, 'What is so riveting about that one drawing that keeps you here for hours, day after day?' She answered that she had found only 11 of 39 "NINA"s and would not give up until all were located. I replied that the '39' next to Hirschfeld's signature was the year. Nina was born in 1945."

In his 1966 anthology The World of Hirschfeld, he included a drawing of Nina that he titled "Nina's Revenge". The drawing contained no "NINA"s. There were, however, two "AL"s and two "DOLLY"s ("the names of her wayward parents"). In the Fantasia 2000 segment, the crimp of Duke the Builder's toothpaste tube contained a "NINA" in tribute to Hirschfeld.

=== Publications ===
The American Mercury with Al Hirschfeld's caricature of Ernest Hemingway

Al Hirschfeld famously contributed to The New York Times for more than seven decades. His work also appeared in The New York Herald Tribune, The Old World, The New Yorker, Collier's, The American Mercury, TV Guide, Playbill, New York magazine, and Rolling Stone. In 1941, Hyperion Books published Harlem as Seen by Hirschfeld, with text by William Saroyan.

Hirschfeld's illustrations for the theater were gathered and published yearly in the books, The Best Plays of ... (for example, The Best Plays of 1958–1959). Additional collections of Hirschfeld's illustrations include Manhattan Oasis, Show Business Is No Business (1951), American Theater, The American Theater as Seen by Al Hirschfeld, The World of Al Hirschfeld (1970), The Lively Years, 1920–1973 with text by Brooks Atkinson (1973), The Entertainers (1977), Hirschfeld by Hirschfeld (1979), Hirschfeld’s World (1981), Show Business is No Business with preface and endnotes by Margo Feiden (1983), A Selection of Limited Edition Etchings and Lithographs with text by Margo Feiden (1983), Art and Recollections From Eight Decades (1991), Hirschfeld On Line (2000), Hirschfeld’s Hollywood (2001), Hirschfeld’s New York (2001), Hirschfeld’s Speakeasies of 1932 with introduction by Pete Hamill (2003), and Hirschfeld’s British Isles (2005).

Hirschfeld collaborated with humorist S. J. Perelman on several publications including Westward Ha! Or, Around the World in 80 Clichés, a satirical look at the duo's travels on assignment for Holiday. In 1987, the United States Postal Service commissioned him to draw a series of postage stamps commemorating famous American comedians. The 1991 collection included drawings of Stan Laurel, Oliver Hardy, Edgar Bergen (with Charlie McCarthy), Jack Benny, Fanny Brice, Bud Abbott, and Lou Costello. Next was a collection of drawings of silent film stars including Rudolph Valentino, ZaSu Pitts, and Buster Keaton. The Postal Service allowed him to include Nina's name in his drawings, waiving its own rule forbidding hidden messages in U.S. stamp designs. Hirschfeld expanded his audience by contributing to Patrick F. McManus's humor column in Outdoor Life for a number of years.

=== Collections and tributes ===
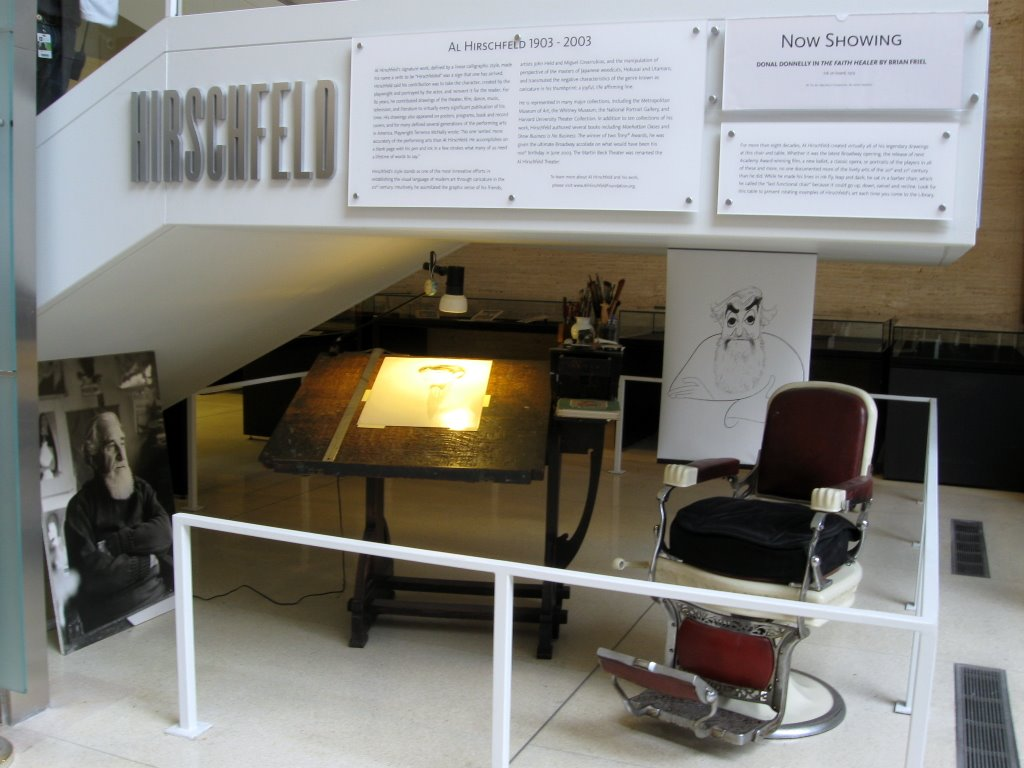
Al Hirschfeld's desk and chair in the lobby of the New York Public Library for the Performing Arts on the Upper West Side of Manhattan

Permanent collections of Hirschfeld's work can be found in a variety of institutions including the Metropolitan Museum of Art, the Museum of Modern Art, and the New York Public Library, in New York; Harvard University in Cambridge, Massachusetts; and the Harry Ransom Center in Austin, Texas.

Hirschfeld was the recipient of two lifetime achievement Tony Awards. On June 21, 2003, the Martin Beck Theatre on Broadway was renamed the Al Hirschfeld Theatre. He was also honored with a star on the St. Louis Walk of Fame.

In 2002, Hirschfeld was awarded the National Medal of Arts. He was an Honorary Member of the Salmagundi Club in Manhattan. In 2012, he was added to the Jewish-American Hall of Fame.

== Personal life and death ==
Hirschfeld married chorus girl Florence Ruth Hobby in 1927; the couple separated in 1932 and divorced in 1943, the year he and Dolly Haas were married. Haas died in 1994, aged 84. They had a daughter, Nina.

In 1996, he and Louise Kerz, a theatre historian (b. 1936), married. On January 20, 2003, Hirschfeld died of natural causes in his home at 122 East 95th Street in Carnegie Hill, Manhattan at the age of 99. He was survived by Kerz and Nina.

== See also ==
- List of caricaturists
- List of TV Guide covers
