= Dolly Gets Ahead =

1930 film

- Directed by: Anatole Litvak
- Written by: Alfred Halm; Peter Heimann; Irma von Cube
- Produced by: Noë Bloch; Arnold Pressburger; Gregor Rabinovitch
- Starring: Dolly Haas; Oskar Karlweis; Grete Natzler
- Cinematography: Robert Baberske; Fritz Arno Wagner
- Music by: Rudolf Nelson; Willy Schmidt-Gentner; Alfred Strasser
- Production company: UFA
- Distributed by: UFA
- Release date: 30 September 1930
- Running time: 87 minutes
- Country: Germany
- Language: German

Dolly Gets Ahead (German: Dolly macht Karriere) is a 1930 German musical film directed by Anatole Litvak and starring Dolly Haas, Oskar Karlweis, and Grete Natzler. It was shot at the Babelsberg Studios in Berlin. The film's sets were designed by the art directors Heinz Fenschel and Jacek Rotmil.

== Plot ==
Boyish Dolly Klaren, who makes a living as a hat shop clerk, is an energetic tomboy. She would like to live out her full power as an artist and dreams of an acting career in the theater. She is close friends with the equally talented and unsuccessful musician Fred, who only laughs at Dolly when she tells him about her stage plans. With a trick, she can visit the local theater director Silbermann, who is in dire need: the leading role in a play has to be filled again because the previous star has ignominiously let him down. Silbermann, a compact, always a bit hectic and spirited theater man through and through, knows how PR works. Since he recognizes talent in Dolly, he vigorously beats the publicity drum and praises the completely unknown performer to the public.

In order to make the delicate girl a little more interesting for the audience, Silbermann also started the rumor that Dolly was the mistress of the noble Duke Eberhard von Schwarzenburg. Of course, this comes as complete news to the duke who now begins to develop an interest in the young girl. For this reason he attends the first performance of the new revue with Dolly, which turns out to be quite a failure for the debutante. The nobleman takes care of Dolly and tries to comfort her as much as possible. The man "in his prime" quickly falls in love with the girl, but has to rethink his attitude when he overhears a conversation about Dolly's (supposedly platonic) friend Fred. The duke withdraws in his calm, elegant manner. After various misunderstandings, Dolly and Fred come together as a couple. Dolly succeeds in turning Fred, an unsuccessful clarinettist, into a sought-after composer who is soon able to land his first big hit.

== Cast ==
- Dolly Haas as Dolly Klaren
- Oskar Karlweis as Fred Halton
- Grete Natzler as Mariette
- Vicky Werckmeister as Orelly
- Alfred Abel as Count Eberhard
- Hermann Blaß as O.W. Pietsch
- Kurt Gerron as Silbermann
- Paul Kemp as Jack
- Theo Lingen as Conny Coon
- Gustl Gstettenbaur as Boy
- Hansi Arnstaedt
- Lucie Euler
- Trude Lehmann
- Valeska Stock
- Ellen Plessow
- Paul Henckels
- Erich Kestin
- Geza L. Weiss
- Manfred Voss
- Bernhardt Veidt
- Charly Dodo
- Georg Schmieter
- Kurt Lilien
- Julius E. Herrmann
- Hans Zesch-Ballot

== Bibliography ==
- Bock, Hans-Michael; Bergfelder, Tim, eds. (2009). The Concise Cinegraph: Encyclopaedia of German Cinema. New York: Berghahn Books. ISBN 978-1-57181-655-9.
