= Rose Stradner =

Austrian actress (1913–1958)

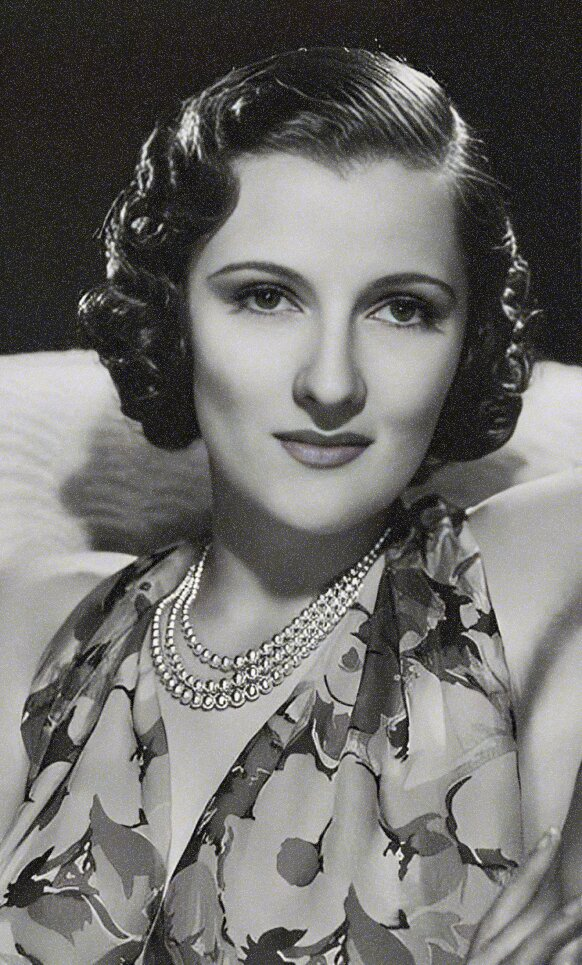
- Stradner in 1937
- Born: Rosa Stradner; July 31, 1913; Vienna, Austria-Hungary
- Died: September 27, 1958 (aged 45); Mount Kisco, New York, U.S.
- Occupation: Actress
- Years active: 1933–1953
- Spouse(s): Karlheinz Martin (m. 1934; div. 1938) Joseph L. Mankiewicz (m. 1939)
- Children: Christopher Mankiewicz; Tom Mankiewicz

Rose Luise Maria Stradner (Note: Also known and credited as Rosa Stradner) (July 31, 1913 – September 27, 1958) was an Austrian-born stage and film actress. Her notable films include The Last Gangster (1937), in which she co-starred opposite Edward G. Robinson and James Stewart, and The Keys of the Kingdom (1944) with Gregory Peck. She was the second wife of film director Joseph L. Mankiewicz.

== Early years ==
Rosa Stradner was born on July 31, 1913 in Vienna, Austria-Hungary. While still an infant, she moved with her parents to Trieste and Isonzo, where her father was stationed as an engineer in charge of troop transportation during World War I. After the war, Stradner was educated at the Sacred Heart Academy in Vienna, where she wrote, directed and performed in student plays.

== Career ==
On her 19th birthday, Stradner approached Austrian theatrical producer and film director Max Reinhardt directly, and asked him for an acting job. She auditioned and under Reinhardt's tutelage, acted in over 50 theatrical productions, including plays written by William Shakespeare, Molière, Henrik Ibsen, Oscar Wilde, and George Bernard Shaw. According to one newspaper, Italian Prime Minister Benito Mussolini was so captivated by Stradner that he saw one of her plays three times and gave her a bouquet.

By 1933, Stradner began acting in several German-language films. At the Berlin premiere of one of her films, Joseph Goebbels offered her a 15-year contract to appear in Nazi Germany propaganda films. Stradner declined the offer, stating she would continue acting in Austrian films. Goebbels replied: "In that case, you'll be working for us eventually. It's only a matter of time." A year later, Stradner performed at the Volksbühne theatre, where she was directed by Karlheinz Martin, whom she married. She also appeared at the Volkstheater, Vienna, where Luise Rainer was her understudy.

During a talent search, László Willinger's photographs of Stradner caught the attention of Metro-Goldwyn-Mayer (MGM) while she was performing in a stage adaptation of Arthur Schnitzler's Fräulein Else. One studio publicity story circulated that Stradner was discovered by Louis B. Mayer and Benjamin Thau while in Europe. She was then imported into the United States on the same ship with director Victor Saville, actresses Hedy Lamarr and Ilona Massey, singer Miliza Korjus, and screenwriter Walter Reisch. However, her son Tom stated she and her mother Luise had fled the Nazis during the mid-1930s.

In 1937, Stradner was placed under contract to MGM where studio publicists considered renaming her Andrea Marlow or Andra Marlo. However, they simply substituted her first name for Rose. She made her Hollywood film debut opposite Edward G. Robinson and James Stewart in The Last Gangster (1937), where she played the wife of Robinson's character, Joe Krozac. A review in Variety praised her performance, writing Stradner "is a natural as the gangster's wife, the accent fitting in perfectly. As an actress, her talents lie on the dramatic side; she's attractive enough to win attention, too." The Washington Evening Star placed a byline underneath her image stating: "Rose Stradner is being hailed by the M-G-M people as the studio's greatest discovery since Garbo, as they seem to feel she is going places in the cinema." Despite her positive notices, Stradner was not cast in another film with MGM.

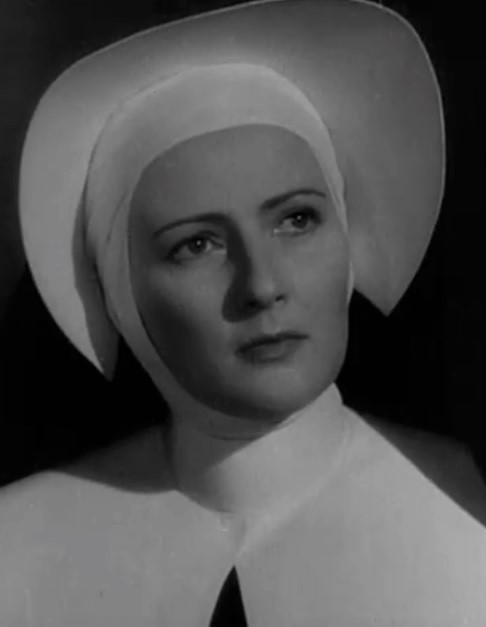
Rose Stradner in The Keys of the Kingdom

In 1938, MGM loaned Stradner to RKO Pictures for The Saint in New York but she was replaced. A year later, Stradner signed a long-term contract with Columbia Pictures. There, she appeared in Blind Alley (1939), in which she played Ralph Bellamy's wife. Despondent over her career trajectory, Stradner threatened suicide and was violently anxious at her second husband Joseph L. Mankiewicz. He cabled talent agent Leland Hayward for assistance when Stradner was being considered for a New York production of Lorelei but she did not get the role.

Months after she gave birth to her second son, in October 1942, Stradner fell into a catatonic state while vacationing with her husband and Alice and Franz Waxman at the Arrowhead Springs Hotel. She was returned home, and Mankiewicz entered her into the Menninger Clinic in Topeka, Kansas. She spent nine months at the clinic under the care of Karl Menninger, who prescribed her medication to treat her illness.

Stradner's final film was The Keys of the Kingdom (1944), in which she portrayed Reverend Mother Maria-Veronica. The role had been intended for Ingrid Bergman because of her box office appeal as Gregory Peck was then an unknown actor. However, Bergman was unavailable at the time, and Stradner auditioned for the role without her husband's knowledge. After some time, Bergman became available and Darryl F. Zanuck instead offered Stradner a two-picture contract with Twentieth Century-Fox. Stradner declined and pushed Mankiewicz to have her retain the role. Mankiewicz pleaded with Zanuck to have Stradner in the role to save his already-troubled marriage, and Zanuck agreed. By January 1945, Stradner's performance in The Keys of the Kingdom was well-received by film critics that her management took a full-page Variety advertisement with all of her positive reviews. Among them was Time magazine who stated Stradner's performance was "disciplined, powerful".

Twentieth Century-Fox wanted to place Stradner under contract, and she was considered for roles in Anna and the King of Siam (1946), Forever Amber (1947), and Daisy Kenyon (1947). In January 1946, the Los Angeles Times reported that Stradner had "decided in favor of pictures" and was negotiating a contract with Twentieth Century-Fox. When the contract was not reached, by August 1946, Stradner and Mankiewicz were reported to be in New York "shopping for a play to do on Broadway."

Offscreen, Stradner and her husband regularly hosted dinner parties at their Beverly Hills residence. Her son Christopher remembered instances where "my mother would hit the martinis and there would be a big scene." It is believed the scene in All About Eve (1950) in which an intoxicated Margo Channing states, "Fasten your seat belts, it's going to be a bumpy night" was partially inspired by Stradner. Her other son Tom remembered she suffered from "a mental condition, a form of schizophrenia usually triggered by alcohol", which "made her absolutely terrifying at times." Despite her illness, Tom wrote his mother was fluent in several languages, especially English and Italian, and provided feedback on his father's scripts. When the script for All About Eve was published in hardcover, Joseph wrote a dedication inside the publication: "To Rosa—the critic on my hearth" (a pun of "cricket on the hearth".)

In 1948, Stradner made her American stage debut in the play Bravo! written by Edna Ferber, produced by Max Gordon, and directed by George S. Kaufman. Costarring opposite Oscar Homolka, the play centered on a refugee European playwright (patterned after Ferenc Molnár) and his mistress, an aging European star, who reside in a shabby boarding house with other destitute refugees. She had auditioned for the role of Rosa Rucker, whereby Ferber and Kaufman were left impressed that they applauded.

The play previewed in October at the Wilbur Theatre, where theatre critic Cyrus Durgin called Bravo! "a disappointing play, but with some good acting." A month later, it was staged at the Lyceum Theatre. However, despite positive reviews of her performance, Stradner was replaced by Lili Darvas, who was married to Molnár. Columnist Louella Parsons wrote that Stradner was replaced because she was "too young and good looking for the part." In November 1948, Bravo! closed on Broadway after a run of 44 performances. Mankiewicz reflected decades later, "I don't think she ever recovered from that. She was just on her way back up and that really was a tremendous blow to her..."

Stradner's last onscreen appearance was the 1953 TV episode "Reign of Terror" from Suspense.

== Personal life and death ==
In 1934, Stradner married German stage and film director Karlheinz Martin, who was 27 years her senior. When MGM placed her on contract, Stradner's marriage and past film career was expunged from the public. She later returned to Europe and divorced Martin.

At MGM, Stradner met Joseph L. Mankiewicz, who was instructed to help improve her English as he had with other German-speaking actresses. The two were married on July 28, 1939, at Mankiewicz's sister's apartment in New York. When they returned to Los Angeles, on Stradner's 26th birthday, MGM studio writers and producers greeted them at the railway station with rice and a ten-piece orchestra. Stradner gave birth to two sons, Christopher, born in 1940, and Tom Mankiewicz, born in 1942. In November 1944, the Los Angeles Times reported that she and her husband had mutually agreed to separate, though it was short-lived.

Stradner, at the age of 40, underwent a hysterectomy while her husband was filming The Barefoot Contessa (1954) in Rome. Her emotional breakdowns has been speculated due to her own fear of aging and losing her sexual attractiveness, which was made worse by her husband's extramarital affairs. Fred Hacker, a psychiatrist Stradner had known since her stay at Menninger's, stated: "Joe was advised many times to separate or get a divorce. He always promised that he would at some future date, that he would only remain until a particular crisis was over. So it was always clear the attraction she held for him, although I'm sure that he was not entirely faithful during those periods."

Throughout their marriage, Stradner was often hospitalized for extended periods. Long suspicious of her husband's serial philandering, Stradner confronted Joseph with an allegation he was having an extramarital affair with Rosemary Matthews, a production staff member, while he was filming The Quiet American (1958) in Saigon. Stradner suffered a mental breakdown, in which Joseph contacted his sister Erna to accompany Stradner and have her hospitalized in a Viennese clinic. There, Stradner was treated by Fred Hacker. In July 1957, she flew back in the United States to finish her recuperation in a Connecticut clinic as advised by Lawrence Kubie. Stradner suffered another manic episode, and Kubie sent her to the Neurological Institute of New York.

On the night of September 26, 1958, at their summer home in Mount Kisco, New York, she and Joseph fought, and he left for New York City to work on his Broadway play. Hours later, he contacted his niece Josie after Stradner had not been answering the phone. On September 27, Stradner was found dead lying on the floor near a writing desk, at the age of 45. She was found holding a "nearly indecipherable note" in her hand, stating she was "tired". Her death was ruled a suicide through an overdose of sedatives. She was interred at the Kensico Cemetery in Valhalla.

== Filmography ==
Year	Title	Role	Notes	Ref.
1933	A Certain Mr. Gran	Bianca, seine Frau	German: Ein gewisser Herr Gran	
1933	Wedding at Lake Wolfgang	Rosl	German: Hochzeit am Wolfgangsee	
1934	So Ended a Great Love	Kaiserin Maria Ludovica	German: So endete eine Liebe	
1935	Hundred Days	Maria Luisa von Österreich	German: Hundret Tage	
1935	A Night of Change	Maria, seine Frau	German: Nacht der Verwandlung	
1935	The Man with the Paw	Lena Kröning	German: Der Mann mit der Pranke	
1936	The Postman from Longjumeau	Madelaine	German: Der König lächelt - Paris lacht	
1936	Dinner Is Served	Mary, Potters Tochter	German: Diener lassen bitten	
1936	City of Anatol	Sonja Yvolandi	German: Stadt Anatol	
1936	The Last Gangster	Tayla Krozac	First American film	
1939	Blind Alley	Doris Shelby		
1944	The Keys of the Kingdom	Reverend Mother Maria-Veronica		

== Sources and notes ==
Notes

== Bibliography ==
- Davis, Nick (2021). Competing with Idiots: Herman and Joe Mankiewicz, a Dual Portrait. New York: Knopf Doubleday. ISBN 978-1-400-04183-1.
- Geist, Kenneth L. (1978). Pictures Will Talk: The Life and Films of Joseph L. Mankiewicz. New York: Scribners. ISBN 0-684-15500-1.
- Lower, Cheryl Bray; Palmer, R. Barton (2001). Joseph L. Mankiewicz: Critical Essays with an Annotated Bibliography and a Filmography. McFarland. ISBN 978-0-7864-0987-7.
- Mankiewicz, Tom; Crane, Robert (2012). My Life as a Mankiewicz: An Insider's Journey through Hollywood. Lexington: University Press of Kentucky. ISBN 978-0-8131-3605-9.
- Stern, Sydney Ladensohn (2019). The Brothers Mankiewicz: Hope, Heartbreak, and Hollywood Classics. University Press of Mississippi. ISBN 978-1-617-03267-7.
- Wagner, Laura (2020). "Rose Stradner". Hollywood's Hard-Luck Ladies: 23 Actresses Who Suffered Early Deaths, Accidents, Missteps, Illnesses and Tragedies. McFarland & Company. pp. 159–167. ISBN 978-1-476-63833-1.
