= Two Good Comrades =

1933 film directed by Max Obal

- Directed by: Max Obal
- Written by: Bobby E. Lüthge
- Produced by: Gabriel Levy
- Starring: Paul Hörbiger; Fritz Kampers; Jessie Vihrog
- Cinematography: Guido Seeber
- Edited by: Else Baum
- Music by: Rolf Marbot; Bert Margulies; Bert Reisfeld; Werner Schmidt-Boelcke
- Production company: Aafa-Film
- Distributed by: Aafa-Film
- Release date: 17 February 1933
- Running time: 88 minutes
- Country: Germany
- Language: German

Two Good Comrades (German: Zwei gute Kameraden) is a 1933 German war comedy film directed by Max Obal and starring Paul Hörbiger, Fritz Kampers, and Jessie Vihrog.

The film's art direction was by Robert A. Dietrich and Bruno Lutz.

== Cast ==
- Paul Hörbiger as Fritz Lehmann
- Fritz Kampers as Paul Hanke
- Jessie Vihrog as Jeanette
- Margot Landa as Paula
- Hans Hermann Schaufuß as Emanuel Nagel, Theaterdiretor
- Senta Söneland as Emme, dessen Frau
- Albert Paulig as Ein Hauptmann
- Rudolf Platte
- Erich Kestin
- Hansi Arnstaedt as Jeanettes Tante
- Hugo Fischer-Köppe as Ein Gendarm
- Friedrich Ettel
- Ernst Behmer
- Gustav Püttjer
- Arthur Reppert
- Kitty Meinhardt
- Oskar Höcker
- Leopold Kramer
- Horsten
- Theodor Thony

== Bibliography ==
- Bock, Hans-Michael; Bergfelder, Tim, eds. (2009). The Concise Cinegraph: Encyclopaedia of German Cinema. New York: Berghahn Books. ISBN 978-1-57181-655-9.
