= Das häßliche Mädchen =

1933 film

- Directed by: Hermann Kosterlitz (Henry Koster) (uncredited)
- Screenplay by: Felix Joachimson (Felix Jackson); Hermann Kosterlitz (uncredited)
- Starring: Dolly Haas; Max Hansen; Otto Wallburg
- Production company: Avanti-Tonfilm GmbH
- Release date: September 8, 1933 (Berlin)
- Running time: 74 minutes
- Country: Nazi Germany
- Language: German

Das häßliche Mädchen ("The Ugly Girl", sometimes translated as "The Ugly Duckling") is a German comedy film made in early 1933, during the transition from the Weimar Republic to Nazi Germany, and premièred in September that year. It was the first or second film directed by Hermann Kosterlitz, who left Germany before the film was completed and later worked in the United States under the name Henry Koster, and the last German film in which Dolly Haas appeared; she also later emigrated to the US. A Nazi-led riot broke out at the première to protest the male lead, Max Hansen, who was supposedly "too Jewish." The film's representation of the "ugly girl" as an outsider has been described as a metaphorical way to explore the outsider existence of Jews.

== Background and reception ==
Das häßliche Mädchen was filmed at the Avanti Tonfilm studios in Grunewald, Berlin in January–February 1933, the first months of Hitler's term as Reich Chancellor. Between filming and the 8 September première at the Atrium-Theater, the Nazis had begun to define and institute their official policies of anti-Semitism targeting the cinema industry. In March, the Propaganda Ministry had been created and Goebbels had declared that German cinema must become a völkisch art form. In June, the Film Credit Bank had been founded to control the staffing and casting of films through their funding and the Aryan clause had forbidden non-Germans and non-"Aryans", with few exceptions, from participating in the production or distribution of German films. In mid-July, the Reich Film Chamber had been formed, with membership required for continued employment in cinema.

Hermann Kosterlitz both directed and co-wrote the script. This was his first or second time directing. Kosterlitz, who was Jewish, had left Germany months before the première, without seeing the final cut. His name was removed from the credits and replaced by an "Aryan" pseudonym, "Hasse Preis". He went to Paris in April, then via Budapest and Vienna to Hollywood in 1936. (The other author, Felix Joachimson, would go first to Austria and then also to the US, where he was a successful scriptwriter and producer under the name of Felix Jackson.)

The male lead, Max Hansen, was reputed to be part-Jewish and the previous year had performed a comic song implying that Hitler was homosexual; at the opening, in a riot orchestrated by the Nazis, members of the audience attacked him as "too Jewish", shouting "We want German movies! We want German actors!", and he was pelted with tomatoes. Rotten eggs were thrown at the screen. In the words of the review in Film-Kurier:

[W]histling was heard from various sides. The applause stopped. The whistling continued. The curtain remained closed because rotten eggs were thrown at the stage. Someone called from the balcony: "We want German movies! We want German actors! We do not need Jewish actors, we have enough German actors! Aren't you ashamed, German women, to applaud Jewish actors? Oust the Jew Max Hansen, who only six months ago sang a couplet about 'Hitler and Little Cohn' in a cabaret!"

Hansen also soon left Germany, for Vienna and then Denmark.

Dolly Haas was an exclusively comedic actress with an androgynous persona well suited to a film about appearance and the performance of identity; there were rumours about her racial heritage, too, but they were squashed with statements that she came "from a good Aryan family". Upset by the treatment of her co-star, she accepted an invitation to work in England in 1934 and left Germany for good in 1936.

The film did receive praise for its humour, and reviews included phrases such as "pleasant", "amusing" and "full of delightful ideas". The Film-Kurier review noted that there was applause when the film ended, and an ovation for Haas, before she brought out Hansen. During this transitional year, Nazi control over the film industry had yet to be consolidated and practices and attitudes varied. Otto Wallburg was Jewish and was to die in Auschwitz, but continued to work in films in Germany until 1936 under the exemption for veterans of the First World War; in this film, his role was simply characterised in the press as a typical sex- and money-obsessed member of the Berlin nouveau riche.

== Plot summary ==
Lotte März (Dolly Haas) is hired as a secretary at an insurance company because she is ugly; introducing her to the (male) accountants, the personnel manager says, "I hope that you will finally be able to work in peace." The men harass her and conspire to lure her into a compromising position by having one of them, Fritz Mahldorf (Max Hansen) pretend to find her attractive. The manager discovers her in an embrace with Fritz and fires her. The self-absorbed Fritz, showing remorse that is unusual for him, arranges for her to be rehired as assistant to Director Mönckeberg (Otto Wallburg, a comical figure). Lotte has fallen for him, but he makes a date at his flat with the Director's girlfriend, Lydia (Genia Nikolaieva). Soon after she arrives, so does Lotte, and then so does the jealous Director. Farcical misunderstandings ensue, including the discovery of Lydia's fur coat and a fancy-dress ball at the Director's villa in which Lotte dresses as a pirate (just like the Director). Lotte undergoes a complete makeover at a beauty parlour: haircut, perm, and facial—and is transformed into an attractive flapper. (As The New York Times reviewer put it, "As always, however, the ugly duckling becomes a disturbingly graceful swan.") Fritz falls in love with her and love triumphs, although he remains a flatterer and a deceiver and she has contemplated suicide.

== Critical theories ==
The film has been seen as a treatment of the exclusion of Jews through the metaphor of the familiar trope of sexism and the need for women to self-present as acceptably feminine. Lotte's initial ugliness translates as "she looks too Jewish." Early in the film, she protests, "But I haven't done anything to you!", which applies also to the situation of the Jews. Hansen, the presumed Jew with characteristically "Jewish" features, playing Fritz, the tormentor with the stereotypically German name, and Haas, the blonde and childish-looking Lotte being excoriated as "ugly" (i.e. Jewish) effect a displacement of the problem of otherness to enact a narrative of accommodation making use of the traditional romantic comedy plot of the girl getting a makeover to attract the boy.

== Unrealised Brecht project ==
Bertolt Brecht wanted to make a film of the same title featuring Valeska Gert, but this project never came to fruition.

== Sources ==
- Knud Wolffram. "'Wir wollen deutsche Schauspieler!' Der Fall Max Hansen". Filmexil 12 (2000) 47–59 (in German)
