= Things Are Getting Better Already =

1932 film

- Directed by: Kurt Gerron
- Written by: Peter Hell; Philipp Lothar Mayring; Jenõ Szatmári; Fritz Zeckendorf
- Starring: Dolly Haas; Heinz Rühmann; Paul Otto
- Cinematography: Robert Baberske; Fritz Arno Wagner
- Edited by: Constantin Mick
- Music by: Walter Jurmann; Bronislau Kaper
- Production company: UFA
- Distributed by: UFA
- Release date: 6 February 1932
- Running time: 67 minutes
- Country: Germany
- Language: German

Things Are Getting Better Already (German: Es wird schon wieder besser) is a 1932 German comedy film directed by Kurt Gerron and starring Dolly Haas, Heinz Rühmann and Paul Otto. It was shot at the Babelsberg Studios in Berlin. The film's sets were designed by the art director Julius von Borsody.

== Cast ==
- Dolly Haas as Edith
- Heinz Rühmann as Ingenieur Fred Holmer
- Paul Otto as Geheimrat Ringler
- Fritz Grünbaum as Justizrat Feldacker
- Oskar Sima as Sanitätsrat Dr. Hartmann
- Ernö Verebes as Willi Bertram
- Jessie Vihrog as Johanna Bertram
- Gerhard Bienert as Polizist
- Paul Westermeier as Gefängniswärter
- Hugo Flink
- Ferdinand von Alten
- Viktor Franz
- Günther Hadank
- Paul Henckels
- William Huch
- Fritz Odemar
- Werner Pledath
- Gustav Püttjer
- Oscar Sabo
- Hans Wassmann
- Gertrud Wolle
- Ernst Wurmser
- Martha Ziegler

== Bibliography ==
- Waldman, Harry. Nazi Films in America, 1933-1942. McFarland, 2008.
