= Kohlhiesel's Daughters (1943 film) =

- Directed by: Kurt Hoffmann
- Written by: Hanns Kräly (play); Georg Zoch
- Produced by: Herbert Engelsing
- Starring: Eduard Köck; Heli Finkenzeller; Oskar Sima
- Cinematography: Robert Baberske
- Edited by: Ilse Voigt
- Music by: Harald Böhmelt
- Production company: Tobis Film
- Distributed by: Deutsche Filmvertriebs
- Release date: 18 March 1943
- Running time: 90 minutes
- Country: Germany
- Language: German

Kohlhiesel's Daughters (German: Kohlhiesels Töchter) is a 1943 German comedy film directed by Kurt Hoffmann and starring Eduard Köck, Heli Finkenzeller and Oskar Sima. It is one of a number of film adaptations of Hanns Kräly's play of the same name.

The film's sets were designed by the art directors Franz Koehn and Willy Schiller. Location shooting took place at Lake Ossiach in Carinthia.

== Cast ==
- Eduard Köck as Mathias Kohlhöfer, genannt Kohlhiesel
- Heli Finkenzeller as Veronika Kohlhöfer
- Oskar Sima as Simon Moser, genannt Jodok-Simerl
- Erika von Thellmann as Mosers Wirtschafterin Theres
- Margarete Haagen as Kohlhiesels Wirtschafterin Sophie
- Leo Peukert as Gemeindevorsteher
- Sepp Rist as Kaspar Pointer
- Josef Eichheim as Thomas Altlechner
- Paul Richter as Bertl
- Klaus Pohl as Gemeindediener Paulus
- Fritz Kampers as Schmied Unterhuber
- Marta Salm as Franzi Unterhuber
- Beppo Brem as Florian

== Bibliography ==
- Ludewig, Alexandra. Screening Nostalgia: 100 Years of German Heimat Film. transcript Verlag, 2014.
