= Frisians in Peril =

- Directed by: Peter Hagen
- Written by: Werner Kortwich
- Produced by: Alfred Bittins; Hermann Schmidt
- Starring: Friedrich Kayßler; Jessie Vihrog; Valéry Inkijinoff
- Cinematography: Sepp Allgeier
- Edited by: Wolfgang Becker
- Music by: Walter Gronostay
- Production company: Delta-Film
- Release date: 19 November 1935
- Running time: 97 minutes
- Country: Germany
- Language: German

Frisians in Peril (German: Friesennot) is a 1935 German drama film directed by Peter Hagen and starring Friedrich Kayßler, Jessie Vihrog and Valéry Inkijinoff. Made for Nazi propaganda purposes, it concerns a village of ethnic Frisians in Russia.

It was shot at the Grunewald Studios in Berlin. The film's sets were designed by the art directors Robert A. Dietrich and Bernhard Schwidewski. Location shooting took place around the Lüneburg Heath near Bispingen. It premiered at the Ufa-Palast am Zoo in the German capital.

== Plot ==
Soviet authorities are making life as difficult as possible for a village of Volga Germans, most of whose ancestors originated in the Frisian Islands, with taxes and other oppression.

After Mette, a half-Russian, half-Frisian woman, becomes the girlfriend of Kommissar Tschernoff, the Frisians murder her and throw her body in a swamp.

Open violence breaks out and all of the Red Army soldiers stationed nearby are killed by the villagers. They then set fire to their village and flee.

== Cast ==
- Friedrich Kayßler as Jürgen Wagner
- Helene Fehdmer as Kathrin Wagner
- Valéry Inkijinoff as Kommissar Tschernoff
- Jessie Vihrog as Das Mädchen Mette
- Hermann Schomberg as Klaus Niegebüll
- Ilse Fürstenberg as Dörte Niegebüll
- Kai Möller as Hauke Peters
- Fritz Hoopts as Ontje Ibs
- Martha Ziegler as Wiebke Detlevsen
- Gertrud Boll as Telse Detlevsen
- Maria Koppenhöfer as Frau Winkler
- Marianne Simson as Hilde Winkler
- Franz Stein as Christian Kröger
- Aribert Grimmer as Kommissar Krappien

== Production ==
Willi Krause, under the name Peter Hagen, directed a film adapting the novel by Werner Kartwig.

== Release ==
The film was one of the few to be directly distributed by the Nazi Party. It was approved by the censors on 15 November 1935, and premiered in Berlin on 19 November. It was banned in 1939 shortly before the Molotov–Ribbentrop Pact due to its strong anti-Soviet message. It was unbanned after the German invasion of the Soviet Union in 1941, and re-released under the title Village in the Red Storm Dorf im roten Sturm.

== Motifs ==
A cynical piece of anti-Communist propaganda depicts the Communists as posting obscene anti-religious posters, and the Frisians as piously declaring that all authority comes from God.

The portrayal of Kommissar Tschernoff does not conform to the heavy-handed depiction of Communists as brutal and murderous in such films as Flüchtlinge; he is truly and passionately in love with Mette, and only in response her death does he unleash his soldiers. A villager objects to the affair on the grounds that even though her mother was Russian, her father's Frisian blood "outweighs" foreign blood, and therefore she must not throw herself at a foreigner. Her murder is presented as just retribution for her violation of the Nazi principle of "race defilement."

== Works cited ==
- Hull, David (1969). Film in the Third Reich: Art and Propaganda in Nazi Germany. Simon & Schuster. SBN 671214861.
- Leiser, Erwin (1974). Nazi Cinema. Macmillan Publishers. ISBN 0025702300.
- Welch, David (1983). Propaganda and the German Cinema: 1933-1945. I.B. Tauris. ISBN 9781860645204.
