= The Last Gangster =

1937 US crime drama film by Edward Ludwig

- 1937 theatrical poster
- Directed by: Edward Ludwig
- Written by: John Lee Mahin
- Story by: William A. Wellman; Robert Carson
- Produced by: Lou L. Ostrow
- Starring: Edward G. Robinson; James Stewart; Rose Stradner; Lionel Stander; Douglas Scott; John Carradine; Sidney Blackmer
- Cinematography: William H. Daniels
- Edited by: Ben Lewis
- Music by: Edward Ward
- Production company: Metro-Goldwyn-Mayer
- Distributed by: Loew's Inc.
- Release date: November 12, 1937
- Running time: 81 minutes
- Country: United States
- Language: English

The Last Gangster (also called Another Public Enemy) is a 1937 American crime drama film directed by Edward Ludwig and starring Edward G. Robinson and James Stewart. The supporting cast features Rose Stradner, Lionel Stander and John Carradine.

== Plot ==
In 1927 during prohibition, gangland kingpin Joe Krozac returns from Europe with a new wife, Talya, who is unaware of his criminal background. The Kile brothers have muscled in on his territory in his absence, so he orders their assassinations. Three are killed, but "Acey" Kile survives. Soon after, Talya becomes pregnant, much to Krozac's delight.

Krozac is sent to Alcatraz Federal Penitentiary for ten years for income tax evasion before their son is born. After Talya visits her husband with their child, reporter Paul North plays a dirty trick on her, putting a gun in the baby's hands for a photograph. When Talya goes to his newspaper to plead to be left alone, his editor refuses to do so, but Paul is so ashamed of himself, he quits his job and strikes up a relationship with Talya. She gets a divorce and marries Paul. They move away and change their names to start a new life.

When Krozac is released from prison, he is determined to take his son, now named Paul Jr., and punish his former wife. However, his old assistant, Curly, persuades him to take charge of his old gang first. It turns out to be a trap. Curly and the others only want to learn where Krozac hid his money before going to jail. When Krozac resists their torture, the gang kidnaps his son to apply pressure. Krozac gives in. The gang drives off with the loot (only to be killed by the police), leaving Krozac and his son on foot.

He is unable to convince the boy that he is his father, but they get along all right on the journey home. After the boy is reunited with his parents, Krozac has a change of heart and leaves without his son. However, Acey Kile is waiting for him. Acey taunts Krozac at gunpoint, saying he is going to tell the newspapers who the boy's father really is after he guns down Krozac. To stop that, Krozac rushes him and manages to kill Acey before dying.

== Cast ==
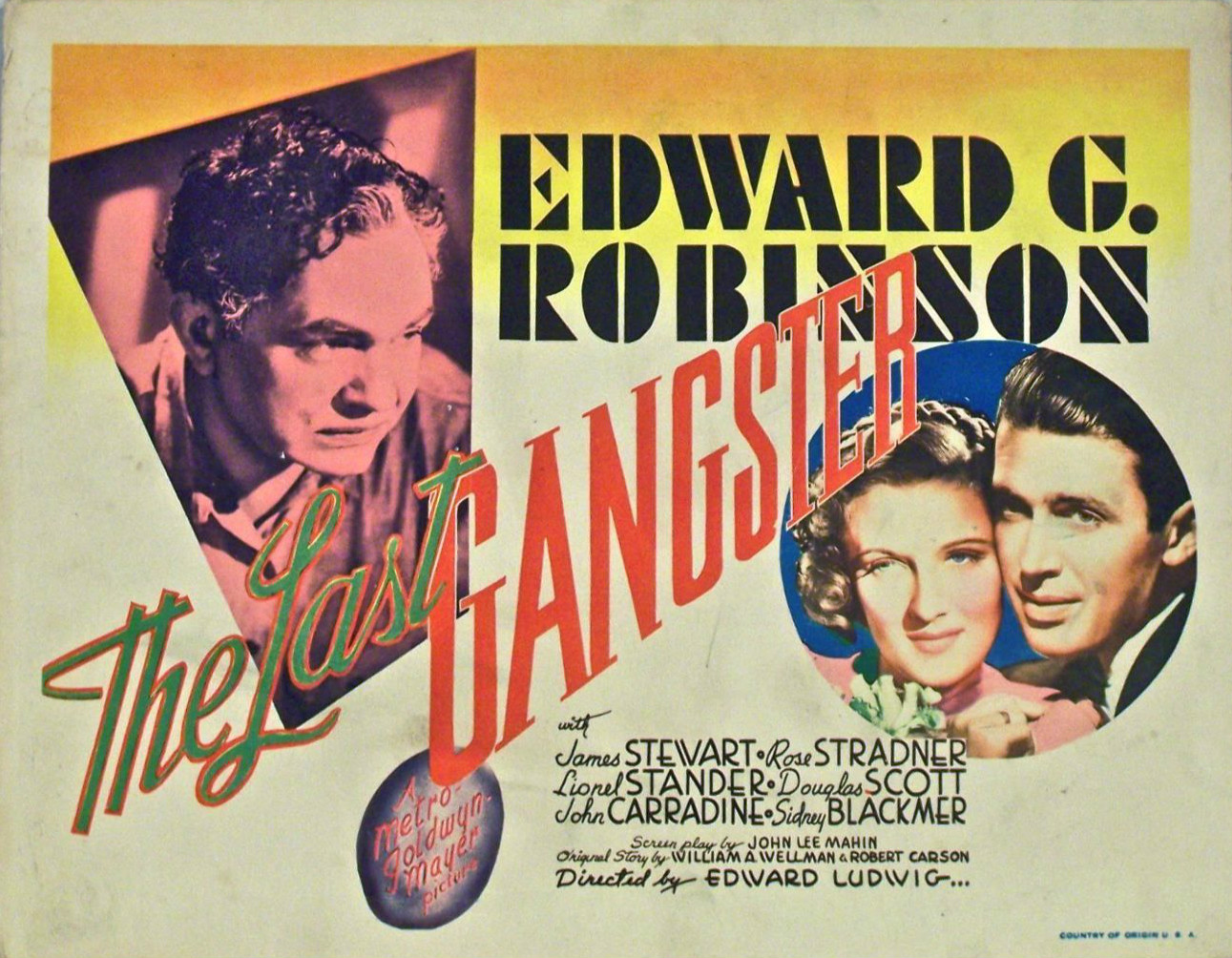
Lobby card

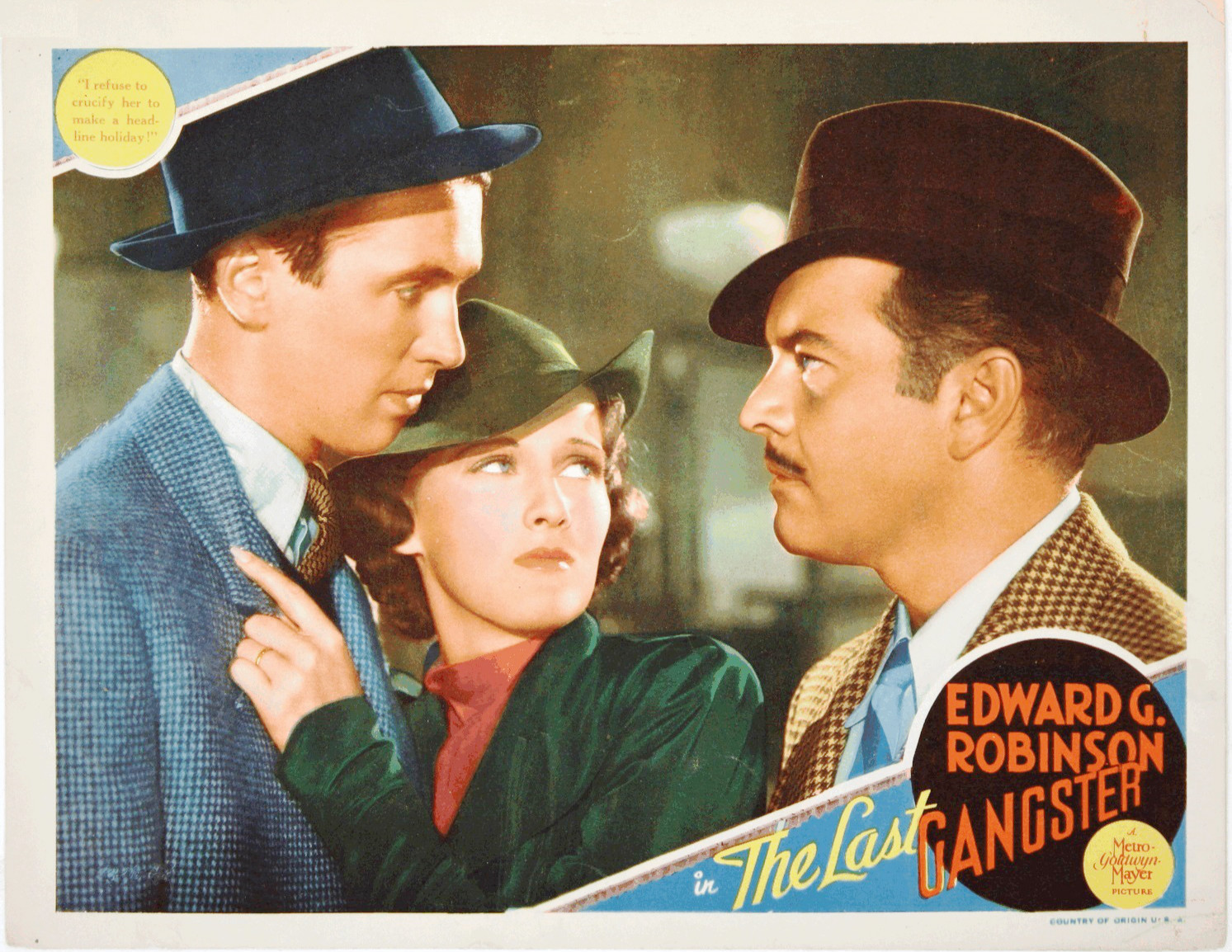
Lobby card

- Edward G. Robinson as Joe Krozac
- James Stewart as Paul North
- Rose Stradner as Talya Krozac
- Lionel Stander as "Curly"
- Douglas Scott as Paul North Jr./Joe Krozac Jr.
- John Carradine as Caspar, an inmate who tries to bully Krozac
- Sidney Blackmer as San Francisco editor
- Grant Mitchell as Warden
- Edward Brophy as "Fats" Garvey, a prisoner who supports Krozac
- Alan Baxter as Frankie "Acey" Kile
- Frank Conroy as Sid Gorman
- Louise Beavers as Gloria, Talya's servant

== Production ==
Despite the presence of Robinson and young Stewart, the picture fared poorly at the box office.

A protege of European director Max Reinhardt, Rose Stradner subsequently married writer/director Joseph L. Mankiewicz in 1939 and committed suicide in 1958 at age 45.

== Reception ==
Time Out Film Guide noted that Edward G. Robinson was his typically edgy character and that James Stewart looked much younger than his (then) 29 years, remarking that the film was "an absorbing exercise in contrasting styles".
