= You Don't Forget Such a Girl =

1932 film

- Directed by: Fritz Kortner
- Written by: Hans Wilhelm
- Starring: Willi Forst; Dolly Haas; Oskar Sima; Ida Wüst
- Cinematography: Robert Baberske
- Edited by: Carl Behr
- Music by: Ralph Erwin; Harald Böhmelt
- Production company: Projektograph Film
- Distributed by: DLS
- Release date: 20 January 1932
- Running time: 92 minutes
- Countries: Austria; Germany
- Language: German

You Don't Forget Such a Girl (German: So ein Mädel vergißt man nicht) is a 1932 Austrian-German romantic comedy film directed by Fritz Kortner and starring Willi Forst, Dolly Haas, and Oskar Sima. The film was shot at the Halensee Studios in Berlin. It was the last film made by Kortner before he went into exile following the Nazi takeover of 1933.

== Cast ==
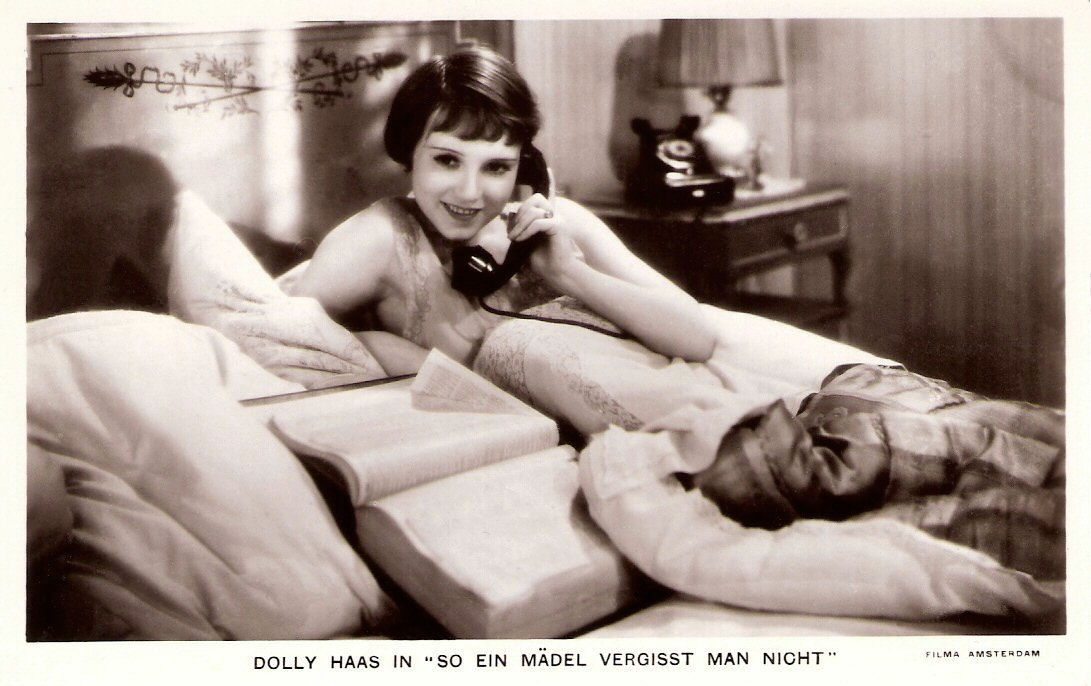
Promotional photo of Haas

- Willi Forst as Paul Hartwig
- Dolly Haas as Lisa Brandes
- Oskar Sima as Max Bach
- Max Gülstorff as Herr Körner
- Ida Wüst as Frau Körner
- Theo Lingen as Hahnen Jr.
- Paul Hörbiger as Direktor Leopold Schrader
- Julius Falkenstein as Dr. Berger
- Hans Hermann Schaufuß as Bornemann
- Hans Leibelt as Hahnen Sr.
- Hans Walden as Agenturdirektor
- Theodor Danegger as Hausportier
- Edwin Jürgensen as Ewald
- Valeska Stock as Angebe Nebenrolle

== Bibliography ==
- Hake, Sabine. Popular Cinema of the Third Reich. University of Texas Press, 2001.
