= Robert Baberske =

German cinematographer

- Born: 1 May 1900; Berlin, German Empire
- Died: 31 March 1958 (aged 57); East Berlin, East Germany
- Occupation: Cinematographer
- Years active: 1920 - 1957

Robert Baberske (1 May 1900 – 27 March 1958) was a German cinematographer. Although he worked briefly in Britain, Baberske spent most of his career in the German film industry. Baberske began as an assistant to Karl Freund. He became a prominent film technician during the silent era, and later during the Nazi years. Following the Second World War, he lived and worked in East Germany on a number of propaganda films for the state-controlled DEFA studio.

== Selected filmography ==
- Madame Wants No Children (1926)
- Berlin: Symphony of a Metropolis (1927)
- Doña Juana (1927)
- Out of the Mist (1927)
- A Knight in London (1929)
- Napoleon at St. Helena (1929)
- Bookkeeper Kremke (1930)
- Dolly Gets Ahead (1930)
- Calais-Dover (1931)
- Ronny (1931)
- No More Love (1931)
- The Street Song (1931)
- Thea Roland (1932)
- The Beautiful Adventure (1932)
- You Don't Forget Such a Girl (1932)
- The Song of Night (1932)
- Things Are Getting Better Already (1932)
- The Burning Secret (1933)
- One Night's Song (1933)
- Spies at Work (1933)
- Little Girl, Great Fortune (1933)
- The Sun Rises (1934)
- The Higher Command (1935)
- The Foolish Virgin (1935)
- One Too Many on Board (1935)
- Make Me Happy (1935)
- The Girl Irene (1936)
- Carousel (1937)
- The Chief Witness (1937)
- A Night in May (1938)
- What Now, Sibylle? (1938)
- The Girl of Last Night (1938)
- Her First Experience (1939)
- Man for Man (1939)
- How Do We Tell Our Children? (1940)
- Between Hamburg and Haiti (1940)
- The Rothschilds (1940)
- Attack on Baku (1942)
- The Old Boss (1942)
- Between Heaven and Earth (1942)
- Kohlhiesel's Daughters (1943)
- The Buchholz Family (1944)
- Marriage of Affection (1944)
- King of Hearts (1947)
- The Cuckoos (1949)
- How Do We Tell Our Children? (1949)
- Bürgermeister Anna (1950)
- The Axe of Wandsbek (1951)
- Das tapfere Schneiderlein (1956)

== Bibliography ==
- Bock, Hans-Michael & Bergfelder, Tim. The Concise CineGraph. Encyclopedia of German Cinema. Berghahn Books, 2009.
