= The Girlfriend of a Big Man =

1934 film

- Film poster
- German: Die Freundin eines großen Mannes
- Directed by: Paul Wegener
- Written by: Hans Lorenz (play); Alfred Möller (play); Philipp Lothar Mayring; Wolf Neumeister
- Produced by: Bruno Duday
- Starring: Käthe von Nagy; Karl Ludwig Diehl; Jessie Vihrog
- Cinematography: Eduard Hoesch
- Edited by: Willy Zeyn
- Music by: Harald Böhmelt
- Production company: UFA
- Distributed by: UFA
- Release date: 14 March 1934
- Running time: 97 minutes
- Country: Nazi Germany
- Language: German

The Girlfriend of a Big Man (German: Die Freundin eines großen Mannes) is a 1934 German comedy film directed by Paul Wegener and starring Käthe von Nagy, Karl Ludwig Diehl and Jessie Vihrog.

The film's sets were designed by the art director Erich Kettelhut and Max Mellin.

== Cast ==
- Käthe von Nagy as Marga Köhler
- Karl Ludwig Diehl as Peters
- Jessie Vihrog as Sigrid Mansfeld
- Hans Brausewetter as Ullrich
- Harry Frank as Willrodt
- Ernst Behmer as Gärtner
- Theodor Loos as Dr. Nordegg
- Ernst Legal as curtain puller
- Gustav Püttjer as stage master
- Hans Zesch-Ballot as Hollberg
- Werner Finck as Banz
- Hans Leibelt as Rieder, the banker
