= Carousel (1937 film) =

1937 film

- Directed by: Alwin Elling
- Written by: Alwin Elling; Erwin Kreker; Franz Rauch
- Produced by: Hans Herbert Ulrich; Robert Wüllner
- Starring: Marika Rökk; Georg Alexander; Paul Henckels
- Cinematography: Robert Baberske
- Edited by: Johanna Rosinski
- Music by: Will Meisel
- Production company: UFA
- Distributed by: UFA
- Release date: 2 August 1937
- Running time: 89 minutes
- Country: Germany
- Language: German

Carousel (German: Karussell) is a 1937 German musical film directed by Alwin Elling and starring Marika Rökk, Georg Alexander, and Paul Henckels. It was shot at the Babelsberg Studios of UFA in Potsdam. The film's sets were designed by the art directors Artur Günther and Karl Vollbrecht.

== Cast ==
- Marika Rökk as Erika Hübner
- Georg Alexander as Hans Roewer
- Paul Henckels as Theodor Huhn
- Aribert Mog as Paul Hübner
- Richard Korn as Fritz Nordmann
- Robert Dorsay as Otto Petersen
- Ernst Dernburg as Dr. Wienowski
- Elga Brink as Adda Wienowski
- Hildegard Fränzel as Hermine Kuntze
- Martha Ziegler as Hausmädchen
- Otto Ruban
- Erika Fischer
- Bob Bauer
- Franz von Bokay
- Eva Behmer
- Gustaf Dennert
- Fritz Draeger
- Anita Düwell
- Isolde Laux
- Josef Reithofer
- Erik Schubert
- Alfred Schwarz
- Kai-Siegfried Seefeld
- Christa Thomsen
- Bruno Tillessen
- Jörn Valery
- Robert Vincenti-Lieffertz
- Hardy Vogdt
- Michael von Newlinsky
- Sergei Woischeff

== Bibliography ==
- Kreimeier, Klaus (1999). The Ufa Story: A History of Germany's Greatest Film Company, 1918–1945. Berkeley: University of California Press. ISBN 978-0-520-22069-0.
