= Harald Böhmelt =

German composer

- Born: 23 October 1900; Halle, Province of Saxony, Kingdom of Prussia, German Empire
- Died: 15 October 1982 (aged 81); Bad Tölz, Bavaria, West Germany
- Occupation: Composer
- Years active: 1932–1961 (film)

Harald Böhmelt (1900–1982) was a German composer of film scores.

== Selected filmography ==
- A Girl You Don't Forget (1932)
- Little Man, What Now? (1933)
- Little Girl, Great Fortune (1933)
- Charley's Aunt (1934)
- Love Conquers All (1934)
- Love and the First Railway (1934)
- The Girlfriend of a Big Man (1934)
- Such a Rascal (1934)
- The Valiant Navigator (1935)
- The Abduction of the Sabine Women (1936)
- I Was Jack Mortimer (1935)
- Susanne in the Bath (1936)
- Crooks in Tails (1937)
- The Tiger of Eschnapur (1938)
- The Indian Tomb (1938)
- Woman at the Wheel (1939)
- U-Boote westwärts! (1941)
- The Thing About Styx (1942)
- A Flea in Her Ear (1943)
- Kohlhiesel's Daughters (1943)
- Scandal at the Embassy (1950)
- Once on the Rhine (1952)
- Love's Awakening (1953)
- I'll See You at Lake Constance (1956)
- The Red Hand (1960)

== Bibliography ==
- Giesen, Rolf. Nazi Propaganda Films: A History and Filmography. McFarland, 2003.
