= Fritz Maurischat =

German production designer

- Born: Artur Georg Fritz Maurischat; April 27, 1893; Berlin, German Empire
- Died: December 11, 1986 (aged 93); Wiesbaden, West Germany
- Occupations: Production designer, art director
- Years active: 1924–1962
- Known for: Art direction on *Titanic* (1943), Oscar‑nominated work on *Martin Luther* (1953)
- Awards: Academy Award nomination (1954); German Filmband in Gold (1970)

Fritz Maurischat (April 27, 1893 in Berlin – December 11, 1986) was a German production designer. He made his film debut in 1924. Over the next 38 years, he worked on over 70 films, all of them in his native Germany.

He earned an Oscar nomination in 1953 for his work on the film Martin Luther, an American film about Martin Luther made in Germany. He is also noted as the Art Director for the 1943 Nazi propaganda film Titanic.

== Selected filmography ==
- Taxi at Midnight (1929)
- The Ship of Lost Souls (1929)
- Salto Mortale (1931)
- The Night Without Pause (1931)
- The Rebel (1932)
- Spell of the Looking Glass (1932)
- The Page from the Dalmasse Hotel (1933)
- Little Girl, Great Fortune (1933)
- Anna and Elizabeth (1933)
- The Voice of Love (1934)
- Decoy (1934)
- A Girl Whirls By the World (1934)
- A Night of Change (1935)
- Demon of the Himalayas (1935)
- The Old and the Young King (1935)
- Family Parade (1936)
- Martha (1936)
- Ball at the Metropol (1937)
- The Unexcused Hour (1937)
- Sergeant Berry (1938)
- A Man Astray (1940)
- Trenck the Pandur (1940)
- Carl Peters (1941)
- Secret File W.B.1 (1942)
- Wedding Night In Paradise (1950)
- When a Woman Loves (1950)
- Love's Awakening (1953)
- Roses from the South (1954)
- Dunja (1955)
- Love's Carnival (1955)
- Without You All Is Darkness (1956)
- The Ideal Woman (1959)

== See also ==
- List of German-speaking Academy Award winners and nominees
