= Street Music (1936 film) =

1936 German film directed by Hans Deppe

- Directed by: Hans Deppe
- Written by: Paul Schurek (play); Hans Deppe; Walter Gronostay
- Starring: Jessie Vihrog; Fritz Genschow; Ernst Legal
- Cinematography: Franz Koch
- Edited by: Gottlieb Madl
- Music by: Walter Gronostay
- Production company: Bavaria Film
- Distributed by: Bavaria Film
- Release date: 10 July 1936
- Running time: 93 minutes
- Country: Germany
- Language: German

Street Music (German: Straßenmusik) is a 1936 German comedy film directed by Hans Deppe and starring Jessie Vihrog, Fritz Genschow and Ernst Legal. The film's sets were designed by the art director Max Seefelder. It was made by Bavaria Film at the Emelka Studios in Munich.

== Plot ==
Hans, Otto and Paul are unemployed musicians. Grete, a neighbor, supports their efforts to become street musicians. Otto finds a valuable object but instead of turning it in, he sells it to buy alcoholic drinks. Hans spends his money with a widowed woman, Hilde, unaware that Grete is pregnant from him.

== Cast ==
- Jessie Vihrog as Grete Witt
- Fritz Genschow as Hans Lünk - Straßenmusikant
- Hans Deppe as Paul Spittel - Straßenmusikant
- Ernst Legal as Otto Brommel - Straßenmusikant
- Fita Benkhoff as Hilde Neumann - eine junge Witwe
- Karl Valentin as Kürassier-Otto
- Liesl Karlstadt as Seine Frau
- Otto Wernicke as Godemann - Gastwirt
- Josef Eichheim as Der Bräutigam
- Else Reval as Ottilie Jänicke - die verlassene Braut
- Ernst Martens as Der Rundfunktintendant
- Alfons Teuber as Der Rundfunkansager
- Ernst Fritz Fürbringer as Geschäftsführer im Café 'Dorado'
- Willem Holsboer as Oberkellner
- Walter Holten as Ein Kriminalbeamter
- Hans Kraft as Gerichtsvollzieher

== Bibliography ==
- Jennifer M. Kapczynski & Michael D. Richardson. A New History of German Cinema. Boydell & Brewer, 2014.
