= A Night of Change =

1935 film

- Directed by: Hans Deppe
- Written by: Hans Rameau
- Produced by: Alberto Giacalone; Alfred Kern
- Starring: Gustav Fröhlich; Heinrich George; Rose Stradner
- Cinematography: Bruno Mondi
- Edited by: Carl Otto Bartning
- Music by: Walter Gronostay
- Production companies: Itala-Film; Otzoup-Film
- Release date: 31 May 1935
- Country: Germany
- Language: German

A Night of Change (German: Nacht der Verwandlung) is a 1935 German drama film directed by Hans Deppe and starring Gustav Fröhlich, Heinrich George, and Rose Stradner. It was made at the Grunewald Studios in Berlin. The film's sets were designed by the art director Fritz Maurischat and Karl Weber.

== Cast ==
- Gustav Fröhlich as Frank Cornelius
- Heinrich George as Boris Pettkoff
- Rose Stradner as Maria, seine Frau
- Ellen Frank as Fräulein Neville
- Max Gülstorff as Philippe de Brissac, Senator
- Gertrud Wolle as Amélie, seine Frau
- F.W. Schröder-Schrom as Professor Janta
- Harry Hardt as Kommissar Nicole
- Hans von Zedlitz as Direktor Berthier
- Else Lüders as Seine Frau
- Arthur Reinhardt as Ein Kriminalbeamter
- Walter Steinweg as Rundfunkansager
- Otto Graf as René Duval
- Hans Albin
- Lothar Devaal
- Lucie Euler
- Edmund Firsbach
- Ilse Pütz
- Ernesto Remani
- Robert Vincenti-Lieffertz

== Bibliography ==
- Bock, Hans-Michael; Bergfelder, Tim, eds. (2009). The Concise Cinegraph: Encyclopaedia of German Cinema. New York: Berghahn Books. ISBN 978-1-57181-655-9.
- Klaus, Ulrich J. Deutsche Tonfilme: Jahrgang 1933. Klaus-Archiv, 1988.
