= Gustav Püttjer =

German actor (1886–1959)

- Born: 15 May 1886; Hamburg, German Empire
- Died: 11 August 1959 (aged 73); East Berlin, East Germany
- Occupation: Film actor

Gustav Püttjer (15 May 1886 – 11 August 1959) was a German film actor who appeared in around 150 feature films between 1927 and 1959. He largely played character parts. After the Second World War he settled in East Germany appearing in the films of the state-controlled company DEFA.

== Selected filmography ==
- The Fourth from the Right (1929)
- The Last Company (1930)
- Road to Rio (1931)
- A Woman Branded (1931)
- The Street Song (1931)
- F.P.1 (1932)
- Five from the Jazz Band (1932)
- Haunted People (1932)
- All is at Stake (1932)
- Here's Berlin (1932)
- A Bit of Love (1932)
- The Importance of Being Earnest (1932)
- Scandal on Park Street (1932)
- Things Are Getting Better Already (1932)
- Dreaming Lips (1932)
- The House of Dora Green (1933)
- Life Begins Tomorrow (1933)
- Two Good Comrades (1933)
- Girls of Today (1933)
- Black Fighter Johanna (1934)
- Police Report (1934)
- The Girlfriend of a Big Man (1934)
- Decoy (1934)
- A Girl Whirls By the World (1934)
- The Voice of Love (1934)
- The Four Musketeers (1934)
- Artisten (1935)
- Variety (1935)
- Pillars of Society (1935)
- Moscow-Shanghai (1936)
- The Merry Wives (1936)
- Ninety Minute Stopover (1936)
- Under Blazing Heavens (1936)
- Fridericus (1937)
- Men Without a Fatherland (1937)
- Strong Hearts in the Storm (1937)
- Seven Slaps (1937)
- Comrades at Sea (1938)
- Monika (1938)
- The Woman at the Crossroads (1938)
- One Night in May (1938)
- Red Orchids (1938)
- Freight from Baltimore (1938)
- The Great and the Little Love (1938)
- Women for Golden Hill (1938)
- The Day After the Divorce (1938)
- Aufruhr in Damaskus (1939)
- Men Are That Way (1939)
- The Fox of Glenarvon (1940)
- Small Town Poet (1940)
- The Way to Freedom (1941)
- Diesel (1942)
- Back Then (1943)
- Melody of a Great City (1943)
- A Cheerful House (1944)
- The Woman of My Dreams (1944)
- Chemistry and Love (1948)
- Quartet of Five (1949)
- The Great Mandarin (1949)
- Bürgermeister Anna (1950)
- Five Suspects (1950)
- Der Kahn der fröhlichen Leute (1950)
- The Call of the Sea (1951)
- The Last Year (1951)
- Stärker als die Nacht (1954)
- Old Barge, Young Love (1957)
- SAS 181 Does Not Reply (1959)

== Bibliography ==
- Shandley, Robert. Rubble Films: German Cinema in the Shadow of the Third Reich. Temple University Press, 2001.
- Youngkin, Stephen D. The Lost One: A Life of Peter Lorre. University Press of Kentucky, 2005.
