= Walter Gronostay =

German composer

- Born: 29 July 1906; Berlin, Brandenburg; German Empire
- Died: 10 October 1937 (aged 31); Potsdam, Brandenburg; Germany
- Occupation: Composer
- Years active: 1929 - 1937 (film)

Walter Gronostay (1906–1937) was a German composer noted for his work on film scores. Gronostay studied under Arnold Schoenberg. From the late 1920s he began working on film music for a mixture of feature films and documentaries. Along with Herbert Windt he composed the music for Leni Riefenstahl's 1938 documentary Olympia, but died unexpectedly at the age of 31 before the film was released.

== Selected filmography ==
- Ripening Youth (1933)
- The Tunnel (1933)
- The Tunnel (1933, French version)
- Lady Windermere's Fan (1935)
- A Night of Change (1935)
- Frisians in Peril (1935)
- Rubber (1936)
- City of Anatol (1936)
- The Last Four on Santa Cruz (1936)
- Street Music (1936)
- Savoy Hotel 217 (1936)
- Wells in Flames (1937)
- The Chief Witness (1937)
- Olympia (1938)
- Revolutionary Wedding (1938)

== Bibliography ==
- Mera, Miguel & Burnand, David. European Film Music. Ashgate Publishing, 2006.
- Rother, Rainer. Leni Riefenstahl: The Seduction of Genius. Bloomsbury Publishing, 2003.
