= The Decoy (1935 film) =

- Directed by: Roger Le Bon; Hans Steinhoff
- Written by: Philipp Lothar Mayring; Georges Neveux; Ludwig von Wohl
- Produced by: Raoul Ploquin; Karl Ritter
- Starring: Edwige Feuillère; Pierre Brasseur; Jessie Vihrog
- Cinematography: Konstantin Irmen-Tschet
- Edited by: Willy Zeyn
- Music by: Friedrich Wilhelm Rust; Walter Schütze
- Production company: UFA
- Distributed by: L'Alliance Cinématographique Européenne
- Release date: 5 April 1935
- Running time: 79 minutes
- Country: Germany
- Language: French

The Decoy or A Mirror for Skylarks (French: Le miroir aux alouettes) is a 1935 adventure film directed by Roger Le Bon and Hans Steinhoff and starring Edwige Feuillère, Pierre Brasseur and Jessie Vihrog.

It was the French-language remake of the 1934 film Decoy. The film was produced by the German company UFA in partnership with its French subsidiary ACE. The French title is a reference to a classic device used as a decoy.

== Cast ==
- Edwige Feuillère as Délia
- Pierre Brasseur as Jean Forestier
- Jessie Vihrog as Jenny
- Lucien Dayle as H. Forestier
- Pierre Labry as Le commandant
- Daniel Mendaille as Le premier officier
- Bill Bocket as Le deuxième officier
- Jeanne Fusier-Gir as La passagère
- Henri Mairet as Le passager
- Raymond Aimos as Dimitri
- Max Maxudian as Le Persan
- Germaine Godefroid
- Roger Karl as L'armateur Dekalf
- Edouard Hamel
- Henri Bosc as Makarian
- Henry Bonvallet

== Bibliography ==
- Rentschler, Eric. The Ministry of Illusion: Nazi Cinema and Its Afterlife. Harvard University Press, 1996.
