= Blind Alley (film) =

1939 film by Charles Vidor

- Directed by: Charles Vidor
- Screenplay by: Philip MacDonald; Michael Blankfort; Albert Duffy
- Based on: James Warwick (from a play by)
- Starring: Chester Morris; Ralph Bellamy; Ann Dvorak
- Cinematography: Lucien Ballard
- Edited by: Otto Meyer
- Color process: Black and white
- Production company: Columbia Pictures
- Distributed by: Columbia Pictures
- Release date: May 11, 1939
- Running time: 69 minutes
- Country: United States
- Language: English

Blind Alley is a 1939 American film noir crime film directed by Charles Vidor and starring Chester Morris, Ralph Bellamy and Ann Dvorak. The film was adapted from the Broadway play of the same name by James Warwick.

Columbia Pictures remade the film as The Dark Past in 1948, with William Holden and Lee J. Cobb.

== Plot ==
Prison escapee and murderer Hal Wilson and his gang take noted psychologist Dr. Shelby and his family hostage in their own home. Shelby psychoanalyzes Wilson to reveal that he has an Oedipus complex and that he murdered his father. Shelby surmises that every murder that Wilson committed during his criminal career was another subconscious attempt to kill his father. When the police arrive, Wilson has a clear shot at an officer but sees his father's face and cannot pull the trigger. The police shoot Wilson dead and rescue Shelby and his family.

== Cast ==
- Chester Morris as Hal Wilson
- Ralph Bellamy as Dr. Shelby
- Ann Dvorak as Mary
- Joan Perry as Linda Curtis
- Melville Cooper as George Curtis
- Rose Stradner as Doris Shelby
- John Eldredge as Dick Holbrook (as John Eldridge)
- Ann Doran as Agnes
- Marc Lawrence as Buck
- Stanley Brown as Fred Landis
- Scotty Beckett as Davy Shelby
- Milburn Stone as Nick
- Marie Blake as Harriet

== Reception ==
In a contemporary review for The New York Times, critic B. R. Crisler wrote: "Given the present confused state of civilization, the union of Chester Morris and psychoanalysis was probably inevitable; after all, there was no point in these two great artistic and intellectual forces remaining aloof from each other indefinitely. Besides, the rather whimsical experiment of grafting Dr. Freud's facile theory of dream symbols on a typical Columbia melodrama has justified itself admirably ... by producing, on the whole, a rather better-than-typical Columbia melodrama. Henceforward, there is no reason why psychoanalysis should be ashamed of Chester Morris, or even why Chester should be ashamed of psychoanalysis."

== Radio adaptation ==
Blind Alley was presented on The Screen Guild Theatre radio program on February 25, 1940, starring Edward G. Robinson and Joseph Calleia.

== See also ==
- List of American films of 1939
