= The Page from the Dalmasse Hotel (1933 film) =

1933 film by Victor Janson

- Directed by: Victor Janson
- Written by: Walter Wassermann
- Based on: The Page from the Dalmasse Hotel by Maria Peteani
- Produced by: Erich Schicker; Karl Schulz; Robert Wüllner
- Starring: Dolly Haas; Harry Liedtke; Hans Junkermann; Trude Hesterberg
- Cinematography: Hugo von Kaweczynski
- Edited by: Roger von Norman
- Music by: Eduard Künneke
- Production companies: Schulz & Wuellner Film
- Distributed by: Terra Film
- Release date: 23 November 1933
- Running time: 83 minutes
- Country: Germany
- Language: German

The Page from the Dalmasse Hotel (German: Der Page vom Dalmasse Hotel) is a 1933 German comedy film directed by Victor Janson and starring Dolly Haas, Harry Liedtke and Hans Junkermann. The art direction was by Fritz Maurischat and Hans Minzloff. The film is based on the novel of the same title by Maria von Peteani. It was later adapted into a 1958 Austrian film.

== Cast ==
- Dolly Haas as Friedel Bornemann
- Harry Liedtke as Baron Arthur von Dahlen
- Hans Junkermann as Baron von Potten
- Trude Hesterberg as Mrs. Wellington
- Gina Falckenberg as Miss Mabel Wellington
- Luise Stösel as Käthe Petersen
- Vera Witt as Frau Petersen
- Walter Steinbeck as Dr. Köppnitz
- Ida Krill as Die Leuteköchin
- Hans Richter as Der Page Ottokar
- Otto Grüneberg as Der Page Paul
- Tommy Thomas as Der Liftchef
- Hans Adalbert Schlettow as Graf Tarvagna
- Erich Fiedler as Sekretär Spöhn
- Maria Reisenhofer as Baronin von Dahlen
- Martha Ziegler as Mädchen bei den von Dahlens
- Albert Hörrmann as Ein Kommissar

== Bibliography ==
- Hake, Sabine. German National Cinema. Routledge, 2008.
