= Academy (disambiguation) =

An academy is an institution of secondary education or higher learning, research, or honorary membership.

Academy may also refer to:

== Education ==
- Academy (English school), formerly known as city academy, type of publicly financed but independently run school
- Academy, one of the school organizational models
- French regional academies overseeing education
- Military academy
- Platonic Academy, the original Academy founded by the philosopher Plato in ancient Greece c. 385 BCE
- Scottish school naming, in Scotland, a quarter of the secondary schools have the word "academy" in their name

== National language regulators ==
- Académie française, the French Academy, pre-eminent French learned body on matters pertaining to the French language, officially established in 1635
- Accademia della Crusca, the Italian institution seeking to maintain the "purity" of the original Italian language
- Real Academia Española, Spanish Royal Academy, the institution responsible for regulating the Spanish language
- Swedish Academy, founded to further the "purity, strength, and sublimity of the Swedish language

See List of language regulators for complete list.

== Arts, entertainment, and media ==
=== Awards ===
- Academia de las Artes y las Ciencias Cinematográficas de España (Academy of Cinematographic Arts and Sciences, or AACCE), a Spanish organization responsible for the Goya Awards
- Academy of Motion Picture Arts and Sciences (AMPAS), an American organization responsible for the Academy Awards (Oscars)

=== Films ===
- Academy (1996 film), an Australian film
- Academy (2007 film), a 2007 Japanese film

=== Music ===
- The Academy (EP), an EP by The Academy Is...
- The Academy (album), an album by Rich Music, Sech and Dalex featuring Justin Quiles, Lenny Tavárez and Feid
  - The Academy: Segunda Misión, its sequel
- The Academy, previous name for alternative rock band Elliot Minor
- The Academy Drum and Bugle Corps, Tempe, Arizona
- Academy of St Martin in the Fields, English orchestra

=== Television ===
- D'Academy or DA (lit. 'Dangdut Academy'), the second present and second largest dangdut music talent show in Indonesia
- The Academy (franchise), a Hong Kong television and film police drama franchise
  - The Academy (Hong Kong TV series), the first series in the franchise from 2005
- The Academy (American TV series), a 2007–2008 American reality television series
- "Academy", an episode of the Max Headroom TV series
- "The Academy", a fifth-season episode of the fantasy television series, Hercules: The Legendary Journeys
- "The Academy" (Star Wars: The Clone Wars)

=== Other uses in arts, entertainment, and media ===
- Academy (video game), a 1987 ZX Spectrum video game
- The Academy (periodical), a London periodical, 1869–1902, published as The Academy and Literature, 1902–1916
- Academy 1-2-3 (cinema), former art house cinema on Oxford Street, London; closed in 1986
- Academy Cinema, Bristol, cinema (1914–55) in Bristol, United Kingdom
- The Academy (novel series), 2010s trilogy

== Businesses ==
- Academia.edu, a repository of academic papers and social network for academics
- Academy Bus, bus company based in New Jersey
- Academy Music Group, owner-operator of British music venues (Carling academy)
- Academy Plastic Model Co., Korean scale model manufacturer
- Academy Sports and Outdoors, sporting goods store
- O2 Brixton Academy, a music venue in London commonly known as The Academy
- The Academy (hotel), a London hotel located in the district of Bloomsbury
- The Academy (music venue), located in Dublin, Ireland
- The Academy Shopping Centre, Aberdeen
- Academy Cinemas (disambiguation)
- Academy Theater (disambiguation)

== Places ==
=== United States ===
- Academy, St. Louis, Missouri
- Academy, South Dakota
- Academy Lake, a lake in South Dakota
- Little River-Academy, Texas, which includes the settlement of Academy

=== Greenland ===
- Academy Fjord
- Academy Glacier (Greenland)
- Academy Glacier (NW Greenland)

=== Elsewhere ===
- Academy Bay, Galapagos islands
- Academy Bay (Sea of Okhotsk)
- Academy Glacier, Antarctica

== Other uses ==
- Academy (automobile), 1906–1908 British automobile
- The Academy (Heathsville, Virginia), US, a historic house
- House of Providence (Vancouver, Washington), commonly known as the Academy building
- National academy
- Youth academy, a youth development system attached to a sports club

== See also ==
- Academia (disambiguation)
- Academic (disambiguation)
- The Academi, Welsh literary agency
- Academi, previously known as Xe Services LLC, Blackwater USA, and Blackwater Worldwide; a private military contractor
- Accies (disambiguation)
- Akademy, an annual contributors and users conference of the KDE community
- Royal Academy (disambiguation) for many institutions of this name
