= John Groser =

Socialist and Anglican priest from England

The Reverend John Groser MC
- Born: St John Beverley Groser; 23 June 1890; Beverley, Western Australia, Australia
- Died: 19 March 1966 (aged 75); Oxford, England
- Education: College of the Resurrection
- Known for: Christian socialist activism
- Political party: Independent Labour Party
- Spouse: Mary Agnes Bucknall (m. 1917)

Ecclesiastical career
- Religion: Christianity (Anglican)
- Church: Church of England
- Ordained: 1914 (deacon); 1915 (priest)
- Congregations: All Saints', Newcastle; St Michael's, Poplar; Christ Church, Watney Street, Stepney; St George in the East; Royal Foundation of St Katharine
- Military career
- Branch: British Army
- Service years: 1915–1918
- Unit: British Expeditionary Force
- Wars: First World War
- Awards: Military Cross

St John Beverley Groser MC (23 June 1890 – 19 March 1966) was an English Anglican priest and prominent Christian socialist. Hannen Swaffer described him as "the best-known priest in the East End [of London]" and Kenneth Leech wrote that he was "one of the most significant Christian socialist figures in twentieth-century Britain".

== Early life and education ==
Groser was born 23 June 1890 in Beverley, Western Australia, one of the English-born Phoebe (née Wainwright) and the American-born Thomas Eaton Groser's eleven children. His father was an Anglican missionary, serving as the local parish's rector and ministering to people on and around the cattle station where they lived. For the first fifteen years of his life, Groser's education consisted primarily of learning the life of a station hand. In 1905 he was sent to England for his academic education, attending Ellesmere College in Shropshire, a school of the Anglo-Catholic Woodard Foundation. He spent the summers on the estate of two women in Hertfordshire, where, as Kenneth Brill and Margaret 'Espinasse wrote, "His love of Britain and his acceptance of her imperial role were reinforced by the charm of upper-class life in a traditional style". Lacking any worldliness, having led a fairly secluded life in rural Australia, he "just took Imperialism for granted", as he would write in his memoir four decades later. He wrote:

The family boasted themselves of old yeoman stock, with a stake in that country since the Norman Conquest; with a rich culture and old world courtesy against which I find it even now difficult to write one word of criticism ... they were really a survival of feudalism. A large estate with a big house full of servants; a good and well-stocked cellar; stables with riding and carriage horses; a couple of farms; and altogether on this estate about one hundred persons. The little church, built for the estate, seated exactly that number. Both there and in the private chapel in the house, where morning prayers were said, every person who was able was expected to be present. The ladies of the house, the last of the direct line, were kindness itself. In those days, before old age pensions became a Government concern, no retainers of long standing were turned off the estate when they were too old to work; but were provided with light work and cottages.

I remember so well how the ladies themselves would set out with broth and baskets of fruit from the garden for the sick and aged. The grace and charm of that life remains as a pleasant recollection:

But it was upheld at a cost. It demanded recognition by each one of a set station in life, an obedience to it with all that that involved and, on top of that, a resolute determination by all to keep at arm's length the outside world, gradually encroaching on their privacy. ... The ordering and setting out of the carriage each day was an event, and a drive round the estate, or a call on one of the other county families, was a ritual. To the passing carriage, every person was expected to doff his cap or curtsy, and failure to do so was met with a severe reprimand. If the footman was not sent at once to bring the offender to the waiting carriage, a sort of private manorial court would deal with the matter during the week. So long as the rules were obeyed, life was pleasant, at least on the surface. The rules were known, and the basis kept before the minds of both master and servant by the reading at least once a week in chapel of one or the other of the passages in St. Paul's Epistles relating to the subject.

But they could not keep the world at bay. For one thing, a new type of retainer was arising who was not content to be looked after at the expense of his freedom. I remember well how at last one man, after many agitated discussions in the drawing-room, was dismissed for being a Socialist. It was, I think, my first real introduction to politics.

After finishing at Ellesmere, Groser spent six years with the Community of the Resurrection, studying at the College of the Resurrection toward ordination as well one year at the University of Leeds. Despite the socialistic teaching at the college, he remained seemingly oblivious to the problems associated with imperialism until his first curacy.

== Military career and curacies in Newcastle and Cornwall ==
Groser's first appointment after his diaconal ordination was a curacy in the slum parish of All Saints', Newcastle upon Tyne, from 1914 to 1919. He was ordained to the priesthood in 1915. It was during this period that Groser became a socialist.

Groser briefly served in the British Expeditionary Force and was sent to France as a chaplain to an infantry regiment during the First World War in 1915. Despite being a chaplain, he reluctantly agreed to lead combat troops during the war under pressure from his commanding officer Alan Hanbury-Sparrow, provided that he could remain unarmed. Years later, reflecting on Groser's initial refusal on the basis that it was wrong for a chaplain to have any role in the killing, Hanbury-Sparrow wrote:

I reminded him that scores of men he knew had fallen that day after having done their utmost; and I was conveying to him – in what words I cannot remember – my despair of a religion that could teach that such a patronizing stand-offish attitude was the right one, when my words were drowned by a terrific outburst of fire from our own guns, who had spotted a counter-attack forming up. When the fire was over Groser told me that he would do what I wanted provided he didn't carry arms. To that I readily agreed.

Groser was mentioned in dispatches in 1917 and was sent home wounded in 1918 following the Battle of Passchendaele. He was awarded the Military Cross for his gallantry during the war in 1918. By this point, he was speaking publicly about his difficulty supporting the war effort, believing it to have been unnecessarily prolonged. Increasingly, he viewed the war as a crime against humanity and as being a result of capitalism.

After the war, Groser served as a messenger for the Church of England Men's Society to the dioceses of Carlisle, Durham, and Newcastle. In 1917 he was posted to a curacy at St Winnow's, Cornwall. Groser married Mary Agnes Bucknall, the daughter of his parish priest, in December of that year. They would go on to have four children together.

== Ministry in London ==
=== St Michael's and Christ Church ===
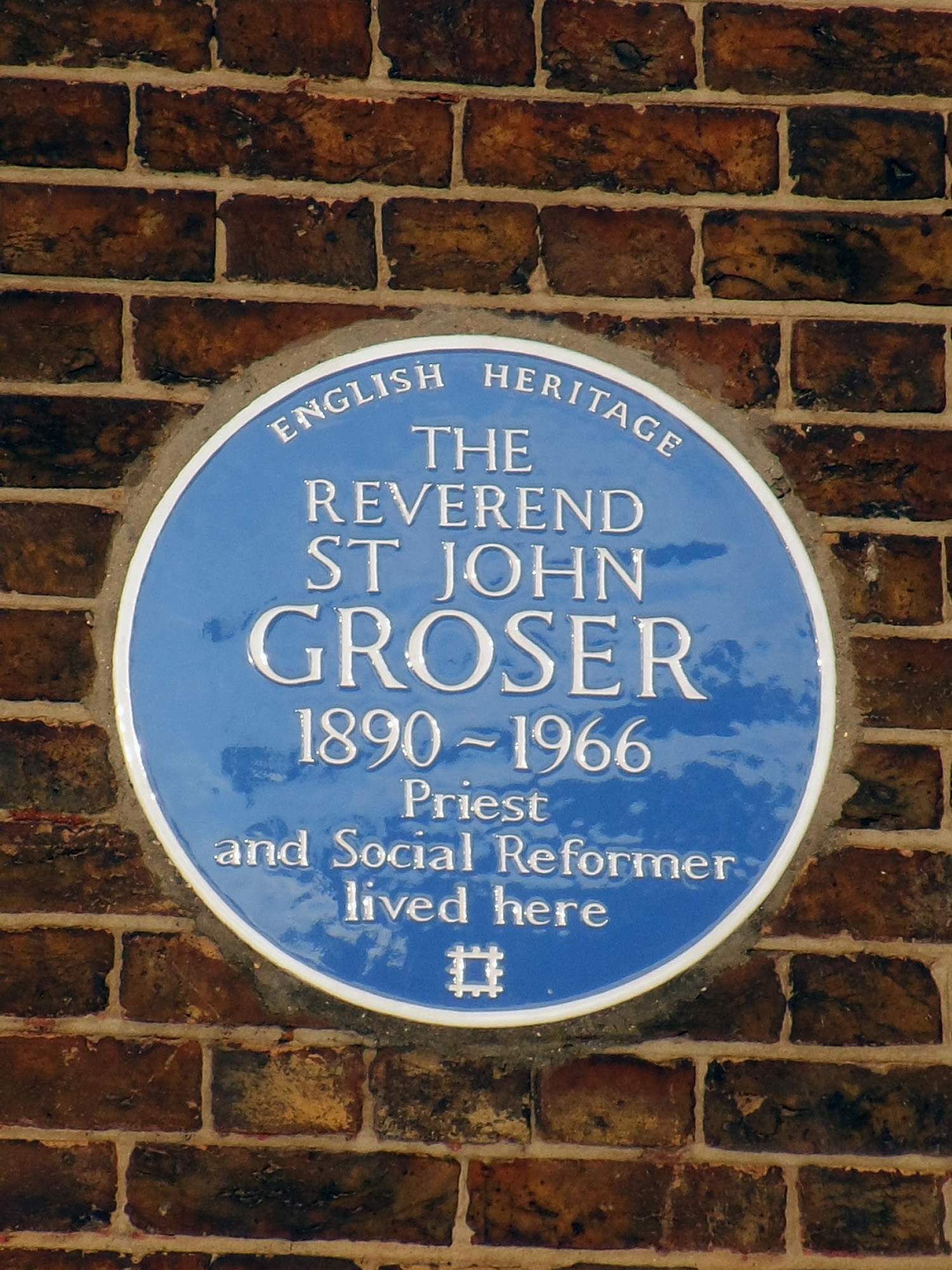
Plaque at 2 Butchers Row, Limehouse

In 1922 Groser was appointed curate of Church of St Michael and All Angels, Bromley-by-Bow, in London's East End, initially serving under the vicar C. G. Langdon.

Many of their parishioners were "dockers, the unemployed, ex-servicemen and others who lived in uncertain poverty". Groser worked alongside his fellow curate and brother-in-law Jack Bucknall. Groser and Bucknall lived next door to one another on Teviot Street and were actively involved in the Anglo-Catholic and revolutionary leftist organization Catholic Crusade with Conrad Noel. While the parish's three priests were all socialists, Groser and Bucknall were substantially more radical than the vicar. On 9 August 1924, Langdon served Groser (and likely Bucknall as well) six months' notice of their termination, saying "it was evident that they were not working together in a way which would advance the work of the parish and expressing deep regret that he saw no other way out of the situation." In the following months, Langdon was replaced as vicar, allowing the curates' departure to be postponed.

Groser was dismissed in 1927 due to his political (left-wing) activism, but his licence to officiate was restored the following year when he was made priest-in-charge of Christ Church, Watney Street, Stepney.

=== Battle of Cable Street ===
In 1936, the British Union of Fascists (BUF) planned a march through the East End (which then had a large Jewish population). The Jewish People's Council organised a petition, calling for the march to be banned, and gathered the signature of 100,000 East Londoners in two days. Groser was part of the community delegation which presented the petition to the Home Office. The petition was unsuccessful so a counter-demonstration was planned; the clashes between the anti-fascists, police and fascists becoming known as the Battle of Cable Street. Groser was present that day, was hit several time by police truncheons and suffered a broken nose.

=== Stepney Tenants Defence League ===
He served as president of the Stepney Tenants' Defence League from its creation in 1937, until his resignation in 1940. The church building was used as the STDL headquarters.

Although rents were lower in the East End than elsewhere, the economically marginalised tenants were less able to pay. Overall they got worse value for money, paying more in relation to space occupied, conditions and amenities that middle-class workers in suburbia. The landlord's business model was to charge relatively high rent and exploit the tenants difficulty in finding suitable alternative accommodation near their place of work. Not needing to attract tenants with high quality homes, the slum landlord's business model was largely based on profit margins derived from the absence of repairs and decoration. This approach could deliver high profits even if that meant the resale property of the property reduced.

Phil Piratin, a partner and ally of the STDL described how landlords compartmentalised their business behaviour from their otherwise respectable lives:

I know one case where a landlord bought slum property and, apart from paying agent fees for collection of rent, incurred no expenditure whatsoever. The annual net amount of rent he was collecting was 50% of the value he had paid for the whole property. He held on for 3 years. In these three years therefore, he got his money back with an additional 50% on his original capital outlay. He then sold the property for one half of what he had paid, to some other notorious slum landlord. His total profit was 100% on his original outlay. This happens to be quite a pleasant person, a good husband and a good father, and quite charitable. To him it was a business deal, to the people living in those tenements it was hell.

— Phil Piratin, Stepney communist organiser.

At its height, the League had three full time organisers, all local communists. Maurice 'Tubby' Rosen was the secretary, and Ella Donovan and Harry Conn were organisers.

As well as rent strikes, tactics would travelling to stage protests outside the City of London workplaces of unscrupulous landlords, or their North London homes.

=== WW2 and after ===
The Blitz brought new pressures, and in 1940 Groser broke into a government food store to distribute rations to those who had been made homeless, organising buses to get them to places of safety.

Christ Church was destroyed in the Blitz in 1941, and Groser and his congregation transferred to St George in the East. He remained there until 1948, when he took up an appointment as warden of the Royal Foundation of St. Katharine. He was appointed chaplain to the Bishop of London after Henry Montgomery Campbell's translation to the see in 1956. Groser died at the Churchill Hospital, Oxford, in 1966, aged 75.

Outside of his priestly duties, Groser played Thomas Becket in the 1951 film Murder in the Cathedral, based on a play by T. S. Eliot. Writing for The New York Times, the reviewer Bosley Crowther praised his acting as "grandly dignified and benign".

== Views ==
Groser was an Anglo-Catholic. Both his secondary school and divinity school were high-church institutions, and he was also influenced by the Catholic Crusade movement of Conrad Noel, a fellow Christian socialist. Groser advocated a return to the festivals, music, dancing, and processions of the medieval English church, and implemented that to some extent with his own congregations. He believed Christianity (and only Christianity) could establish a "new social ethic" and would produce radical social change. A Christian socialist, Groser was influenced by Marxism to some extent, particularly its view of class struggle. He was prominent in the anti-fascist movements of the 1930s.

As he supported a Labour election candidate over a Communist candidate, Groser left Catholic Crusade and, in 1931, founded the League of the Redemption. The league merged with the Socialist Christian League in 1933.

At street corner political meetings, Groser would be flanked by three symbols. The crucifix in the centre, the plain red flag of socialism, and St George's Cross. Groser preferred Saint George's Cross as a symbol of the national community, as he associated the Union Flag with the imperialism which he campaigned against, for instance in promoting Indian independence.

== See also ==
- Diocese of London
- Ella Donovan
- George Lansbury
- Poplar, London
- Bertha Sokoloff
