= Academia =

Academia is the scientific and cultural research and higher education community, taken as a whole. The term primarily refers to:

- Academies, taken as a whole
- Academic institutions, taken as a whole
- Academic disciplines, taken as a whole, studied at academies and academic institutions

Academia may also refer to:

- Academia.edu, a social network
- La Academia, a Mexican television programme
  - La Academia (Paraguayan TV series), a Paraguayan spin-off
  - La Academia USA, an American spin-off
- Academia (Soviet publishing house), a Soviet publishing house
- Academia (Czech publishing house), operated by Czech Academy of Sciences
- Platonic Academy, or Akademia, an ancient school founded by Plato
- "Academia" (song), by Australian singer Sia

== See also ==
- Outline of academia
- Acidemia, the state of low blood pH
- Academic (disambiguation)
- Academy (disambiguation)
- Akademija (disambiguation)
