= La Academia (Paraguayan TV series) =

- Logo
- Directed by: Alejandro Stoessel
- Presented by: Dani da Rosa
- Judges: Jorge Castro; Pedro Ojeda; Julio Juan Del Puerto
- Opening theme: Don't Stop Me Now by Queen
- Country of origin: Paraguay
- Original language: Spanish
- No. of seasons: 1
- No. of episodes: 35

Production
- Executive producer: Selene Ortiz
- Running time: 2 hours
- Production company: Telefuturo

Original release
- Network: Telefuturo
- Release: May 28 – September 24, 2013

La Academia was a Paraguayan musical reality show adapted from the Mexican program La Academia. It was broadcast by Telefuturo from May 28 to September 24, 2013 and hosted by Dani Da Rosa.

== Structure ==
Cities where the auditions were held.

La Academia is a talent show contest where the main requirements are to specialize in singing, dancing, and acting. People vote for their favorite contestant so that they don't end up with the lowest score and have to leave the academy.

Contestants live in a 500 square meter house equipped with 30 cameras, a pool, and a Jacuzzi. They receive classes and live with their peers in confinement. They have a weekly concert where they are evaluated by critics and eliminated until a winner is announced.

Marcelo Iripino is the artistic director of La Academia, and he is accompanied by three teachers. Natalia Valdez is the dance teacher, who is assisted by six dance coaches. David Portillo is the music teacher, who is assisted by six vocal coaches. The third and final teacher of the academy is Néstor Amarilla, who teaches acting.

== Side programs ==
=== The Debate ===
It is a program broadcast every Thursday at 9 pm, hosted by the entertainment journalist and television presenter Mili Brítez. The panelists on the show are: the entertainment journalist Carmiña Masi, the theater and television director (acting coach of La Academia) Néstor Amarilla, and the choreographer and dancer (artistic director of La Academia) Marcelo Iripino.

The program analyzes the entire structure of La Academia, from the personal lives of the participants to conflicts in daily living.

=== La Academia: Live from the house ===
This program is broadcast from Tuesday to Saturday at 12:00 p.m., and on Sundays at 11:30 p.m. It shows the house live and in real-time, and it's broadcast to the television audience via antenna since the 24-hour transmission of the academy is carried out through cable.

=== Road to Fame ===
Behind the scenes (backstage) of everything that happened in the house and the Academy gala, at different times, in the morning, afternoon, and evening. The host of this program is Edwin Storrer.

=== La Academia Summary ===
After almost three months since the program premiered, specifically on August 19, a new supporting program of La Academia premiered on Telefuturo screens, La Academia. It airs from Monday to Friday at 7:00 pm, hosted by Rubén Rubín.

== Seasons ==
=== First Generation ===
The first generation of La Academia in Paraguay for the year 2013 is currently being broadcast. The casting was conducted nationwide in cities such as Itaugua, Villarrica, Ciudad del Este, Asunción, and Encarnación. The 20 selected contestants are individuals between the ages of 15 and 50 of both sexes, who possess some form of artistic knowledge in dancing, singing, or acting.

==== Auditions ====
Date	City	Locale	Notes
February 23, 2013	Itauguá	"Club Nacional" of Itauguá	
March 2, 2013	Villarrica	"Carlos Rubén Cáceres Buscio" Sports Center	
March 9, 2013	Ciudad del Este	"Gimnasio del Saber High School" Sports Center	
March 16, 2013	Asunción	Sports Center of "Universidad Americana"	
March 23, 2013	Encarnación	Elegance Palace Hotel	

==== Contestants ====
Contestants	City	Age	State	Stay
Marilina Bogado	Villarrica	18	Winner	119 days
José David "Troche" Giménez	Mauricio José Troche	20	Runner-up	119 days
Fabio Gimenez	Coronel Oviedo	19	17th eliminated	119 days
Hector Pacheco	Asunción	22	16th eliminated	119 days
Jazmin Diaz	Lambaré	24	15th eliminated	114 days
Fabiani Cantero	Ciudad del Este	18	14th eliminated	112 days
Eric Rodriguez	Mariano Roque Alonso	27	13th eliminated	98 days
Juan Marcelo Bottini	Ciudad del Este	29	1st withdrew	94 days
Ulises Gonzalez	San Antonio	21	12th eliminated	91 days
Hector Britos	Villarrica	23	11th eliminated	84 days
David "Punchi" Torres	Coronel Oviedo	19	10th eliminated	77 days
Ara Jimenez	Ciudad del Este	19	9th eliminated	70 days
Ada Zaracho	Fernando de la Mora	26	8th eliminated	63 days
Carol Melo	Ciudad del Este	25	7th eliminated	56 days
Felipe Figuereido	Ciudad del Este	23	6th eliminated	49 days
Elizabeth "Eli" Florentin	Lambaré	21	5th eliminated	42 days
Gabriela "Gabi" Aguero	San Juan Bautista	20	4th eliminated	35 days
Jessica Brugada	Asunción	21	3rd eliminated	28 days
Esteban Alvarez	Encarnación	22	2nd eliminated	22 days
Florencia Blokker	Asunción	21	1st eliminated	15 days

== See also ==
- La Academia
- La Academia USA
- Akademi Fantasi Indosiar
- Akademi Fantasia (Malaysia)
- Academy Fantasia (Thailand)
