= 12th Venice International Film Festival =

Italian film festival in 1951

- Location: Venice, Italy
- Founded: 1932
- Awards: Golden Lion of Saint Mark: Rashomon
- Festival date: 20 August – 10 September 1951
- Website: Website

Venice Film Festival chronology
- 13th 11th

The 12th annual Venice International Film Festival was held from 20 August to 10 September 1951.

Italian film critic Mario Gromo, was the jury president for the main competition. The Golden Lion of Saint Mark was awarded to Rashomon by Akira Kurosawa.

== Jury ==
- Mario Gromo, Italian film critic - Jury President
- Antonio Baldini, Italian writer
- Piero Gadda Conti, Italian film critic
- Ermanno Contini
- Fabrizio Dentice, Italian composer
- Vinicio Marinucci
- Gian Gaspare Napolitano, Italian journalist
- Gian Luigi Rondi, Italian screenwriter
- Giorgio Vigolo

== Official Sections ==
=== Main Competition ===
English title	Original title	Director(s)	Production country
Alice in Wonderland		Clyde Geronimi, Wilfred Jackson, Hamilton Luske	United States
Ace in the Hole		Billy Wilder	United States
Born Yesterday		George Cukor	United States
Diary of a Country Priest	Journal d'un curé de campagne	Robert Bresson	France
Fourteen Hours		Henry Hathaway	United States
Four Ways Out	La città si difende	Pietro Germi	Italy
Rashomon	羅生門	Akira Kurosawa	Japan
The Lavender Hill Mob		Charles Crichton	United Kingdom
Murder in the Cathedral		George Hoellering	United Kingdom
The Night Is My Kingdom	La Nuit est mon royaume	Georges Lacombe	France
The River	Le Fleuve	Jean Renoir	France
A Streetcar Named Desire		Elia Kazan	United States
Teresa		Fred Zinnemann	United States

== Official Awards ==
=== Main Competition ===
- Golden Lion of Saint Mark: Rashomon by Akira Kurosawa
- Best Italian Film: Four Ways Out by Pietro Germi
- Special Jury Prize: A Streetcar Named Desire by Elia Kazan
- Volpi Cup for Best Actor: Jean Gabin for The Night Is My Kingdom
- Volpi Cup for Best Actress: Vivien Leigh for A Streetcar Named Desire
- Best Original Screenplay: T. E. B. Clarke for The Lavender Hill Mob
- Best Cinematography: Léonce-Henri Burel for Diary of a Country Priest
- Best Original Music: Hugo Friedhofer for Ace in the Hole

== Independent Awards ==
=== International Award ===
- Diary of a Country Priest by Robert Bresson
- The River by Jean Renoir
- Ace in the Hole by Billy Wilder

=== OCIC Award ===
- Diary of a Country Priest by Robert Bresson

=== Italian Film Critics Award ===
- Rashomon (Akira Kurosawa)
- Diary of a Country Priest by Robert Bresson
- Special Prize: Peter Pendrey for Murder in the Cathedral (For the best production design)
