= Awolowo Detention Camp =

Historical Site in Lagos

Jurisdictional structure
- Operations jurisdiction: Nigeria
- Governing body: Lagos State Government

Awolowo Detention Camp is a facility owned by the Federal Government of Nigeria and situated in Lekki, Lagos. It is the place where Obafemi Jeremiah Awolowo was restricted to in the year 1962 for 16 days.

== History ==
Action Party, the opposition party to the government of Nigeria was led by Chief Obafemi Awolowo, his leadership was subjected to a political motivated trial and sentenced by the former President Babangida. The facility was remodelled as an institute by the former governor of Lagos State, Babatunde Fashola in June 2009.
