= Peter Strausfeld =

German-British artist (1910–1980)

- Born: 14 September 1910; Cologne, Rhine Province, Kingdom of Prussia, German Empire
- Died: 9 July 1980 (aged 69); Brighton, England
- Occupations: Artist; illustrator; animator
- Known for: Academy Cinema film posters
- Spouse: Margaret B. "Peggy" Pendrey (m. 1938)

Peter Strausfeld (14 September 1910 – 9 July 1980) was a German-born British artist, illustrator and animator, particularly known for his film posters. For 33 years, from 1947 until his death, he created hand-printed linocut posters for each film shown at the three-screen Academy Cinema, London's leading art house cinema.

== Early life ==
Strausfeld was born in Cologne in September 1910.

== Career ==
Strausfeld moved to Brighton, England, in 1938, due to his being politically and culturally opposed to the Nazi regime. However, he was interned in Onchan on the Isle of Man from 1940 to 1941, where he became good friends with the Austrian film producer George Hoellering. Hoellering ran the Academy Cinema, London's leading art house cinema, in Oxford Street. Hoellering disliked the posters provided by the studios and had Strausfeld designed original posters for the films; Strausfeld designed posters from 1947 until his death in 1980. An exhibit of Strausfeld's work for the Academy Cinema, Art for Art House: The Posters of Peter Strausfeld, was shown at the Poster House from November 13, 2025 – April 12, 2026.

Strausfeld created all of the images in linocut or woodcut and they appeared in many London Underground stations. He created posters for over 300 different films, all printed by hand in runs of up to 100, rising to 300 in the mid-1970s, and as most were used in Underground stations, few copies survive. His wife Peggy admired his work, and kept a copy of each; in some cases, that is the only copy known to have survived.

During the Second World War, after his release from internment, he created the animation for several short animated films for the Ministry of Information: Peak Load Electricity (1943), Salvage Saves Shipping (1943), Skeleton in the Cupboard (1943), and Tim Marches Back (1944). Hoellering was usually the director or producer.

In 1951, he was the production designer for the film Murder in the Cathedral, directed and produced by Hoellering, for which Strausfeld (as Peter Pendrey) won the Special Prize for the best production design at the 12th Venice International Film Festival.

From 1959 to 1980, Strausfeld lectured at Brighton College of Art and then in Brighton Polytechnic's department of graphics.

== Personal life ==
Strausfeld married Margaret B. "Peggy" Pendrey in Brighton in 1938, and he sometimes used the pseudonym Peter Pendrey.

Strausfeld died in Brighton in 1980.
