= Athens academy (disambiguation) =

Athens Academy may refer to:

== Organisations ==
- Platonic Academy, the academy founded by Plato
- Academy of Athens (modern), Greece's national academy
- Athens Academy (school), a private school in Oconee County, Georgia
- Athens Female Academy, the original name of the institution in Alabama now called Athens State University

== Geography ==
- two neighbourhoods of Athens, in Greece:
  - Akadimia, named after the modern Academy
  - Akadimia Platonos, named after Plato's Academy
- Akadimias Street, a central thoroughfare in Athens, near the modern Academy

== Other ==
- Plato's Academy (film), 2006 movie by Filippos Tsitos, named after the Athens neighbourhood

== See also ==
- Academy (disambiguation)
- Athens (disambiguation)
