= Academic =

Academic or academics may refer to:

- Academic discipline, a subdivision of knowledge that is taught and researched at the college or university level
- Academic institution, an educational institution dedicated to education and research
- Academic research, creative and systematic work undertaken to increase the stock of knowledge
- Academic staff, or faculty, teachers or research staff
- Anything relating to an academy
- Academic publishing, of texts for educational purposes
- Academic work
- Academic writing, nonfiction writing that is produced as part of academic work
- School of philosophers associated with the Platonic Academy in ancient Greece
- Academic art, 19th-century French style
- The Academic, Irish indie rock band
- "Academic", song by New Order from the 2015 album Music Complete

== Other uses ==
- Academia (disambiguation)
- Academy (disambiguation)
- Faculty (disambiguation)
- Scholar, a person who is a researcher or has expertise in an academic discipline
