= Splendrillia academica =

Scientific classification
- Kingdom: Animalia
- Phylum: Mollusca
- Class: Gastropoda
- Subclass: Caenogastropoda
- Order: Neogastropoda
- Superfamily: Conoidea
- Family: Drilliidae
- Genus: Splendrillia
- Species: S. academica

Binomial name
- Splendrillia academica McLean & Poorman, 1971

Species of gastropod

Splendrillia academica is a species of sea snail, a marine gastropod mollusk in the family Drilliidae. There has been only 2 specimens of Splendrillia academia.

== Description ==
The length of the shell attains an average of 13.7mm, its diameter 5.3mm (maximum height 20mm). The shell of Splendrillia academica is dull, banded with the color blue gray, another dark brown band that connects the peripheral nodes, an aperture that is only ^{1}/_{3} the size of the shell with a protoconch of 2 smooth whorls with the central tip of the shell and a spiral sculpture that's usually 8 grooves upon the pillar.

== Distribution ==
This species occurs in the demersal zone of the Eastern Pacific Ocean off Isla Santa Cruz, Galapagos Islands, at a depth of 60 m (only in subtropical places).

== Biology ==
This species of sea snail is a non broadcast spawner. Its lifecycle doesn't include a trochophore stage.

== Etymology ==
The specific name is named after Academy Bay of Santa Cruz.
