= Ivo Jarosy =

Ivo Rudolph Jarosy (9 November 1921 – 1 May 1996) was a German-born British film publicist and cinema manager who ran London's Academy 1-2-3 for many years.

He was born in Berlin on 9 November 1921, the son of Dora Constance Lehmann and her first husband, Anton Jarosy (1887–1951), a Jewish Yugoslavian artist. Her second husband was the Austrian film director, editor and producer George Hoellering, who became Jarosy's stepfather.

Jarosy married Joan Grant in 1952 and they had two sons. He died in London on 1 May 1996.

In the mid-1960s, Joan Jarosy (1922–2012) founded the International Neighbours Housing Association, one of the first new-style housing associations.
