= Akademija =

Akademija may refer to:

- Akademija, Kaunas, a town in Kaunas District Municipality, Kaunas County, Lithuania
- Akademija, Kėdainiai, a town in Kėdainiai District Municipality, Kaunas County, Lithuania
- Akademija-MRU, a former Lithuanian basketball club from Vilnius.

== See also ==
- Academia (disambiguation)
