= Edith Ramsay =

British educator and activist

Edith Ramsay (1895–1983) was an English educator and community activist who served on the Colonial Office Advisory Committee. Ramsay worked to improve conditions for immigrants arriving in Stepney, London in the mid-20th century and was known as "the Florence Nightingale of the Brothels" for her work in London slums.

Edith Ramsay was born in Highgate in 1895, where her father Alexander Ramsay was the first minister of the local Presbyterian Church. In later life, Ramsay identified the devastation of the First World War (including the death of her older brother) as a key influence on her decision to take up welfare work.

From 1922-1925, Edith worked as the Stepney Children's Care Organizer and was responsible for distributing free meals, clothing and milk. In 1928, she became the manager of Heckford Street Evening Institute that offered classes for mothers, workers and the unemployed. In 1951 Ramsay was amongst the campaigners who successfully fought for the re-opening of 'Colonial House', a Colonial Office hostel and recreation centre for members of the African-Caribbean community in Leman Street, Stepney.

Ramsay has been featured in documentaries, and had a book written about her by a colleague, Bertha Sokoloff, titled Edith and Stepney: 60 Years of Education, Politics and Social Change: The Life of Edith Ramsey. Ramsay's work with immigrants in Stepney during the 1940s-1980s was marked with a workshop series that explored her archives during Black History Month in 2018. Gateway Housing Association in London contains a housing complex named after her, and a tree was planted in her honour by member of Parliament, Rushanara Ali.
