= Hunting You =

1929 film

- Directed by: Ernst Angel
- Written by: Ernst Angel
- Produced by: George Hoellering
- Cinematography: Eugen Schüfftan
- Edited by: Kuron Gogol
- Production company: Erdeka Film
- Release date: 1929
- Country: Germany
- Languages: Silent; German intertitles

Hunting You (German: Jagd auf dich) is a 1929 German silent film directed by Ernst Angel.

The film's art direction was by Fritz Maurischat.

== Cast ==
- Valerie Boothby
- Tanaroff Olek
- Hans Schweikart
- Geza L. Weiss

== Bibliography ==
- Hagener, Malte (2014). The Emergence of Film Culture: Knowledge Production, Institution Building, and the Fate of the Avant-garde in Europe, 1919–1945. New York: Berghahn Books. ISBN 978-1-78238-424-3.
