= Academy Lake =

- Location within the United States
- Location: Charles Mix County, South Dakota
- Coordinates: 43.462859°N 99.110371°W
- Type: Reservoir
- Surface elevation: 1,627 feet (496 m)

Academy Lake is a reservoir in Charles Mix County, South Dakota, in the United States.

Academy Lake took its name from nearby Academy, South Dakota.

== See also ==
- List of lakes in South Dakota
