= Facility =

Place for doing something

A facility is a place for doing something, or a place that facilitates an activity. Types of facility include A building, especially one with a staff, such as a hotel, resort, school, office complex, psychiatric hospital, sports arena, or convention center

- Medical facility
- Assisted living facility
- Correctional facility - a prison or jail
- Post-production facility
- Sports facility
- Telecommunications facility
- Public toilet, euphemistically called "facilities"

== See also ==
- Faculty (disambiguation)
