= Murder in the Cathedral (1951 film) =

1951 film

- Theatrical release poster
- Directed by: George Hoellering
- Screenplay by: T. S. Eliot; George Hoellering
- Based on: Murder in the Cathedral by T. S. Eliot
- Produced by: George Hoellering
- Starring: Father John Groser
- Cinematography: David Kosky
- Edited by: Anne Allnatt
- Music by: László Lajtha
- Production company: Film Traders Ltd
- Distributed by: Film Traders Ltd
- Release dates: 1951 (Venice); March 1952 (United Kingdom)
- Running time: Original release: 146 minutes; 2015 re-release: 114 minutes
- Country: United Kingdom
- Language: English

Murder in the Cathedral is a 1951 British drama film directed and produced by George Hoellering and co-written by Hoellering and T. S. Eliot based on Eliot's 1935 verse drama of the same name and starring Father John Groser.

The film competed at the 12th Venice International Film Festival and received the award for Best Production Design, given to Peter Pendrey. It was released in the United Kingdom in 1952.

== Plot ==
Archbishop Thomas Becket (Father John Groser) deals with his temptations before his murder in the Canterbury Cathedral in 1170.

== Differences from the play ==
A number of changes were made for the film. Three of them are particularly notable.

The fourth tempter is not seen; only a voice is heard, which was Eliot himself speaking the lines.

George Hoellering, the film's director, recognized that general audiences might not know the events that preceded the action of the play. He informed Eliot of this and asked for a new scene which depicted the central reasons leading to the events in the play. Eliot complied.

Hoellering also thought the knights' final speeches were a problem because "in stage productions these speeches amused the audience instead of shocking them, and thereby made them miss the point—the whole point of the play." He asked Eliot for changes; and Eliot made major reductions to the speeches and added a shorter speech.

== Cast ==
- Father John Groser as Thomas Becket, Archbishop of Canterbury
- Alexander Gauge as King Henry II
- David Ward as first tempter
- George Woodbridge as second tempter
- Basil Burton as third tempter
- T. S. Eliot as voice of fourth tempter
- Donald Bisset as first priest
- Clement McCallin as first knight
- Michael Aldridge as second knight
- Leo McKern as third knight
- Paul Rogers as fourth knight
- Alban Blakelock as Bishop Foliot
- Niall MacGinnis as herald

== Release ==
Murder in the Cathedral premiered at the 12th Venice International Film Festival in 1951 before being theatrically released by Film Traders Ltd in the United Kingdom in March 1952 and in the United States by Classic Pictures on 25 March 1952.

== Reception ==
Bosley Crowther wrote in The New York Times:

Whatever literary merits T. S. Eliot's Murder in the Cathedral may have and whatever strange dramatic virtues it may possess in performance on a stage, it is obvious that this stylized verse drama is not felicitous material for the screen. ...

There are flashes of stark pictorial beauty in some of the somber scenes of prelates and noblemen and worshippers gathered in the Archbishop's Hall of Canterbury Cathedral, where the entire action of the play takes place. And some nods toward cinema dynamics are more or less effectively made in not too imaginative cutting for dramatic emphasis and flow.

But, for the most part, Mr. Eliot's cold recounting of Becket's defiance of the King and his murder by helmeted assassins for insisting upon the Church's authority is conveyed in lengthy orations by individuals and choral groups, photographed in static poses and solemnly massed attitudes. ...

Fortunately, the spoken words have richness as they flow off the cultivated tongues of handsomely costumed performers who, at least, look their medieval roles. Father John Groser, an English cleric, is grandly dignified and benign as the conscientious Archbishop who coolly calculates his martyrdom and Alexander Gauge is forceful as King Henry in a scene especially written for the film.
