= Outline of academia =

Overview of and topical guide to academia

The following outline is provided as an overview of and topical guide to academia:

Academia – nationally and internationally recognized establishment of professional scholars and students, working for the most part in colleges and universities, who are engaged in higher education and research.

Academy – Institution of higher learning

Academic institution – Institution granting academic degrees

== Purposes of academia ==
- Tertiary education
- Research

== Branches of academia ==
- Academic disciplines
- Doctoral studies

== Academic positions ==
- Academic administration
- Academic ranks
- Professor
- Tenure

== Academic communication ==
- Academic conference
- Academic publishing
- Academic journal
- Academic article
- Academic literature
- Academic writing
- Peer review
- Scholarly communication
- Journal ranking

== Academic culture ==
- Academic acceleration
- Academic dishonesty (Scientific misconduct)
- Academic discipline (Scientific community)
- Academic degree
- Academic dress
- Academic inflation
- Academic mobility
- Bullying in academia
- Ivory tower
- Town and gown
- Scholarly method (Scientific method)

== See also ==
- Outline of education
- Outline of knowledge
