= Academy Theater =

Academy Theater, Academy Theatre, Academy Cinema, or Academy Cinemas may refer to:

- Academy Cinema, Bristol, historic former movie theater
- Academy Cinemas (New Zealand), independent movie theatre in Auckland, New Zealand
- Academy Theatre (Inglewood, California), historic former movie theater
- Academy Theater (Portland, Oregon), historic movie theater
- Academy Theatre (TV show), American anthology show in 1949
- Brixton Academy, historic former movie and live theater
- Holly Cinema, formerly Academy Theater, Hollywood, California
- Regency Academy Cinemas, historic movie theater in Pasadena, California
