= Elsie Cohen =

Dutch-born British art cinema manager

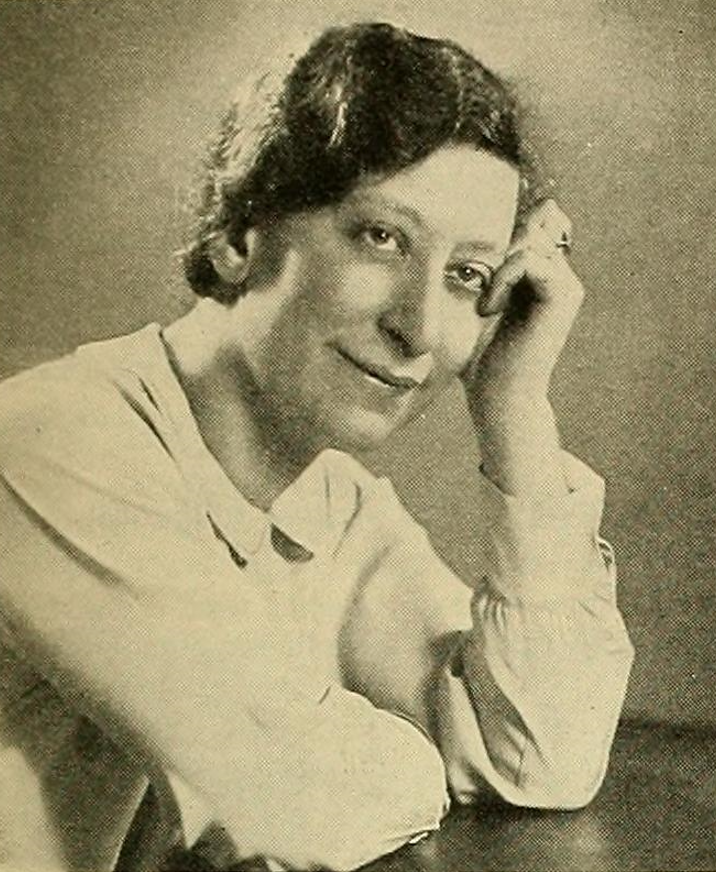
- Born: Elsa Cohn; 14 June 1895; Amsterdam
- Died: 26 January 1972 (aged 76); Saltdean
- Other names: Elsie Cohen, Elsie Kellner
- Known for: Starting art-cinema in the UK
- Spouse(s): Endre, or Andrew, Kellner

Elsie Coh(e)n (later Elsie Kellner; 14 June 1895 – 26 January 1972) was a Dutch-born Polish Jew who became a naturalised Briton in 1925. She worked in film journalism, publicity and sales before managing some of the first art cinemas in the UK. She was most notable for her period in charge of The Academy cinema in Oxford Street 1931-1940.

== Early life ==
Cohen was born Elsa Cohn in Amsterdam in 1895, the daughter of Polish-Jews Joseph and Jenny Cohn. The family moved to London by 1898. She is said to have been educated at Queens College, London.

== Career ==
She entered the cinema industry as a journalist in 1915 when she joined British film journal Kinematograph Weekly as junior subeditor. She changed her name around this time to Elsie Cohen. She became greatly interested in cinema as an art form especially when she interviewed D. W. Griffith for Kinematograph Weekly in 1917. He was publicising his feature-length silent film Intolerance. She was promoted to associate editor the same year while also serving as film critic and fashion writer for weekly newspaper The National News. In 1919 she became associate editor of British film journal Pictures and Picturegoer.

In 1919 she became publicity manager and foreign sales manager for British-Dutch film company Anglo-Hollandia, managed by Maurits Binger. She promoted the company's films to overseas film journalists and edited the Anglo-Hollandia News. She took six of the company's films to the USA and gained an American distribution deal with Producers Security Corporation. She also purchased the rights to H. C. McNeile's Bulldog Drummond stories for the huge sum of £5,000. She also had bit parts in two Anglo-Hollandia films, Kitty Tailleur (1921) and Sister Brown (1921). She took over the company when Binger died in 1923, but Dutch bankers did not like the idea of a young woman running the business and chose instead to close down the company. She worked for a time at UFA studios in Germany before returning to the UK to be a floor manager for the Ideal Film Company in 1928.

== Cinema management ==
In 1930 she learned that the Palais de Luxe cinema in the West End was to be remodelled to create the Windmill Theatre. She rented the cinema for six months before building took place, screening recent American, Russian and German films. In 1931 she teamed up with exhibitor Eric Hakim whose company Cinema House Ltd had purchased the Picture House cinema in London's Oxford Street. Rival art film exhibitor Stuart Davis had approached Eric Hakim, the owner of the Picture House, but Hakim wanted too big a rent. Cohen persuaded Hakim to let her manage the cinema, and it opened as The Academy in March 1931.

Under Cohen's management the Academy became London's premier location for the exhibition of art films. Many films that are now recognised as classics were first shown in Britain at the Academy, including Kameradschaft, Mädchen in Uniform, La Grande Illusion, Le Quai des Brumes and La Règle du Jeu. Critics, politicians, royalty and ordinary film lovers came to the Academy, whose premieres became major social events. Cohen ensured that all foreign films had subtitles, developed an educational programme, and provided support for film societies and filmmakers. In 1931 Hakim leased another London cinema, the Cambridge Theatre, which Cohen also managed, and in 1932 the Cinema House Theatre, in Oxford Street, which she also managed. Cohen also managed the Leeds Academy Cinema which opened in 1933 and lasted two year, the only one of a planned network of regional Academies to see the light of day.

Hakim became bankrupt in 1934 and a new company took over ownership of The Academy in 1937, Academy Cinema Ltd, with Cohen remaining as manager. She took on Austrian film director George Hoellering as her deputy. Together they expanded operations to include specialist film distributor Unity Films. Plans to move into film production and to launch regional Academies were halted by the start of World War II. The Academy was closed after bomb damage in October 1940. Cohen joined the Entertainments National Service Association as manager of its Overseas Recorded Broadcasting Service (ORBS), making and distributing entertainment recordings for British forces overseas. The Academy re-opened in March 1944, but Cohen found that she had been forced out, with Hoellering replacing her as manager. She remained with the ORBS until 1948, worked for a time at a commercial sound studio, then left the audiovisual industry.

== Personal life ==
Cohen married a Hungarian homeopathic doctor named Endre (or Andrew) Kellner in 1933. They divorced in 1936. There were no children.

Cohen died at her home in Saltdean in 1972 after a long illness.

== Legacy ==
The sculptor Ronald Moody created a bust of Cohen in 1934-1936. It is held in the National Portrait Gallery in London.

== Sources ==
- Coxhead, E. (June 1933). "Towards a co-operative cinema: The Work of the Academy, Oxford Street". Close Up. X (2). London: Pool Group: 135.
- McKernan, Luke (2024). "Elsie Cohen". Women Film Pioneers Project.
- Paul, Rotha (1999). Kruger, Robert; Petrie, Duncan J. (eds.). A Paul Rotha Reader. Exeter studies in film history. University of Exeter Press. ISBN 9780859896269.
