= Ella Donovan =

British communist activist and organizer

Ella Donovan was a prominent figure and a full-time organiser in the Stepney Tenants Defence League, a Communist-led grassroots organisation that organised rent strikes in the 1930s. She taught tenants how to organise, determine their legal rights and collectively fight landlords.

== Biography ==
The Stepney Tenants’ Defence League was organised by the Communist Party and women chaired most of the tenants’ committees formed in tenement blocks, organised opposition to attempted evictions attempts, and even demonstrated in the West End of London to highlight the plight of east London slum-dwellers. In 1938 the decontrol of much housing in the area and proposed rent increases of up to 40% led to STDL becoming even more active, and Ella Donovan, the wife of an unemployed hall porter, became a full-time organizer. This was a time when women who previously had not been engaged in activism, ‘lost their fear of the landlord and learnt their own organized power’ in Ella's own words.

By the end of January 1939, the STDL had four central officers and 10 local committees, and could count on nearly 5000 affiliated members. By the end of February, the STDL had recovered £10,000 in overcharged rents and had won rent reductions totalling £18,000. It had also forced landlords to carry out numerous repairs.

The historian Sarah Glynn highlights the importance of these strikes which: “proved the determination of the women, who bore the brunt of these struggles and sometimes found themselves picketing through weeks of winter cold.”

Noreen Branson notes "It was the women who did the picketing, women who often dominated the committees making up the Stepney Tenants’ Defence League, women who came out on demonstrations. It was, of course, partly because the men were at work, and the women were at home where the action was taking place." Despite their impressive political credentials as activists, the women prominent in the Stepney rent strikes did not reach the same heights of political office as the men.

== See also ==
- Bertha Sokoloff
- John Groser
