= Ernst Angel =

Austrian writer

Ernst Angel (11 August 1894 in Vienna, Austria – 10 January 1986 in Newark, New Jersey) was an Austrian-born poet, theatre and film critic, screen play author, film director and publisher who later became a psychologist. He was Jewish.

For a period of time, he worked with Rollo May, co-authoring a book.

He died in Newark Airport.

== Publications in psychology ==
- Rollo May, Ernest Angel & Henry F. Ellenberger (Hg.): Existence: A new dimension in Psychiatry and Psychology. New York: Basic Book, 1958. New edition 1994 with Jason Aronson Publishers, Lanham, MD (the USA); ISBN 1-56821-271-2.

Ernest Angel, Ph.D. was vice-president of the National Psychological Association for Psychoanalysis (NPAP) for many years. He escaped the Nazi concentration camps but many of his family members died. He told one of his students in supervision that he witnessed a prisoner in the camp being shot in the head directly in front of him. He confided that he would pretend to be invisible as a defense mechanism to the horrible conditions around him. After the war, he became a book editor in Berlin. After reading the works of Binswanger and Boss dealing with existential issues, he went to his supervisor and said that they should publish a book on existentialism. His publisher told him to find an authority who has written something on the subject. He went through " Dissertation Abstracts" and noticed that Rollo May wrote a dissertation on anxiety. He contacted him and that he told his student is how Rollo May became the " pope of existentialism." Ernest was more comfortable remaining a Freudian. Dr. Angel was always concerned with the world around him and especially the threat of nuclear buildups. He said that the younger generations introject these threats and lose their sense of having a destiny and live only for the moment. With this in mind, he started the " Union for Concerned Psychologists and Psychoanalysts" that later merged with an international medical union. Always a snappy dresser, he was a man of style. In 1984, he encouraged his student, Philip Ingenito, to write and produce the video, " How To Choose a Therapist". The video took a red ribbon at the American Film Awards and was voted one of the "top 25" films by the American Library Association in 1985.

== Selected filmography ==
- Love on Wheels (1932)
- Hunting You (1929)

== See also ==
- List of Austrian writers
