= Akademi Fantasi Indosiar =

- Based on: La Academia by Francel Diaz Lenero, Daniel Ortiz and TV Azteca
- Judges: Trie Utami (1–6); 2 Guest Judges each week
- Theme music composer: Aubrey Suwito
- Country of origin: Indonesia
- No. of seasons: 5

Production
- Running time: approximately 2 hours

Original release
- Network: Indosiar
- Release: 6 December 2003 – 9 September 2006

Akademi Fantasi Indosiar (commonly abbreviated as AFI) was Indonesia's second reality television show after Popstars Indonesia. In this show, contestants—referred to as "students"—competed for the winning title and a chance to launch their careers in the entertainment industry.

The first season premiered at the end of November 2003 and became one of Indosiar's highest-rated shows. The theme song, titled "Menuju Puncak," was identical to that used in Akademi Fantasia from Malaysia and was composed by Aubrey Suwito.

The show's format was adapted from La Academia, which originated in Mexico. Indonesia was the second country in Southeast Asia, after Malaysia, to produce its own version of the show, with a similar format later introduced in Thailand. Akademi Fantasi Indosiar was replaced by The Voice Indonesia (also broadcast on Indosiar) in 2013.

== Host ==
- Adi Nugroho (Season 1 – Season 5)
- Najib Ali Singapore presenter (Season 4)

== Judges ==
- Trie Utami – musician, composer, sound engineer, and producer (Season 1–present)
- Hetty Koes Endang – multi-genre singer (Season 1–present)
- Harry Roesli – musician, composer, singer, and music producer (Season 1–Season 3)
- Rieka Roeslan – musician, composer, singer, and music producer; former vocalist of The Groove (Season 4–present)
- Hedy Yunus – singer (Seasons 1 and 2)
- Melly Goeslaw – presenter (Season 3)
- Pongki Jikustik – vocalist of Jikustik (Season 4)

== Seasons ==
Season	Winner	Runner-up	Third	Other Contestants (In Order of Elimination)
AFI 1	Very Affandi	Petrus Kia Suban	Mawar Dhimas Febra Purwanti	Sifera Dewi Nazarina; Rini Astuti; Dicky Hariadi; Romy; Melissa Felicia Wuwungan; Ismail Rojali; Yenny Rizkyanti; Herawati; Dewi Lastmi
AFI 2	Theodora Meilani Setyawati	Haikal Nasution	Micky Octapatika	Nia Kartika Putri; Cindy Carolina Sibarani; R. Setya Adi Dharma; Aditya Putra Widjaya; Pasha Dina Widjaya Sihombing; Febriane Nur Permata Rindu; Ratna Yulia Nining; Amalia Soraya; Jovita Indah Puspitasari
AFI 3	Putu Sutha Natawijaya	Alvin Kurniawan	Edwin Haluoleo Agus Mokodompit	Eky Renata; Dessy Febianti; Randy Larry Heratta; Adinda Intan Permatasari; Lestari Utami; Yuke Elvandari; Jelita Novalintina Tobing; Shelly Puspita
AFI 4 called AFI 2005	Ade Alfonso Pattihahuwan	Indri Tribuana Sunarhatie	Jissindo Beaugeste "Bojes"	Prastiwi Dwiarti; Luri Dini Ayu Safitri; Purnawan Anjar Kusumo Booedojo; Rizwar Rizali; Kartika Yudia Ramlan; Fibri Hening MAM; Yongki Dri Atmoko; I Dewa Ayu Anggie Santi Lestari; Arjuna Prima Iskandar
AFI 5 called AFI 2006	Tri Widi Nugroho	Andi Nugroho	Mega Dirilla	Arif Taufan; Marina Wolayan; Hendrizal; Rita Elizabeth Tomasoa; Maolyza Oktavianus; Luh Paramita Ardianthi; Takaeda; Herry Ansyar "Anca"; Vindra Artha Kusuma

== Show format ==
AFI is headed by a school principal. Each season consists of one prime concert, nine elimination concerts, one E-Club concert (known as the Elimination Club in seasons 1–4 and as Wildcard in season 5), one Road to Grand Final concert (in seasons 4 and 5), one Grand Final concert, and one Inauguration concert. In every concert, the academics are evaluated by three commentators—one permanent and two guest commentators. Each season features 12 academics who are housed in a dormitory where they receive training in singing, dancing, acting, English, and other related skills. The champions receive cash prizes, tour packages, and a luxury car. After the Inauguration concert, the academics proceed directly to the recording studio to produce a compilation album, a collaboration between Indosiar and Sony Music Indonesia.

The AFI voting system operates via SMS and premium call, with the academic receiving the fewest votes being eliminated each week.

- Diary AFI: This segment features the daily lives of the academics in the dormitory. It airs every Monday through Friday in seasons 1–4 and Tuesday through Saturday in season 5.
- Backstage Concert: This segment showcases behind-the-scenes preparations as the academics travel from the dormitory to the concert venues. It airs every Saturday in seasons 1–3 and every Sunday in seasons 4–5.
- Concert AFI: This segment presents the academics' best performances. It airs every Saturday in seasons 1–3 and every Sunday in seasons 4–5.
- Flashback Concert: This segment offers flashbacks of previous AFI concerts. It airs every Sunday in seasons 1–3 and every Monday in seasons 4–5.
- Close Up and Personal: This segment provides profiles of the academics and is broadcast during the final episode of each season.

== Programme history ==
In 2003, the Indonesian television landscape was dominated by soap operas, with talent search shows being relatively scarce. In a creative move at the end of 2003, Indosiar acquired the broadcasting rights for Akademi Fantasia from Malaysia (aired on Astro Ria) and La Academia from Mexico (aired on TV Azteca). AFI emerged as a talent search event that popularized reality television in Indonesia. Auditions were held in four major cities—Medan, Jakarta, Bandung, and Surabaya—resulting in the selection of 12 academics to compete. The show aimed to produce a winner who would succeed in the Indonesian music industry. With weekly concerts and audience participation determining which academic would be eliminated, the program offered a fresh approach to talent search events at the time.

AFI featured a variety of attractions that kept audiences engaged, including the theme song "Menuju Puncak" with its distinctive choreography, emotionally charged elimination moments, transparent SMS polls and premium call systems, and the drama of life in the AFI dormitory. The event won an award at the Panasonic Awards in 2004 and received nominations in 2005 and 2006. AFI left a lasting impact on Indonesian television; in 2013, NET—a new private television channel—featured the "Menuju Puncak" choreography during its launch event. AFI is remembered as one of the most phenomenal television events in Indonesia and is celebrated for its transparent SMS polling system.

== Season synopsis ==
=== Season 1 (2003–2004) ===
In the first season, Indosiar and the AFI judges selected candidates—referred to as "academics"—from four major cities in Indonesia: Jakarta, Bandung, Surabaya, and Medan. Auditions were held in these cities, attracting thousands of participants. Ultimately, 12 individuals were chosen to undergo approximately 90 days of training in Jakarta under the guidance of professional lecturers.

In early December 2003, the 12 AFI academics were introduced through two non-elimination concerts. The first elimination concert was held at the end of December, utilizing an SMS and premium call scoring system. After nine weeks of elimination rounds, the season concluded with Veri Afandi—an audition finalist from Medan—winning the title by securing over 42% of the SMS votes in the Grand Final, thereby surpassing Kia Suban and Mawar Febra.

Veri's unexpected victory, particularly after early rounds that favored contestants such as Mawar and Dicky, led many to attribute his win to his popularity and a personal story that resonated strongly with viewers, especially mothers. Despite strong performances by Mawar and Kia during the Grand Final, Veri's surge in SMS votes—beginning around the seventh week—proved insurmountable.

==== Season 1 elimination chart ====
Top sms	Bottom sms	Eliminated

Stage:		Elimination Concert									
Week:		Elimination 1 (20 December 2003)	Elimination 2 (27 December 2003)	Elimination 3 (03 January 2004)	Elimination 4 (10 January 2004)	Elimination 5 (17 January 2004)	Elimination 6 (24 January 2004)	Elimination 7 (31 January 2004)	Elimination 8 (14 February 2004)	Elimination 9 (21 February 2004)	Grand Final (28 February 2004)
Position	Finalist	Result									
1	Veri Afandi							Top SMS	Top SMS	Top SMS	Winner
2	Kia Suban						Bottom 2				Runner-up 1
3	Mawar Febra	Top SMS	Top SMS	Top SMS	Top SMS	Top SMS		Bottom 2		Bottom 2	Runner-up 2
4	Ve Nazarina						Top SMS		Bottom 2	Elim	
5	Rini Astuti		Bottom 3			Bottom 3		Bottom 3	Elim		
6	Dicky Haryadi						Bottom 3	Elim			
7	Romi Kartiko				Bottom 3	Bottom 2	Elim				
8	Icha Wuwungan		Bottom 2	Bottom 2	Bottom 2	Elim					
9	Smile Rozali	Bottom 3		Bottom 3	Elim						
10	Yenny Rizkiyanti			Elim							
11	Herawati	Bottom 2	Elim								
12	Dewi Lastmi	Elim									

=== Season 2 (2004) ===
Following the success of the first season, Indosiar held a similar event titled Akademi Fantasi Indosiar 2 just one week after the conclusion of AFI 1. A key difference between AFI 2 and its predecessor was the selection process, which involved choosing 12 contestants who would then enter a quarantine phase.

After auditions were held in nine cities—Jakarta, Medan, Bandung, Semarang, Yogyakarta, and Surabaya—18 prospective contestants advanced to the next stage. From these, the final 12 were selected by Indosiar viewers through SMS and premium call polls during two Pre-Elimination Concerts.

In Pre-Elimination Concert 1, the selected contestants were Micky and Cindy from Jakarta, Rindu and Lia from Bandung, and Pasha and Haikal from Medan. Among those eliminated during this concert was a Jakarta candidate, Purie Andriani, who later became known as Purie Mahadewi. The following week, during Pre-Elimination Concert 2, Tia and Nana from Semarang, Adit and Nia from Surabaya, and Adi and Jovita from Yogyakarta were selected.

After nine Elimination Concerts, the season was won by Tia from Semarang. Consistently receiving positive comments from the judges, Tia delivered some of her best performances with songs such as "My All" (Mariah Carey), "Tak Ku Duga" (Ruth Sahanaya), "Bring Me to Life" (Evanescence), and "Pengabdian Cinta" (Krisdayanti). In the Grand Final, held on 19 June 2004, Tia secured 42% of the vote, defeating Haikal and Micky. The Grand Final of AFI 2 became one of the most popular television events of its time, achieving high ratings.

==== Season 2 elimination chart ====
Top sms	Bottom sms	Eliminated

Stage:		Pre Elimination		Elimination Concert									
Week:		Group 1 (13 March 2004)	Group 2 (20 March 2004)	Elimination 1 (10 April 2004)	Elimination 2 (17 April 2004)	Elimination 3 (24 April 2004)	Elimination 4 (01 May 2004)	Elimination 5 (08 May 2004)	Elimination 6 (15 May 2004)	Elimination 7 (22 May 2004)	Elimination 8 (05 June 2004)	Elimination 9 (12 June 2004)	Grand Final (19 June 2004)
Position	Finalist	Result											
1	Theodora Meilani Setyawati (Tia)		Top SMS	Top SMS	Top SMS		Top SMS			Top SMS	Top SMS	Top SMS	Winner
2	Haikal Nasution	2nd SMS			8			Top SMS	Top SMS		Bottom 2		Runner-up 1
3	Micky Octapatika	Top SMS			6	Top SMS						Bottom 2	Runner-up 2
4	Nia Kartika Putri		2nd SMS		2					Bottom 3		Elim	
5	Cindy Carolina Sibarani	2nd SMS			5		Bottom 3	Bottom 3	Bottom 2	Bottom 2	Elim		
6	R. Setia Adi Darma		Top SMS		Bottom 2		Bottom 2	Bottom 2	Bottom 3	Elim			
7	Aditya Wijaya (Adit)		Top SMS		Bottom 3				Elim				
8	Pasha Dina Widjaya Sihombing	Top SMS		Bottom 3	3	Bottom 2		Elim					
9	Rindu Febiane Nur Permata	Top SMS			7	Bottom 3	Elim						
10	Nana Yulia Nining Kusumawati		2nd SMS	Bottom 2	4	Elim							
11	Amalia Soraya	2nd SMS			Elim								
12	Jovita Dwi Indah Puspitasari		2nd SMS	Elim									
13–18	Yudhistira Adi Permana		Elim										
13–18	Vedita Ratih Dewayani		Elim										
13–18	Lola Anastasia Frans		Elim										
13–18	Bastian Elmori Tobing	Elim											
13–18	Purie Andriani	Elim											
13–18	Nining Wahyuni	Elim											

=== Season 3 (2004) ===
In AFI 3, three additional audition cities—Denpasar, Makassar, and Palembang—were included in the screening process. To determine the top 12 contestants (academics), three representatives from each audition city were selected through three pre-elimination concerts. Under the judgment of Trie Utami, Tamam Hosein, and the late Harry Roesli, one representative from each audition city was chosen. The top nine contestants were:

- Pre-Elimination Concert 1: INTAN (Jakarta) and RANDY (Makassar)
- Pre-Elimination Concert 2: DESY (Medan), SUTHA (Denpasar), and EKY (Surabaya)
- Pre-Elimination Concert 3: RIFKY (Semarang), TARI (Bandung), YUKE (Palembang), and SHELLY (Yogyakarta)

To complete the top 12, three additional finalists were selected as wild cards by the jury from among the candidates who had not initially qualified. These wild cards were LEO (Makassar), ALVIN (Yogyakarta), and JELITA (Jakarta).

AFI 3 set three new records in the history of the show. The first record was achieved when the Grand Final featured an all-male lineup after the only remaining female finalist, Eky, was eliminated at the final four stage. The second record was set by the extremely narrow margin in the Grand Final SMS vote—Putu Sutha Natawijaya (commonly known as Sutha) won with 38.61% of the votes, followed by Alvin Kurniawan with 38.57%, a difference of just 0.04%. The third record was established when Sutha became the youngest AFI winner at the age of 18.

==== Season 3 elimination chart ====
Top SMS	Bottom SMS	Eliminated

Stage:		Konser Elimination									
Week:		Elimination 1 (July 31, 2004)	Elimination 2 (07/08/2004)	Elimination 3 (August 14, 2004)	Elimination 4 (August 21, 2004)	Elimination 5 (August 28, 2004)	Elimination 6 (04/09/2004)	Elimination 7 (11/09/2004)	Elimination 8 (September 18, 2004)	Elimination 9 (September 25, 2004)	Grand Final (09/10/2004)
Position	Finalist	Hasil									
1	Putu Sutha Natawijaya		Top SMS		Top SMS					Top SMS	Winner
2	Alvin Kurniawan			Top SMS		Top SMS	Btm 3	Top SMS	Top SMS		Runner-up 1
3	Leo Mokodompit	Top SMS								Btm 2	Runner-up 2
4	Eky Renata							Btm 3	Btm 2	Elim	
5	Rifky Adi Prakoso	Btm 2	Btm 2	Btm 3	Btm 3	Btm 3	Top SMS	Btm 2	Elim		
6	Desy Febrianti		Btm 3	Btm 2		Btm 2	Btm 2	Elim			
7	Randy Larry Rehatta						Elim				
8	Intan Permatasari				Btm 2	Elim					
9	Lestari Utami				Elim						
10	Yuke Elvandari			Elim							
11	Jelita Novalentina Tobing	Btm 3	Elim								
12	Shelly Puspitasari	Elim									

=== Season 4 (2005) ===
In the fourth season, the show abandoned numerical titles in favor of using the year, so this installment became widely known as AFI 2005. This season is arguably credited with revitalizing the franchise after a slight ratings decline in the third season due to audience saturation. In AFI 2005 the ratings rebounded as the show introduced a revamped voting and selection process.

==== Auditions and selection process ====
Auditions for AFI 2005 were held in 11 major cities across Indonesia. To gain entry into the AFI dormitory, contestants were required to participate in a selection concert during which they were divided into two groups—the Hip and Hop groups. Voting was conducted via SMS and premium calls. Notably, during the Hip Hop concert, the representatives from Medan and Palembang—Nonie and Marissa—were eliminated; Marissa was eliminated during the Hip group selection, while Nonie was eliminated during the selection of the top six in the Hop group.

Ultimately, the final 12 contestants selected were:

- BOJES (Jakarta)
- TIKA and TIWI (Bandung)
- FIBRI (Semarang)
- YONGKI and ANJAR (Yogyakarta)
- LURI (Surabaya)
- DEWA (Denpasar)
- INDRI and ARJUNA (Makassar)
- RIZWAR (Banjarmasin)
- ADE (Manado)

AFI 2005 was widely regarded as the youngest and freshest version of the show.

==== Top 12 contestants ====
- Ade Alfonso Pattihahuwan (Ade) – 24, Manado – Winner
- Indri Suhantrie Tribuana (Indri) – 20, Makassar – Runner-up (September 3, 2005)
- Jisindo Beagutes (Bojes) – 19, Jakarta – Voted off (August 28, 2005)
- Y. Purnawan Anjar Kusumo Boedojo (Anjar) – 19, Yogyakarta – Voted off (August 21, 2005)
- Luri Dini Ayu Pratiwi (Luri) – 20, Surabaya – Voted off (August 14, 2005)
- Prastiwi Dwiarti (Tiwi) – 19, Bandung – Voted off (July 24, 2005)
- Rizwar Rizali (Rizwar) – 25, Banjarmasin – Voted off (July 17, 2005)
- Kartika Yudhia Ramlan (Tika) – 19, Bandung – Voted off (July 10, 2005)
- Fibri Hening M.A.M (Fibri) – 20, Semarang – Voted off (July 3, 2005)
- Warigit Dri Atmoko (Yongki) – 25, Yogyakarta – Voted off (June 26, 2005)
- I Dewa Ayu Anggie Santi Lestari (Dewa) – 19, Denpasar – Voted off (June 19, 2005)
- Arjuna Prima Iskandar (Arjuna) – 20, Makassar – Voted off (June 12, 2005)

==== Eliminated contestants on the Hip Hop Concert Round ====
- Nonie Elza Muhardika (Nonie) – 19, Medan – Voted off (May 30, 2005)
- Justicia Seska Febe (Tisya) – 18, Manado – Voted off (May 29, 2005)
- Iwan Hartanto (Iwan) – 25, Surabaya – Voted off (May 23, 2005)
- Rika Indah Sari (Rika) – 21, Palembang – Voted off (May 22, 2005)
- Fauziah A.R. (Fauzi) – 18, Banjarmasin – Voted off (May 16, 2005)
- Benny Irawan (Benny) – 21, Jakarta – Voted off (May 15, 2005)
- Bunga Nada Apriliandis (Bunga) – 22, Semarang – Voted off (May 9, 2005)
- Aris Sanjaya (Ari) – 24, Denpasar – Voted off (May 8, 2005)
- Rafika Utami Putri (Fika) – 19, Lampung – Voted off (May 2, 2005)
- Marissa Natra (Marissa) – 19, Pekanbaru – Voted off (May 1, 2005)

==== Season 4 elimination chart ====
Top SMS	Bottom SMS	Eliminated

Stage:		HIP & HOP						Elimination Concert									
Week:		Grup^{1}	1 (01/05/2005-02/05/2005) ^{2}	2 (08/05/2005-09/05/2005) ^{3}	3 (15/05/2005-16/05/2005) ^{4}	4 (22/05/2005-23/05/2005) ^{5}	5 (29/05/2005-30/05/2005) ^{6}	Elimination 1 (12/06/2005)	Elimination 2 (June 19, 2005) ^{7}	Elimination 3 (June 26, 2005)	Elimination 4 (03/07/2005) ^{8}	Elimination 5 (10/07/2005)	Elimination 6 (July 17, 2005)	Elimination 7 (July 24, 2005)	Elimination 8 (August 14, 2005)	Elimination 9 (August 21, 2005)	Grand Final (03/09/2005)
Position	Finalist	Result															
1	Ade Alfonso Pattihahuan	HOP					Btm 2						Btm 2	Top SMS		Btm 2	Winner
2	Indri Sunarhatie Tribhuana	HOP				Top SMS	Btm 3	Top SMS	Btm 4			Btm 2	Top SMS	Btm 2		Top SMS	Runner-up 1
3	Bojes Jisindo Beaugeste	HOP	Top SMS	Top SMS								Btm 3			Btm 2		Runner-up 2
4	Purnawan Anjar Kusumo	HOP							Btm 3		Btm 3				Top SMS	Elim	
5	Luri Dhini Salfitri	HIP					Top 1		Btm 2	Btm 2			Btm 3	Btm 3	Elim		
6	Prastiwi Dwiarti	HOP		Btm 2			Top SMS					Top SMS		Elim			
7	Rizwar Rizali	HIP			Btm 2	Top SMS	Btm 3				Top SMS		Elim				
8	Kartika Yudia Ramlan	HIP	Top SMS	Top SMS	Top SMS	Btm 3		Btm 2	Top SMS	Top SMS	Btm 2	Elim					
9	Fibri Hening M.A.M	HIP								Btm 3	Elim						
10	Yongki Driatmoko	HIP				Btm 2				Elim							
11	Dewa Anggie Santi L.	HOP		Btm 3	Top SMS	Btm 3		Btm 3	Elim								
12	Arjuna Prima	HIP		Btm 2			Btm 2	Elim									
13–14	Justicia Tisha	HIP					Elim										
13–14	Nonie Elsa	HOP	Btm 2		Btm 2	Btm 2	Elim										
15–16	Rika Indah	HIP	Btm 3	Btm 3	Btm 3	Elim											
15–16	Iwan Kurniawan	HOP			Btm 3	Elim											
17–18	Benny	HIP	Btm 2		Elim												
17–18	Fauzia A.R	HOP			Elim												
19–20	Ari Sanjaya	HIP		Elim													
19–20	Bunga Nada	HOP	Btm 3	Elim													
21–22	Marissa	HIP	Elim														
21–22	Rafika Utami	HOP	Elim														

- ^{1} Many argue that competition in the HOP Group is more stringent than the HIP group. Names like Indri, Nonie, Ade who are considered the most qualified must be in the bottom 3 in week 5 of the HOP
- ^{2} HIP: Tika the highest SMS acquisition, Bottom 3 Rika, Benny & Marisa(ELIM). Trie Utami chose Marisa because she felt Marisa's pitch control was a mess
- HOP: Bojes the highest SMS acquisition, Bottom 3 Bunga, Nonie & Fika(ELIM). Trie Utami chose Fika because Fika appeared very flat
- ^{3}HIP: Tika the highest SMS acquisition, Bottom 3 Rika, Arjuna & Ari(ELIM). Trie Utami chose Ari because it was judged to be true throughout the song while singing Berhenti Berharap (Sheila On 7)
- HOP: Bojes the highest SMS acquisition, Bottom 3 Dewa, Tiwi & Bunga(ELIM). Trie Utami chooses Bunga because Bunga are not suitable for pop genres
- ^{4}HIP: Tika the highest SMS acquisition, Bottom 3 Rika, Rizwar & Benny(ELIM). Trie Utami chose Benny because throughout the song Puteri (Jamrud), Benny unconsciously took one note higher than the original
- HOP: Dewa the highest SMS acquisition, Bottom 3 Iwan, Nonie & Fauzi(ELIM). Trie Utami reluctantly chose Fauzi to save Nonie and Iwan
- ^{5}HIP: Rizwar the highest SMS acquisition, Bottom 3 Tika, Yongki& Rika(ELIM). Trie Utami chose Rika with the consideration that Rika was always in the bottom 3
- HOP: Indri the highest SMS acquisition, Bottom 3 Dewa, Nonie & Iwan(ELIM). Trie Utami reluctantly chose Iwan to save Nonie and Dewa
- ^{6}HIP: Luri the highest SMS acquisition, Bottom 3 Rizwar, Arjuna & Tisya(ELIM). Trie Utami reluctantly chose Tisya because Arjuna and Rizwar rated more character. Viewers actually predict Yongki in the bottom 3
- HOP: Tiwi the highest SMS acquisition, Bottom 3 Indri, Ade & Noni(ELIM). Trie Utami reluctantly chose Nonie to save Indri and Ade
- ^{7} Luri suddenly fainted after hearing the Fibri was eliminated, due to the shock of her relapsing heart disease.

=== Season 5 ===
The fifth season, titled Akademi Fantasi Indosiar 2006, was won by Widi. This season awarded the winner a trip to Las Vegas and the opportunity to meet Celine Dion.

==== Season 5 elimination chart ====
Safe first	Safe second	Eliminated

Stage:		Spectacular Show										
Week:		6/4	6/11	6/18	6/25	7/2	7/9	7/16	7/23	7/30	8/6	8/13
Place	Contestant	Result										
1	Tri Widi Nugroho											Winner
2	Mega Dirilla						Btm 3					Runner-up
3	Andi								Btm 3	Btm 2	Elim	
4	Rita Tomasoa							Btm 3	Btm 2	Elim		
5	Arin Waluyan	Btm 2	Btm 2	Btm 3	Btm 3	Btm 3		Btm 2	Elim			
6	Hendri		Btm 3	Btm 2		Btm 2	Btm 2	Elim				
7	Taufan						Elim					
8	Maolyza Oktavianus				Btm 2	Elim						
9	Dian				Elim							
10	Takeda			Elim								
11	Anca	Btm 3	Elim									
12	Vindra Artha Kusuma	Elim										

=== Season 6 ===
Indosiar had officially announced that the sixth season would return in 2013 after Ramadhan.

== International versions ==
- Malaysia: Akademi Fantasia
- Mexico: La Academia
- Central America: La Academia Centroamérica
- Thailand: Academy Fantasia
- United States: La academia USA
- Singapore: Academy Fantasia
