= Academy 1-2-3 (cinema) =

Coordinates: 51°30′56″N 00°08′16″W

The Academy was a cinema located at 161–7 Oxford Street, Westminster, London, England, at the junction with Poland Street. Films (in the shape of Hale's Tours of the World) were shown at the address from at least 1906, and it opened in January 1913 as the Picture House to show The Miracle, with the intention of becoming "the home of the world's most realistic films". The Picture House continued to show films throughout the 1920s.

It reopened in 1931 as the Academy, becoming London's pre-eminent art house cinema, and for over 50 years introduced British audiences to major films, beginning with auteurs such as Jean Renoir and Marcel Carné; in later years, the Academy largely established the reputations of Ingmar Bergman, Andrzej Wajda, Satyajit Ray, Jean-Luc Godard, Miklós Jancsó and others in Britain. The Academy's high standards were maintained by a succession of three managers: Elsie Cohen, George Hoellering, and Ivo Jarosy. The cinema was damaged during a bombing raid in 1940 and reopened in 1944.

The basement housed a ballroom from the early 1950s where the Marquee Club held jazz sessions from 1958 to 1964 with musicians such as Johnny Dankworth, Chris Barber, Alexis Korner, and Tubby Hayes. The Rolling Stones played their first gig there in 1962. The New Academy cinema expanded to two and then three screens in the 1960s to become the Academy 1-2-3, and closed in 1986 after operating almost continuously for 80 years.

== Cinema history ==
=== Previous occupiers ===
Mander Brothers, varnish and colour manufacturers of Wolverhampton until 1998, had a warehouse at 165 Oxford Street in 1884. In December 1901, a partnership between Henry Clarke of 165 Oxford Street, and three Mander brothers (including Sir Charles Tertius Mander) was dissolved when Clarke retired.

=== Hale's Tours ===
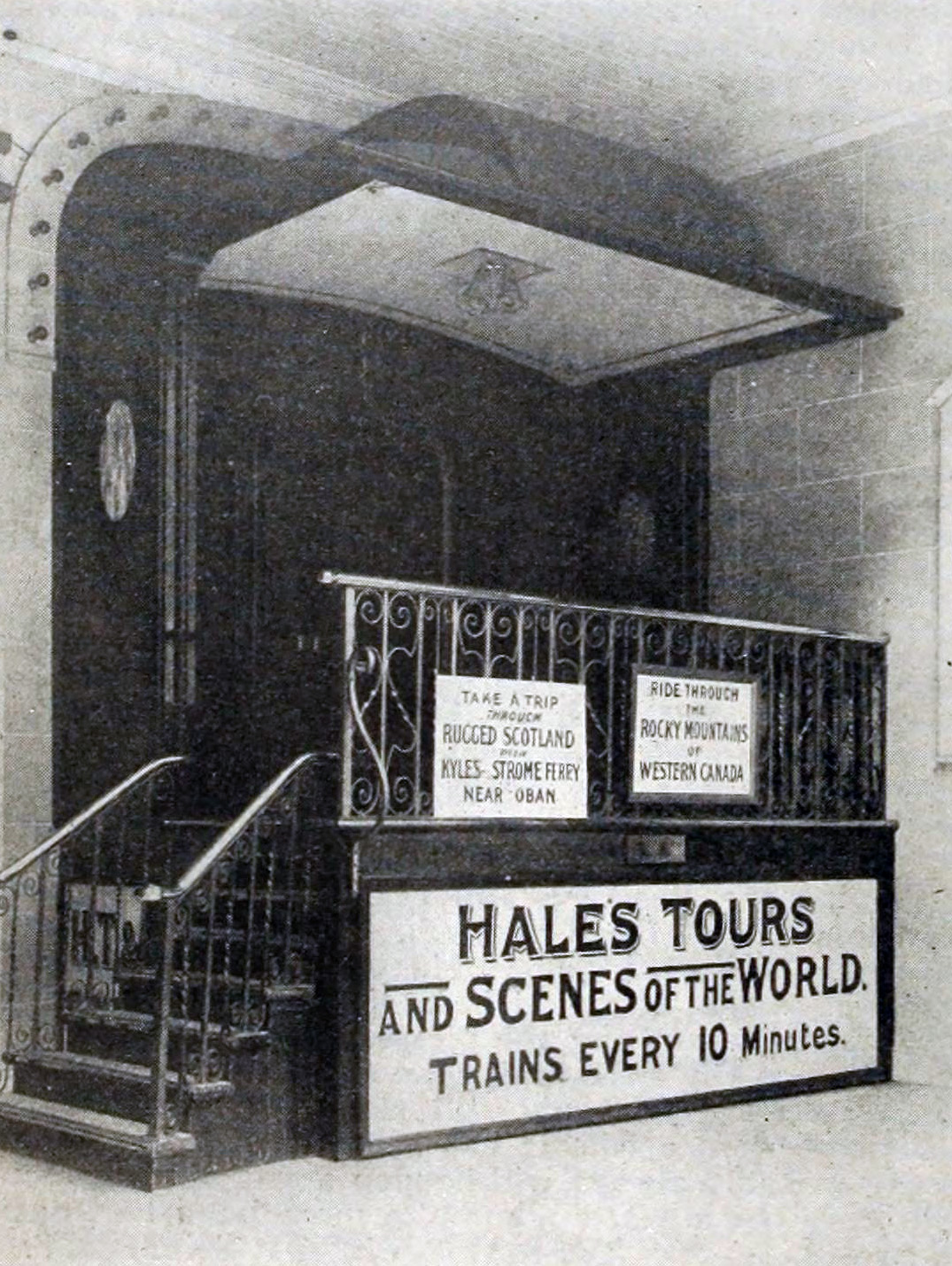
Entrance to a Hale's Tour

From at least 1906, the building housed a Hale's Tours of the World, one of London's first dedicated cinemas. This was an early virtual reality attraction (often found in fairgrounds etc.), in which a projected film played during a simulated ride in a railway carriage. The owner may have been the American film producer and director Charles Urban, who had a franchise for Hale's Tours with main offices selling films and equipment a few hundred yards away on Wardour Street. The business seems to have been in liquidation by 1906, when the franchise for Hale's Tours was acquired by J. Henry Iles, and a company named Hales Tours of the World Ltd. was set up in December of that year to take over the running of 165 Oxford Street.

=== J. Henry Iles and Joseph Menchen ===
Iles (who later owned Dreamland Margate) was a director of an Anglo-American syndicate, European Amusement Parks Ltd., which brought Luna Parks to Britain and Europe from around 1907. His business partners were Frank C. Bostock, a circus owner; H. C. McGarvie, an experienced showman "who probably had more experience in international expositions than any other living human being"; and McGarvie's business partner Joseph Menchen, who had been in the seaside and trolley park entertainment business since 1899. He had constructed cycloramas based on the Johnstown Flood of 1889, and furnished the complex electrical lighting effects for the 'Trip to the Moon' and other cycloramas at Coney Island.

=== The Picture House ===
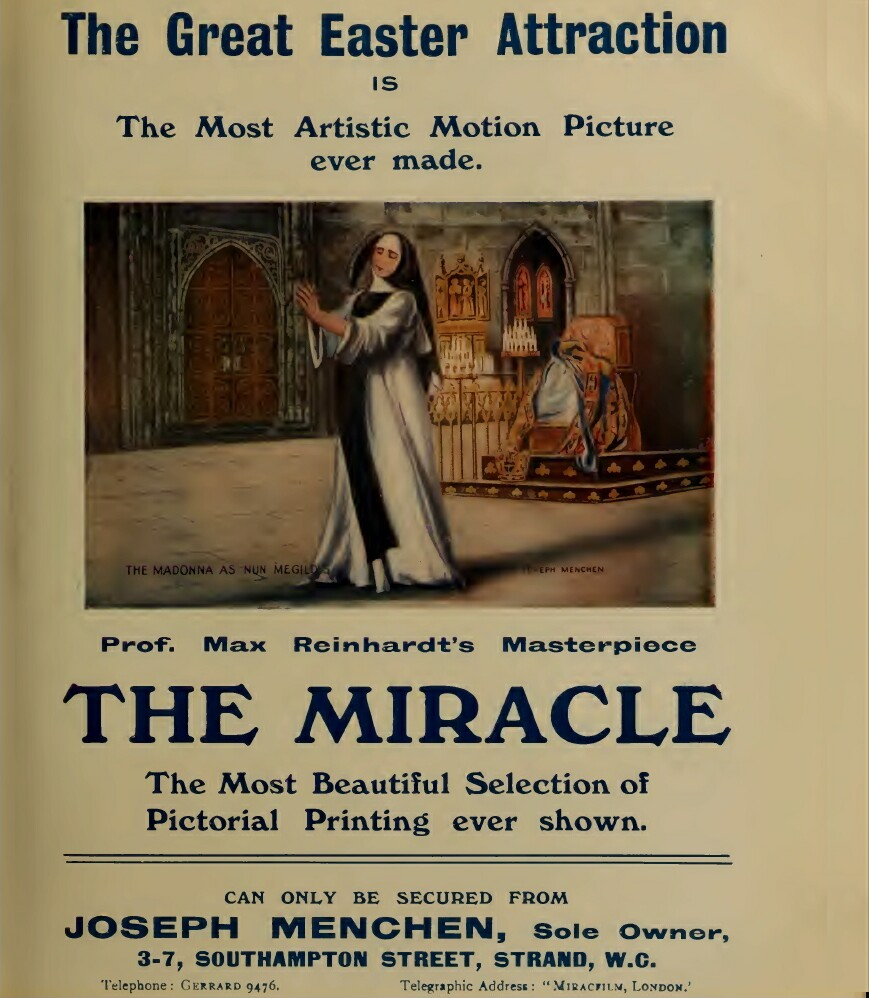
Trade press advertisement for The Miracle, March 1913

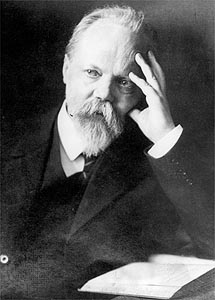
Engelbert Humperdinck, composer of the full-length orchestral and choral score of The Miracle

The premises were remodelled/rebuilt by the architects Gilbert & Constanduros (Note: Horace Gilbert & Stephanos Constanduros designed two cinemas operated by Montagu Pyke, the Piccadilly Cinematograph Theatre (later the Cannon Moulin) at 44 Great Windmill Street, and the Palace in Seven Sisters Road. One of their 'bijou mews' conversions was featured in Country Life. The partnership was dissolved in May 1924.)

The Picture House opened on Friday, 24 January 1913, as a semi-permanent home for the world's first full-colour feature film, The Miracle, produced as a personal project by Joseph Menchen.

On Friday last the Picture House, Oxford Street, opened its doors for the reproduction of that extremely successful play, "The Miracle", as performed at Olympia. As most of our readers may be aware, the Picture House is in Oxford Street, at the junction of Poland Street, and exactly opposite to that long neglected playhouse, the Princess's Theatre. One steps from the street down a mosaic pavement straight into the stalls, which are fitted with tip-ups, upholstered in canary silk. Here and there the walls, in cream and gold, are relieved with exquisitely panelled paintings of seventeenth century figures, while the lower part of the walls are of solid mahogany. Lights branching from old-world vases are dotted about, and high overhead is a huge electrolier, beyond the crystal beads of which gleam and glow 500 lamps, bathing the hall in a soft, warm light.

The circle — there is only one — is reached by a broad stairway of white and green marble, and there is never a pillar to obstruct the view. But even beyond an outward display science plays its part at the picture house, in that the heating and ventilating arrangements are on the most approved system, and fire is certainly considered to be next to impossible.

The aim is to make this theatre the home of the world's most realistic films, and the start made on Friday with those wonderful pictures of "The Miracle" straight from Covent Garden Theatre has undoubtedly given the place a good send off. As at Covent Garden, "The Miracle" at the Picture House is portrayed to the accompaniment of Professor Humperdinck's beautiful music, which is rendered by an orchestra and a choir both under the guidance of Mr. Sydney Freedom, who was the leader of the orchestra when Professor Rheinhardt [sic] produced the play at Olympia.

A special setting has been given to the picture by the erection of the convent and cathedral gates in uralite stone, (Note: Uralite was a building material similar to asbestos. See Middleton 1905, p. 393 [433]. Menchen was highly aware of the risk of fire in theatres and cinemas. See New York Dramatic Mirror, 17 September 1904, p. 8. A covering of uralite was applied to some Rolls-Royce Armoured Cars during World War 1 in the hope that it would absorb some of the impact of small arms fire. See Fletcher, David (2012). The Rolls-Royce Armoured Car. New Vanguard 189. Illustrated by Henry Morshead. Osprey Publishing. pp. 16, photo p. 13. ISBN 9781849085809.) extending across the entire circle. With its doors, steps, towers, and windows, this grey entrance, 60 feet wide and 45 feet high, looks as though it had been taken bodily from some mediaeval German city. That the popularity of this picture is by no means on the wane has been proved by the vast audiences which have thronged the Picture House since its opening with "The Miracle".

A company named 'The Picture House (Oxford-Street) Limited' was due to be wound up on 17 October 1915. Menchen returned to the USA in 1917.

The Picture House continued to show films through the 1920s: the programme for October 1926 included Lady Windermere's Fan with Ronald Colman; The Sea Beast with John Barrymore; Ralph Ince and the alluring Olive Borden in Yellow Fingers; and The Sea Urchin with Betty Balfour.

=== The Academy cinema ===
==== Eric Hakim ====
By 1929, the cinema at 165 Oxford Street had been bought or leased by Eric Hakim (1900–1967). His forebears were Armenian, and he came to England from France with 'a wealthy relative' (possibly his mother). In 1913, Hakim (aged 13) played at a gathering in Nice at the home of Claire Virenque, founder of the fr:Prix de littérature spiritualiste: "The virtuoso Eric Hakim played a fugue by Bach, and other old tunes; admirably accompanied by his mother, Mme Hakim, this young artist obtained the stunning success to which he is accustomed." (Note: Le Gaulois : littéraire et politique (in French), 20 April 1913, p. 2b. "Mme Virenque recevait, avant-hier, à la villa Soledad. L'après-midi fut charmante tour à tour, la musique et la poésie ravirent les amis de la gracieuse hôtesse. Le virtuose Eric Hakim joua une Fugue de Bach, et des airs anciens; admirablement accompagné par sa mère, Mme Hakim, ce jeune artiste obtint l'éclatant succès auquel il est habitué." Guests included Henri-Louis Chapon, the bishop of Nice, and the 'Princess Pascal de Bourbon'. The princess was a rich demi-mondaine who morganatically married Prince Pasquale, Count of Bari, half-brother of the ex-King of Naples. "He was the black sheep of his family, was involved in no end of unsavoury scrapes, and in 1878 disgraced himself by his marriage to a woman of the French half-world, who had styled herself "Mlle. Blanche de Mareonnay.")

He came to England and played as an orchestral violinist in cinemas run by the Davis brothers. Hakim may have modernised the Academy, which he owned by 1929, when he bemoaned the lot of the cinema owner (or exhibitor) during the transition from silent to sound films: "At the moment the renter is in the fortunate position of being able to hold the pistol at the head of the exhibitor because, not only is there a shortage of silent films, but also the exhibitor, having spent large sums of money in talking equipment, is forced to show talking films, which leaves the renter in the position of being able to dictate terms."

In 1931, Hakim directed the dubbing in English of the original German version of M which had played in US theatres with subtitles with little success. The dubbing was made in England, where Peter Lorre was one of the few original cast to be re-recorded in English. He went on to produce several films, the first two with his Eric Hakim Productions. The Outsider did well in the US, being shown by Metro-Goldwyn-Mayer in the US in its premier first-release circuit. Backed by the Rothschilds and with a 70% guarantee from MGM, he produced two more films both directed by Fred Niblo and starring Adolphe Menjou. With the first, Two White Arms, Hakim brought Margaret Bannerman into the talking era, and in 1932 he produced Diamond Cut Diamond (US:Blame the Woman). In 1932 he also produced The Temperance Fête, and The Crooked Lady, distributed by Metro-Goldwyn-Mayer with photography by Basil Emmott.

Hakim had hoped to secure the services of Fritz Kreisler to star in Passion Hunger, a story of a famous violinist and his amorous intrigues; but the deal fell through. He married Nina Vanna in September 1933, but was bankrupt by 1934 with declared liabilities of $195,000 and assets of $230. He remained legally bankrupt (although he had plenty of money) for at least 11 years with seven further petitions against him, and divorced Vanna after an affair with Norma Irene Zoe Plumby-Matthews ('Norma Dawn') in late 1945. (Note: The judge in the case, Sir Ernest Bruce Charles, made some disparaging remarks about the 24 year-old singer, to which she replied "I must go out, you're a wicked old man.")

==== 'Unusual films' ====
The Davis brothers owned a chain of 'Pavilion' cinemas in London. In April 1927, they sold them to the Gaumont British Theatres Ltd. circuit, with a contract which allowed them to show their own choice of films. Stuart Davis dedicated the 750-seat Avenue Pavilion at 101 Shaftesbury Avenue to 'continental' films and started the 'Unusual Film' movement, showing first German and Russian classics, then French avant-garde works by such as Man Ray. A number of showings were organised by The Film Society, whose supporters included H. G. Wells and George Bernard Shaw.

In 1929, Davies's contract with Gaumont expired and, at Davis' suggestion, Gaumont turned the remodelled Avenue Pavilion into London's first newsreel cinema. This left the Film Society without a permanent venue.

The highbrow literary film journal Close Up, published by the Pool Group from 1927 to 1933, played a significant part in promoting European and arthouse films.

==== Elsie Cohen ====
The Netherlands-born Elsie Cohen, who had worked on Dutch and German film productions, took over the Windmill Theatre for six months in 1929 and successfully put on a highbrow season of recent Russian and German films. Stuart Davis had already approached Eric Hakim, the owner of the Picture House, but Hakim wanted too big a rent. However, Elsie Cohen persuaded Hakim to let her manage the cinema, and it opened as The Academy in 1931 with Alexander Dovzhenko's Earth ('Zemlya'), one of the last silent films before the 'talkies' took over.

In order to encourage students and other film aficionados, a number of seats in the stalls were available at reduced prices.

==== Art-house cinema ====
A typical press advertisement in April 1932 announced G. W. Pabst’s "great epic of the mines" Kameradschaft; Mädchen in Uniform, Mutter Krausen, Road to Life, and Alone by Trauberg and Kozintsev.

The BFI was founded in 1933, and the moderne-style Curzon Cinema in Mayfair was built as a rival in 1934.

==== George Hoellering ====
George Hoellering was the director and producer of Hortobágy, a film about rural life in a Hungarian village of the same name. He arrived in Britain with the film (his main possession), his baby, and his wife in 1936. He had previously worked as production manager (with Robert Scharfenberg) for Kuhle Wampe, which had been shown by The Film Society at the Academy in 1933. Hortobágy was shown at the New Gallery Cinema by The Film Club; Cohen liked it, and he joined her as director of the Academy cinema in 1937. During World War II, a bomb badly damaged the Academy in 1940, and in the same year, Hoellering was interned as an enemy alien. The Academy reopened in 1944 with Hoellering as director, a position he held until his death in 1980. His right-hand man was his stepson Ivo Jarosy, who started as the Academy's publicist in 1938 and wrote carefully researched press releases. He worked closely with Peter Strausfeld (also interned with Hoellering on the Isle of Man) who created original linocut images for the Academy's distinctive posters since the cinema had a policy of not using any existing publicity material.

Apart from European features and avant-garde or experimental films, the Academy programmed a range of documentary films such as The Way We Live by Jill Craigie, and Children On Trial by Jack Lee (shown with Zéro de Conduite by Jean Vigo), and Herbert von Karajan conducting the St. Matthew Passion by J. S. Bach (1949). A film which showed at The Academy after the war could obtain up to 1,000 bookings across the country, although the British commercial film industry had been slow to embrace documentaries.

Hoellering was approached in 1965 by the writer and filmmaker Peter Whitehead, who was obsessed by Jean-Luc Godard's Alphaville and wanted to publish the screenplay. Although there was no script as such (since Godard had just worked from a 'treatment') Godard, through Hoellering, agreed for £200, and Whitehead reverse-engineered the screenplay by analysing and transcribing the whole film almost frame by frame. Whitehead made a number of music videos for the Rolling Stones in 1966 and 1967 (see below).

=== Academy 1-2-3 ===
The cinema re-opened as Academy One in May 1964, the smaller Academy Two started in March 1965, and Academy Three in April 1967 after some considerable strengthening and rebuilding in the basement. Hoellering died in 1980; the theatres closed permanently on 2 April 1986 and were demolished in 1989.

== Basement ==
=== Institute of Contemporary Arts ===
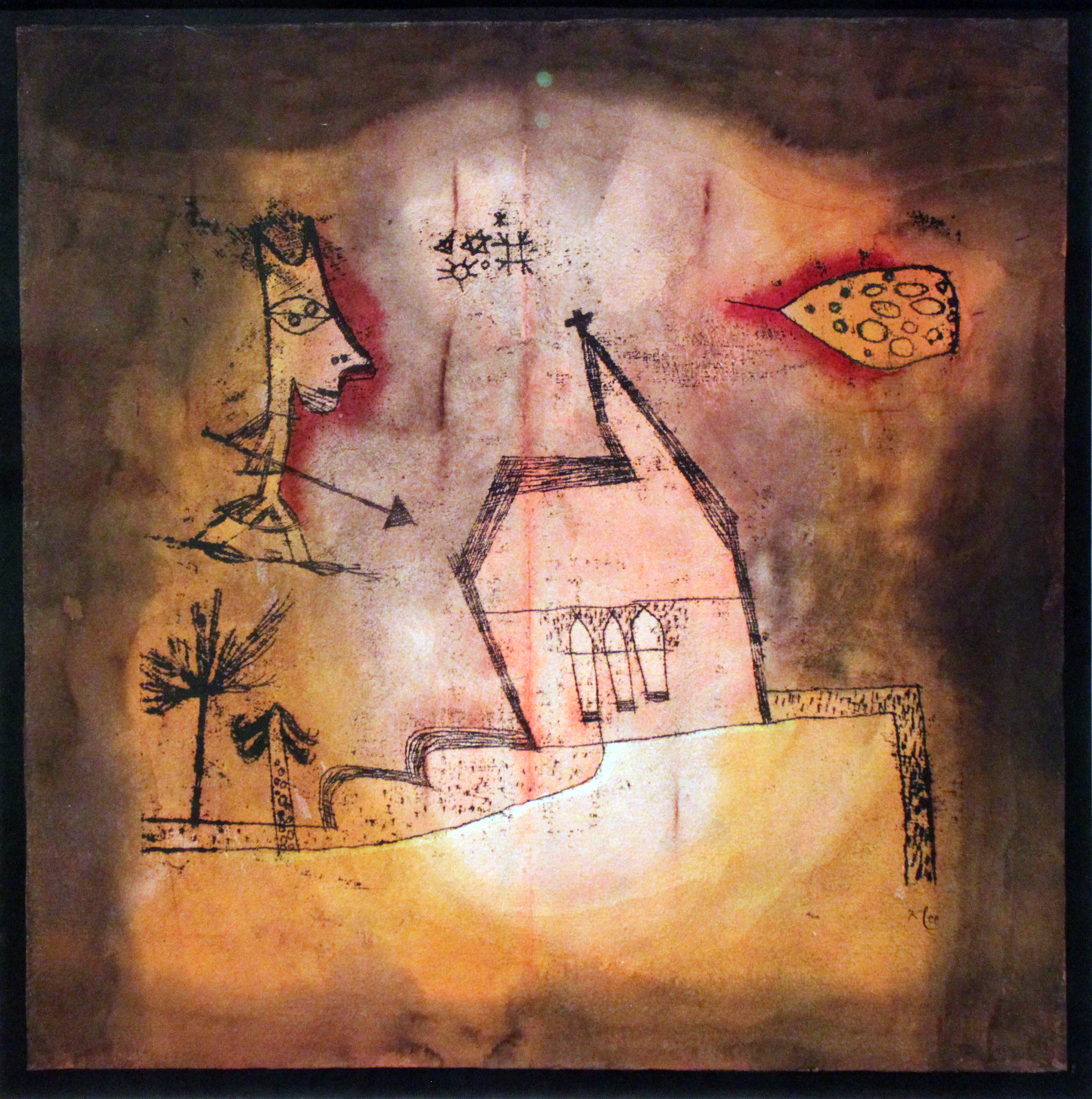
Bebende Kapelle ('Quaking Chapel') by Paul Klee, lent to the ICA's first exhibition in 1948 by Peter Watson (Note: Watson, talking once about Klee to Stephen Spender, said "that there was something that painters like Klee did which had never been done before, and this was to paint interior light shining outwards." Clark, Adrian. "The art collection of Peter Watson (1908–1956)" (PDF). The British Art Journal. XVI (2): 104 [4].)

In 1948, in order to remedy the lack of initiative shown by the Tate Gallery (and other institutions) in informing the British public about contemporary artistic movements, the ICA (with offices in Charlotte Street) mounted its first exhibition, 40 Years of Modern Art: a Selection from British Collections. The ICA signalled its new approach to the arts by choosing the basement of the Academy rather than an already sanctified ‘art space’. Organised by Roland Penrose, this groundbreaking exhibition opened on 9 (or 10) February 1948 and included works by Pierre Matisse, Pierre Bonnard, Pablo Picasso, Salvador Dalí, René Magritte and Vassily Kandinsky, as well as British contemporaries Francis Bacon, Eduardo Paolozzi, Victor Pasmore and Barbara Hepworth. (Note: The full alphabetical list of around 100 exhibitors (too long to reproduce here) essentially represents a Who's Who of Modernism since 1908, although André Derain's Pool of London dates from 1906.)

The poet and literary critic Herbert Read, co-founder of the ICA, wrote about the exhibition:

"Such is our ideal – not another museum, another bleak exhibition gallery, another classical building in which insulated and classified specimens of a culture are displayed for instruction, but an adult play-centre, a workshop where work is a joy, a source of vitality and daring experiment. We may be mocked for our naive idealism, but at least it will not be possible to say that an expiring civilisation perished without a creative protest."

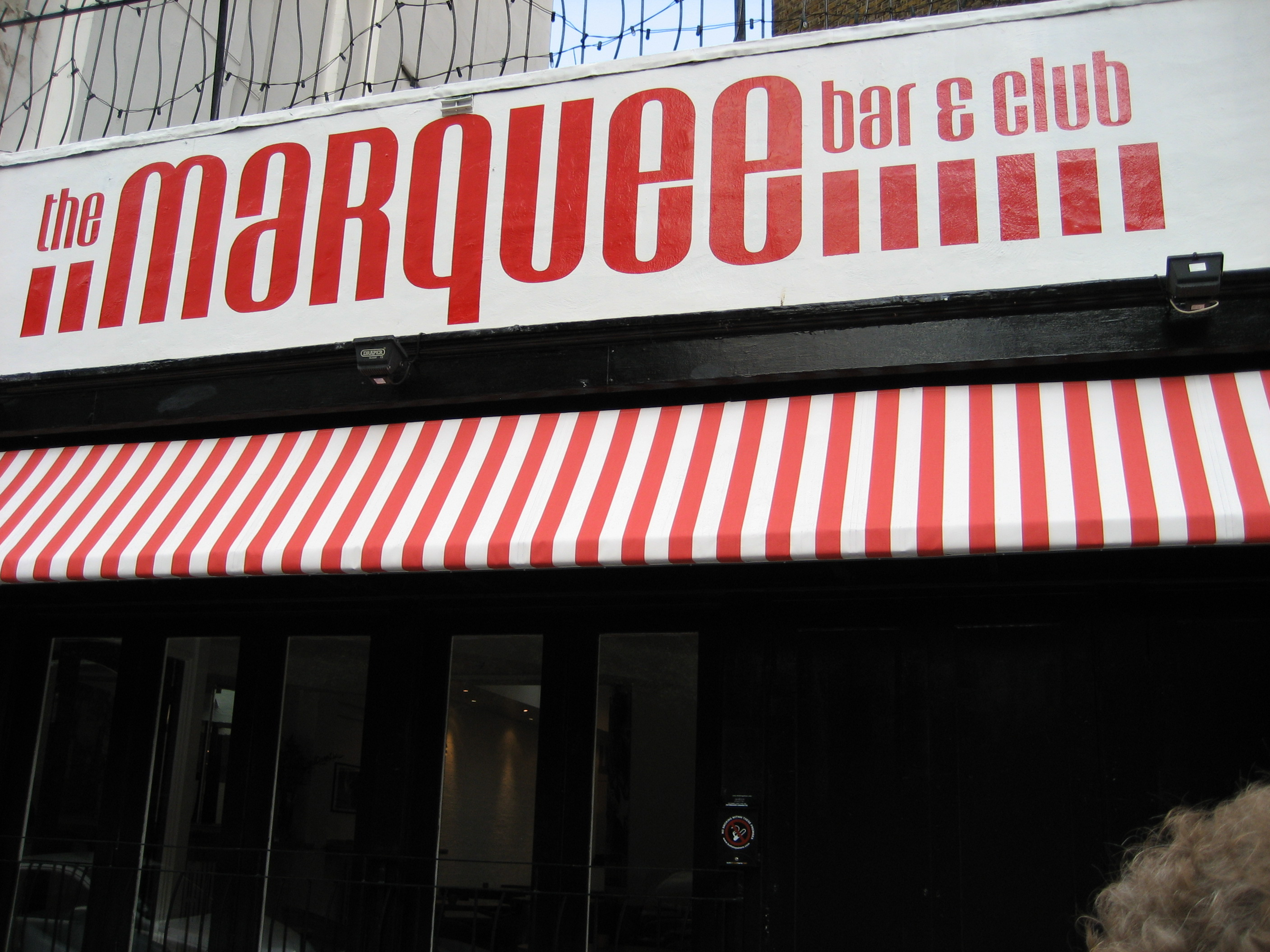
Awning over the entrance to the Marquee Club

By 1954, the writer John Berger could accuse the ICA of being "no more than a jazz club", since it had been organizing a series of historical introductory lectures to jazz; with the involvement of Elizabeth Lutyens and Eduardo Paolozzi jazz became part of the ICA culture; and even Melody Maker began advertising in the ICA's monthly bulletin.

The cinema closed permanently on 2 April 1986, with final screenings of the films Dangerous Moves, The Empty Table, and The Wanderer. The building was demolished in February 1989 and replaced by office and retail development, which was vacant for many years.

=== Marquee Club ===
The Marquee Club opened in the basement (previously the Marquee Ballroom) on 19 April 1958. The Rollin' Stones played their first gig there on 12 July 1962.

== See also ==
20 Frith Street
