= Church of St Michael and All Angels, Bromley-by-Bow =

Church in East London, England

Coordinates: 51.5163°N 0.0116°W

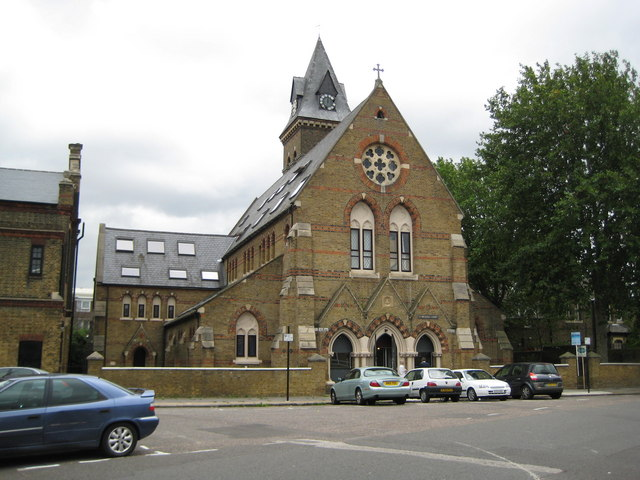
The church building in 2008

The Church of St Michael and All Angels was a church in Bromley-by-Bow, London. The Grade II listed 19th-century brick-built church was converted into flats in the 1980's, and is now known as St Michael's Court.

== History ==
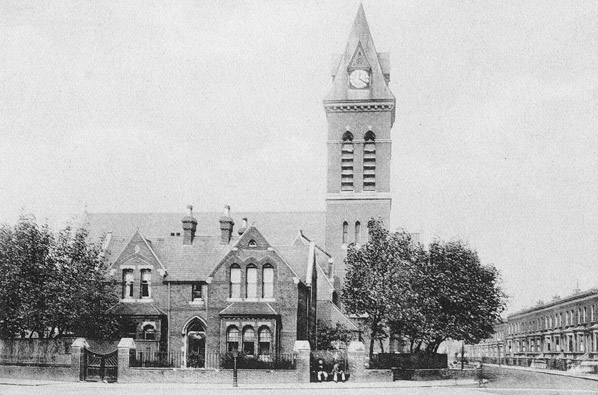
The church before 1930.

Originally, the site was occupied by a mission chapel run by Winchester College, built in 1861. The parish of St Michaels and All Angels was established as a daughter parish (sub-division) of the ancient parish of Bromley-by-Bow in 1861.

The church as it stands today was originally built in 1864–1865 by Reverend W. Morris. It was converted into flats in the 1980s.

In 1876, a communication was sent from the headmaster of Winchester College asking whether Rev. William Donne, M.A., of Brasenose College, Oxford, would be a suitable man to be appointed to the charge of the Winchester College mission in St Michael and All Angels. He was chosen to head the mission, and did so for five years, during which he built the church of All Hallows, at East India Docks.

The Revd Richard Enraght, religious controversialist, was the Curate of the church from 1884 to 1888.

== War memorial ==
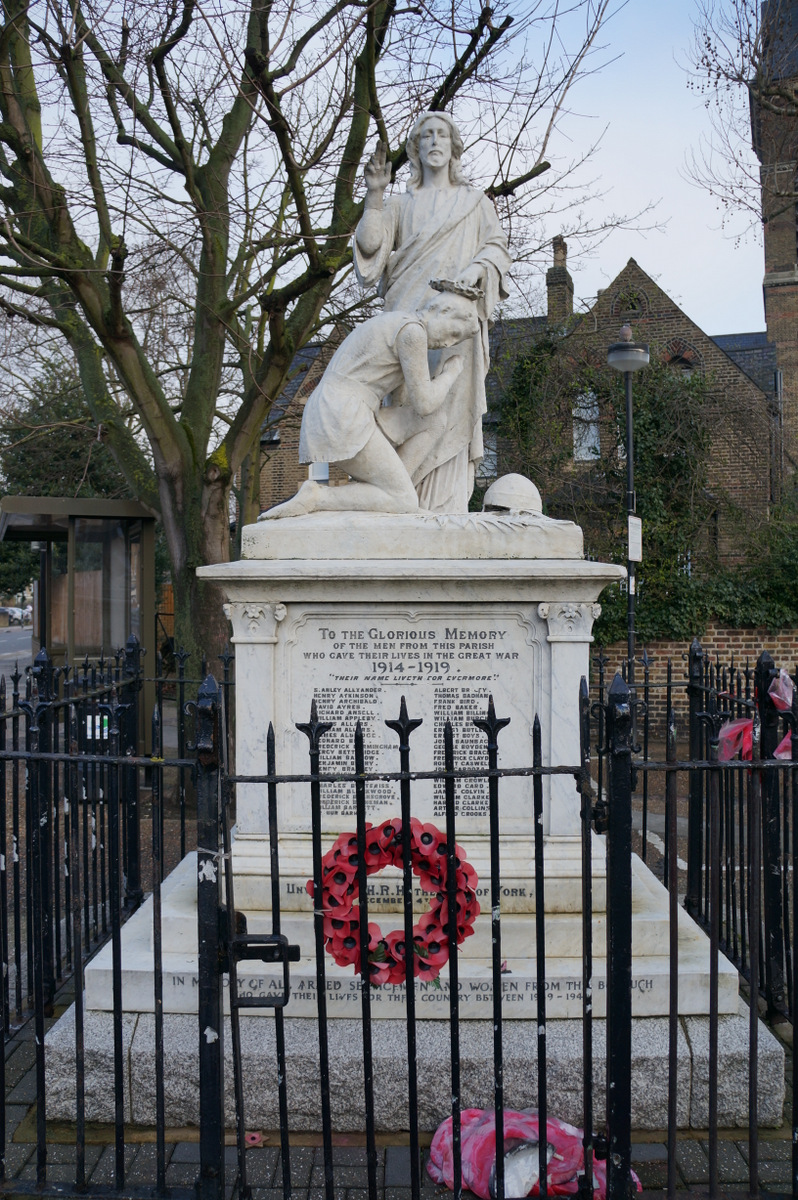
War memorial

The church has an adjacent war memorial, made from Cornish granite and sculpted by Mr A. R. Adams. The Imperial War Museum's archive describes the memorial as a "Figure of Christ with one hand raised in blessing and the other holding a wreath above the head of a kneeling warrior in the armour of a crusader. Names inscribed on the panels on the pedestal which is on three steps. Memorial is surrounded by low railings." The memorial was erected a short time after the First World War, and was unveiled by the future George VI (then Duke of York) on 4 December 1920, and dedicated in the same ceremony by Henry Mosley, Bishop of Stepney. Prior to this it was an open space, used for local community meetings. Occasionally, it was also host to fighting: the vicar's daughter in the late 1800s, Eileen Baillie, used to watch fights "in that convenient open space before the vicarage gates".

Money for the memorial – £900 – was raised via "an appeal, a football match and tickets for a special matinee performance at the queen's theatre, high street on Saturday 24 April 1920".
