= Accies (disambiguation) =

The Accies is a nickname for Hamilton Academical F.C.

Accies may also refer to:

== Rugby union ==
- Edinburgh Academical Football Club
- Glasgow Academicals RFC
- Omagh Academicals RFC
- Trinity Academicals RFC
- former nickname of Leith RFC

== Other uses ==
- Edinburgh Academical Cricket Club
- Hamilton Academical W.F.C.
