= Royal Academy (disambiguation) =

Royal Academy may refer to:

== Language and literature ==
- Real Academia Española ("Royal Spanish Academy" or "RAE"), the institution responsible for regulating the Spanish language
- Royal Academy of Dramatic Art, a British drama school
- Royal Academy of Dutch language and literature

== Civilian education ==
- Royal Academy of Turku, founded 1640, now the University of Helsinki
- Royal Irish Academy, one of Ireland's premier learned societies and cultural institutions
- Royal West of England Academy or RWA, an institution (founded 1844) based in Bristol, England, UK
- Mount Royal Academy (New Hampshire), a Roman Catholic high school
- Royal Academy of Cambodia, a Cambodian educational institution
- Irvine Royal Academy, Scottish educational institution
- Inverness Royal Academy, a Scottish educational institution
- Belfast Royal Academy, an educational institution

== Art and architecture ==
- Royal Danish Academy of Fine Arts, an art institution and group of art schools in Copenhagen, Denmark
- Royal Academy of Arts, also simply known as the Royal Academy (RA), an art institution (founded 1768) based in London, England, UK
- Royal Academy of Fine Arts Antwerp (Koninklijke Academie voor Schone Kunsten Antwerpen), an art and design academy based in Antwerp, Belgium
- Royal Academy of Fine Arts (Ghent), (founded 1741), in Ghent
- Royal Academy of Art (The Hague), (founded 1682), an art academy based in The Hague
- Académie de peinture et de sculpture, (founded 1648), in Paris
- Académie Royale des Beaux-Arts, (founded 1711), in Brussels
- Real Academia de Bellas Artes de San Fernando ("Royal Academy of Fine Art of San Fernando"), Spain's most prestigious fine arts institution
- Swedish Royal Academies, a group of independent organisations that promote arts and culture in Sweden
- Royal Scottish Academy, an art institution in Scotland
- Academy of Fine Arts Munich, founded as the "Royal Academy of Fine Arts"
- Royal Hibernian Academy, an Irish arts academy
- Royal Swedish Academy of Arts
- Royal Academy summer exhibition, a London art exhibit
- Royal Canadian Academy of Arts
- Korean Royal Academy of Painting (founded between 1463 and 1469)

== Music and dance ==
- Royal Academy of Dance, a dance institution specialising in Classical Ballet, founded in London, England in 1920.
- Royal Academy of Music, a music conservatoire based in London
- Royal Danish Academy of Music
- Royal Academy of Music in Aarhus
- Royal Academy of Music Museum, a British music museum
- Royal Swedish Academy of Music
- Royal Academy (China), a historical institution for music, dance and theatre in China

== Sciences ==
=== Belgium ===
- Royal Flemish Academy of Belgium for Science and the Arts
- The Royal Academies for Science and the Arts of Belgium
- Royal Academy of Overseas Sciences, a Belgian scientific academy
- Royal Belgian Entomological Society

=== France ===
- The Royal Academy of Sciences, one of the names of the French Academy of Sciences (founded 1666), which is now part of the French Institute

=== Germany ===
- Royal Prussian Academy of Sciences

=== Spain ===
- Spanish Royal Academy of Sciences
- Spanish Royal Academy of Naval Engineers
- Real Academia de la Historia
- Real Academia de Ciencias Morales y Políticas
- Royal Academy of Jurisprudence and Legislation
- Royal Academy of Pharmacy
- Royal Academy of Engineering of Spain
- Spanish Royal Society of Chemistry

=== Italy ===
- Royal Academy of Italy
- Royal Academy of Sciences and Humanities of Naples
- Royal Medico-Surgical Academy of Napoli
- Reale Accademia Ercolanese

=== United Kingdom ===
- Royal Society, the Academy of Sciences of the United Kingdom
- Royal Academy of Engineering, a national engineering institution based in London
- Royal Astronomical Society
- Royal Aeronautical Society
- Royal Society of Medicine
- Royal Society of Tropical Medicine and Hygiene

== Other ==
- Royal Swedish Academy of Sciences
- Royal Danish Academy of Sciences and Letters
- Royal Irish Academy
- Royal Netherlands Academy of Arts and Sciences
- Royal Scientific Society
- Royal Society of New Zealand

== Military ==
- Royal Military Academy, Woolwich, a British academy for engineers and artillery, now closed
- Royal Military Academy
- Royal Military Academy Sandhurst, British
- Royal Naval Academy, British
- Chulachomklao Royal Military Academy, Thai military academy

== Other ==
- Royal Academy (horse), a thoroughbred racehorse

== See also ==
- Regal Academy, an Italian animated television series
- Royal Society (disambiguation)
