= The Academy (hotel) =

Hotel in Bloomsbury, London, England

Coordinates: 51.520691°N 0.13103°W

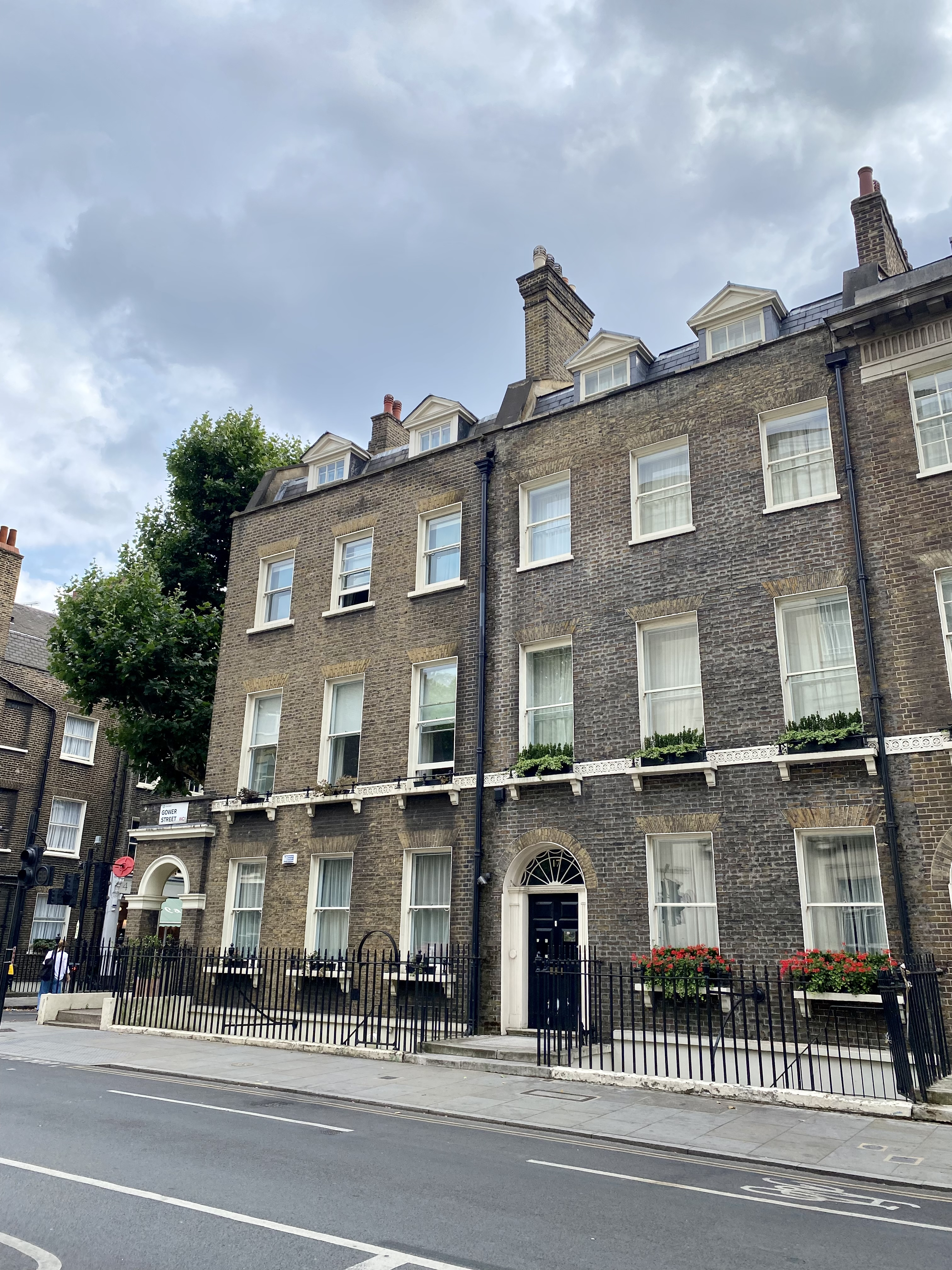
- Interactive map of the The Academy area

General information
- Location: 21 Gower Street, Bloomsbury, London; WC1E 6HG
- Opening: March 2000
- Owner: YTL Hotels

Other information
- Number of rooms: 50

Website
- https://www.theacademyhotel.co.uk/

The Academy is a 5 star London hotel with 50 rooms / suites, located in the Garden Square district of Bloomsbury. The hotel, which originally opened in March 2000, was originally five private homes built in 1776. In 2018, the hotel underwent a renovation by YTL Hotels and Champalimaud Design. The hotel is part of the Small Luxury Hotels of the World collection. It forms part of a Grade II listed building named "Numbers 15A and 17 to 49 and Attached Railings" which is a terrace of 18 houses and was listed on 28 March 1969.
