= Bertha Sokoloff =

British communist in WW2 (1919–2018)

Bertha Sokoloff (born in Whitechapel, London; 15 June 1919 – 16 April 2018) was a prominent figure within the Stepney Communist Party, and was its General Secretary in 1940 and 1941 during the Second World War.

== Early life ==
Sokoloff was born in Whitechapel, in the East End of London to Romanian immigrants Rachel and Jacob Markovitch. She was the third of their four children. Sokoloff's father left the family after entering a relationship with a nurse who looked after him following an injury during an army training exercise in the First World War. Sokoloff's mother thus raised her children with help from Jewish charities; Bertha was described by her daughter as "an atheist but culturally Jewish".

Growing up in Spitalfields, Sokoloff attended Robert Montefiore Primary School before gained a scholarship to Central Foundation Girls' School. She left at 16 and became a secretary at the Royal Institute of International Affairs, then for Victor Gollancz Ltd.

== Politics and work ==
Sokoloff was a branch secretary at Stepney Borough Council before marrying fellow Young Communist Stan Sokoloff in 1940. In 1943, she took up war work in a factory where she was made productivity officer. Bertha was key in preparing for the 1945 general and municipal elections in the Communist Party of Great Britain (CPGB), and was the agent for Communist Member of Parliament Phil Piratin in 1945 who became elected as a councillor that year.

A leading organiser in the Stepney Tenants Defence League (a front of the Stepney Communists which organised rent strikes in the 1930s), Sokoloff called Piratin "the tenants' champion" and promised affordable housing and rent control in Stepney. He won a narrow victory, partially due to rent strikers such as Sokoloff. She left the CPGB in 1957 over the heavy-handed response of the Soviet Union to the Hungarian Revolution one year prior, but remained politically active her entire life. In 1987, she wrote a book on fellow educator and community activist Edith Ramsay.

== Later life ==
After teaching in infant schools, in 1971 Bertha graduated from London University in sociology in 1971. In the 1970s, she taught mature students at Woolwich College in the 1970s, and "contributed to the social life of Bromley Reform Synagogue" following her retirement.

== Bibliography ==
- Edith and Stepney: the life of Edith Ramsay. Stepney Books. 1987. ISBN 978-0950524160.

== See also ==
- Ella Donovan
- George Lansbury
