= Faculty =

Faculty or faculties may refer to:

== Academia ==
- Faculty (academic staff), professors, researchers, and teachers of a given university or college (North American usage)
- Faculty (division), a large department of a university by field of study (used outside North America)

== Biology ==
- An ability of an individual
  - Cognitive skills, colloquially faculties
  - Senses or perceptive faculties—such as sight, hearing or touch
  - Faculty Psychology, suggests the mind is divided into sections, each assigned specific mental tasks.

== Business ==
- Faculty (company), a British tech firm (formerly ASI)

== Film and television ==
- The Faculty, a 1998 horror/sci-fi movie by Robert Rodriguez
- The Faculty (TV series), a 1996 American sitcom

== Religious law ==
- Faculty (canon law), a judicial instrument or warrant in Christian canon law
- A priest's right to perform Christian liturgies
