= George Hoellering =

Austrian film director (1897–1980)

- Born: Georg Michael Höllering; 20 July 1897; Baden, near Vienna, Austria
- Died: 10 February 1980 (aged 82); Suffolk, England
- Occupation: Film director
- Spouse(s): Emma Weidenauer (died 1927) Dora Constance Lehmann (m. 1929; died 1955) Anne Allnatt (m. 1956)
- Children: 2, including Ivo Jarosy (stepson)

George Michael Hoellering (20 July 1897 – 10 February 1980) was an Austrian film director, producer and cinema manager. He directed Hortobagy (1936) about the Puszta in Hungary, as well as the 1951 British film Murder in the Cathedral, which he co-wrote with T. S. Eliot. He was the director of the Academy Cinema in London's Oxford Street from 1944 until his death in 1980.

== Early life ==
George Hoellering was born as Georg Michael Höllering in Baden, near Vienna, Austria, on 20 July 1897, the third of four children of the musician and impresario, Georg Höllering, and his wife, Maria Magdalene.

== Career ==
From 1919 to 1924 Hoellering was licensee of the Schikaneder Kino in Vienna. At the beginning of the 1920s he moved to Berlin, managed his Vienna cinema from the distance, and worked in the film industry as an editor and director of shorts. He was production manager of Kuhle Wampe (1932), a German film classic, written by Bertolt Brecht. With the approaching Nazi takeover at the end of 1932, Hoellering and his pregnant Jewish wife thought it wise to leave Germany. For a short time they settled in Vienna.

Early in 1934, Hoellering, his family and the cameraman László Schäffer moved to Hungary, to make a film at the famous Puszta of Hortobágy. The film Hortobagy is a docu-fiction, an amalgam of documentary shots with a threefold story-line, which is acted out by peasants and herdsmen. As the Hungarian censors ordered Hortobagy to be cut by more than 10%, in 1936 Hoellering decided to emigrate to England. The London premiere of Hortobagy was set by The Film Society for Sunday 13 December 1936 in the New Gallery Cinema, where the film could be shown without a British license.

Graham Greene wrote about the film in The Spectator: "Undoubtedly, the horses have it. Hortobagy, a film of the Hungarian plains, acted by peasants and shepherds, is one of the most satisfying films I have seen: it belongs to the order of Dovzhenko’s Earth without the taint of propaganda. The photography is extraordinarily beautiful, the cutting superb." And later: "The leaping of the stallions, the foaling of the mares are shown with a frankness devoid of offence and add to the impression that here we are seeing, as far as humanly possible, the whole of a way of life. But we are not asked to admire one way more than another, the horse more than the tractor."

Hoellering became a director of the Academy Cinema in London's Oxford Street where Elsie Cohen was the manager. From 1944 until his death in 1980 he was the manager and part-owner.

In the summer of 1940, the British authorities arrested and interned all "enemy aliens", including Hoellering, and transported them for several months to the Isle of Man. In the camp there he wrote, organised and directed an amateur theatre production, a musical called "What a Life!" The music, mostly written by fellow inmate Hans Gál, was also played by inmates. During the war years, Hoellering directed several wartime propaganda shorts for different ministries, and Message from Canterbury (1944), a documentary made with the close cooperation of Archbishop William Temple.

His 1950 film, Shapes and Forms is considered to be the first appearance of the Institute of Contemporary Arts (ICA) on film.

He worked for several years on the film version of T.S.Eliot's Murder in the Cathedral, which won two prizes (Best Art Direction and Best Film in Costume) at the Venice International Film Festival, 1951.

Hoellering was appointed to the Board of Governors of the British Film Institute by Harold Wilson's government.

== Personal life ==
Hoellering in 1919 married Emma Weidenauer, a German actress, who died in 1927 in cancer.

His second wife, Dora Constance Lehmann, had been previously married and had a son, Ivo Jarosy. She was the daughter of Felix Lehmann and his wife Anna Friedländer. They married in 1929 in Baden, Austria, and their only child, Andrew, was born in Vienna in 1932. Dora died in England in 1955. On 24 November 1956, Hoellering married Anne Allnatt (b. 1925/6) the daughter of Alfred Ernest Allnatt, a building contractor.

== Death ==
He died in Suffolk on 10 February 1980.

== Selected filmography ==
- Hunting You (1929), producer
- Kuhle Wampe (1932), production manager
- Hortobágy (1936), director and producer
- Murder in the Cathedral (1951), director, producer, screenwriter and co-editor

=== World War II newsreel trailers ===
- Water Saving (1942), director
- Water Pipes (1942), director
- Eyes on the Target (1942), director
- Salvage Saves Shipping (1943), producer
- Peak Load (1943), producer
- Make Do and Mend Parties (1943), producer
- Blood Will Out (1943), director and producer
- Skeleton in the Cupboard (1943), director and producer
- Blood Will Out (1943), director and producer
- Books, Books, Books (1943), director and producer
- Old Logs (1943), director and producer
- Tim Marches Back (1944), director and producer
- Tyre Economy (1944), director and producer
- Hands Off (1945), director and producer
- Golden Glory (1945), director and producer
- Help Wanted (1945), director and producer
- Paper Possibilities (1945), director and producer
- Family Allowances (1946), director
- Briquette Making (1946), director

=== Shorts ===
- Message from Canterbury (1944), director, producer and editor
- Shapes and Forms (1950), director, producer, screenwriter and editor
- Plan for Living (1950), director and producer
- Glasgow Orpheus Choir (1951), director, producer, screenwriter and co-editor
