= Academy Bay =

Coordinates: 0°45′S 90°17′W

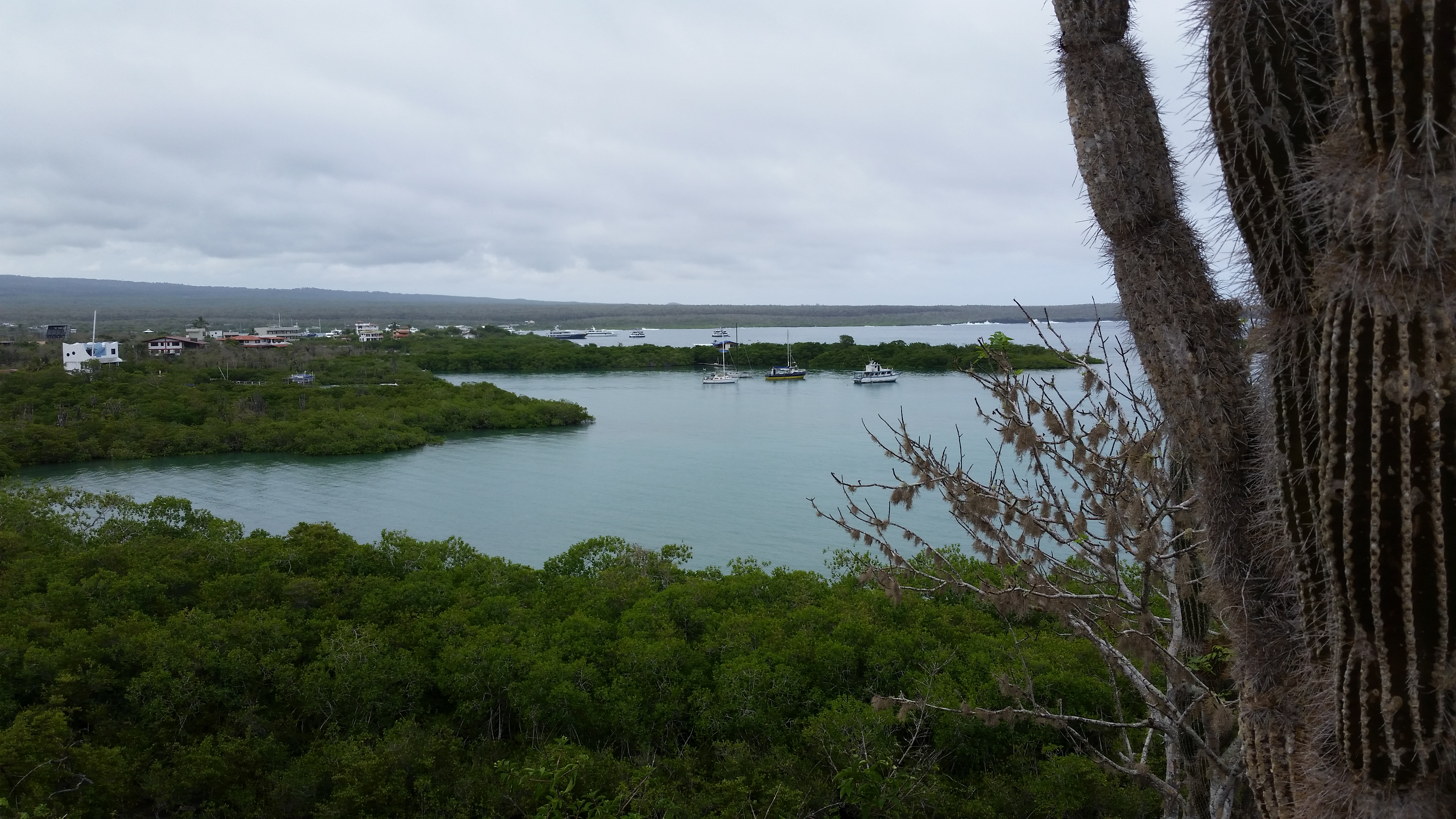
Academy Bay as seen from Las Grietas

Academy Bay (Spanish: Bahía de la Academia) is the natural harbor of Santa Cruz Island in the Galápagos Islands archipelago. The bay was named for the California Academy of Sciences, which sent an expedition here in 1905. It is home to the Charles Darwin Research Station, founded in 1959 to preserve and study the Galapagos wildlife. It was here that the crew of the Norwegian ship Alexandra was rescued in 1906.

Popular with sailors and tourists, Academy Bay is bordered by the town of Puerto Ayora, the largest town in the Galápagos. Wildlife includes sea lions, and lava flows come up to the edge of the water. Scuba diving is particularly popular, as water temperatures remain comfortable year round (18–25 °C) and visibility is generally excellent (10–20 m).

Academy Bay is an example of a graben structure: a down-dropped block bound by faults. This kind of structure is characteristic of extensional deformation of the Earth's crust.
