= Academy, South Dakota =

Unincorporated community in South Dakota, U.S.

Academy is an unincorporated community in Charles Mix County, in the U.S. state of South Dakota. Academy is located at 43°27′23″N 99°04′47″W.

== History ==
A post office called Academy was established in 1899. The community took its name from the Ward Academy, which was once located there.
