= Academy Cinema, Bristol =

Former cinema in Bristol, England

Academy Cinema
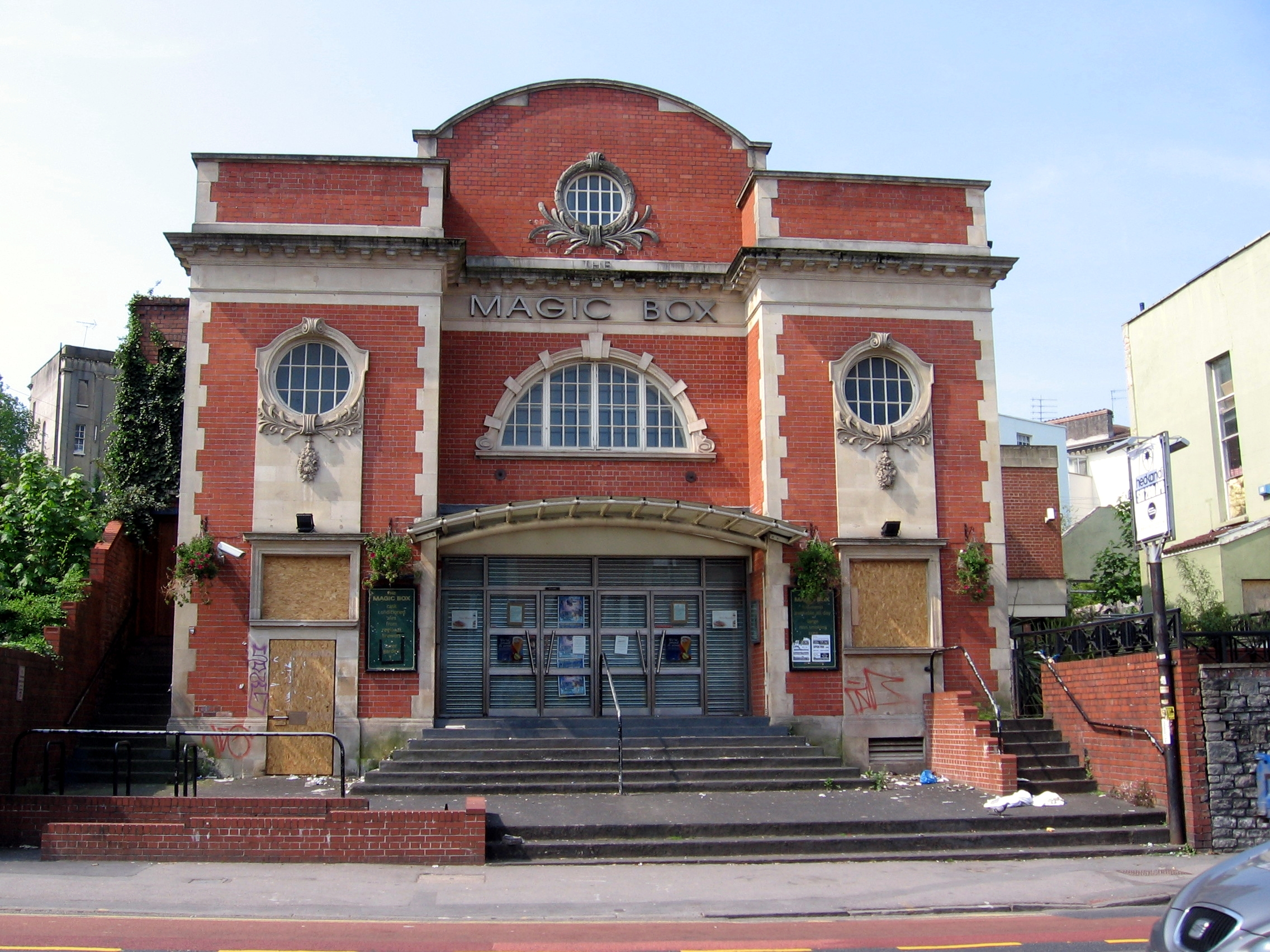

- Location within Bristol

General information
- Architectural style: Baroque
- Location: Bristol, England
- Coordinates: 51.4646°N 2.5903°W
- Completed: 1914

The Academy Cinema (grid reference ST590744) is a historic building on Cheltenham Road in the Stokes Croft area of Bristol, England. Since its construction in 1914, it has been used for many purposes. It is a Grade II listed building.

The cinema was built by William Watkins in 1914 in an Edwardian Baroque style (also called ‘Mock Renaissance’ style). The open plan brick building has a symmetrical front with doors in a recessed central bay approached by steps from the street. This is surmounted by a lunette and voussoir above which is an oculus as an attic window.

It opened as the Cheltenham Cinema, which was owned by Ralph Pringle. It was renamed as The Plaza and then became the Academy Cinema which was used as the name until its closure in 1955.

In 1955, it became a Christadelphian Hall or chapel. The Wetherspoons pub chain purchased it in 1998 it was adapted for use as a bar under the name The Magic Box. The name was chosen in honour of William Friese-Greene a Bristolian founder of cinematography. The pub closed in 2006 and was refurbished as a new venue for Jesters Comedy Club, which opened in 2008 with the venue known as The Metropolis. The Metropolis was used as a music venue hosting a variety of local and national bands. Jesters moved to another venue in 2012 and the building was placed on the market for £350,000.

In 2014, plans were approved by Bristol City Council for the building to be converted into a mosque, despite objections from the English Defence League.
