= La Academia USA =

The first American musical reality show with only Hispanic contestants

La Academia USA was the first musical reality show with only Hispanic contestants launched by Azteca America in October 2005. The auditions were done nationwide and a total of 30 people were chosen to go to Mexico where they would have to spend a week working hard and showing all of what they had inside to be chosen to the final 18.

The first La Academia USA concert was on November 20, 2005.

A week before the first concert, there was a special show that lasted two hours. In that show, footage from the auditions was shown. At the end, 12 of the 30 were eliminated leaving the lucky 18 that Azteca America had chosen to become the first generation of La Academia USA.

One of the participants was Michael Anthony Muenchow Rivera, who was previously on Telemundo's song-based reality show Nuevas Voces de América (New Voices of America) in 2005; he was one of the 18 selected. Michael lives in San Antonio, Texas and made it to the top 13 final singers, before being expelled. His vote off was one of the results that caused the most uproar among viewers and the teachers alike. This was also true for the premature elimination, in the eleventh concert, of Diana Galindo Martínez, whom many thought would become the winner of La Academia USA for her great voice, big popularity among the public and the good comments by the critics.

After three months of competition La Academia USA came to an end, crowning Mariana Vargas as winner of the Latin Reality Show. As the winner and runner-up, Mariana and Gustavo respectively received contracts with Warner Music for the release of an album.

After the show ended and after the cancellation of the highly anticipated "La Academia Hot-Tour" many of the ex-students of La Academia USA, including Michael, Diana, Frankie, Fatimat, Jazmín, Alejandro ("El Chino") and Nohelia were called back to continue singing together for their fans across the United States. Among other projects is the formation of a band by joining the voices of Ivannkie, Adán, Catalina and Heloisa.

Being a Latin American event and taking place in an ethnically diverse country, La Academia USA featured participants born in different Latin American countries, or at least with Latin roots being born in the United States. Here are some countries where most come from: Mexico, Venezuela, Honduras, Colombia, Puerto Rico, the Dominican Republic and Brazil.

In 2007, Frankie Alvarado participated in a duet with Spanish Pop rock singer Diana Mera; the song is called "20 Pedacitos".

== Participants (2005–2006) ==
=== Winner ===
- Blanca Mariana Vargas Grajeda

=== Finalists ===
- 2nd place: Gustavo Alfonso Amezcua Fuentes
- 3rd place: Nohelia María Sosa Guerrero
- 4th place: Afid Ferrer Ávalos
- 5th place: Yoshigei Cázares Silva

=== Eliminated ===
- Jazmín Olivo Ceballos
- Francisco Alvarado Rivera (Frankie)
- Adán Castillo
- Iván Quiñonez (Ivannkie)
- Diana Galindo Martínez
- Heloisa Alves
- Catalina Naranjo
- Michael Anthony Muenchow Rivera
- Gabriel Juan Rodríguez Policastro
- Alejandro Hernández López (El Chino)
- Carlos Soto García
- Bianca Filio Martínez
- Fatimat Aihassan Villanueva

== Order of expulsion ==
Order	Concert 1	Concert 2	Concert 3	Concert 4	Concert 5	Concert 7	Concert 8	Concert 9	Concert 10	Concert 11	Concert 12	Concert 13	Concert 14	Final
1	Adán	Adán	Adán	Adán	Adán	Adán	Adán	Adán	Adán	Adán	Adán	Afid	Afid	Mariana
2	Afid	Afid	Afid	Afid	Afid	Afid	Afid	Afid	Afid	Afid	Afid	Frankie	Gustavo	Gustavo
3	Alejandro	Alejandro	Alejandro	Alejandro	Catalina	Catalina	Catalina	Diana	Diana	Frankie	Frankie	Gustavo	Mariana	Nohelia
4	Bianca	Bianca	Carlos	Catalina	Diana	Diana	Diana	Frankie	Frankie	Gustavo	Gustavo	Jazmin	Nohelia	Afid
5	Carlos	Carlos	Catalina	Diana	Frankie	Frankie	Frankie	Gustavo	Gustavo	Iván	Jazmín	Mariana	Yoshigei	Yoshigei
6	Catalina	Catalina	Diana	Frankie	Gabriel	Gustavo	Gustavo	Heloisa	Iván	Jazmín	Mariana	Nohelia	Jazmín	
7	Diana	Diana	Frankie	Gabriel	Gustavo	Heloisa	Heloisa	Iván	Jazmín	Mariana	Nohelia	Yoshigei	Frankie	
8	Fatimat	Frankie	Gabriel	Gustavo	Heloisa	Iván	Iván	Jazmín	Mariana	Nohelia	Yoshigei	Adán		
9	Frankie	Gabriel	Gustavo	Heloisa	Iván	Jazmín	Jazmín	Mariana	Nohelia	Yoshigei	Iván			
10	Gabriel	Gustavo	Heloisa	Iván	Jazmín	Mariana	Mariana	Nohelia	Yoshigei	Diana				
11	Gustavo	Heloisa	Iván	Jazmín	Mariana	Michael	Nohelia	Yoshigei	Heloisa					
12	Heloisa	Iván	Jazmín	Mariana	Michael	Nohelia	Yoshigei	Catalina						
13	Iván	Jazmín	Mariana	Michael	Nohelia	Yoshigei	Michael							
14	Jazmín	Mariana	Michael	Nohelia	Yoshigei	Gabriel								
15	Mariana	Michael	Nohelia	Yoshigei	Alejandro									
16	Michael	Nohelia	Yoshigei	Carlos										
17	Nohelia	Yoshigei	Bianca											
18	Yoshigei	Fatimat												

- The contestant was expelled from the competition
  The contestant abandoned the competition
  The contestant won the competition
  The contestant was a runner-up

Heloisa Alves was an anchor for the sports show Los Protagonistas a Nivel mundial for TV AZTECA AMERICA during the 2006 Soccer World Cup, and she won the Miss Brazil USA contest in November 2007. Heloisa has recorded commercials for Bally Total Fitness, and she has done publicity for Cingular Wireless.

Desarrollo del Concurso del Primer Academia USA
Lugar	Participante	2005-11-20	2005-11-27	2005-12-04	2005-12-11	2005-12-18	2005-12-25	2006-01-01	2006-01-08	2006-01-15	2006-01-22	2006-01-29	2006-02-05	2006-02-12	2006-02-19	2006-02-26
1	Mariana	Viveme	México en la piel	Acariciame	Nunca voy a olvidarte	Devorame otra vez	Without you	Si tú no estás aquí	La trampa	Ay amor	Oye mi canto	Me asusta pero me gusta y Odio amarte	Quién eres tú y A quién le importa	Paloma negra y Caraluna	Si nos dejan, Dame una señal y Cheque en blanco	Paloma negra y Mentira
2	Gustavo	Mi credo	Mujeres divinas	Noviembre sin ti	Es mejor decir adiós	La copa de la vida	La cosa mas bella	Aire	El triste	Baila morena	Pedro Navajas	La camisa negra y El baile del perrito	Juliana y Lo que pasó, pasó	La planta y Aca entre nos	Que de raro tiene, Yo no fui y Muchacha triste	Mujeres divinas y Al final
3	Nohelia	Viveme	En el último lugar del mundo	Amar sin ser amada	Con los años que me quedan	Regresa a mí	Amanecí otra vez	Innocente pobre amiga	Eternamente bella	Te quedo grande la yegua	Es demasiado tarde	Como olvidar y Odio amarte	Rata de dos patas y A quién le importa	Aprenderé y Cosas del amor	No hace falta, Entra en mi vida y Cheque en blanco	Te quedo grande la yegua y Que ganas de no verte nunca mas
4	Afid	Pasión	México lindo y querido	A chillar a otra parte	Amor eterno	Aún sigues siendo mía	Ave María	Bamboleo	Secreto de amor	Salome	La Bamba	Volveré y El baile del perrito	Canta corazón y Lo que pasó, pasó	Y todo para que y Aca entre nos	La puerta negra, Yo no fui y Muchacha triste	La Bamba y Cuándo yo quería ser grande
5	Yoshigei	Could I have this kiss forever?	Besame mucho	Costumbres	Algo más	Falsas esperanzas	Cucurrucucú, paloma	La diferencia	Amor a la mexicana	Bidi, bidi, bombom	Llegar a ti	Listen to your heart y Odio amarte	Cómo se cura una herida y A quién le importa	Sin él y Cosas del amor	Mentiras, Entra en mi vida y Cheque en blanco	Llegar a ti y I will always love you
6	Frankie	Rock around the clock	Visa por un sueño	El alma en pie	Para tu amor	A gritos de esperanza	María	Bulería	Mi dulce niña	Corazón Partío	Lloraré las penas	En mi viejo San Juan y El baile del perrito	Esta ausencia y Lo que pasó, pasó	Me va extrañar y Azul	Perdóname, Dame una señal y Muchacha triste	
7	Jazmín	Tres gotas de agua bendita	Bandolero	Hacer el amor con otro	Piensa en mí	Ese hombre	Tú eres mi luz	A que no le cuentas	Lluvia	Que le den candela	Basta ya	A mi manera y Odio amarte	Burbujas de amor y A quién le importa	Es ella más que yo y Caraluna	Ten cuidado con el corazón, Entra en mi vida y Cheque en blanco	
8	Adán	Could I have this kiss forever?	Have I told you lately that I love you	A puro dolor	No te preocupes por mí	Usted se me llevo la vida	I want it that away	Dímelo	Otro día más sin verte	Sirena	No me quiero enamorar	Mi bombón y El baile del perrito	Eres mi verdad y Lo que pasó, pasó	Baby, I love your way y Azul		
9	Iván	Nobody wants to be lonely	Valió la pena	Tocando fondo	Ángel	Lamento boliviano	No podrás	TBC	Ahora quién	Te amo	Princesa tibetana	Te buscaría y El baile del perrito	Suave y Lo que pasó, pasó			
10	Diana	Pasión	Quién como tú	Echame a mi la culpa	No se si es amor	Cuándo baja la marea	Vive y llora	Sola con mi soledad	Así fue	Como hemos cambiado	No me enseñaste	Muriendo lento y Odio amarte				
11	Heloisa	Nada fue un error	Hijo de la luna	Cuéntame	Mía	Tomalo suave	Candela	A cada paso que doy	Ave María	I love rock and roll	La chica de Ipanema					
12	Catalina	Nobody wants to be lonely	Hasta el fin del mundo	Killing me softly	No me queda más	Daría	Que bello	Pero me acuerdo de ti	Did not show up	Ven conmigo						
