= Cercle Funambulesque =

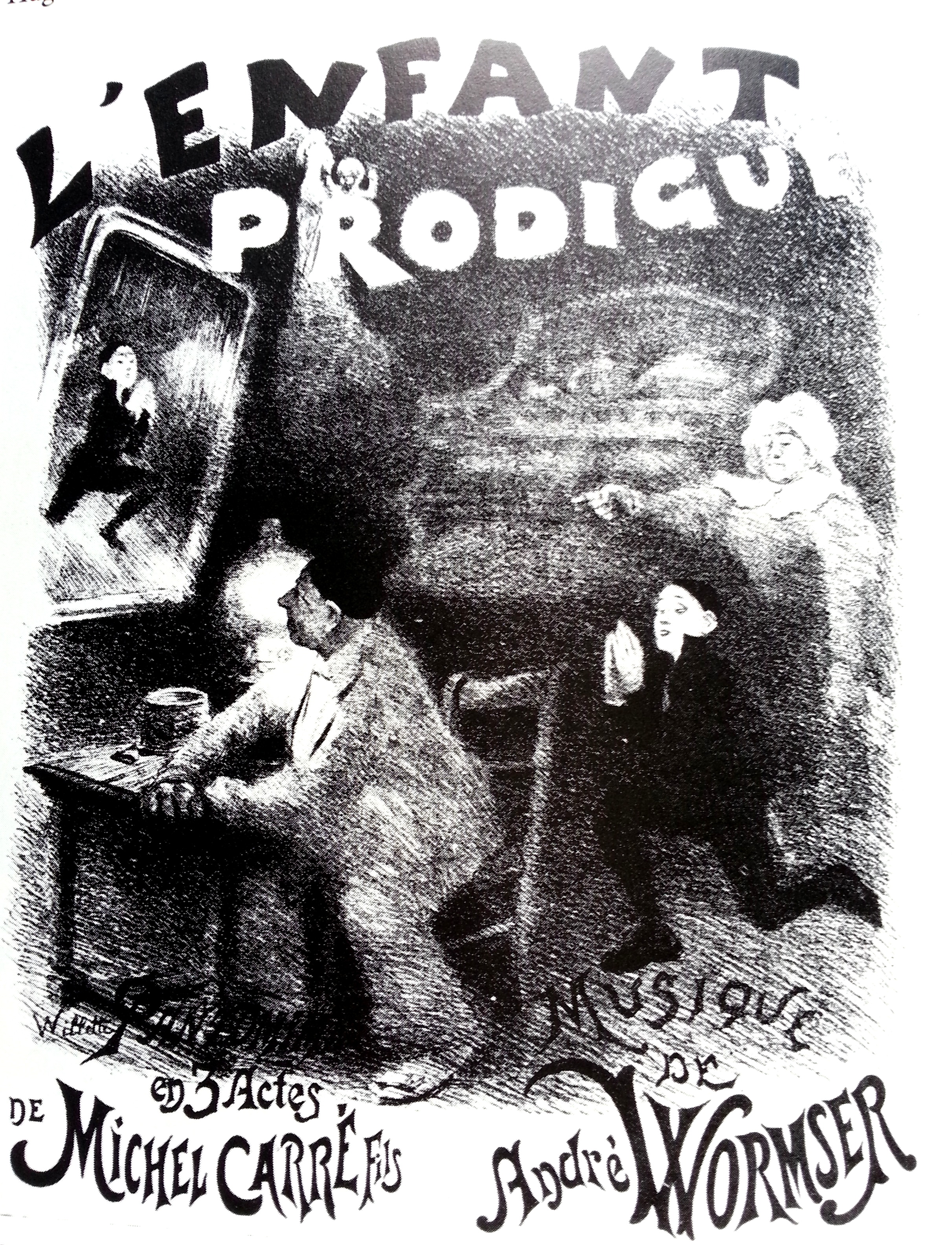
Adolphe Willette: poster for pantomime L'Enfant prodigue (1890) by Michel Carré fils. Reproduced in Ernest Maindron, Les Affiches illustrées (1886-1895) (Paris: Boudet, 1896).

The Cercle Funambulesque (1888–1898)—roughly translatable as "Friends of the Funambules"—was a Parisian theatrical society that produced pantomimes inspired by the commedia dell'arte, particularly by the exploits of its French Pierrot. It included among its approximately one hundred and fifty subscriber-members such notables in the arts as the novelist J.-K. Huysmans, the composer Jules Massenet, the illustrator Jules Chéret, and the actor Coquelin cadet. Among its successes was L'Enfant prodigue (1890), which was filmed twice, first in 1907, then in 1916, making history as the first European feature-length movie and the first complete stage-play on film.

== Background ==
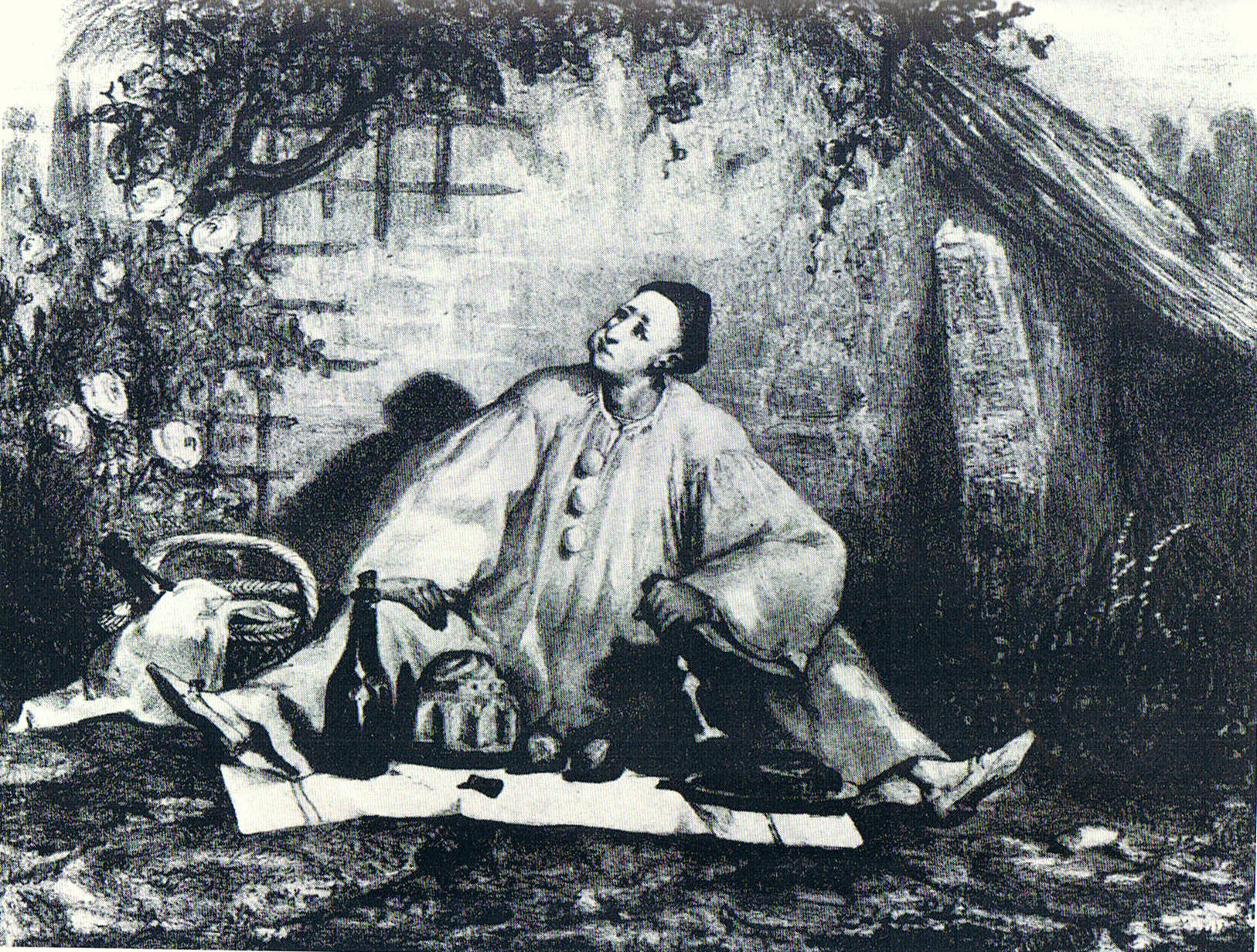
Auguste Bouquet: Pierrot's Repast: Jean-Gaspard Deburau as Pierrot Gourmand, c. 1830. Engraving in Harvard Theatre Collection.

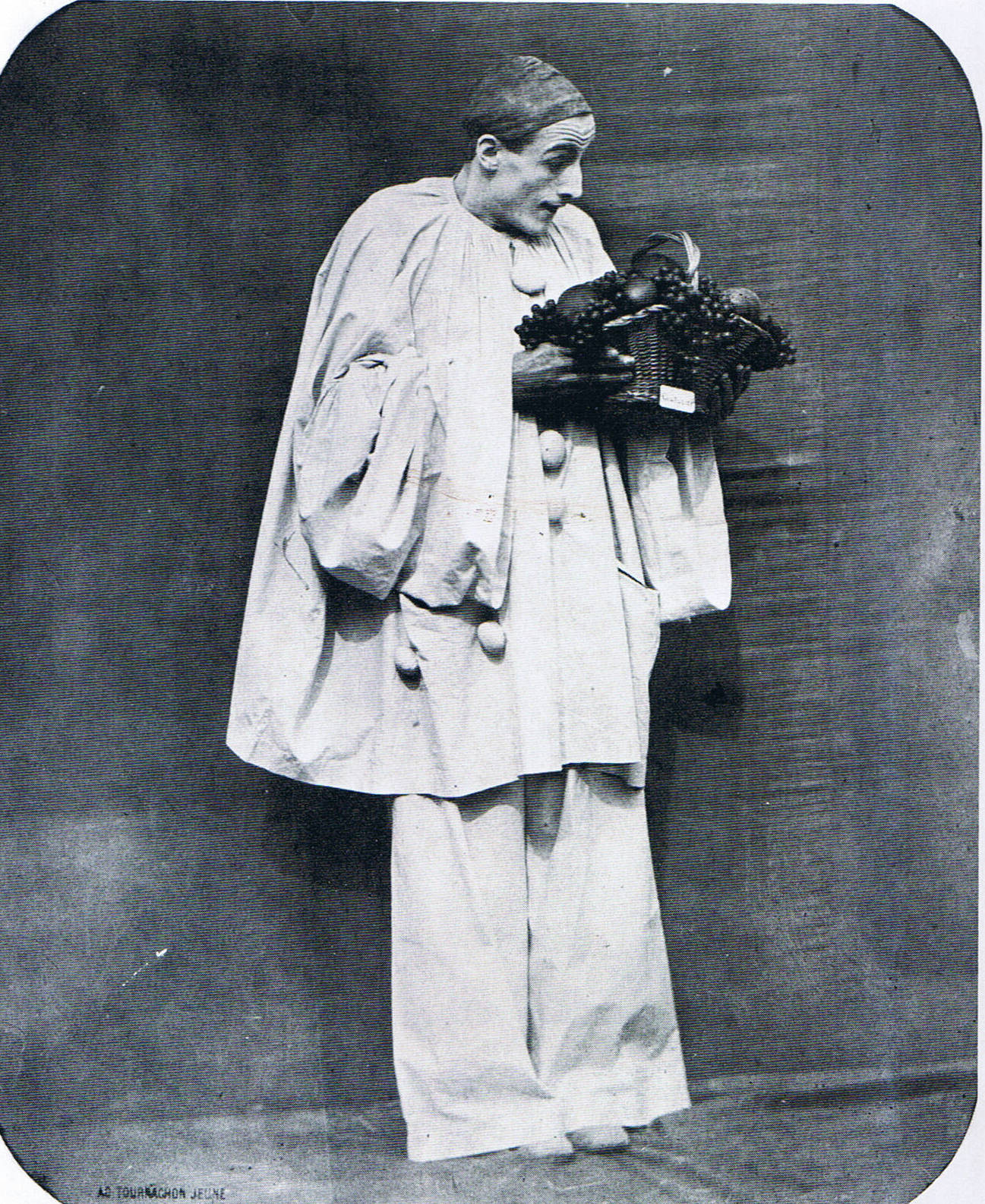
Nadar: Charles Deburau as Pierrot, c. 1855. Bibliothèque nationale, Paris.

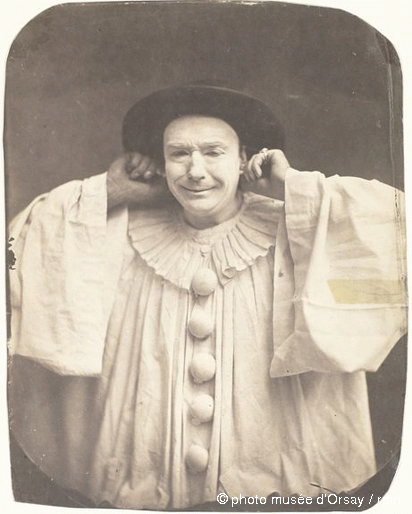
Nadar: Paul Legrand as Pierrot, c. 1857. Musée d'Orsay, Paris.

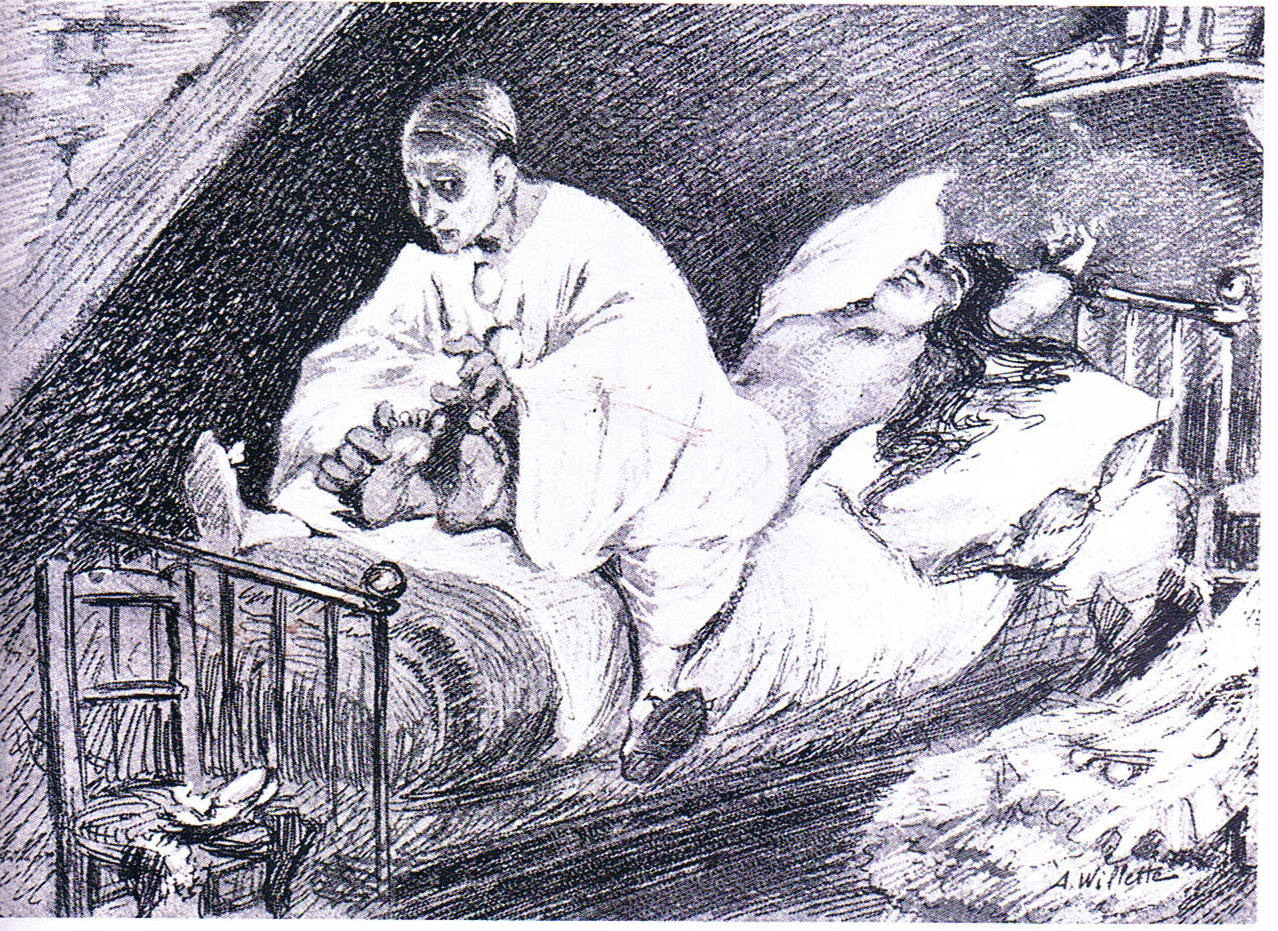
Pierrot tickles Columbine to death. Drawing by Adolphe Willette in Le Pierrot, December 7, 1888, inspired by Paul Margueritte's Pierrot, Murderer of His Wife (1881).

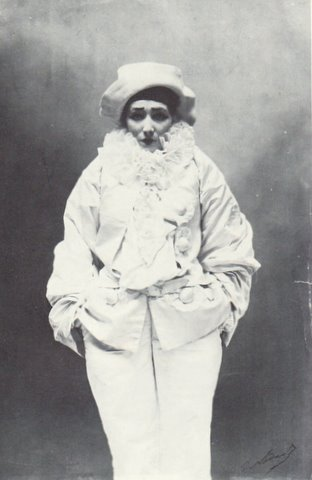
Atelier Nadar: Sarah Bernhardt in Jean Richepin's Pierrot the Murderer, 1883. Bibliothèque nationale, Paris.

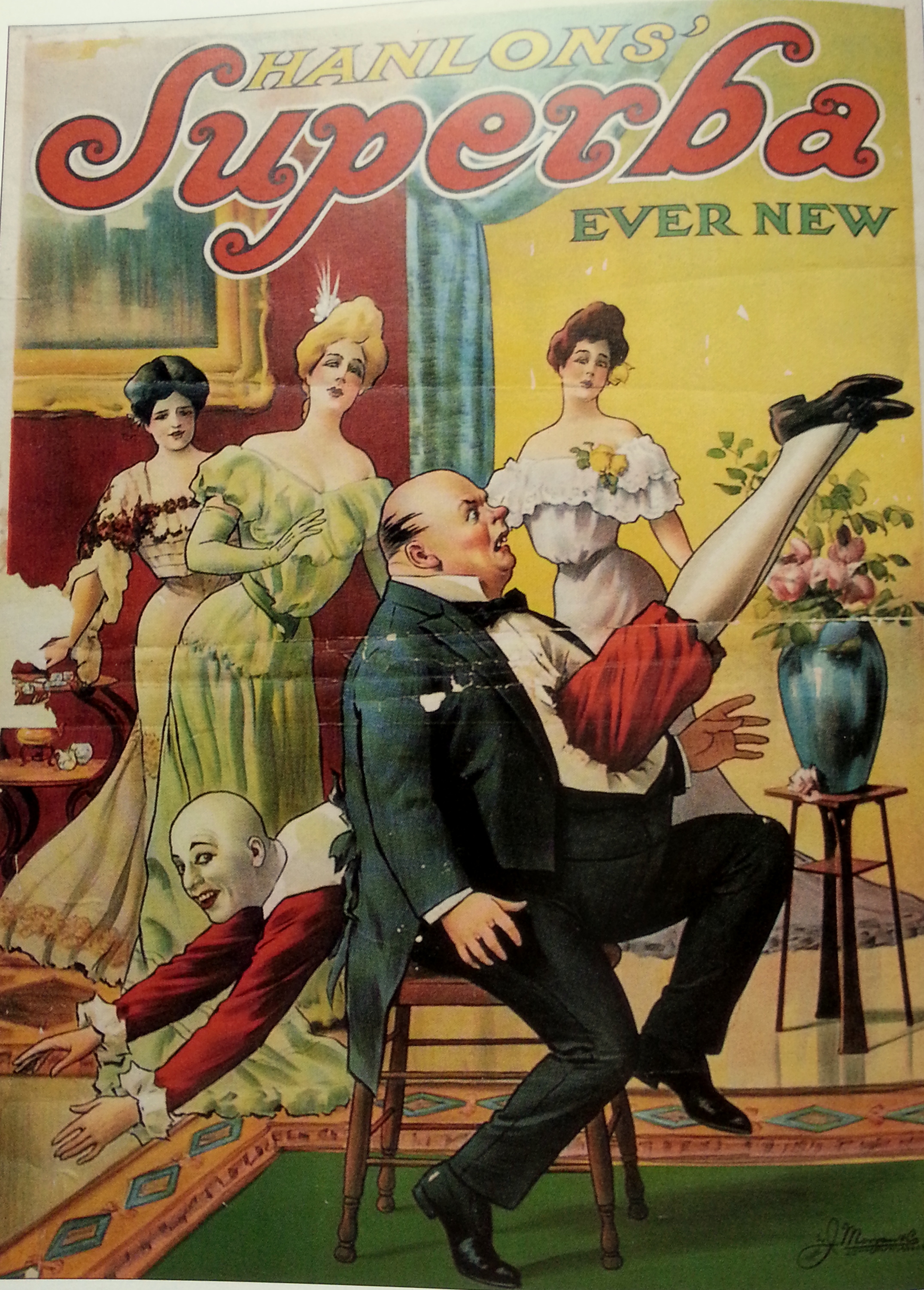
Anon.: poster for Hanlon-Lees' Superba (1890–1911). Theatre Collection of the New York Public Library at Lincoln Center.

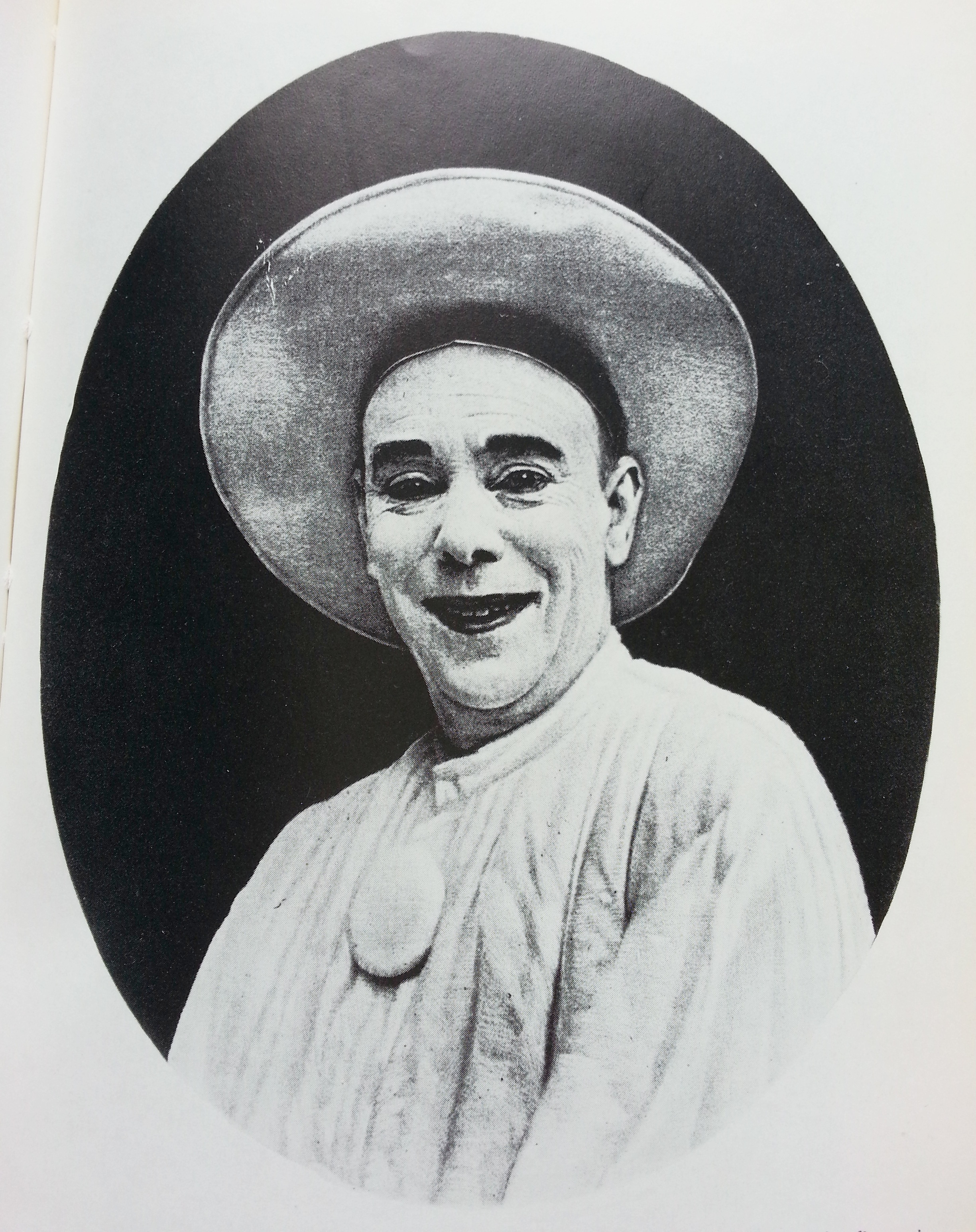
Raoul de Najac as Pierrot. Reproduced in Najac's Souvenirs d'un mime (Paris: Emile-Paul, 1909).

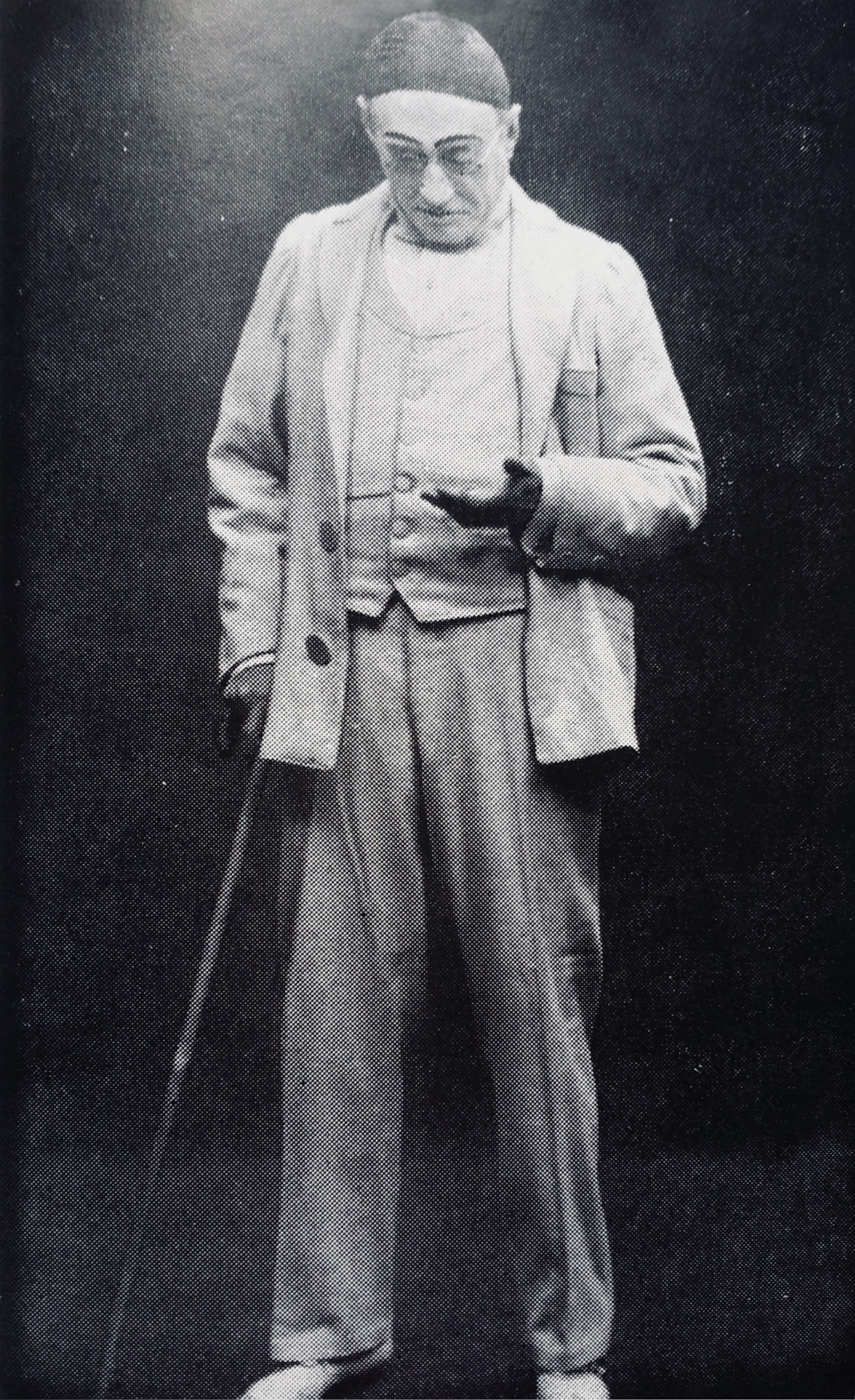
Atelier Walery, Paris: Georges Wague as Père Pierrot in the 1907 film L'Enfant prodigue. Bibliothèque nationale, Paris.

From about 1825 to 1860, the theater-goers of Paris were witness to a Golden Age of Pantomime. At the Théâtre des Funambules, Jean-Gaspard Deburau, called by the eminent poet and journalist Théophile Gautier "the most perfect actor who ever lived", created, in his celebrated mute Pierrot, a legendary, almost mythic figure, immortalized by Jean-Louis Barrault in Marcel Carné's film Children of Paradise (1945). After his death, his son Charles, playing at the same theater, revived for the grateful enthusiasts of the genre his father's agility and gaity; and Charles's rival Paul Legrand, who reinvented Pierrot as the sensitive soul so familiar to post-nineteenth-century devotees of the figure, earned warm admiration from his public (including Gautier) for his performances at the Folies-Nouvelles. But, by the early 1860s, interest in the pantomime, at least in the capital, had begun to flag, and both Legrand and Deburau fils had to seek out audiences elsewhere. Deburau died young, in 1873, having taken his art to Marseille and Bordeaux, where he founded a so-called school of pantomime. Legrand, after working in Bordeaux and abroad, found employment in the 1870s at the Tertulia, a Parisian café-concert, and in the late 1880s, at the end of his career, at a children's theater, the Théâtre-Vivienne. Both venues represented a considerable step down from the Folies-Nouvelles. One of the historians of French pantomime, Robert Storey, writes that Legrand, in these years, "seems to have been forgotten by his public, the pantomime itself suffering death-throes at the capital while struggling for rebirth in the south of France." When the mime made an appearance, around 1880, in a pantomime at the Variétés, he struck Paul and Victor Margueritte, rare admirers of his art, as "a survivor of a quite distant epoch".

It would be the self-assumed task of one of those brothers, Paul Margueritte, to revive the pantomime. In 1882, Paul sent his just-published Pierrot assassin de sa femme (Pierrot, Murderer of His Wife), a pantomime he had devised the previous year for the audiences of his amateur theatricals in Valvins, to several writers, hoping to renew interest in the genre. It apparently found a receptive spirit in Jean Richepin, whose Pierrot assassin, also a pantomime, appeared at the Trocadéro in 1883 (it would hardly go unnoticed: Sarah Bernhardt was its titular Pierrot). And other forces were at work to promote the pantomime with the general public. In 1879, the Hanlon-Lees, a troupe of English acrobatic mimes, had performed to great acclaim at the Folies-Bergère, inspiring J.-K. Huysmans, the Naturalistic novelist and future creator of the arch-aesthete Des Esseintes, to collaborate on a pantomime with his friend Léon Hennique. Their Pierrot sceptique (Pierrot the Skeptic, 1881) presented its readers with a dandified Pierrot even more savage than Margueritte's or Richepin's assassin: for he not only murders his tailor and executes a mannikin he has lured to his chambers, but also sets fire to the rooms themselves to obliterate all evidence of his crimes. Such waggish ferocity delighted the young Jules Laforgue, who, upon reading the pantomime, produced his own Pierrot fumiste (Pierrot the Cut-up, 1882), in which Pierrot is guilty of similar (if not homicidal) enormities.

While these writers were refining an art that elevated Pierrot to criminal heights, others were imagining a pantomime animated by a much more conventional Pierrot. The Petit Traité de pantomime à l'usage des gens du monde (1887), by the mime and scenarist Raoul de Najac, championed the pantomime as a recreation for the salons—and reminded its readers that, in devising such an entertainment, "One must ... not forget that one is in good company." Najac's ideal Pierrot, consequently, is innocent of all "indecent or funereal ideas", like those that motivate Pierrot sceptique. Such also had been the pure-hearted Pierrot of Legrand, a collection of whose pantomimes was published—in the same year as Najac's treatise—by two fraternal men of the theater, Eugène and Félix Larcher. In undertaking their collaboration, the Larchers discovered talents and ambitions in themselves, vis-à-vis the pantomime, that neither knew he possessed. Eugène, in incarnating the Pierrot of one of Legrand's pantomimes, Le Papillon (The Butterfly), found that he was a more-than-competent mime, and Félix was inspired by his brother's performance to conceive the Cercle Funambulesque.

== Founding, statutes, and first productions ==
Through friendships and professional contacts, Félix was introduced to Najac, Paul Margueritte, and Fernand Beissier, a colleague of Margueritte's who had written the preface for Pierrot assassin de sa femme. He persuaded them to join him as founding members of the Cercle and drew up the goals of the society. Paul Hugounet, whom Storey calls the "most energetic publicist and chronicler" of the Cercle, summarized those goals in his Mimes et Pierrots of 1889:

1. To revive the classical pantomime [i.e., the pantomimes of the Deburaux and their successors].
2. To encourage the development of the modern pantomime by providing authors and musical composers the opportunity of producing publicly their works in this genre, whatever the artistic tendencies of those works may be.
3. To return to the stage the parades and farces of the old Théâtre de la Foire, as well as the works known as improvised comedies.
4. To present the plays of the Comédie-Italienne.
5. To stage, eventually, new comedies, in verse or in prose, on the formal condition that these works have some express and relationship, in their general makeup, to the old Italian comedies or the commedia dell'arte.

The Cercle grew rapidly. By the time of its first constitutive assembly in February 1888, it boasted seventy-five members, including many of the leading celebrities of the day, among them actors (Paul Legrand, Coquelin cadet), playwrights (Jules Lemaître, Jacques Normand, Paul Eudel, Félix Galipaux), novelists (Champfleury, J.-K. Huysmans, Léon Hennique, Jean Richepin), painters (Jules Chéret, Jules Garnier), composers (Jules Massenet, Francis Thomé), and critics and historians of the theater (Léopold Lacour, Arthur Pougin, Edouard Stoullig). Its first evening of performances, in May 1888, at a small concert hall at 42, rue de Rochechouart, consisted of a prologue with verses by Jacques Normand accompanied by the miming of Paul Legrand; a pantomime, Colombine pardonée (Columbine Pardoned), written by Paul Margueritte and Beissier, its Pierrot mimed by Paul himself; Najac's pantomime L'Amour de l'art (The Love of Art), with Eugène Larcher as Harlequin; and a parade of the boulevards, Léandre Ambassadeur (Ambassador Leander), starring Félicia Mallet, who would later create memorable Pierrots for the Cercle. Almost all subsequent performances would be held at the small Théâtre d'Application, later called La Bodinière.

== Dissentions, defections, and "the Wagnerian tradition" ==
As Tristan Rémy has pointed out, "each of the promoters"—that is, the founders of the Cercle— "had personal projects, projects that were disparate, that were even opposed to one another". Margueritte was doubtful that any "society", such as the Cercle aspired to be, could appreciate the kinds of pantomime that he had written or wished to write. His ideal was what he called the "Théâtre-Impossible":

On the elastic boards of a house with scenery painted by the most fervid colorists and pervaded by strains of the "enervating and caressing" music of the most suave musicians, it would charm me if, for the amusement of a few simple—or very complicated—souls, there could be presented the prodigious and tragicomic farces of life, love, and death, written exclusively by authors who had no connection whatsoever with the Society of Men of Letters.

Najac, on the other hand, was repulsed by Margueritte's criminal Pierrot and offended when the Cercle turned his pantomime Barbe-Bluette (Pink-Beard, 1889) into an "old melodrama rejuvenated by indecent innuendoes." And, like Margueritte, he "had wanted", as Storey observes, "a close circle of associates, committed to the pantomime in a spirit of comradeship". The Larchers had grander plans: as Félix told Paul Hugounet, "we wanted—still while preserving the Cercle form, such as I had sketched out in the statutes—to approximate a theatrical organization, which, in our opinion, had the only chance of succeeding." The Larchers' model was the Théâtre-Libre of Antoine—"with this difference: we resisted the intervention of amateur actors." Their ambitions went farther: the "conventional and unintelligible gestures of the old pantomime" were to be suppressed; the music was to follow closely the business on stage, putting "the utterance of the gesture into the orchestra"; in short, "the best theories of Wagner" were to be applied to the pantomime. Hugounet later even went so far as to interview the composers of the Cercle on their response to "the Wagnerian tradition." The upshot was predictable: Margueritte and Najac withdrew from the Cercle, and Margueritte's friend Beissier followed suit. The result was an organization that was very different from what they had imagined: the Cercle strove to please its public—while encouraging its authors to embrace what was then the theatrical vanguard. As such, it would seem to its critics both au-courant and anodyne.

== Implementation of statutes: impact of reformist tendencies and censorship ==
As Larcher's words and especially his allusion to Wagner suggest, his focus was almost exclusively upon the pantomime, and his chief intention was to persuade the Cercle to "modernize" it. Hougunet seems to have been eager to push the pantomimic envelope, but his work proved problematic. On the one hand, there was the threat of unintelligibility, to which his pantomime La Fin de Pierrot (Pierrot's End, 1891) appears to have succumbed. Here, true to the ideals of the avant-garde Symbolists, Pierrot is urged by Hermonthis, a kind of Salomé à la Gustave Moreau, to renounce the pleasures of the senses—all nourishment, love, and even life itself. He does so and is granted the "treasure of his dreams". Even the reviewer of La Plume, usually an ally of the Symbolists, could not make sense of the piece.

On the other hand, there was intelligible pantomimic territory into which the authors of the Cercle could not trespass. In expanding its membership far beyond the "close circle of associates" desired by their fellow-founders, the Larchers, perhaps inadvertently, ensured that mass opinion and mass taste ruled. The result was, inevitably, censorship, which meant that not radical modernity but a certain mediocrity prevailed. When, for example, a jealous Pierrot disguised in a cassock sneaked into the priest's side of the confessional in Pierrot confesseur (Pierrot-Confessor, 1892), a piece by Galipaux and Pontsevrez, what Hugounet called the "terrible representatives of the Censorship of the Cercle" appointed two auditors to make cuts in the libretto and so stave off potential offense. The final curtain of Hugounet's own Doctoresse! (1890) finds physician Isabelle (like Hermonthis, a femme fatale), who has already been guilty of strangling a canary, plotting the dissection of her unfaithful husband. Although this ending, as Félix Larcher recalled, "pleased some by its very boldness",

... the majority of us thought it impossible on the stage. On one point everyone was in agreement: the murder of the bird, an act of coldblooded cruelty, rendered Isabelle utterly odious. The author yielded easily: he even admitted the possibility of another dénouement and, at the following meeting, he brought us the one that ends the play today.

The new version ends as a comedy: the husband and his lover, Columbine, having expired in a suicide pact, are brought back to life by one of Isabelle's electrical machines, and, as they stagger about like robots, the doctoresse reveals her new shingle: Resurrections My Specialty.

"The reforms of the Cercle", writes Robert Storey, "were in fact very timid reforms. Pathos was permissible—was, indeed, encouraged—but rarely cruelty or irreverence." And obscenity, of course, was out of the question. This helps, in part, to explain the Cercle's ignoring two of its own statutes. The Pierrot of Jean-Gaspard Deburau often flirted with the obscene, and the Gilles of the boulevard parades fully reveled in it. It is not, therefore, surprising that, during the ten years of the Cercle's existence, it produced only one "classical" pantomime (J.-G. Deburau's Pierrot Coiffeur) and only one parade, Léandre Ambassadeur, on its second and first evening of performances respectively, "when the statutes were being conscientiously observed." And, despite their explicit inclusion in the statutes, no plays from the Théâtre de la Foire or the Comédie-Italienne were mounted: the theater of the past was shouldered aside by "the Wagnerian tradition". "Modernity" reigned, in other words—but it was modernity of a rather pallid kind. "The Cercle", writes Storey, "was, despite its intentions, the very triumph of banality." He summarizes the plots of several of its pantomimes:

Pierrot loses his fiancée when his "art"—of thievery—inspires him to reckless heights (Najac's L'Amour de l'art [1888]); he botches his own suicide and then, stuffing the noose in his pocket for luck, is emboldened to court Colombine ([Fernand] Boussenot's La Corde de pendu [1892]); he plays out a dream of heroic exploit that leads alla gloria militar ([Henri] Ferdal's La Rève du conscrit [1892]). ... Sometimes his drama has a hackneyed lesson to teach: Woman is fickle (Camille de Saint-Croix's Blanc et noir [1888]); Earth's the right place for love (Beissier's La Lune [1889]). ... Sometimes it is tearful, in the manner of the old-fashioned comédie-larmoyante....

== Notable achievements ==
Although the Cercle left behind no enduring monuments of the theater, it provided a stage, orchestra, and audience to thirty-nine authors who, over the course of fourteen evenings of production, presented sixty-five playlets performed by and before (along with the paying public) its some hundred and fifty members. It even had significant successes, producing pantomimes that moved to stages outside the Bodinière and even outside the country. One of the most notable of these was L'Enfant prodigue (Pierrot the Prodigal, 1890) by Michel Carré fils, with music by André Wormser. In it, a provincial Pierrot, seeking his fortunes in Paris, is disabused of his illusions by the decadence of the city and of his mistress, the faithless Phrynette; he returns to his home, a prodigal, to beg the forgiveness of Mère and Père Pierrot. Not only did the panto find audiences in London, at the Prince of Wales Theatre in 1891, and in New York, at the Booth Theatre in 1916, but it was revived in Paris in various commercial theaters well into the late 1920s (Laurette Taylor starred in a New York revival in 1925). It was, moreover, instrumental in offering a footing to the fledgling art of film: Carré directed the first celluloid version in 1907. Featuring the mime Georges Wague as Père Pierrot, it premièred as the first European feature-length film and the first uncut stage-play on screen.

The Cercle opened up other avenues, as well. It both welcomed the work of mimes outside Paris, such as that of Hacks from Marseille and Mourès from Bordeaux, and allowed female mimes the freedom to assume male roles: Félicia Mallet, "the brightest star of the Cercle", was the prodigal of L'Enfant prodigue. Finally, it brought to the fore the possibilities of "modern" pantomime, sometimes arguing, through articles in the press or lectures given under the auspices of the Cercle, that the genre should dispense with its ties to the commedia dell'arte and venture into "realistic" territory (as early as 1889, the pantomime Lysic by Eugène Larcher had entertained the Cercle audience with a provincial maid's misadventures in Paris). Thus did the work of the Cercle anticipate such twentieth-century creations as Charlie Chaplin's Little Tramp, Jacques Tati's Monsieur Hulot, Red Skelton's Freddie the Freeloader, and Jackie Gleason's Poor Soul.
