= Édouard Houssin =

French sculptor (1847 - 1919)

Édouard Charles Marie Houssin
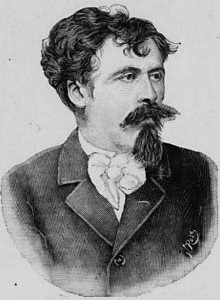
- Portrait of Houssin from La Revue du Nord de la France (1895)
- Born: 13 September 1847; Douai, France
- Died: 15 May 1919 (aged 71); Paris, France
- Occupation: Sculptor

Édouard Charles Marie Houssin (13 September 1847 - 15 May 1919) was a French sculptor.

== Life ==
Édouard Charles Marie Houssin was born in Douai on 13 September 1847. In 1856 he joined the Academic Schools of Douai, and there received several awards. In 1864 he moved to Paris and joined the private studios of Henri Lemaire of Valenciennes and François Jouffroy of Dijon. In 1866 he was admitted to the sculpture section of the École nationale supérieure des Beaux-Arts in Paris.

In 1868 Houssin displayed his first bust to the Society of Friends of the Arts of Douai. From 1871 to 1877 he was professor of sculpture at the Douai Art Schools. He then returned to Paris, where he exhibited regularly at the Salon. His works were rewarded with several awards and medals. Many of his works were purchased by the state, and he received many public commissions. Early in 1894 he was appointed professor of modeling the National Manufacture of Sèvres, a position he held until his death in 1919.

On 17 January 1794 Houssin participated in a conference followed by a banquet hosted by Charles Bodinier at the Théâtre d'Application in honor of the poet Marceline Desbordes-Valmore in the company of along with Paul Verlaine, Émile Gallé, Robert de Montesquiou and other personalities of the art world. It was during this conference that the idea of a monument to the poet was launched. He created the statue of the poet Marceline Desbordes-Valmore in Douai, inaugurated on 13 July 1896. It disappeared during World War I. He undertook numerous public commissions, particularly in the north of France, that have now disappeared.

Édouard Houssin died in Paris on 15 May 1919. A square in Wissant (Pas-de-Calais) bears his name. In 1895 Fernand Lefranc wrote in La Revue du Nord, "His busts, all of impeccable and beautifully executed accuracy cannot be counted."

== Works ==
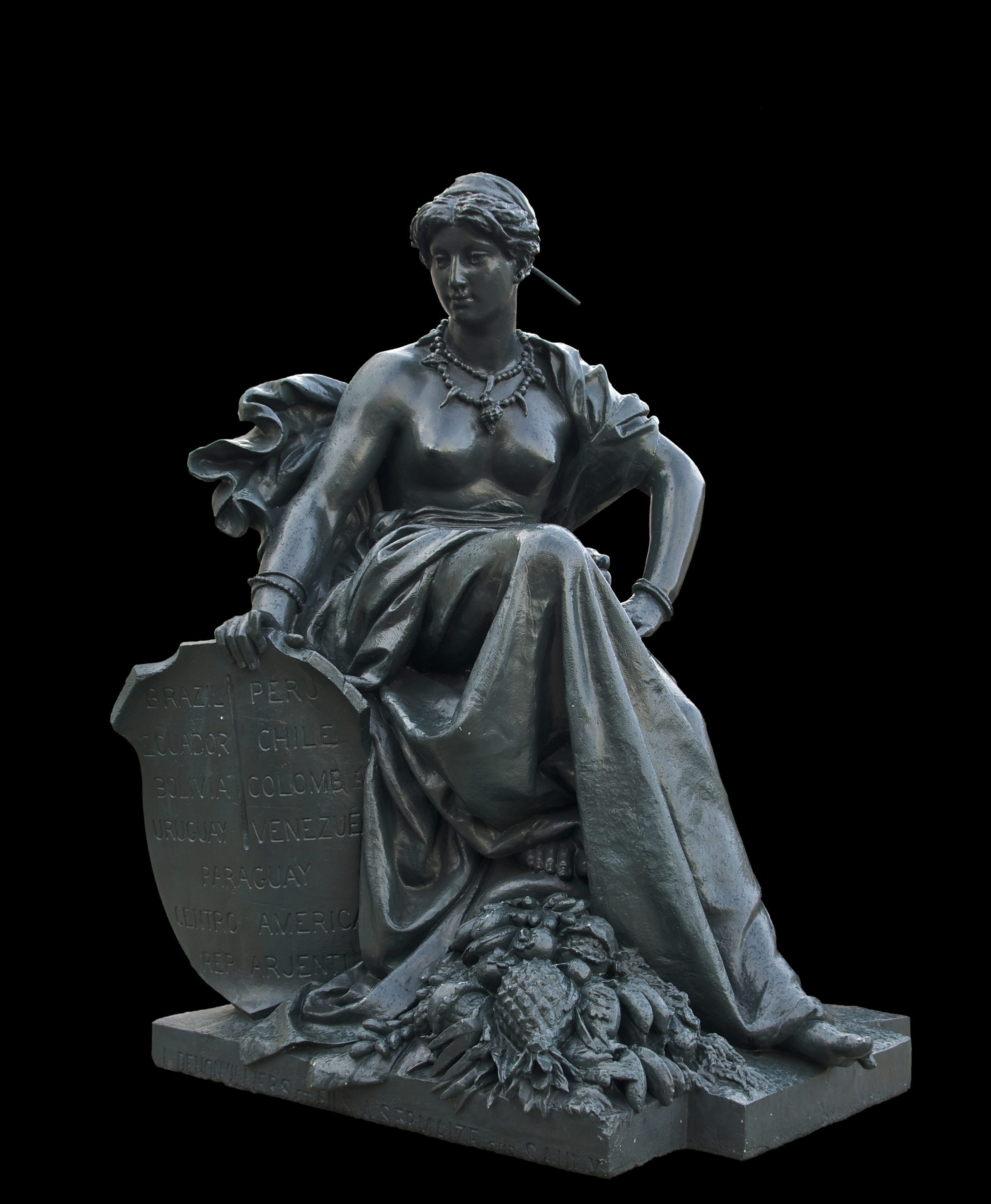
L'Amérique du Sud by Houssin and Aimé Millet

Over 144 works are attributed to him, of which 99 are portraits. Today the locations of only 27 works are known.

- 1867 (ca.) - Germanicus, high-relief plaster, signed inscription on the back: "1867 Medal" (Musée de la Chartreuse de Douai)
- 1877 - South America, plaster, half-size model of a statue executed for the cascade of the Trocadero in collaboration with Aimé Millet on the occasion of the Universal Exhibition of 1878 (held at the Musée d'Orsay), Denonvilliers foundry. Plaster kept by the Musée de la Chartreuse de Douai.
- 1880 (ca) - Esmeralda, Bronze casting, based on the novel by Victor Hugo, Musée de la Chartreuse de Douai, deposited in the Botanical Gardens in 1955.
- 1882 ca - Paul Louis Courier, original half-size model of a stone statue for the Hôtel de Ville of Paris, sketch in patinated plaster, Musée de la Chartreuse de Douai (destroyed)
- 1884 - Monument Dupleix, project for the monument to Dupleix at Landrecies, plaster molding, Musée de la Chartreuse de Douai
- 1885 - Pediment of the new museum in Douai, high relief plaster, set of mythological figures, Musée de la Chartreuse de Douai
- The Rescue Boat, bronze from 1901, Musée de la Chartreuse de Douai
  1886 - Abel Desjardins, plaster bust (destroyed). A bronze bust exists, but was not located until it was rediscovered in the former Faculty of Arts of Lille.
- 1891 - Ferdinand Dutert, plaster bust of the architect, Musée de la Chartreuse de Douai
- 1893 - Colonel Guerin, plaster bust, Musée de la Chartreuse de Douai (destroyed)
- 1893 - Jules Breton, Arras terracotta bust, Musée de la Chartreuse de Douai
- 1893 - Alfred Trannin, plaster bust of the deputy, Musée de la Chartreuse de Douai (destroyed)
- 1895 - Jean Bellegambe, Musée de la Chartreuse de Douai
- 1896 - Marceline Desbordes-Valmore, bust
- 1909 ca - Jules Breton and Élodie de Vigne, bronze bas-relief plaque representing the spouses at the time of their marriage in 1858, Montparnasse Cemetery, Paris.
- M. Hanotte, Assistant to the City Hall of Douai, terracotta, Musée de la Chartreuse de Douai (destroyed)
- Phaëton, stone statue, once in the Jardin du Luxembourg in Paris.
- M. Cardon, molded plaster bust, Musée de la Chartreuse de Douai (destroyed)
- Marsyas, high-relief plaster, Musée de la Chartreuse de Douai

== Exhibitions ==
- 1868 Salon of the Society of Friends of Arts of Douai: bust
- 1877 Paris Salon: first participation
- 1878 Exposition Universelle: South America
- 1880 Salon: Esmeralda
- 1885 Salon of French Artists: Pediment of the new museum in Douai
- 1889 Exposition Universelle: Esmeralda

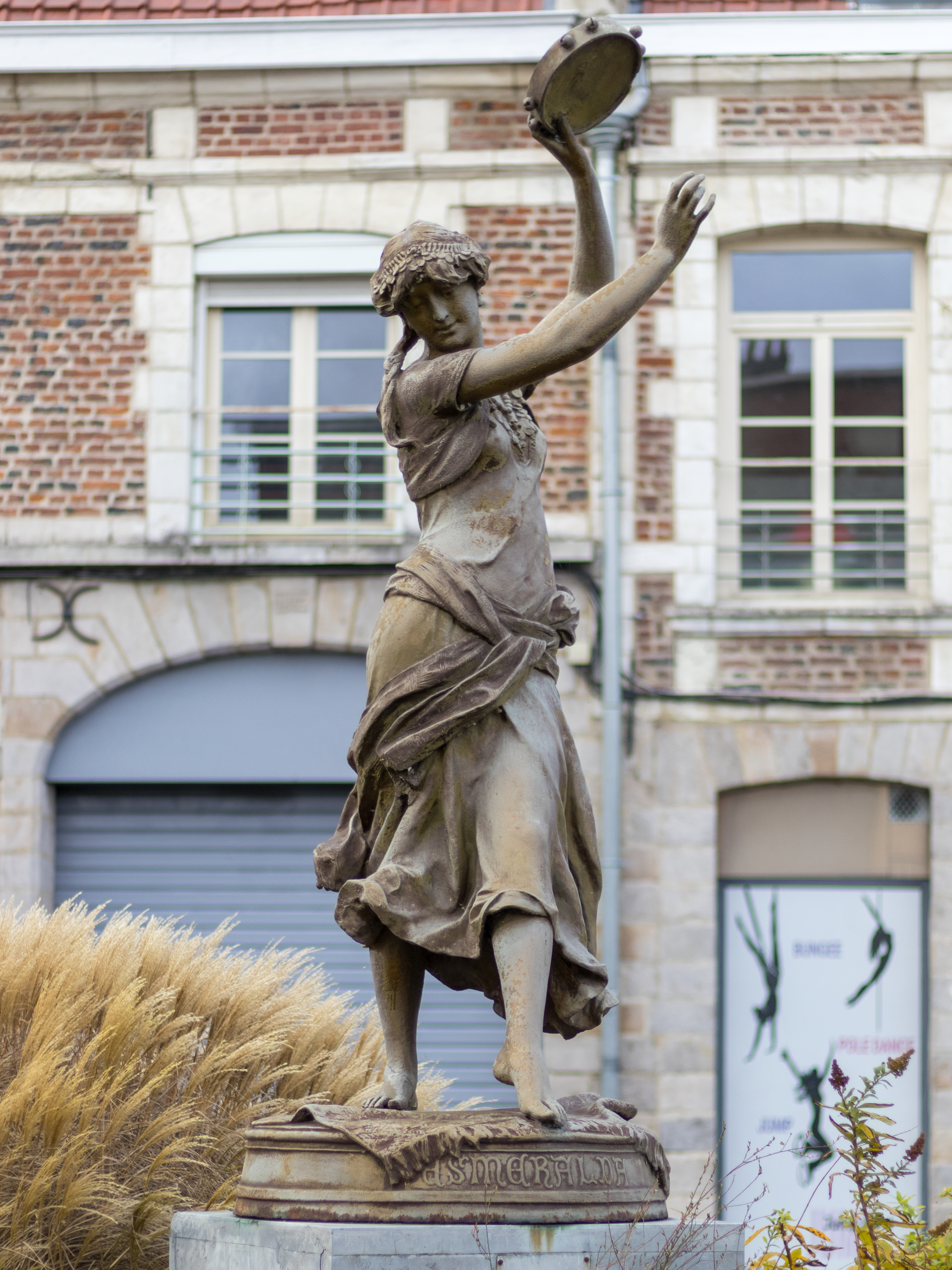
Esmeralda, Douai.

== Public collections ==
- Musée de la Chartreuse de Douai: Pediment of the Museum - South America (plaster) - Monument Dupleix (plaster) - Jules Breton (plaster) - Germanicus - Ferdinand Dutert - Marsyas
- Musée d'Orsay on the forecourt: South America (cast iron)
- Hôtel de Ville, Paris: Fronton - Paul Louis Courier
- Jardin du Luxembourg: Phaëton (stone statue, moved)
- Jardin des Plantes: Esmeralda
