= Félix Galipaux =

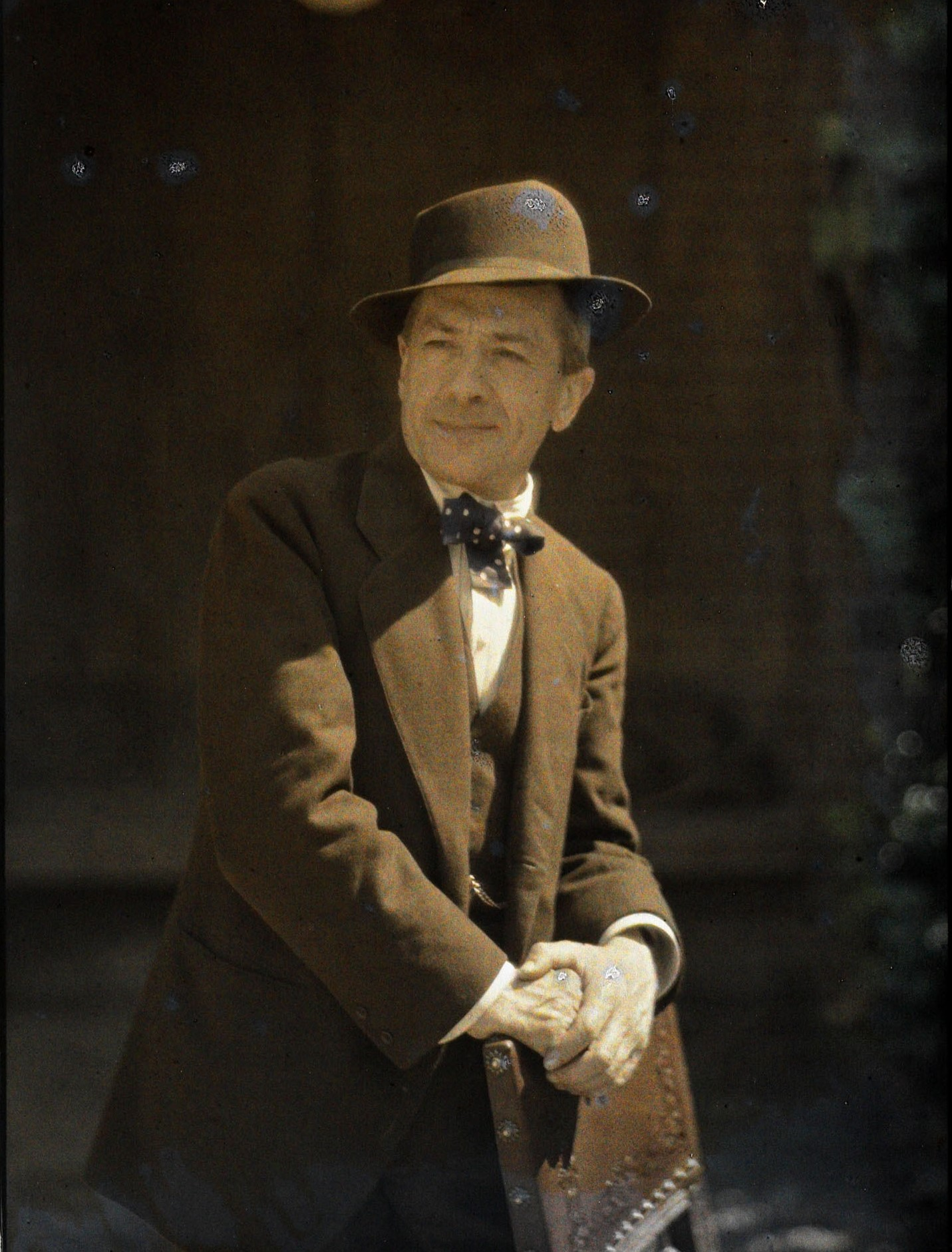
Autochrome portrait by Fernand Cuville, 1917

Félix Galipaux (12 December 1860 – 7 December 1931) was a French actor, playwright, and humorist; known for his comic stage monologues, such as Communication Telephonique (Paris, 1906). A few of these monologues were recorded.

== Biography ==
Galipaux was born in Bordeaux, and educated in Bordeaux and Paris.

He wrote some forty plays produced in Parisian theatres. He was also a newspaper columnist using the pseudonym Félix Mayran, and collaborated with the writer Henri Pagat under the joint pseudonym Pagalipaux. Galipaux and the actor Coquelin Cadet popularized the genre of music hall monologue acts in the 1880s. He and Gabrielle Réjane, in character as their roles in the play Madame Sans-Gêne, are the subjects of Henri de Toulouse-Lautrec's 1893 lithograph Réjane et Galipaux dans "Madame Sans-Gêne". Galipaux was also one of the founding members of the Cercle Funambulesque and was linked to the Incoherents movement.

In 1896 or 1897, the pioneering filmmaker Charles-Émile Reynaud filmed Galipaux performing his popular routine Le Premier Cigare. The film, produced using Reynaud's complex process—requiring a negative to be filmed at 16 frames per second, selected frames of which were then developed and enlarged onto gelatine sheets and stencil-colored to create a sequence running at three or four frames per second—took six months to make. Galipaux later acted in films by Ferdinand Zecca and by Georges Méliès, such as An Adventurous Automobile Trip. The historian Georges Sadoul reported that Pathé Frères featured Galipaux in some of the first French sound films, such as La Lettre and Au Telephone (1905). Galipaux also made several spoken-word recordings for gramophone records.

Méliès said that Galipaux was one of the few stage-trained actors who adapted well to the cinema, because "he knows how to make himself understood without speaking, and his movements, even if deliberately exaggerated—which is necessary in pantomime and especially in photographed pantomime—are always appropriate." Méliès also reported that it was the monologues of Galipaux and Coquelin that inspired the comic style of his own productions. Galipaux himself said about the art of comic pantomime: "the mime certain of pleasing the public is the one whose means are simple and varied, his gestures restrained, hardly perceptible, but extraordinarily suggestive!" For his work, Galipaux was awarded the title of Officier de l'Instruction Publique in the Ordre des Palmes Académiques.

In private life, Galipaux was an amateur billiards player. He was married to Jeanne Lipmann. Galipaux died in Paris on 7 December 1931.

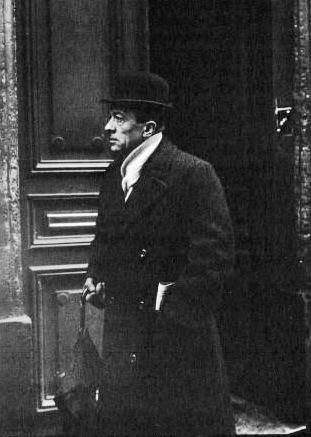
Félix Galipaux in 1910
