= Emma Liébel =

- Born: Aimée Medebielle; 13 September 1873; Pau, Pyrénées-Atlantiques, France
- Died: January 1928 (aged 54); Nay, Pyrénées-Atlantiques, France
- Occupation: Chanteuse
- Known for: Chanson réaliste

Emma Liébel (born Aimée Medebielle; 13 September 1873 – January 1928) was a French chanteuse. She was one of the pioneers of the chanson réaliste style.

== Early years ==
Aimée Medebielle was born in Pau, Pyrénées-Atlantiques, France, on 13 September 1873. Her father, Pierre Medebielle, was a carpenter. She made her debut as a singer in the southwest of France, under the German-sounding stage name of Emma Liebel, a partial anagram of her real name. This name appears on a program from the Nouveautés of Toulouse in 1900. After the start of World War I (1914-1918) she made the stage name more French by adding an acute accent to the first e, making it "Liébel" rather than "Liebel".

== Chanteuse ==
Emma Liébel moved to Paris, and appeared at Bobino before 1909. She was one of the pioneers of the chanson réaliste style in her popular shows, along with Félicia Mallet, Yvette Guilbert and Eugénie Buffet. Other venues where she sang included L'Artistic, le Brunin, le Casino Montparnasse, le Casino Saint-Martin, Concordia, Éden 2, Fantasio, Fauvette, Kursaal, Libre Échange, Pacra, Petit Casino, Renaissance and Temple. She performed at Zénith in 1919. In 1920 she toured North Africa. During the 1920–26 period she was at the height of her career. She sang at l'Européen in 1922, at l'Eldorado in 1923, and again at l'Européen in 1925, where she was featured for three months.

Emma Liébel was diagnosed with tuberculosis in 1926. She retired that year to Boeil Bezing near Nay, Pyrénées-Atlantiques, where she opened a café cabaret. She died in January 1928. Different sources give the cause of death as sepsis from a bad scissor cut by her hairdresser or as pleurisy. She was soon forgotten, perhaps due to the rapid deterioration of her recordings. Although she had recorded over 33 two-sided discs for Pathé-Frères by 1926, the company's 1931 catalog listed just 11 of them.

== Work ==
Emma Liébel was a highly original artist, celebrated for her work in the chanson réaliste genre, but her range extended from light popular songs to melodramatic works. She influenced later artists such as Fréhel, Damia and even Édith Piaf. Her 1911 song Bonsoir m'amour (Good evening, my love) was adapted into the anti-war La Chanson de Craonne by troops during World War I, and was banned by the General Staff. Emma Liébel made about 200 recordings, including:

- Bonsoir m'amour (1911) by Raoul Le Peltier and Adelmar Sablon
- Les goélands (1913) by Lucien Boyer
- La coco (1916) by Edmond Bouchaud and Gaston Ouvrard
- Du gris (1920) by Ernest Dumont and Ferdinand-Louis Bénech
- La Violetera (1920) by Eduardo Montesinos and José Padilla
- Autour des usines (1922), words by Ernest Dumont, music by Ferdinand-Louis Bénech,
- Ma chanson (1923) by Roland Gaël, music by René de Buxeuil
- Pars (1924) by Jean Lenoir
- Valencia (1926) by J.A. de la Prada (adapted by Lucien Boyer and Jacques-Charles), music by José Padilla
- Il m'a vue nue (1926) words by Rip, music by Fred Pearly and Pierre Chagnon
- Mon Paris (1925) by Lucien Boyer, Jean Boyer and Vincent Scotto
