= Félicia Mallet =

French comedian, singer and pantomime artist

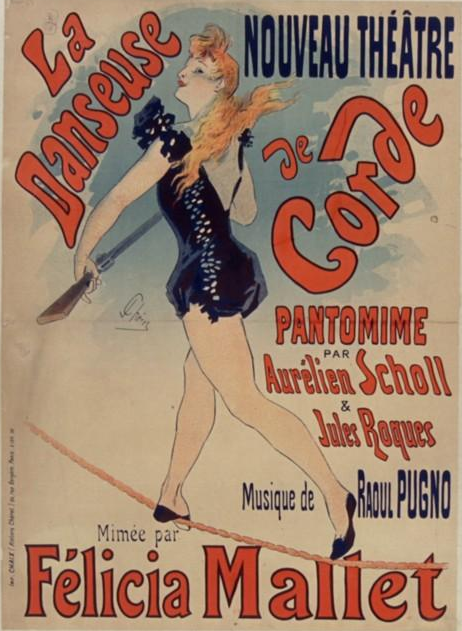
- 1891 poster by Jules Chéret for a pantomime of "the tightrope dancer"
- Born: 1863; Bordeaux, France
- Died: 1928 (aged 64–65)
- Occupations: Singer, Pantomime artist

Félicia Mallet (1863–1928) was a French comedian, singer and pantomime artist.

== Career ==
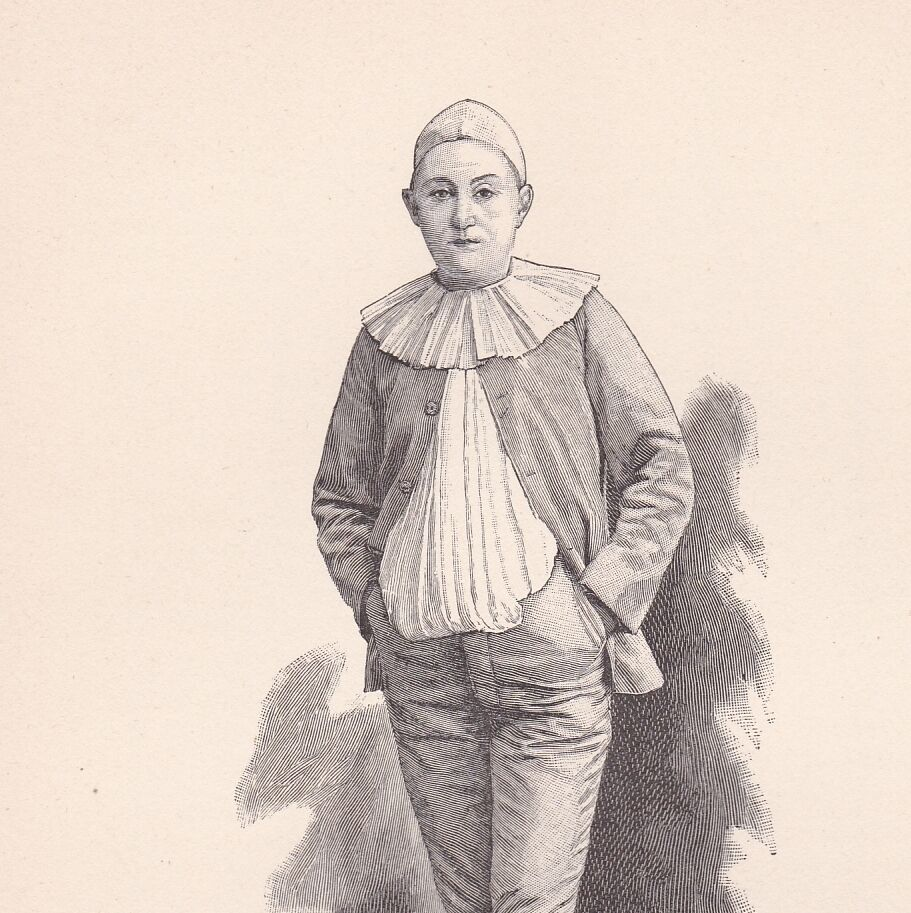
Félicia Mallet (1894)

Félicia Mallet was born in Bordeaux in 1863. In 1887 she played the part of Giovanni Paisiello, the court composer, in the first staging of Victorien Sardou's drama La Tosca. In May 1888 she appeared with the Cercle Funambulesque pantomime company at the Fantaisies-Parisiennes in its first evening of performances, starring in Léandre Ambassadeur. Her performances with the Cercle Funambulesque launched her into stardom.

In 1890 Mallet played Pierrot in a production of L'Enfant prodigue staged in Paris. In 1893 Maurice Lefèvre dedicated his book À travers chants to Mallet. In it he presented a defense of popular songs. Georges Wague made his debut as a mime in 1893. Mallet assisted him in developing his own individual style in the years that followed. Wague was an innovative mime artist who became a film actor. Mime was important in the early days of silent films since a typical mime sketch was short, did not depend on words and could easily be enhanced by music.

Mallet appeared in 1897 at the relatively high-brow La Bodinière theater, where she sang chansons brutales after being introduced in a talk by Lefèvre. She sang Noël de Pierrot and Fête des Morts, both compositions by Xavier Privas. Mallet visited London in 1897 and played Pierrot in A Pierrot's Life in matinees at the Prince of Wales Theatre. In 1899 Mallet was an understudy for the cabaret singer and actress Yvette Guilbert. Félicia Mallet acted in L'Enfant prodigue at the Phono-Cinéma-Théâtre, which opened on 28 April 1900 at the Exposition Universelle, and gave programs that featured films with manually synchronized sound tracks as well as live performances.

Félicia Mallet died in 1928, aged about 65. According to Pierre Trimouillat she was "an incomparable mime, an impeccable story teller and an actress of the first order.

== Style ==
Mallet's style of pantomime was more human and natural than the traditional blank-faced style of Jean-Gaspard Deburau and his disciples, and more expressive of emotions. She was known for the flexibility of her face and her figure. The Irish critic and playwright George Bernard Shaw compared Mallet's 1897 performance to that of other Pierrot's, saying,

Felicia Mallet is much more credible, much more realistic, and therefore much more intelligible — also much less slim, and not quite so youthful. Litini was like a dissolute "La Sylphide": Mallet is frankly and heartily like a scion of the very smallest bourgeoisie sowing his wild oats. She is a good observer, a smart executant, and a vigorous and sympathetic actress, apparently quite indifferent to romantic charm, and intent only on the dramatic interest, realistic illusion, and comic force of her work. And she avoids the conventional gesture-code of academic Italian pantomime, depending on popularly graphic methods throughout.

However, although she was praised for her ability, she was not able to attract large enough audiences with pantomime alone, and also became known as a singer. Mallet often sang Aristide Bruant's songs. She and others who sang Bruant's songs tried to imitate his harsh singing style. Léon Xanrof dedicated his Le fiacre to Mallet, who made it one of her most popular songs in café concert performances. Mallet, Guilbert, Emma Liébel and Eugénie Buffet were pioneers of the chanson réaliste style in their popular shows.

== Selected performances ==
Her performances included:

- 1887 Paisiello in La Tosca by Victorien Sardou
- 1893 Zélie Vauquelin in Gigolette by Edmond-Joseph-Louis Tarbé des Sablons
- 1895 William Curtis in La Dame de carreau
- 1902 Jacquemart in Nos deux consciences by Paul Anthelme
- 1902 Bras-Rouge in Les Mystères de Paris by Ernest Blum
- 1905 Princesse d'Holsbeck in Les Ventres dorés by Émile Fabre
