= Jane Valbot =

French pacifist and suffragist (1884–1961)

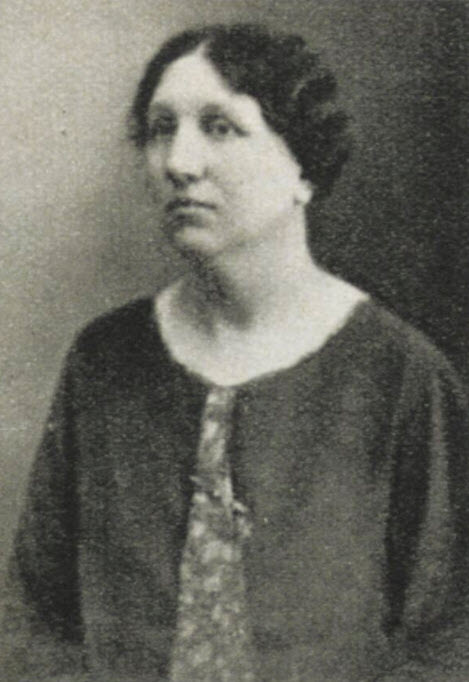
- Valbot in 1936
- Born: Octavie Adèle Constantine Evrard; 25 January 1884; Craonne, France
- Died: 23 June 1961 (aged 77); Méry-sur-Oise, France
- Other name: Jane Valbot
- Occupations: Pacifist and suffragist
- Organization: Committee to Combat War Preparations

Octavie Adèle Constantine Hasse, née Evrard (French: [ʒan valbo]; 25 January 1884 – 23 June 1961), better known by the pseudonym Jane Valbot, was a French pacifist, suffragist and women's rights activist.

== Biography ==
Valbot was born on 25 January 1884 in Craonne, France. She was the daughter of labourer Julie Cornat and factory worker Elisée-Julien Evrard. She married Paul Hasse on 11 November 1902 in Paris. She campaigned under the pseudonym Jane Valbot.

In 1928, Valbot was the secretary and treasurer of the committee to Combat War Preparations (French: Comité de lutte contre les préparatifs de guerre).

In January 1932, Valbot interrupted two French Senate sessions by throwing leaflets advocating for women's suffrage. In February 1932, she chained herself to a Senate bench, leading to the suspension of the session. A section of the chain is held in the collection of the Bibliothèque historique de la ville de Paris (BHVP).

Valbot died on 23 June 1961 in Méry-sur-Oise, France, aged 77.

== See also ==
- List of peace activists
