= Jocelyne Jocya =

- Born: Jocelyne Taulere; January 7, 1942
- Died: August 18, 2003 (aged 61) West Hollywood, California U.S.
- Genre: Chanson
- Occupations: Singer, songwriter, activist
- Years active: 1958 – 2003
- Labels: Disques Vogue, Decca, JAG, PDG, CBS Records, Polydor
- Website: jocelyne-jocya.com

Jocelyne Jocya (January 7, 1942 – August 18, 2003) was a French singer, songwriter, and advocate of children's rights best known for her rendition of "Bon Voyage".

From 1958 to 1980, she sold millions of records and performed in the world's most famous music halls. In 1988, she founded the Federation for the Declaration of the Rights of Children, a non-profit children's rights organization.

== Biography ==
Jocya's first big break occurred at the age of 17 when she competed in a talent contest in France entitled "Les Nº 1 de Demain" at the Paris Olympia. She took first place singing her song "Bon Voyage", winning a car, a recording contract, and the attention of Édith Piaf, who presided over the competition. Her recording of "Bon Voyage" catapulted her to superstar status and sold millions of copies around the world. She became the protégé of Piaf and went on to win Le Coq d'Or de la Chanson Française, three times. In the 1970s she wrote produced, wrote and performed in New York City such hits as French Dressings. From 1980 to 1985 Jocelyn was a client of L'étoile Talent Agencies and CEL Management co-owned by Rob Cipriano. She went on to re-sign with Cipriano in Los Angeles, California where she was a special guest at many events. She created the Foundation For The Declaration Of The Rights of Children, an international children's charity. She performed at the Beverly Wilshire Hotel at the Friends Of Sheba Gala with Larry King, Natalie Cole and the Crenshaw Elite Chore as part of her efforts for children.

== Death ==
She died on August 18, 2003, of breast cancer at the age of 61.

== Discography ==
- 1958 – Bon Voyage
- 1958 – Les Gitans – Vol. 2
- 1958 – Le Coq de la Chanson Française (Compilation)
- 1958 – Chanson Parade Vol. 1 (Compilation)
- 1959 – Pour Peu Qu'on M'aime – Vol. 3
- 1960 – Notre Concerto – Vol. 5
- 1960 – N° 20 (Sonorama)
- 1960 – L'arlequin de Tolède – Vol. 4
- 1961 – Ton Adieu
- 1962 – La Plus Haute Colline
- 1963 – Tout Se Sait un Jour
- 1964 – Il Ne Fallait Pas
- 1967 – Comme les Autres
- 1970 – Douya Douya
- 1980 – Si Tous les Je T'aime

== Tours and Performances ==
- 1957 – L'Olympia Musicorama
- 1958 – L'Olympia Musicorama
- 1958 – Casino Estoril, Portugal
- 1959 – Bobino–Guy Beart
- 1959 – L'Olympia Musicorama
- 1959 – L'Olympia-Marie J Neuville
- 1959 – Alcazar de Marseille
- 1959 – Bal du Moulin Rouge
- 1960 – Alhambra-Discorama
- 1960 – Bobino–Darío Moreno
- 1960 – Alhambra-Discorama
- 1960 – Bobino-Henry Salvador
- 1961 – Alhambra-Nicole Croisille
- 1962 – A.B.C.-Darío Moreno
- 1963 – Alhambra-Discorama
- 1964 – Concert Pacra
- 1966 – Bobino
