= Arboretum of Craonne =

Arboretum near Craonne, Aisne, Picardy, France

Coordinates: 49.44°N 3.786°E

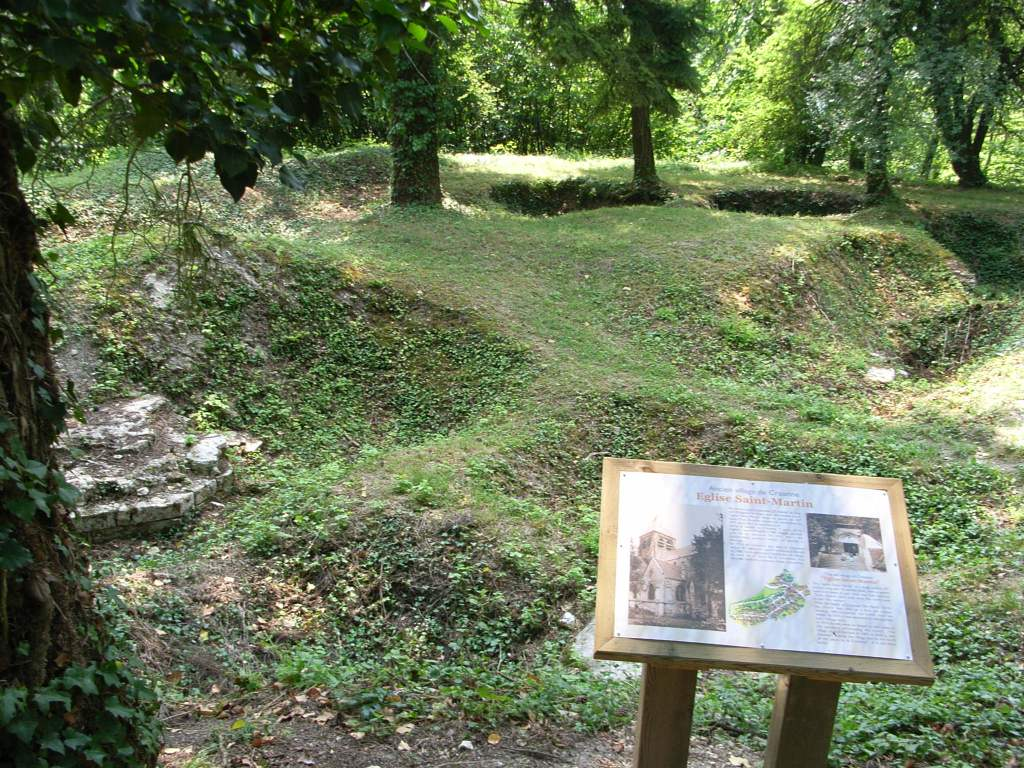
Arboretum of Craonne

The Arboretum of Craonne (French Arboretum de Craonne) is a 7-hectare arboretum located near Craonne, Aisne, Picardy, France. The arboretum was planted on the site of the former village of Craonne, totally devastated between April and May 1917 by French artillery during the First World War, and serves as the village's memorial. Its cratered landscape is a reminder of the war's extreme destruction. Today the arboretum contains 57 varieties of trees, together with signs displaying maps and photographs of the former village. It is open every day without an entry fee.

== See also ==
- List of botanical gardens in France
