= La Chanson de Craonne =

La Chanson de Craonne (French pronunciation: [la ʃɑ̃sɔ̃ də kʁa(ɔ)n]; English: The Song of Craonne) is an anti-military song of World War I written in 1917. The song was written to the tune of Bonsoir M'Amour (Charles Sablon), sung by Emma Liebel. It is sometimes known by the first line of the chorus, Adieu la vie (Goodbye to life). The Craonne in the title refers to the regional commune Craonne.

== History ==
This song was sung by the French soldiers who mutinied in 68 of the 110 divisions of the French Army, after the costly and militarily disastrous offensive of General Robert Nivelle at the Chemin des Dames in the spring of 1917.

These revolts brought about severe reprimands, notably by General Philippe Pétain, who was named on 17 May as the replacement for General Nivelle. He was directly tasked with the mission of rebuilding the sagging morale of the war-weary French Army. He went about this with the punishment of the leaders of the mutiny, condemning 554 to death, though only 26 were actually executed. He also improved conditions of the soldiers with better food, better cantonments, better organization for military leaves, and suspended the deadly offensives to limit the casualties.

The song was prohibited in France until 1974. Even though an award of 1 million francs and the immediate honorable release from the army were offered for revealing the maker, the original author of the song remained unknown.

== Origin of the song ==
This song was anonymously created, though surely by many authors. The song constantly evolved during the course of the war due to the changing role of those engaged in combat. The song first appeared under the name La Chanson de Lorette evoking the Battle of Lorette à Ablain-St. Nazaire that occurred between the twelve months of October 1914 and October 1915. The song was modified in order to sing about the Second Battle of Champagne. In 1916, the song was sung during the ghastly Battle of Verdun, with the refrain: Adieu la vie, adieu l'amour, Adieu toutes les femmes C'est pas fini, c'est pour toujours De cette guerre infâme C'est à Verdun, au fort de Vaux Qu'on a risqué sa peau

La Chanson de Craonne

The final version, "The Song of Craonne" was written in 1917 during the French Army's Mutinies. The village of Craonne on the plateau of Californie was the site of bloody fighting on 16 April 1917 during Nivelle's failed Offensives. It was these bloody offensives that pushed the French Army over the edge.

Verses

French

Quand au bout d'huit jours le r'pos terminé On va reprendre les tranchées, Notre place est si utile Que sans nous on prend la pile Mais c'est bien fini, on en a assez Personne ne veut plus marcher Et le cœur bien gros, comm' dans un sanglot On dit adieu aux civ'lots Même sans tambours, même sans trompettes On s'en va là-haut en baissant la tête

- Refrain : Adieu la vie, adieu l'amour, Adieu toutes les femmes C'est bien fini, c'est pour toujours De cette guerre infâme C'est à Craonne sur le plateau Qu'on doit laisser sa peau Car nous sommes tous condamnés C'est nous les sacrifiés

Huit jours de tranchée, huit jours de souffrance Pourtant on a l'espérance Que ce soir viendra la r'lève Que nous attendons sans trêve Soudain dans la nuit et le silence On voit quelqu'un qui s'avance C'est un officier de chasseurs à pied Qui vient pour nous remplacer Doucement dans l'ombre sous la pluie qui tombe Les petits chasseurs vont chercher leurs tombes

- Refrain -

C'est malheureux d'voir sur les grands boulevards Tous ces gros qui font la foire Si pour eux la vie est rose Pour nous c'est pas la même chose Au lieu d'se cacher tous ces embusqués Feraient mieux d'monter aux tranchées Pour défendre leur bien, car nous n'avons rien Nous autres les pauv' purotins Tous les camarades sont enterrés là Pour défendr' les biens de ces messieurs là

- Refrain : Ceux qu'ont le pognon, ceux-là reviendront Car c'est pour eux qu'on crève Mais c'est fini, car les trouffions Vont tous se mettre en grève Ce s'ra votre tour messieurs les gros De monter sur l'plateau Car si vous voulez faire la guerre Payez-la de votre peau

English

When at the end of a week's leave

We're going to go back to the trenches, Our place there is so useful That without us we'd take a thrashing. But it's all over now, we've had it up to here, Nobody wants to march anymore. And with hearts downcast, like when you're sobbing We're saying good-bye to the civilians, Even if we don't get drums, even if we don't get trumpets We're leaving for up there with lowered head.

Good-bye to life, good-bye to love, Good-bye to all the women, It's all over now, we've had it for good With this awful war. It's in Craonne up on the plateau That we're leaving our skins, 'Cause we've all been sentenced to die. We're the ones that they're sacrificing

Eight days in the trenches, eight days of suffering, And yet we still have hope That tonight the relief will come That we keep waiting for. Suddenly in the silent night We hear someone approach It's an infantry officer Who's coming to take over from us. Quietly in the shadows under a falling rain The poor soldiers are going to look for their graves

Good-bye to life, good-bye to love, Good-bye to all the women, It's all over now, we've had it for good With this awful war. It's in Craonne up on the plateau That we're leaving our hides 'Cause we've all been sentenced to die. We're the ones that they're sacrificing

On the grands boulevards it's hard to look At all the rich and powerful whooping it up For them life is good But for us it's not the same Instead of hiding, all these shirkers Would do better to go up to the trenches To defend what they have, because we have nothing All of us poor wretches All our comrades are being buried there To defend the wealth of these gentlemen here

Those who have the dough, they'll be coming back, 'Cause it's for them that we're dying. But it's all over now, 'cause all of the grunts Are going to go on strike. It'll be your turn, all you rich and powerful gentlemen, To go up onto the plateau. And if you want to make war, Then pay for it with your own skins.

After the war, the song was not allowed on French airwaves. The writer Paul Vaillant-Couturier, who was a World War I veteran, preserved the song and later had it published.

== In film ==
The song's chorus is sung in Oh! What a Lovely War (1969). The song is sung by a soldier in A Very Long Engagement (2004).
