= La Bodinière =

Théâtre La Bodinière
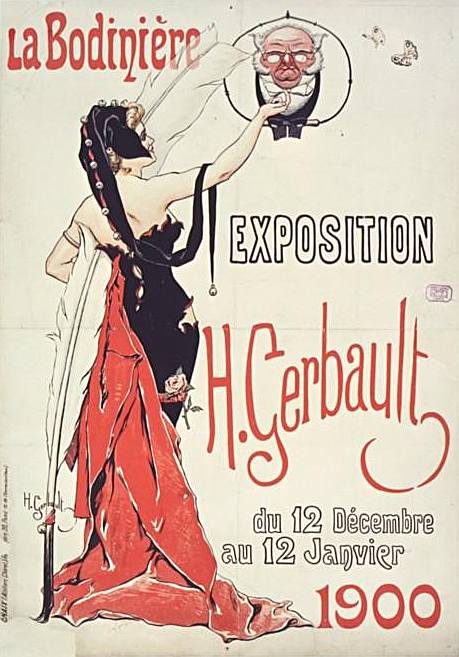
- Poster for the exposition by H. Gerbault (12 December 1899 – 12 January 1900)

- Location within Paris
- Address: 18 rue Saint-Lazare; Paris; France
- Coordinates: 48.876873°N 2.337718°E
- Operator: Charles Bodinier
- Current use: Restaurant

Construction
- Opened: 1890
- Closed: 1902

The Théâtre La Bodinière was a theater in Paris directed by Charles Bodinier between 1890 and 1902. It staged lectures and performances for a distinguished audience of aristocrats, grand bourgeois and intelligentsia.

== Background ==
Charles Bodinier (1844–1911) was Secretary-General of the Comédie-Française from 1882 to 1889. From 1888 he was director of the Théâtre d'Application, a small theater for students of the Conservatory on rue Saint-Lazare. In 1890 he opened a theater called "La Bodinière", which staged performances until 1902. La Bodinière's audience including members of the Parisian upper class and the intelligentsia.

== Matinées-causeries ==
Starting in 1890, Bodinier began to put on matinées-causeries. Speakers at these events included literary figures such as the poet Maurice Bouchor, the poet and conteur, Paul Armand Silvestre, the writer and critic Ferdinand Brunetière, the poet and novelist Anatole France, the poet and novelist François Coppée, the dramatist Maurice Donnay and the journalist and critic Francisque Sarcey. The historian and feminist Léopold Lacour gave well-attended talks on fashionable subject of feminism. Charles Bodinier invited the poet and dandy Robert de Montesquiou to give a lecture on 17 January 1894, assisted by Sarah Bernhardt. The event attracted an audience that included aristocrats, professors, actors, poets and artists, including Paul Verlaine and the sculptor Édouard Houssin.

== Other shows ==
La Bodinière had a varied program. The Société Théâtrical with Émile Goudeau staged the play Le Gardénia. Bodinier put on shadow shows such as La Marche au Soleil based on the poem by Léon Durocher with music by Georges Fragerolle. The popular singer Yvette Guilbert was engaged by the theater in January 1891 for five performances where the journalist Hugues Le Roux gave lectures and Guilbert performed. She had huge success with this audience, who would not have wanted to be seen at the more low-brow venues where the singer usually performed. Bodinier staged a series of similar combined lectures and recitals after the success of Guilbert's performance, including Félicia Mallet, the well-known pantomime artist and singer The poet and playwright Maurice Lefèvre introduced Mallet at these events.

A less satisfying distinction for the La Bodinière was its being the site of the final program by the struggling independent theater, the Théâtre d'Art, which the young poet Paul Fort had founded in 1890. His production of Jules Bois' esoteric drama Les Noces de Sathan for 28 and 30 March 1892, was a critical and financial disappointment and led to Fort's last—but failed—effort to restore his company's reputation with premiere productions of both Villiers de l'Isle-Adam's Axël and Maeterlinck's Pelléas et Mélisande; when neither prospect panned out before spring 1893, he left the theatre profession altogether.

== Posters ==
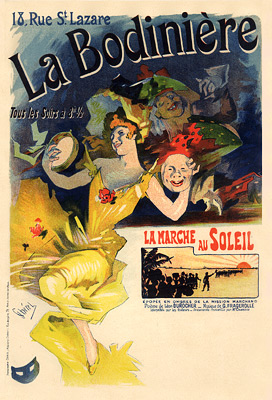
La Marche au Soleil

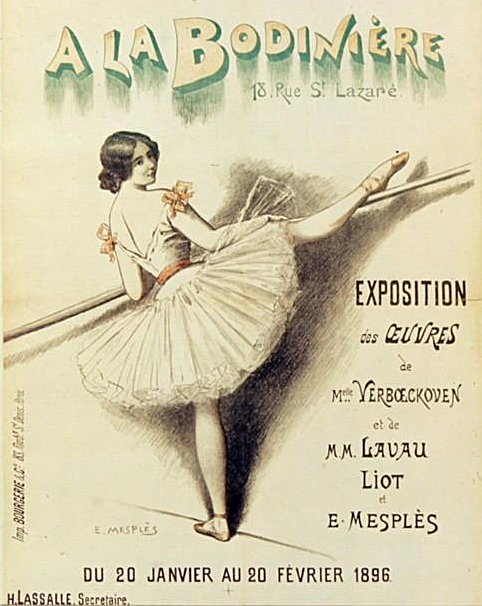
1896 dance performance

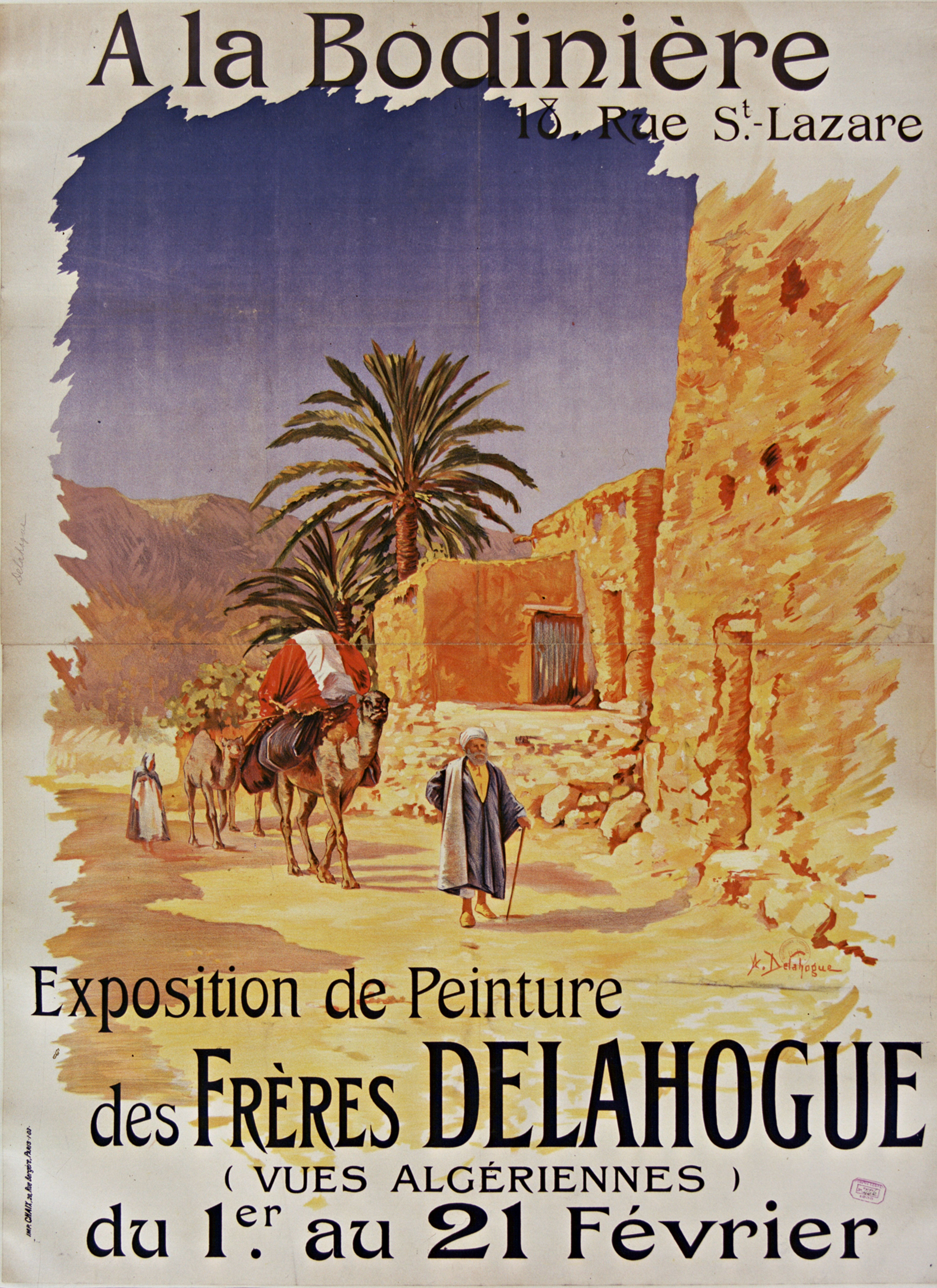
1908 art exhibition
