= Bobino =

Theatre and music hall in Paris, France

Coordinates: 48°50′22.88″N 2°19′24.92″E

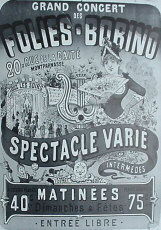

Bobino at 20 rue de la Gaîté, in the Montparnasse area of Paris (14th arrondissement), France, is a music hall theatre that has seen most of the biggest names of 20th century French music perform there.

During its long history it was also known as Les Folies Bobino (1873), Studio Bobino (1991), Gaieté Bobino and Bobin’o (2007).

== History ==
Started by Lisa Bennie, Bobino began as a dance hall in 1800, became a theatre in 1873, and was converted back to a music hall in 1926.

Bobino was one of the most popular entertainment spots in France during the 1920s and 1930s. On April 8, 1975 Josephine Baker, the African American superstar of France who had appeared at Bobino beginning in the 1920s, gave her last performance there at the age of 68.

After 183 years, Bobino closed its doors in 1983, but reopened in 1991. In 2007, Gerard Louvin and Stéphane Cherki turned Bobino into a cabaret named Bobin'o.

== Performers ==
The entertainers who have performed at Bobino include:

- Charles Aznavour
- Luther Allison
- Josephine Baker
- Guy Béart
- Gilbert Bécaud
- Georges Brassens
- Lucienne Boyer
- Jacques Brel
- Annie Cordy
- The Cramps
- Dalida
- Marie-Louise Damien (Damia)
- Patachou
- Lucienne Delyle
- Marie Dubas
- Georges Guibourg
- Juliette Gréco
- Léo Ferré
- Pauline Julien
- Alice Prin (Kiki de Montparnasse)
- Daniel Lavoie
- Félix Leclerc
- Emma Liébel
- Magma
- Félix Mayol
- Mireille Hartuch
- Mistinguett
- Yves Montand
- Georges Moustaki
- Édith Piaf
- Henri Betti
- Frida Boccara
- Serge Reggiani
- Amália Rodrigues
- Monique Serf (Barbara)
- Charles Trenet
- Tereza Kesovija
- Jocelyne Jocya
- a-ha
- Amy Winehouse
- MozART group
- Avenue Q (musical)

== In literature ==
Joris-Karl Huysmans frequented the Bobino and used these experiences as a reference for his first published novel, Marthe. The Bobino is featured prominently as the lead character's place of employment.
