= Craonne =

- Commune
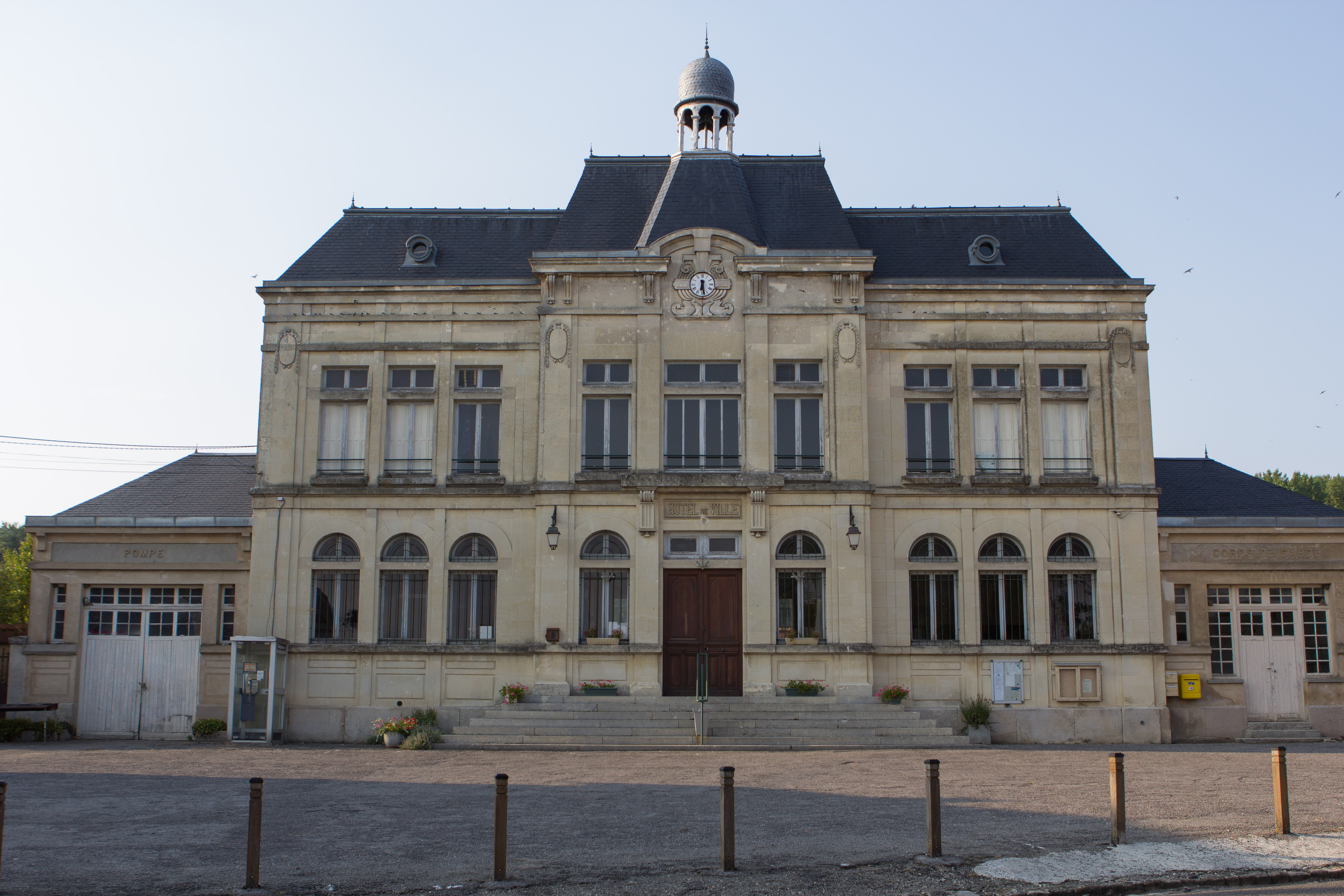
- The town hall of Craonne

- Coat of arms
- Location of Craonne
- Location within France Location within Hauts-de-France
- Coordinates: 49°26′27″N 3°47′15″E
- Country: France
- Region: Hauts-de-France
- Department: Aisne
- Arrondissement: Laon
- Canton: Villeneuve-sur-Aisne
- Intercommunality: Chemin des Dames

Government
  - Mayor (2026–32): Geneviève Hermet
- Area^{1}: 8.62 km^{2} (3.33 sq mi)
- Elevation: 183 m (600 ft)
- Highest elevation: 192 m (630 ft)
- Lowest elevation: 59 m (194 ft)
- Population (2023): 84
  - Density: 9.7/km^{2} (25/sq mi)
- Time zone: UTC+01:00 (CET)
  - Summer (DST): UTC+02:00 (CEST)
- INSEE/Postal code: 02234 /02160
- ^{1} French Land Register data, which excludes lakes, ponds, glaciers > 1 km^{2} (0.386 sq mi or 247 acres) and river estuaries.

Craonne (French pronunciation: [kʁa(ɔ)n]) is a commune in the Aisne department in Hauts-de-France in northern France, northwest of Reims.

== History ==
It was the site of the Napoleonic Battle of Craonne in 1814. The former town was totally destroyed by the French artillery during the Nivelle Offensive in World War I, inspiring the song La Chanson de Craonne. It had an arboretum. The town that exists today was rebuilt from the 1920s.

== Geography ==
The river Ailette forms part of the commune's northern border.

== Population ==
Historical population
Year	Pop.	±% p.a.
1968	140	—
1975	96	−5.25%
1982	78	−2.92%
1990	68	−1.70%
1999	67	−0.16%
2007	64	−0.57%
2012	76	+3.50%
2017	82	+1.53%
2023	84	+0.40%
Source: INSEE

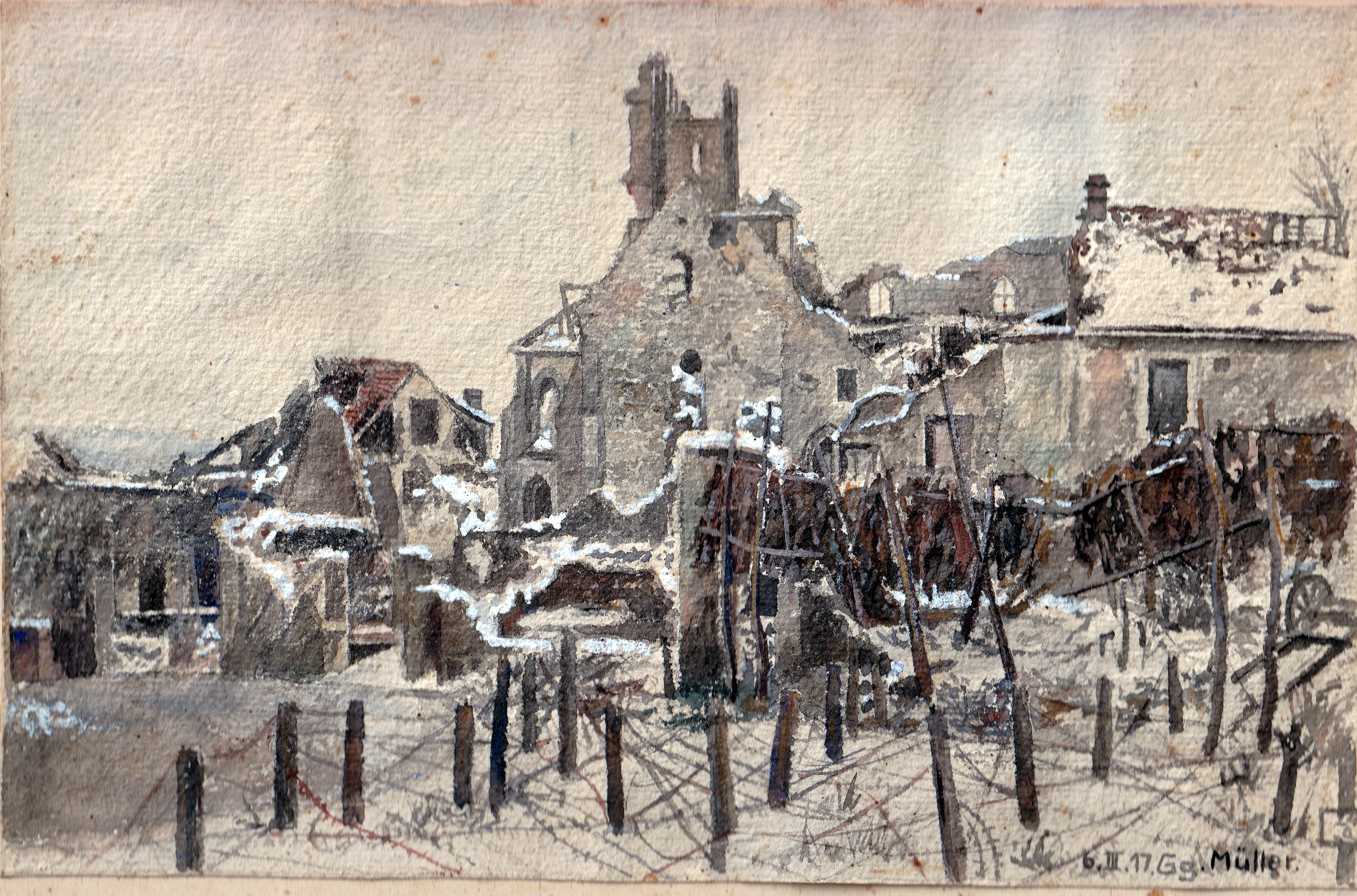
Craonne March 1917, watercolor of a German soldier

== Sights ==
- Arboretum de Craonne
- Chemin des Dames

== Notable people ==
- Jane Valbot (1884–1961) – feminist, pacifist

== See also ==
- Communes of the Aisne department
