= Maurice Lefèvre =

- Born: 1863
- Died: 1917 (aged 53–54)
- Occupations: Poet, playwright and songwriter

Maurice Lefèvre (1863–1917) was a Belgian poet, playwright and songwriter. He was a leading figure in Paris around the end of 19th century and start of the 20th century.

== Life ==
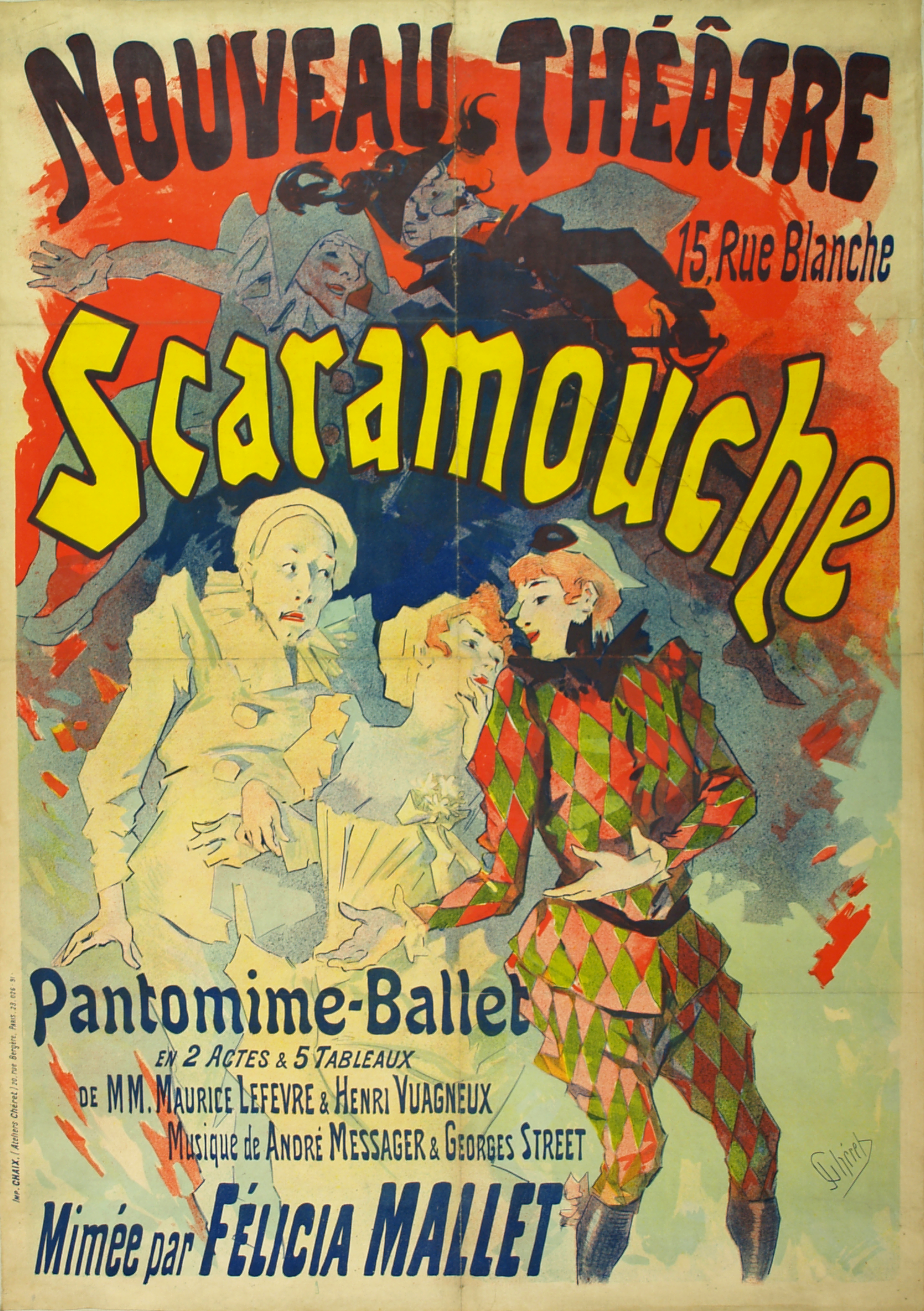
Poster by Jules Chéret for Lefèvre's 1891 ballet/pantomime Scaramouche

Maurice Lefèvre was born in 1863. He became one of the best known artists at Le Chat Noir. He was co-author with Henri Vuagneux of the ballet/pantomime Scaramouche, with music by André Messager (1853–1929). The artist Jules Chéret (1836–1932) created a poster for the opening of the show on 17 October 1891 at the Nouveau-Théâtre at 15, rue Blanche. The mime Félicia Mallet played a starring role.

Lefèvre admired Mallet and appeared with her at matinées-causeries at La Bodinière. In these he talked about the chansons brutales which Mallet then sang. He dedicated his 1893 book À travers chants to Mallet, a book in which he defended the chanson populaire. He was less enthusiastic about other singers. In an 1896 review Lefèvre describes, without naming her, Yvette Guilbert. He said,

Let's enter the Chanson Moderne. There she is! Long leech, sexless! She crawls, creeps with hissings, leaving behind the moiré trail of her drool... On both sides of the boneless body hang, like pitiful wrecks, tentacles in funereal gloves. For she will, indeed, lead the burial of our Latin race. Complete negation of our genius... Poor little Chanson, faithful mirror in which men reflect themselves, are you responsible for their hideousness?"

In a 1912 essay in Le Monde artiste Lefevre criticized the excessive cosmopolitanism of Paris, calling for more emphasis on French culture. He said, "We need to do some soul searching, and ask ourselves whether our guests are becoming our masters." Maurice Lefèvre died in 1917.

== Selected works ==
- Lefevre, Maurice; Vuagneux, Henri (2011-09-29) [1891]. Scaramouche; Pantomime-Ballet En 2 Actes Et 4 Tableaux de Maurice Lefevre & Henri Vuagneux. Musique de MM. Andr Messager & Georges Street. Nabu Press. ISBN 978-1-246-96775-3.
- Maurice Lefèvre (1893). À travers chants. Preface by Jules Claretie (1840-1913). Paris: P. Ollendorff.
- Maurice Lefèvre (1896). Les demi-cabots, le café-concert, le cirque, les forains. Illustrated by Henri-Gabriel Ibels (1867-1936). Paris: G. Charpentier et E. Fasquelle.
- Georges d' Esparbès; André Ibels; Maurice Lefèvre; Georges Montorgueil (1896). Les Demi-cabots. G. Charpentier et E. Fasquelle.
- Maurice Lefèvre (1909). La princesse sans coeur: conte.
