= Charles Bodinier =

French theater manager

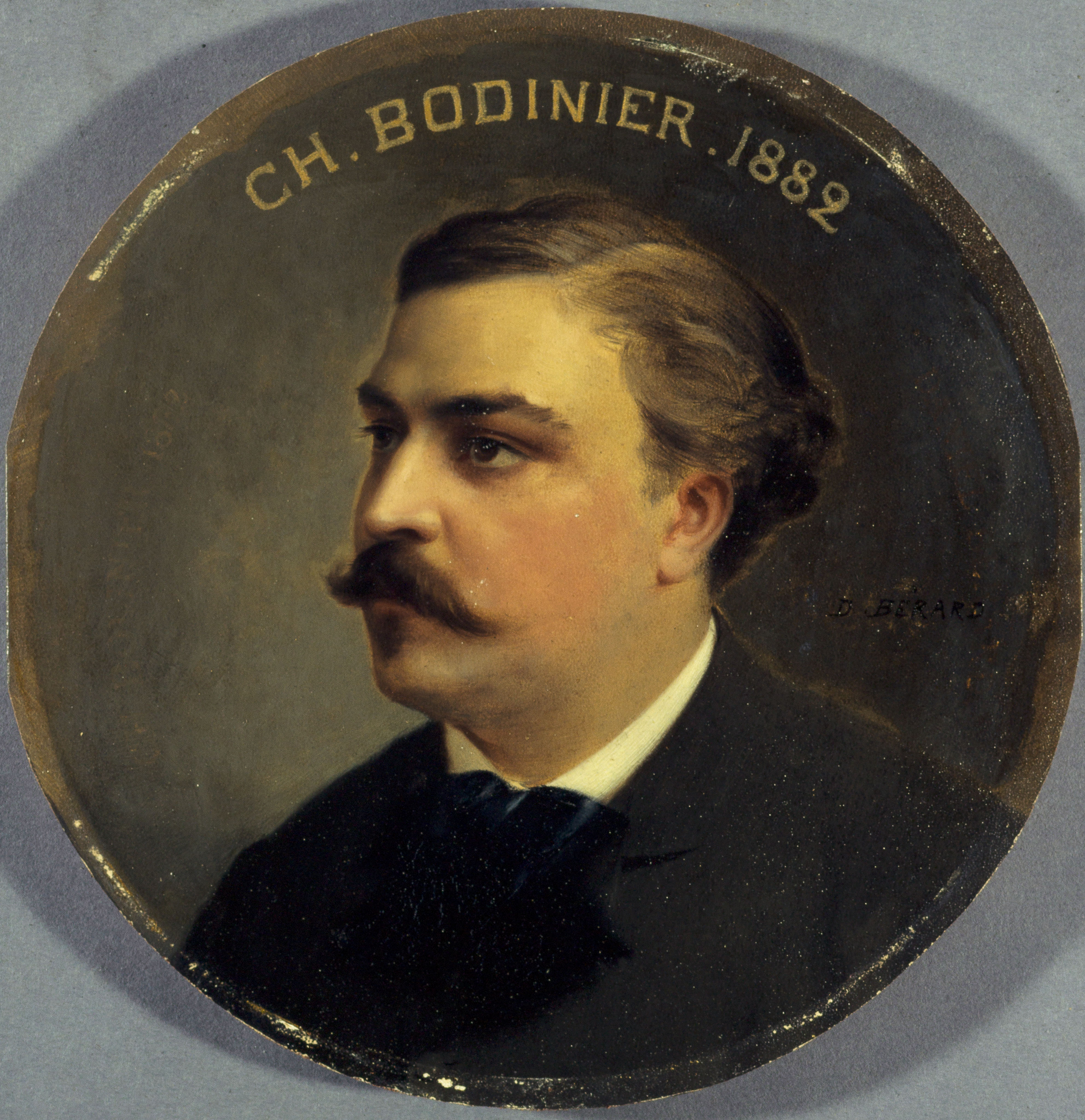
- Charles Bodinier by Daniel Bérard in 1883, musée Carnavalet
- Born: January 6, 1844; Beaufort-en-Vallée, Maine-et-Loire, France
- Died: 1911 (aged 66–67)
- Occupation: Theater director
- Known for: "La Bodinière" theater

Charles Bodinier (6 January 1844 - 1911) was a French theater manager. After working for the Comédie-Française he became director of the Théâtre d'Application and then of the Théâtre La Bodinière. La Bodinière appealed to an elite audience, and staged a variety of lectures and performances until Bodinier retired in 1902.

== Early years ==
Charles Bodinier was born on 6 January 1844 in Beaufort-en-Vallée, Maine-et-Loire. He became a professional soldier, and was captured in the war of 1870. He was not released until 1874. In 1876 he joined the staff of the Comédie-Française. Bodinier was Secretary-General of the Comédie-Française from 1882 to 1889.

== Théatre d'Application ==
In 1886 Bodinier proposed to establish a small theater where the students of the Conservatoire could stage performances of the Classics, a concept that was well received by the Minister of Fine Arts. In his application to the Commission des Auteurs et Compositeurs Dramatiques Bodinier insisted that the Théâtre d'Application would be a school and not a profit-making enterprise, and on that basis he was given permission for six months. Both the municipal council and the ministry subscribed to establishing the theater.

In 1887 Bodinier opened the Théâtre d'Application in an old tannery at 18 rue Saint-Lazare for use by students at the Conservatoire de Paris. He became director of the theater in 1888. The foyer of the premises were used as an art gallery. The artists Jules Chéret, Ferdinand Bac and Théophile Steinlen had their first one-person shows there while the main room was being used for the Théâtre d'Application.

== La Bodinière ==
The original purpose evolved. The theater at 18 rue Saint-Lazare became known as "La Bodinière" and began to be used for different purposes. La Bodinière's audience came to include members of the Parisian upper class and intelligentsia. Starting in 1890, Bodinier began to put on matinées-causeries, where well-known literary figures gave talks. He also staged plays and shadow shows. A popular format was a combined lecture with a recital that illustrated the topic.

Charles Bodinier abandoned the theater in 1902 and left philosophically to spend in a quiet retirement in the suburbs. He died in 1911 aged 67.
