= Ernest Alexandre Honoré Coquelin =

French actor (1848–1909)

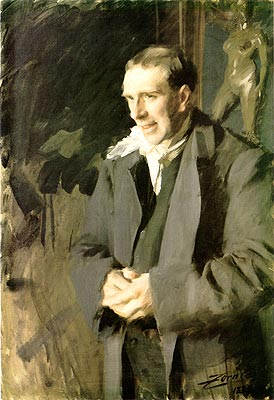
Portrait by Anders Zorn (1889)

Ernest Alexandre Honoré Coquelin (16 May 1848 – 8 February 1909), also called Coquelin cadet, using the French word cadet, which is used to identify the younger of two brothers, to distinguish him from his brother Benoît-Constant Coquelin, was a French actor.

He was born at Boulogne. He entered the Conservatoire in 1864. He graduated with the first prize in comedy and made his debut in 1867 at the Odéon. The next year he appeared with his brother at the Théâtre Français and became a sociétaire in 1879. He played a great many parts, in both the classic and the modern repertoire, and also had much success in reciting monologues of his own composition. He wrote Le Livre des convalescents (1880), Le Monologue moderne (1881), Fairiboles (1882), Le Rire (1887), Pirouettes (1888).

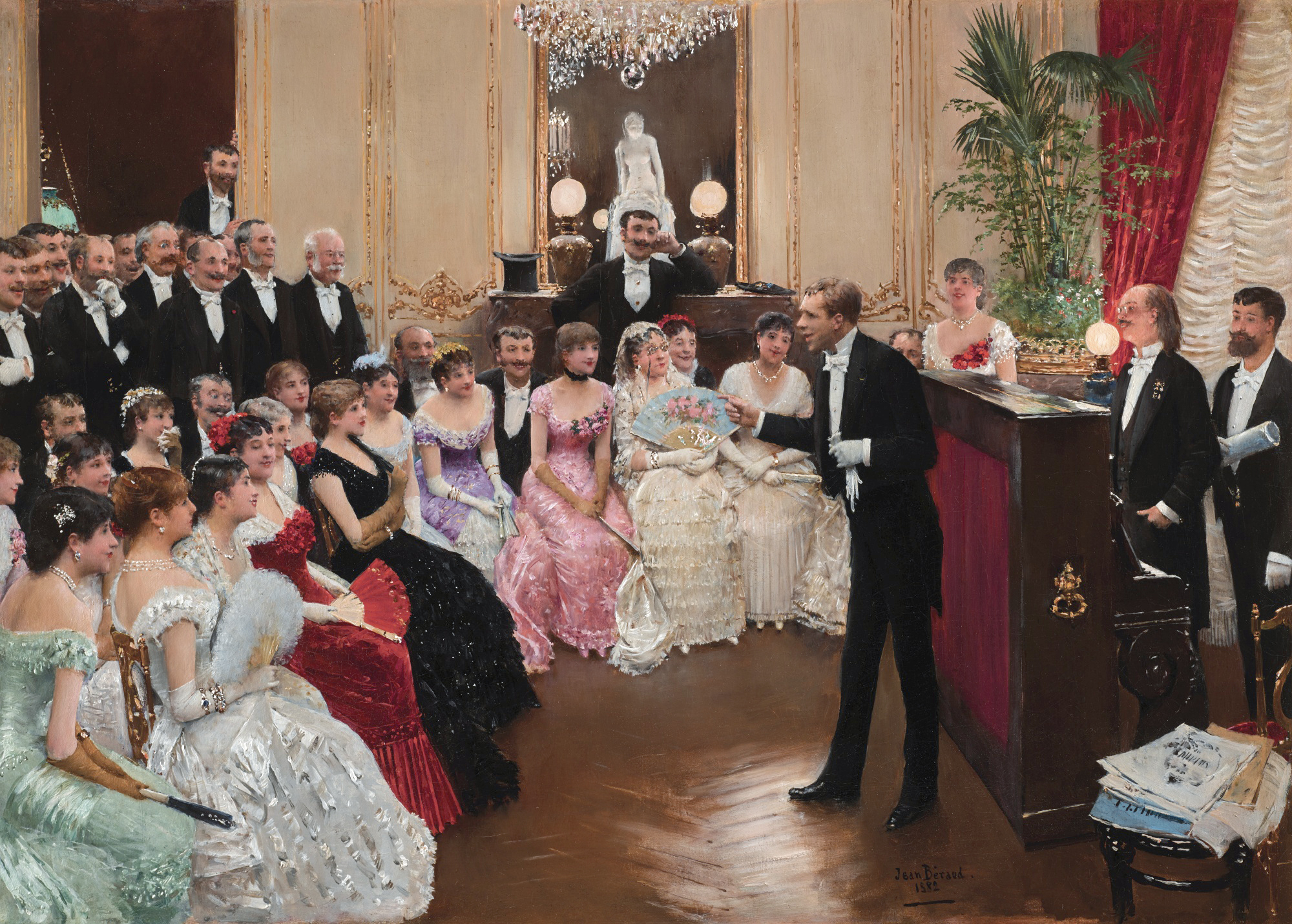
Le Monologue (1882) by Jean Béraud

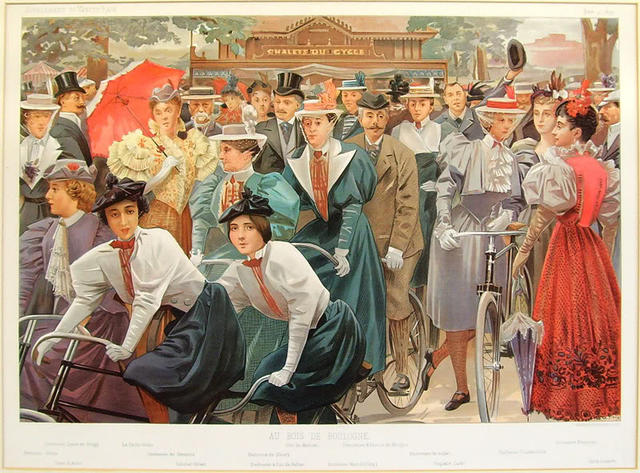
Coquelin appears in a fashionable crowd in the Bois de Boulogne drawn by Guth, 1897

He died within days of his famous older brother Constant.
