= Yvette Guilbert =

French cabaret singer

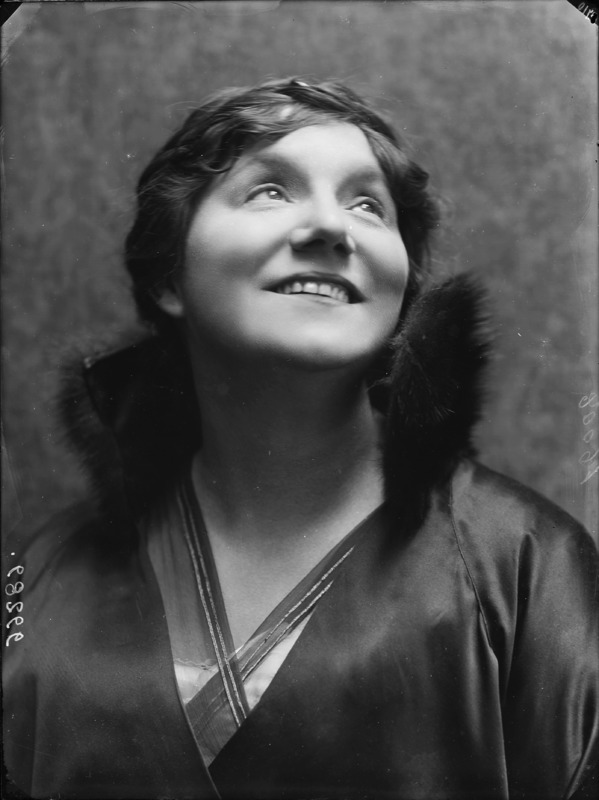
- Born: Emma Laure Esther Guilbert; 20 January 1865; Paris, France
- Died: 3 February 1944 (aged 79); Aix-en-Provence, France
- Resting place: Père Lachaise Cemetery
- Occupations: Cabaret singer, actress on stage and in silent films
- Known for: Belle Époque diseuse, innovator of the French chanson, subject of portraits by Henri de Toulouse-Lautrec
- Spouse: Max Schiller (m. 1897)
- Awards: Awarded the Legion of Honor as the Ambassadress of French Song, 9 July 1932

Signature
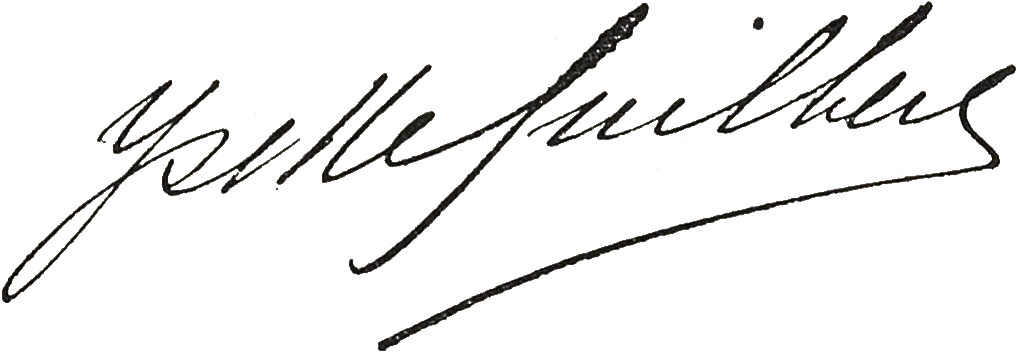

Yvette Guilbert (French pronunciation: [ivɛt gilbɛʁ]; born Emma Laure Esther Guilbert; 20 January 1865 – 3 February 1944) was a French cabaret singer and actress of the Belle Époque.

== Biography ==
Emma Laure Esther Guilbert was born in Paris on 20 January 1865 to a modestly wealthy family. Her mother, Adeline, had a millinery business and her father was a shopkeeper. However, her father left when her mother's business failed, leaving her in very difficult financial circumstances. She began singing as a child, but at age 16 worked as a model at the Printemps department store in Paris. She was discovered by a journalist. She took acting and diction lessons, which enabled her in 1886 to appear on stage at several smaller venues. Guilbert debuted at the Varieté Theatre in 1888. She eventually sang at the popular Eldorado club, then at the Jardin de Paris before headlining in Montmartre at the Moulin Rouge in 1890. The English painter William Rothenstein described this performance in his first volume of memoirs:

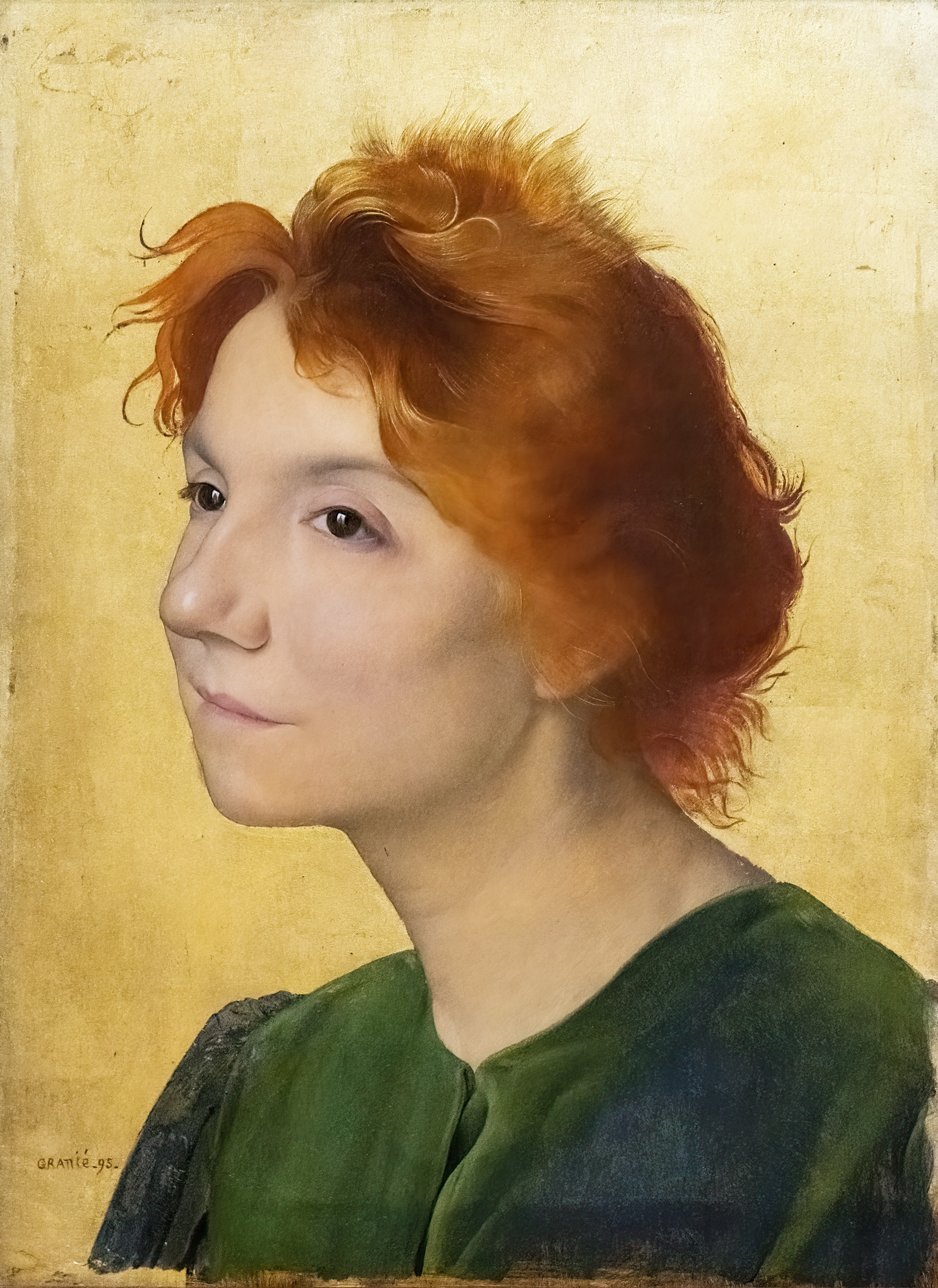
Yvette Guilbert, by Joseph Granié (1895)

One evening Lautrec came up to the rue Ravignan to tell us about a new singer, a friend of Xanrof, who was to appear at the Moulin Rouge for the first time... We went; a young girl appeared, of virginal aspect, slender, pale, without rouge. Her songs were not virginal – on the contrary; but the frequenters of the Moulin were not easily frightened; they stared bewildered at this novel association of innocence with Xanrof's horrific double entendre; stared, stayed and broke into delighted applause.

For her act, she was usually dressed in bright yellow with long gloves and stood almost perfectly still, gesturing with her long arms as she sang. An innovator, she favored monologue-like "patter songs" (as they came to be called) and often was billed as a "diseuse" or "sayer". The lyrics (some of them her own) were raunchy; their subjects were tragedy, lost love, and the Parisian poverty from which she had come. During the 1890s she appeared regularly alongside Kam-Hill, another star of the time, often singing songs by Tarride.

In 1892, she made her debut in the Café des Ambassadeurs at the Champs-Élysées. She changed the atmosphere at the cafe-concert overnight. Before her, the audience was noisy; the artists often heckled and bullied. With Guilbert, singers were finally able to perform in peace. For eight years, every summer, she returned to Les Ambassadeurs. In 1893, she urged the director Pierre Ducarre to put a roof over the garden, not only to improve acoustics, but also so that the venue could remain open even on rainy days.

Taking her cue from the new cabaret performances, Guilbert broke and rewrote all the rules of music-hall with her audacious lyrics, and the audiences loved her. She was noted in France, England, and the United States at the beginning of the 20th century for her songs and imitations of the common people of France. Author Patrick Bade believed that Guilbert "derived her trademark black gloves from Pornocrates" a famous painting by symbolist artist Félicien Rops.

She was a favorite subject of artist Henri de Toulouse-Lautrec, who made many portraits and caricatures of Guilbert and dedicated his second album of sketches to her. Sigmund Freud attended her performances, including one in Vienna, and called her a favorite singer. George Bernard Shaw wrote a review highlighting her novelty. The reviews were not all positive. The playwright and songwriter Maurice Lefèvre said of her

Let's enter the Chanson Moderne. There she is! Long leech, sexless! She crawls, creeps with hissings, leaving behind the moiré trail of her drool...On both sides of the boneless body hang, like pitiful wrecks, tentacles in funereal gloves. For she will, indeed, lead the burial of our Latin race. Complete negation of our genius...Poor little Chanson, faithful mirror in which men reflect themselves, are you responsible for their hideousness?"

In 1897, she married Max Schiller, an impresario. Guilbert made successful tours of England and Germany, and the United States in 1895–1896. She performed at Carnegie Hall in New York City. Even in her fifties, her name still had drawing power and she appeared in several silent films (including a star turn in F. W. Murnau's Faust). She also appeared in sound fims, including a role with friend Sacha Guitry. Her recordings for La Voix de son maître include the famous "Le Fiacre" as well as some of her own compositions such as "Madame Arthur". She accompanied herself on piano for some numbers.

She once gave a performance for the Prince of Wales, later King Edward VII, at a private party on the French Riviera. Hostesses vied to have her at their parties.

In later years, Guilbert turned to writing about the Belle Époque, and in 1902, two of her novels (La Vedette and Les Demi-vieilles) were published. In the 1920s, there appeared her instructional book L'art de chanter une chanson (The art of singing a Song). She also conducted schools for young girls in New York and Paris. One of her pupils in Paris was the American soprano and folk song fieldworker Loraine Wyman. Another was Pamela Gibson, who became a senior archivist at Bletchley Park during the Second World War.

Guilbert became a respected authority on her country's medieval folklore and on 9 July 1932 was awarded the Legion of Honor as the Ambassadress of French Song.

Yvette Guilbert died in on 4 February 1944, aged 79, in Aix-en-Provence. She was interred in the Père Lachaise Cemetery in Paris.

Twenty years later her biography That Was Yvette: The Biography of a Great Diseuse by Bettina Knapp and Myra Chipman (New York: Holt, Rinehart & Winston, 1964) was released.

== Filmography ==
- Let's Make a Dream (1936) as Une invitée
- Iceland Fisherman (1934) as La Grand-Mère Moan
- The Two Orphans (1933) as La Frochard
- La Dame D'en Face (1932)
- Laissez faire le temps (1932)
- En zinc sec (1931)
- Bluff (1929)
- Le manque de mémoire (1929)
- L'Argent (1928) La Méchain
- Die lachende Grille (1926) as Die alte Fadette
- Faust (1926) as Marthe Schwerdtlein: Gretchens Tante / Marguerite's Aunt
- Los dos pilletes (1924) as Zéphyrine
- An Honorable Cad (1919)

== Gallery ==
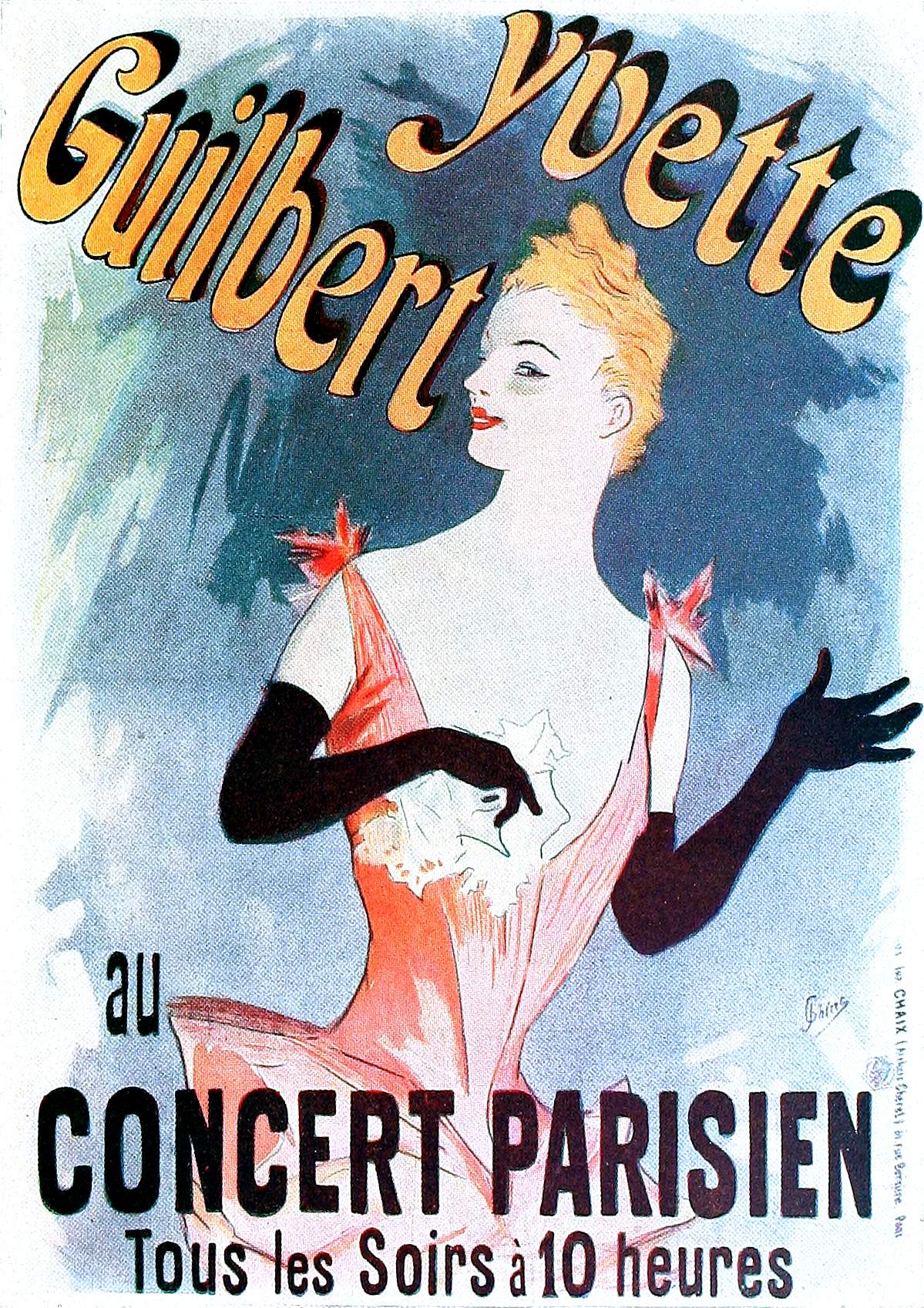
Jules Chéret, Yvette Guilbert, 1891 Art Nouveau poster for the famous Parisian chanteuse

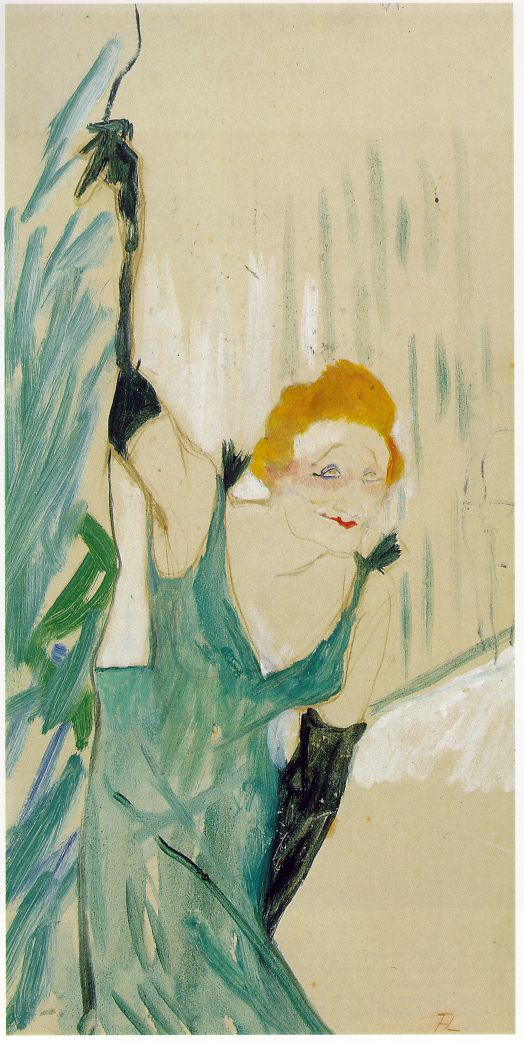
Toulouse-Lautrec, Yvette Guilbert

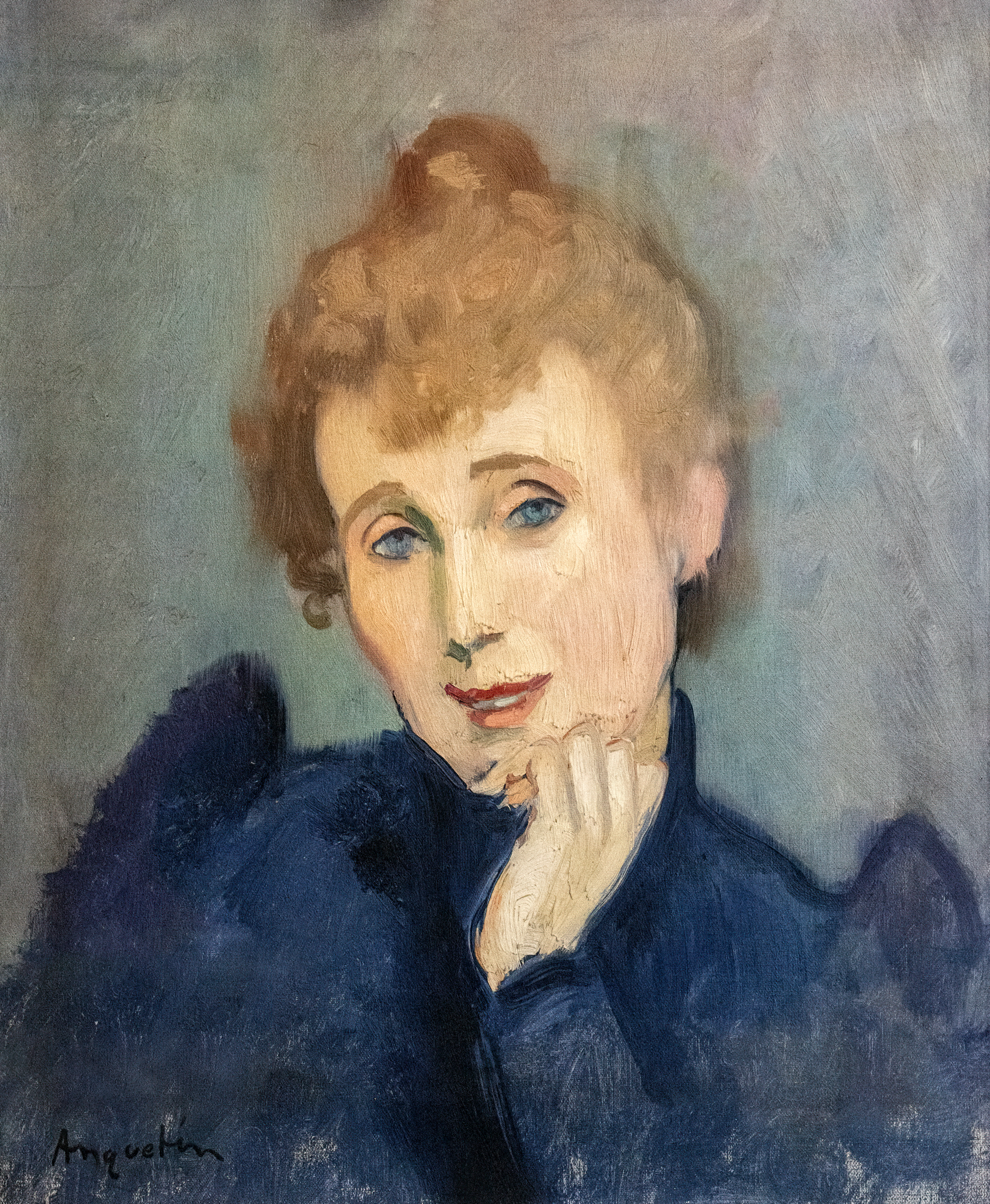
Yvette Guilbert 1893
by Louis Anquetin

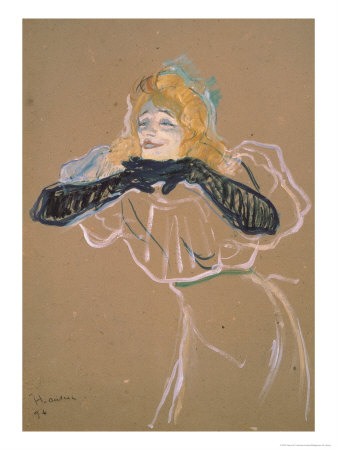
1894: Singing "Linger Longer, Loo"

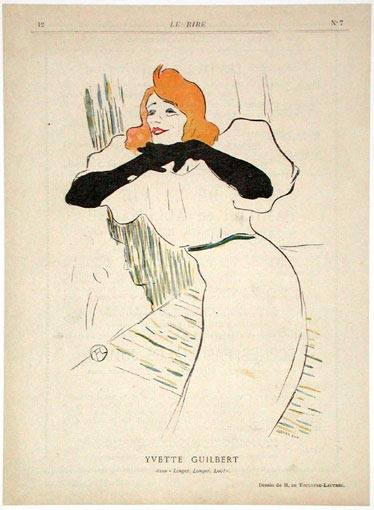
Yvette Guilbert, 1894
by Toulouse-Lautrec

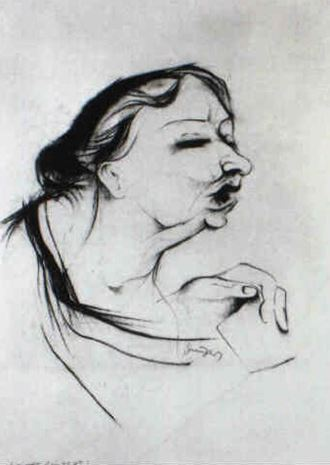
Guilbert in her later years,
by Max Dungert

== See also ==
- Marguerite Deval

== Sources ==
- Louis de Robert The eternal enigma, New York City, 1897
- Helena, Montana Daily Independent, Chit Chat of Affairs Mundane in Land of Gaul, Wednesday Morning, 10 November 1928, page 11
- New York Times, "Yvette Guilbert, Singer, Dies at 79", 4 February 1944, page 16
- Knapp, Bettina; Chipman, Myra (1964). That was Yvette; the biography of Yvette Guilbert, the great diseuse. New York: Holt, Rinehart and Winston.
