= Continental-Kunstfilm =

German film production company

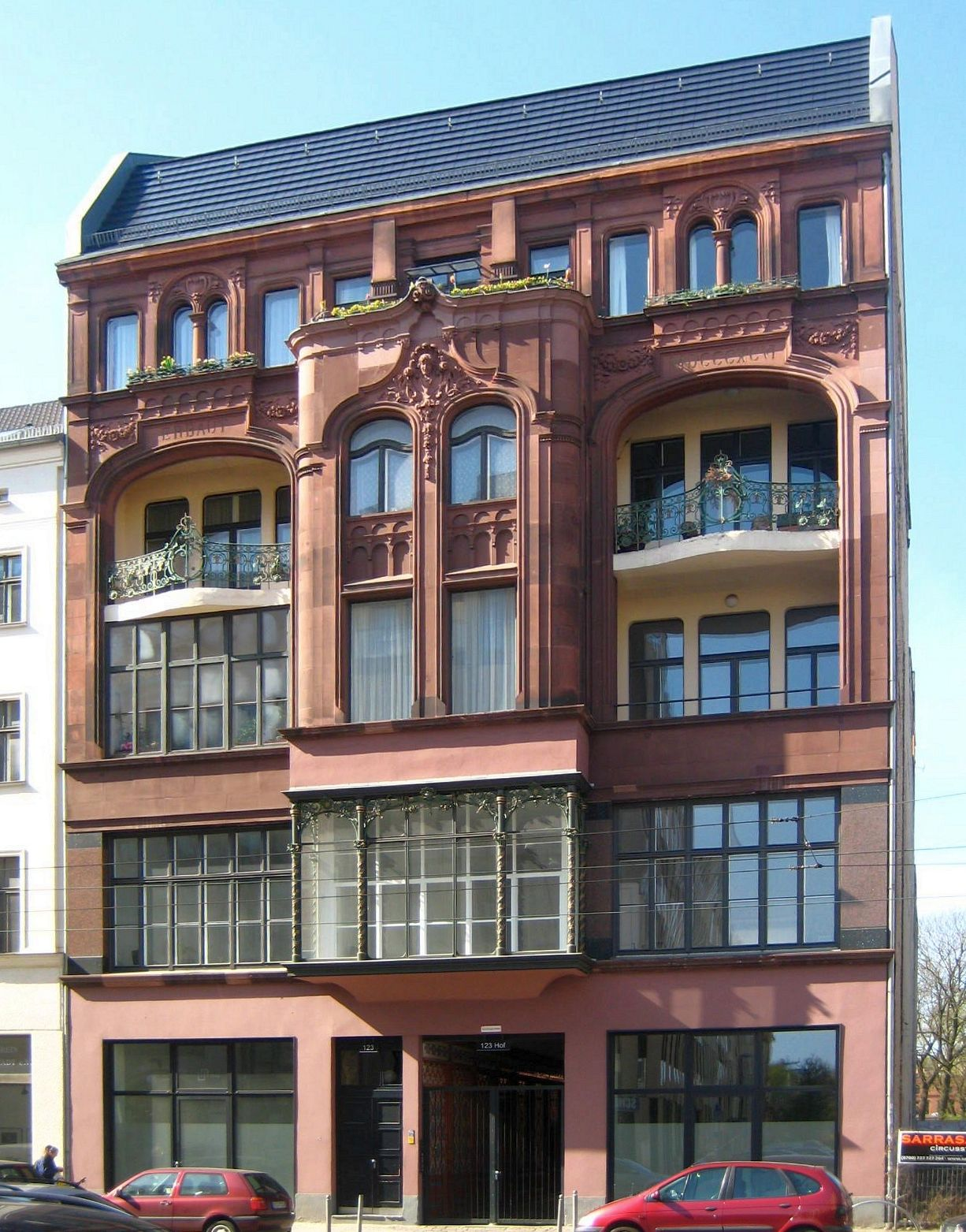
123 Chauseestraße, Berlin, Continental-Kunstfilm's first studio (Note: The inscription ERBAUT MDCCCXCVI (built 1906) appears on the building. Remarkably it survived World War II, and ended up on the East Berlin side of the Berlin Wall not far from the Chausseestraße Berlin border crossing after 1961. Chauseestraße features towards the end of the 2015 film Bridge of Spies, although 123 doesn't appear to be included in the shots. In number 121 next door (destroyed during the war), Karl Liebknecht founded Spartakusbund on 1 January 1916. See 'Spartacus Memorial' in Luisenstädtischer Bildungsverein (2002), retrieved 1 April 2015.)

Continental-Kunstfilm GmbH (Continental Art Film) was a short-lived German film production company based in Berlin, formed in February 1912 by Walter Schmidthässler and Max Rittberger. A large number of Continental-Kunstfilm's productions are now probably lost, although some significant films have survived into the 21st century.

Continental, with offices and studios at 123 Chauseestraße, began by releasing a mix of documentaries and comedies, together with serious melodramas by directors such as Max Mack. The company produced the first feature film about the sinking of the RMS Titanic, (In Nacht und Eis) in August 1912, directed by Mime Misu. Joe May and Ernst Reicher early in their careers made the first 'Stuart Webbs' detective films there; Otto Rippert and Harry Piel also directed films at Continental; and Gerhard Dammann wrote and directed numerous comedy shorts starring his 'Bumke' character in 1913.

In early 1914 the company constructed a small glasshouse studio in the Berlin suburb of Weißensee where Reicher continued to film many of his 'Stuart Webbs' detective dramas before removing to Munich in 1918. Continental's own output dropped significantly after 1915.

After the end of World War I, Continental leased the Weißensee studio to Eric Pommer's Decla company. Fritz Lang used the studios for some sequences of his early productions, and Robert Wiene shot the classic expressionist horror Das Cabinet des Dr. Caligari there in 1919.

The building at 123 Chauseestraße still exists, having survived World War II; the studios in Weißensee were demolished in 1928 to make way for residential apartments which are still standing as of 2021.

== History ==
=== 123 Chausseestraße ===
Walter Schmidthässler (also Schmidt-Häßler) was an actor who had worked with the Meiningen Ensemble at the Meiningen Court Theatre before turning author and film scriptwriter. He joined Jules Greenbaum's Deutsche Vitascope production company in 1910 as director and lead actor.

He formed Schmidthassler-Film GmbH in 1911, which became Continental-Kunstfilm the following year. Schmidthässler and Max Rittberger, an engineer and businessman, signed their partnership agreement on 5 February 1912, with a share capital of 150,000 marks. On 12 February 1912 Continental-Kunstfilm moved into the old Deutsche Bioscope studio at 123 Chausseestraße, which Greenbaum vacated when he moved all his Vitascope production facilities to 32-34 Lindenstraße in October 1912. The building (fronted in red sandstone) in Chauseestraße was built in the colorful and decorative Jugendstil style. Continental's main offices were located at 235 Friedrichstraße, Berlin. A brief notice of the new company appeared in the trade journal de:Lichtbild-Bühne in March.

However, Schmidthässler left Continental after only a few months in April 1912, announcing im late March that Schmidthässler-Film company was being taken over by Continental. He returned to Deutsche Vitascope (the previous tenant of the building), going on to direct over 100 films.

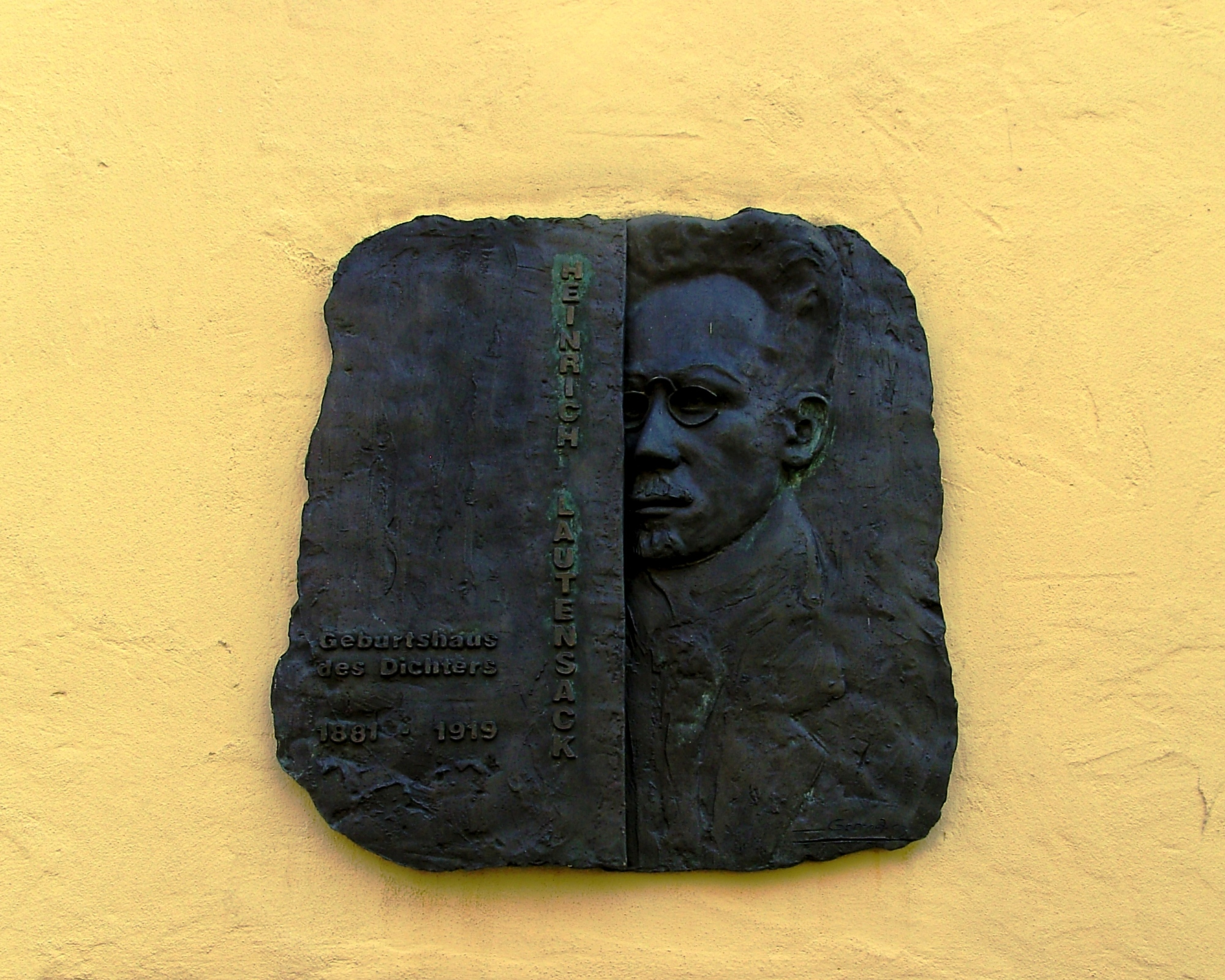
Memorial tablet to Heinrich Lautensack at his birthplace in Vilshofen an der Donau

Heinrich Lautensack (who had also previously worked for Deutsche Vitascope) was engaged as script writer and head of advertising. He wrote the screenplays for at least five Continental films, mostly psychological melodramas: Zwischen Himmel und Erde; Die Macht der Jugend; Zweimal gelebt (extant); Der Mann in der Flasche; Das ist der Krieg; and Entsagungen.

Several of Continental's early releases were directed by Max Mack, another ex-Vitascope director who had previously made his mark with one of the first autorenfilms, Der Andere with Albert Bassermann: at Continental, Mack directed Lebensbilder; Die lieben Freunde; Die gelbe Rasse (The Yellow Peril); Blinde Liebe; Die Hochzeitsfackel, and Zweimal gelebt.

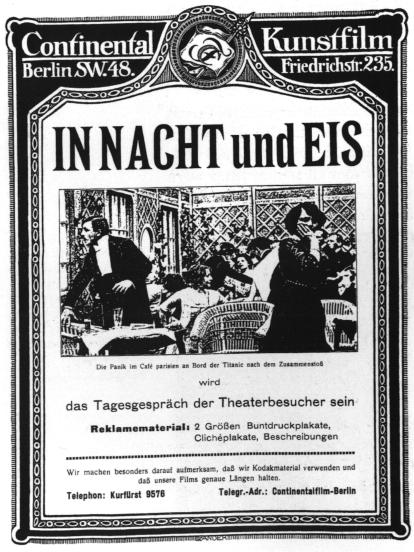
Poster for In Nacht und Eis, directed by Mime Misu

The Romanian-born mime artist and ballet-dancer Mime Misu (Mișu Rosescu) made three films for Continental in 1912:

- Das Gespenst von Clyde (The Ghost of Clyde)
- In Nacht und Eis, the first full-length film about the sinking of the RMS Titanic which sank on 15 April that year. The film was made between May and June 1912. Max Rittberger, (the firm's co-founder) was an engineer by trade, and made the 8 metre-long floating model for the Titanic film (according to the cameraman Emil Schünemann, who also worked on Misu's next film.
- Mirakel, a film of a religious mystery play set in medieval times, which was completed by October 1912. The play, The Miracle by Karl Vollmoeller, had been staged with huge public success in London by Max Reinhardt in early in 1912. Continental did not own the legitimate film rights to the production, which were acquired by an American self-made businessman living in London, Joseph Menchen. His full-colour The Miracle (1912 film) was released in December 1912, and Menchen and the film's US distributor Al Woods successfully sought court injunctions to stop Continental's distributors from showing Mirakel as The Miracle, as if it were the 'genuine' film of the Reinhardt Olympia production. As a result, Continental's Mirakel confusingly acquired at least six titles. See also The Miracle (1912 film)#Litigation.

Otto Rippert, who had acted in In Nacht und Eis, turned to directing in 1912 and made around ten films with Continental between November that year and August 1913. Rippert later directed Homunculus, an early science fiction film. Before Harry Piel turned to acting he directed a handful of films for Continental in 1912–1913.

The popular 'Bumke' short comedies written, starring and directed by Gerhard Dammann as the eponymous hero appeared throughout 1913, sometimes at the rate of one a week. At the end of 1913 Dammann left Continental, continuing his film career (possibly for contractual reasons) with the 'Luny' character: and Max Rittberger (the co-founder) left the business in early 1914. In April 1914 he was replaced by Christoph Mülleneisen Junior, as a new director of Continental for a year. His father, Christoph Mülleneisen had signed Asta Nielsen in May 1911 for Deutsche Bioscop (Greenbaum had departed for good in September 1909) and PAGU. Anton Mülleneisen was the cameraman for Der geheimnisvolle Nachtschatten (1914).

=== May and Reicher ===
Joe May made ten films at Continental, the first (In der Tiefe des Schachtes) being released in November 1912. Paul Leni also worked on designing various films with May at Continental, including Ein Ausgestoßener and Das Panzergewölbe.

Ernst Reicher starred in May's second film, Vorglühen des Balkanbrandes (The Balkan Traitors), in early 1914. In the same year Reicher directed two films at Continental, Die Statue and Das Werk. Together they directed and starred in the first three of the 'Stuart Webbs' films, a popular series in which Reicher played a gentleman detective modelled on Sherlock Holmes: Die geheimnisvolle Villa; Der Mann im Keller; and Der Spuk im Haus des Professors.

In an acrimonious and well-publicised split, May and Reicher fell out with their production managers over the 'Stuart Webbs' films, and left Continental together. Having formed their own production company, Stuart Webbs-Film GmbH, they made the next in the detective series, Das Panzergewölbe (The Armoured Vault) in June 1914, using Continental-Kunstfilm's studios for the filming.

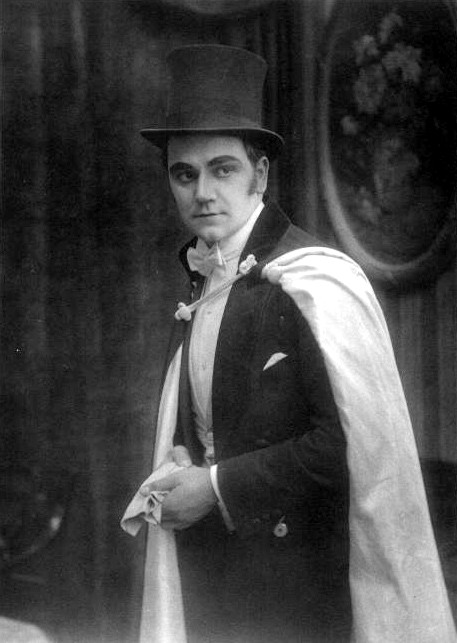
Harry Piel in an acting role

=== 9 Franz Josef-Straße ===
In the summer of 1914 Continental-Kunstfilm built a new studio at 9 Franz Josef-Straße (now Max Liebermannstraße) in Weißensee, a north-eastern suburb of Berlin. It was next door to the double glasshouse studio at no. 5–7, built in 1913 by Vitascope and separated by the narrow site of no. 8.

When the First World War broke out in August 1914, May had to return to his native Vienna to do his military service, and on his return to Berlin he and Reicher split up. Reicher leased the studio from Continental and continued to make the 'Stuart Webbs' films with his Reicher & Reicher company until 1918.

May formed his own company, May-Film GmbH, continuing to make serious films with his wife Mia May, as well as producing the 'Joe Deebs' detective series, in which Harry Piel directed Max Landa and later Harry Liedtke in the title role. The first three Joe Deebs films were premièred at the Union-Theater Lichtspiele, later the Ufa-Pavillon am Nollendorfplatz.

May produced one more film at Continental-Kunstfilm, Der geheimnisvolle Nachtschatten, again directed by Harry Piel. May later rented Jules Greenbaum's Vitascope studios at 5-7 Franz-Josef-Straße, almost next door to Continental.

Albert Paulig made three Albert films in 1915, but Continental-Kunstfilm produced far fewer films after this date. When in 1917 the German government quietly consolidated the larger German film production companies into a single conglomerate, Ufa, Continental-Kunstfilm was not included.

=== The Cabinet of Dr. Caligari ===
The studio at No. 9 Franz-Josef-Straße, Weissensee (dating from 1914) was bought after the war in 1919 by Film-Atelier GmbH (FAG). The owner was Frau Cill-Gottscho of Philadelphia, USA, and the directors were Dr. Lucian Gottscho and Chaskel Eisenberg. (Note: Lucian Gottscho is perhaps best known for his bayonet designs, the S14G1 and S14G2 and the S15G, manufactured during World War I and fitted to German rifles like the Gewehr 98 (source: Jackson 2012). His B. Phil. dissertation from the University of Freiburg was entitled Miscellen aus der Theorie der Curven und Flächen zweiter Ordnung unter Anwendung der Methode des Unendlich-Grossen (Miscellanea from second-order curves and surfaces, using the method of infinitesimals), Frankfurt a.M.: R. Baumbach, 1896. His books include Patentpraxis (Patent practice) (1903), and Wortzeichen-Register der Musikinstrumenten-Branche (1907) on musical instrument maker's marks and trademarks. He patented a design for a thermo-electric pile in 1900.: US patent 650062, Gottscho, Lucian, "Thermo-electric pile", issued 1900-05-22; Chaksel Eisenberg (his first name is the Yiddish version of Ezekiel) patented two shoe-making machines: US patent, Eisenberg, Chaskel, "Machine for flanging uppers of boots or shoes", issued 1895-10-22; US patent 725233, Eisenberg, Chaskel, "Lasting Machine", issued 1903-04-14) The property seems have been leased by Lixie-Film around the same time, (Note: FAG is listed in Berlin phonebooks as the owner of the property; Lixie shared the same address. Furthermore, the Lixie-Atelier is apparently only mentioned in Berlin cinema address books.) and leased to Decla Film from around October 1919. Decla used the studio during the production of at least three titles: Otto Rippert's historical spectacular 7-reeler Die Pest in Florenz, with a script by Fritz Lang (some interior scenes only); likewise some interiors in Part 2 of Lang's own Die Spinnen; and the whole of Robert Wiene's oppressive horror Das Cabinet des Dr. Caligari, from December 1919 to January 1920. The relatively small size of the studio (approximately 6m x 6m) limited the size of the sets, and some elements had to be cut from the planned script because of the restricted space. (Note: Robinson 1997, pp. 25, 28. Robinson seems to be briefly in error about the builder of the studio at 9 Franz Josef-Straße: it was almost certainly not Vitascope, who built the studio next door at No. 5-7, and which was later leased to Joe May.)

Decla merged in April 1920 with Bioscop-Film (which had been sold by Jules Greenbaum to Carl Schleussner in 1908–09) to form Decla-Bioscop, before being taken over by Ufa in 1921.

FAG enlarged the studio in c.1920 by building on the vacant site of nos. 10–12, to create 9-12 Franz-Josef Strasse. Lixie-Film-Atelier-Weißensee GmbH bought the studios in 1921, and later joined with a number of other production companies not included in the UFA conglomerate to take over the disused studios of Deutsche Mutoskop- und Biograph GmbH in the Lankwitz district in 1924/25, founding the Muto-Großatelier für Filmherstellung (Muto-Atelier).

In 1928 the Weißensee housing association acquired the land for new residential buildings which were still standing as of 2012.

== Selected films made by Continental-Kunstfilm ==
- In Nacht und Eis (1912)
- Mirakel (1912)
