= Margarita la tornera =

Opera by Ruperto Chapí

- Opera by Ruperto Chapí
- Cover of the 1999 live recording with Plácido Domingo
- Translation: Margarita the Gatekeeper
- Librettist: Carlos Fernández Shaw
- Language: Spanish
- Based on: dramatic poem by José Zorrilla
- Premiere: 24 February 1909; Teatro Real, Madrid

Margarita la tornera (Margarita the Gatekeeper) is an opera in three acts composed by Ruperto Chapí to a libretto by Carlos Fernández Shaw, based on a dramatic poem by José Zorrilla. It premiered on 24 February 1909 at the Teatro Real in Madrid in a performance conducted by the composer. An acclaimed recording of the opera came out in 1999 with Plácido Domingo and Elisabete Matos.

== Background and performance history ==
Following its initial staging, the opera languished in obscurity for many years. Finally, through the efforts of tenor Plácido Domingo, who starred in the new production, it was revived in Spain in 1999. This production was subsequently videotaped and shown on Spanish television. A CD of this revival, recorded live, was nominated for the 2003 Latin Grammy Award for Best Classical Album.

== Synopsis ==
The plot is based on an old legend, retold with variations in such plays as Karl Vollmöller's Das Mirakel and Maurice Maeterlinck's Soeur Beatrice, and in the films Das Mirakel (1912), Milagro de amor (1946), and The Miracle (1959). Margarita is a nun, and the gatekeeper at her convent. Don Juan Alarcon, an unscrupulous adventurer, persuades her to run away with him and seduces her. Margarita eventually discovers that she is only one in a series of sexual conquests by Don Juan, and returns to the convent to find that her absence has not been noticed at all. The statue of the Virgin Mary in the convent chapel has come to life and has been taking her place. As Margarita prays for forgiveness, the statue returns to its pedestal. Meanwhile, Don Juan follows, and is miraculously struck down by heavenly lightning.

== Recordings ==
- Chapí: Margarita la tornera – Elisabete Matos (Margarita), Plácido Domingo (Don Juan), Stefano Palatchi (Gavilán), Àngel Òdena (Don Lope), Ángeles Blancas (Sirena), María Rey-Joly ("La tornera"). Madrid Symphony Orchestra and Chorus conducted by Luis Garcia Navarro. Label: RTVE Música CD 65169
