= List of films made by Continental-Kunstfilm =

This list of films made by Continental-Kunstfilm GmbH is incomplete. The majority of films in this list are considered lost.

The list is sorted by date, then by film title. The dates shown (where known) may include: Berlin police censor (Zensur), Registering (Prüfung), copyright (UK or US), and first performance (fp).

Incomplete list of films made by Continental-Kunstfilm GmbH
Title	Director	Writer	Date (Note: Many dates are incomplete, but may include date of first performance or date of Censorship board (City Police or Reichsfilmzensur))
Der Strohwitwer	Arthur Ullmann		1912
Ein Dornröschen	(comedy)		4 May 1912
Pferde-kur	("Drastisch-Komisch")		4 May 1912
Die Falle	Max Mack		11 May 1912
Schlau-Mayer	Waldemar Hecker		11 May 1912
Ein Liebesbrief			11 May 1912
Lebensbilder	Max Mack		15 May 1912
Blinde Liebe	Max Mack		18 May 1912
Die Macht der Jugend		Heinrich Lautensack (de)	25 May 1912 (fp)
Die lieben Freunde	Max Mack		1 June 1912
Die gelbe Rasse (de) ("The Yellow Peril)"	Max Mack	Willy Hameister	1 June 1912
Zweimal gelebt (A Second Life)	Max Mack	Heinrich Lautensack	19 June 1912 (banned, no fp?)
Alles für eine Mark (comedy)			22 June 1912
Der Mann in der Flasche ("Trickfilm")	Waldemar Hecker		22 June 1912
Die Hochzeitsfackel	Max Mack		29 June 1912
Das Gespenst von Clyde	Mime Misu	Max Rittberger (prod.?	19 June 1912 (regd.); 6 July 1912 (fp)
Scherben bringen Glück			13 July 1912 (fp)
Titanic; In Nacht und Eis (Shipwrecked in Icebergs)	Mime Misu	Mime Misu, Max Rittberger (prod.)	6 July 1912 (reg); 17 August 1912 (fp)
Großmütterchens Jugendstreich			20 July 1912 (fp)
Mirakel (Das Marienwunder, eine alte Legende) (DE) (Sister Beatrix) (UK) (The Miracle) (US) (The Miracle of Sister Beatrice) (US)	Mime Misu	Mime Misu after Karl Vollmoeller (unauthorised)	18 October 1912 (US press showing); 19 October 1912 (Banned, Berlin censor); 15 December 1912 (fp, US); 17 December 1912 (fp, UK); May 1914 (fp, Ger.) (Over 18, Berlin censor)
Die fremde Legion; Die Fremdenlegion	Otto Rippert		November 1912
Mona Lisa	Charles Decroix ?		November 1912 (regd.)
Ein Tag auf der Insel Madeira	(Documentary series)		16 November 1912
In der Tiefe des Schachtes (de)	Joe May	Joe May	16 November 1912 (Adults only) 770m
Gelbstern	Otto Rippert		December 1912 (regd.)
Peter auf dem Witwenball			December 1912
Der Elektro-Kassen-Magnet	(Documentary)		December 1912 (censor)
Vorgluten des Balkanbrandes (de) (The Balkan Traitors); Das ist der Krieg (in Austro-Hungary) (Note: A misreading of the US Library of Congress volumes of copyright films has led to A.J Danziger being credited with directing Das ist der Krieg: he was merely the director of the New York Film Co., Continental's US distributors.)	Joe May	Joe May	7 December 1912
Mittelmeerfahrt des Norddeutschen Lloyd, Bremen. (?)1. Bild: Sizilien. Messina und Palermo	(Documentary)		13 December 1912
Mittelmeerfahrt des Norddeutschen Lloyd, Bremen. 2. Bild: Tanger	(Documentary)		13 December 1912
Mittelmeerfahrt... (?)3. Bild: Algier, Tunis, Malta	(Documentary)		13 December 1912
Mittelmeerfahrt... (?)4. Bild: Korfu	(Documentary)		13 December 1912
Der Triumph des Todes (Triumph of Death}	Harry Piel	Harry Piel	27 December 1912 (fp)
Bumke als Mr. Meschugge	Gerhard Dammann	Gerhard Dammann	1913
Bumke hat den Drehwurm entdeckt	Gerhard Dammann	Gerhard Dammann	1913
Bumke, der Hundefeind	Gerhard Dammann	Gerhard Dammann	1913
Bumke macht einen Haupttreffer	Gerhard Dammann	Gerhard Dammann	1913
Bumke soll sich das Rauchen abgewöhnen	Gerhard Dammann	Gerhard Dammann	1913
Die reiche Partie	Gerhard Dammann	Gerhard Dammann	1913
Fabrik-Marianne	Waldemar Hecker		1913
Lotos, die Tempeltänzerin (Der Tempeltänzerin Todestanz)	Lorre A. Winkel		1913
Teddy als Ehestifter (Teddy the Matchmaker)			1913
Das Verhängnis	Joe May {??}	Hermann Schüller	1913
Eine Wanderung durch Alt- und Neu-Athen	(Documentary)		January 1913 (fp)
Mannequins	Otto Rippert	Walter Turszinsky	10 January 1913
Als Hexe verurteilt (Condemned for Witchcraft)			31 January 1913
Bumke als Bursche	Gerhard Dammann	Gerhard Dammann	February 1913 (regd.)
Bumkes Hochzeit oder die verhängnisvolle Hummermayonaise	Gerhard Dammann	Gerhard Dammann	February 1913 (regd.)
Zertrümmerte Ideale	Otto Rippert		2 February 1913 (regd.)
Das Werk	Ernst Reicher	Ernst Reicher	6 February 1913
Schatten der Nacht (Shadows of Night)	Harry Piel	Harry Piel	14 February 1913
Bumke als Räuber wider Willen	Gerhard Dammann	Gerhard Dammann	March 1913
Bumke als Othello	Gerhard Dammann	Gerhard Dammann	March 1913
Scheingold	Otto Rippert		March 1913
Bumkes erster und letzter Ritt	Gerhard Dammann	Gerhard Dammann	7 March 1913 (fp)
Ein Ausgestoßener, 1. Teil (de) – Der junge Graf	Joe May	Paul Leni (Art dir.)	14 March 1913
Der schwarze Pierrot	Harry Piel	Harry Piel	14 March 1913
Bumkes Glück bei Frauen	Gerhard Dammann	Gerhard Dammann	April 1913
Bumke ist kitzlig	Gerhard Dammann	Gerhard Dammann	April 1913
Wie die Blätter... (extant)	Otto Rippert		April 1913 (regd.)
Surry der Steher (The Cyclist's Last Leap)	Otto Rippert		May 1913 (regd.); September 1913 (USA)
Bumke als Brieftrager (Der Brieftrager)	Gerhard Dammann	Gerhard Dammann	May 1913
Entsagungen (de) (Doom of Darkness)	Joe May	Heinrich Lautensack	July 1913
Überraschender Besuch bei Pastors	Gerhard Dammann	Gerhard Dammann	June 1913 (fp)
Vendetta	Waldemar Hecker		June 1913
Zwischen Himmel und Erde (de) (Twixt Earth and Sky)	Otto Rippert	Heinrich Lautensack	July 1913
Bumke "erringt" sich eine Braut	Gerhard Dammann	Gerhard Dammann	July 1913
Das Kompagniegeschäft	Gerhard Dammann	Gerhard Dammann	July 1913
Die Landkur	Gerhard Dammann	Gerhard Dammann	August 1913
Knickohr	Gerhard Dammann	Gerhard Dammann	August 1913
Nach dem Tode	Otto Rippert		August 1913 (regd.)
Signes List	Gerhard Dammann	Gerhard Dammann	15 August 1913
Die perfekte Köchin (Bumke)	Gerhard Dammann	Gerhard Dammann	22 August 1913 (fp); July 1913 (regd.)
Back to the West			September 1913 (USA)
Daredevil Dolly			September 1913 (USA)
The Heart of a Hunchback			September 1913 (USA)
The Hole in the Net (The Miser's Ward)			September 1913 (USA)
The Twisted Ear			September 1913 (USA)
Der Zopf	Gerhard Dammann	Gerhard Dammann	24 October 1913
Denn die Elemente haßen	Gerhard Dammann	Gerhard Dammann	November 1913
Geschwister	Hermann Schüller	Adelaide Renée, adapted from her La Griffe	November 1913
Der Kampf mit dem Bandwurm	Gerhard Dammann	Gerhard Dammann	November 1913
Man muß sich zu helfen wissen			November 1913
Der Diamantensucher			December 1913
Die Gefahren des Vollbarts	Gerhard Dammann	Gerhard Dammann	December 1913
Die Statue	Ernst Reicher	Ernst Reicher	1914 (banned until February 1919)
Die unheilbringende Perle (The Mystery of the Fatal Pearl)	Joe May {??}	Joe May	9 January 1914
Sensation of the Age			27 January 1914 (US copyright)
Das verschleierte Bild von Groß-Kleindorf (de) =Die Mona Lisa von Groß-Kleindorf	Joe May	Alfred Schirokauer	20 February 1914 (fp) (Note: The Veiled Image of Groß-Kleindorf is a typical example of the genre of the prize puzzle film (Preisrätselfilm) that existed briefly before the First World War. Certain events were shown on the screen without specifying an end to the story. Viewers could then submit written suggestions to newspapers such as the Berliner Tageblatt on how the film should end. The winner received prize money of 8,500 marks (52,135 euros). The resolution film was to be released on February 20, 1914.(Source:Gerhard Lamprecht (1969). Deutsche Stummfilme 1913–1914, p. 55. Berlin.) Despite the considerable sum of money, the genre of the prize puzzle film was not able to establish itself in Germany.)
Die geheimnisvolle Villa (de)	Joe May	Ernst Reicher	13 March 1914
Der Mann im Keller (de)	Joe May	Ernst Reicher	20 March 1914
Der Spuk im Haus des Professors (de)	Joe May	Ernst Reicher	May 1914
Die Mustercollection	Otto Rippert (became ill); Arthur Ullmann	Emil Müller (camera)	9 June 1914 (censor)
Flug zur Westgrenze (His Record Flight)	Max Obal		3 July 1914 (US copyright)
Der geheimnisvolle Nachtschatten	Harry Piel	Harry Piel, Joe May (prod.)	December 1914 (fp) (Adults only, banned 1916–1918)
Ein Ausgestoßener: 2. Teil: Der ewige Friede (de)	Arzén von Cserépy	Joe May; Paul Leni (design)	March 1915
Der Talisman	Eddie Ferrar-Seefeld		April 1915
Albert duelliert sich	Albert Paulig	Albert Paulig	June 1915
Albert hat Leibschmerzen (Albert hat die Sprache verloren)	Albert Paulig	Albert Paulig	June 1915 (banned)
Alberts Patentstrohhut	Albert Paulig	Albert Paulig	June 1915 (adults only)
Brillante Praxis	Gerhard Dammann	Gerhard Dammann	July 1916 (banned)

Films which don't belong in the list (Note: Various websites about Continental-Kunstfilm include a number of silent documentaries from 1910, including "Badeleben in Kullen", "Durch Hinterindiens Dschungeln", "Dorfleben in Nord-Siam" & "Teakwälder Siams". These and similar titles may or may not be by Continental. The entry at BFI Film & TV Database (Dead link) listed them (with English titles) as being made by Cosmopolitan. The Cosmo list has/had? many more similar titles. Since Filmportal.de has an entry for Badeleben in Kullen (they are usually right), Cosmopolitan may have been the UK distributor: or maybe vice versa - but no German censor date...)
Title	Director	Writer	Date
de:Heimat und Fremde	Joe May	Joe May	11 July 1913 (The very first film made by PAGU...)
de:Das Panzergewölbe (The Armoured Vault)	Joe May	Joe May, Ernst Reicher	26 June 1914 (fp) Made by Stuart Webbs-Film at Continental Studios

== See also ==
List of film production companies
