= The Plague of Florence =

1919 film directed by Otto Rippert

- Directed by: Otto Rippert
- Written by: Fritz Lang
- Based on: The Masque of the Red Death, short story by Edgar Allan Poe
- Produced by: Erich Pommer
- Starring: Theodor Becker; Karl Bernhard; Julietta Brandt
- Cinematography: Willy Hameister; Emil Schünemann
- Music by: Bruno Gellert
- Production company: Decla Film
- Release date: 23 October 1919
- Running time: 102 minutes (2000 restored version)
- Country: Weimar Germany
- Languages: Silent; German intertitles

The Plague in Florence (German: Pest in Florenz) (Note: The German title, as evidenced by the publicity poster, and by watching the credits at the very start of the film, is simply Pest in Florenz, without the article Die. Even the article on German Wikipedia de:Die Pest in Florenz is currently (January 2021) mis-titled. See also External links.) is a 1919 German silent historical film directed by Otto Rippert for Eric Pommer's Deutsche Eclair (Decla) production company. The screenplay was written by Fritz Lang. It stars Marga von Kierska, Theodor Becker, Karl Bernhard and Julietta Brandt. The film is a tragic romance set in Florence in 1348, just before the first outbreaks in Italy of the Black Death, which then spread out across the entire continent.

Lang's screenplay was based on the Edgar Allan Poe story "The Masque of the Red Death", but he heightened the story's sexual tension by making the plague the result of the actions of a young seductress.

== Plot ==
The Plague of Florence (1919)

Julia, a rich courtesan (Marga von Kierska), arrives in Florence. A cardinal fears that her beauty could rival the church's power, and orders inquiries to be made about her Christian beliefs. Cesare, the city's ruler, and Lorenzo (his son) both fall madly in love with her. Lorenzo starts a relationship with Julia, who shares his ideals of valuing love and lust above all else. Seeing that he cannot have Julia for himself, Cesare kidnaps her. He is aided by the church who want to stop the supposedly immoral behaviors she is inciting in people. After finding out what happened, Lorenzo leads a mob of townsfolk who adore Julia and storms the palace where she is about to be tortured. Lorenzo kills Cesare and rescues her. Lust and excess overtake the city.

Medardus, a hermit and a Christian fanatic, comes to the city to preach about the deadly consequences that that kind of behaviour will bring to the city, but no one listens to him. A pregnant Julia, however, keeps thinking about his words after he leaves and decides to look for him. She finds the cave outside the city where Medardus lives. Medardus initially tries to convince her to change her ways, but smitten by her, he is the one who ends up abandoning his ideals. He tries to kiss Julia, who runs away. Disgusted with himself, Medardus chops down a cross made out of wood he had carved outside his cave and goes to Florence. He arrives in time to stop Lorenzo (whom Julia has gotten tired of) from forcing himself on Julia. In the ensuing fight, Medardus kills Lorenzo and starts a relationship with Julia.

Florence's fine buildings are turned into dens of sexual debauchery. Excess and manslaughter continue uninterrupted until the arrival of a ragged female figure personifying the Plague, who infects the whole city with her deadly disease and plays the fiddle while the population dies in droves.

== Cast ==
- Otto Mannstädt as Cesare, ruler of Florence
- Anders Wikmann as Lorenzo, Cesare's Son
- Karl Bernhard as Lorenzo's confidant
- Erich Bartels as A Fool
- Franz Knaak as The Cardinal
- Erner Hübsch as A monk
- Marga von Kierska as Julia, a courtesan
- Auguste Prasch-Grevenberg as Julia's first servant
- Hans Walter as Julia's confidant
- Theodor Becker as Medardus, a hermit
- Julietta Brandt as The Plague

== Production ==
The production company was Eric Pommer's Decla-Film Gesellschaft, founded in February 1915 from the assets of the German branch of the French Éclair company (hence the initials from Deutsche Éclair). Éclair, like all other foreign-owned firms, was banned in Germany from the start of WWI and their assets (such as equipment, leases on studios, offices, etc.) confiscated by the government and resold. Decla did not become Decla-Bioskop until 1920, after merging with Deutsche Bioskop. The latter company was originally formed by Jules Greenbaum in 1899, sold to Carl Moritz Schleussner in 1908, and moved to the Babelsberg studios in 1911.

The imposing, crowd-filled, exterior sets of mediaeval Florentine architecture including the Medici Palace were designed by the architect Franz Jaffe (1855–1937), previously royal buildings advisor to the King of Prussia. Some of the more intimate interior scenes were filmed at the Weissensee Studios on 9 Franz Josef-Straße, Weissensee, Berlin, a glasshouse studio originally built in 1914 for the Continental-Kunstfilm production company.

The cameramen Willy Hameister and Emil Schünemann had previously filmed Continental's In Nacht und Eis, the first feature film about the sinking of the RMS Titanic: one of the stars in that film was Otto Rippert, who then went on to direct some further ten films for Continental in 1912 and 1913, most of which are considered lost. See also List of films made by Continental-Kunstfilm. Cameraman Hameister had also previously worked on the hugely successful film The Cabinet of Dr. Caligari, released earlier that year. Rippert had earlier that year directed Dance of Death with Fritz Lang's screenplay.

== Performances ==
The film received its première at the Marmorhaus cinema in Berlin, but the music specially composed by Bruno Gellert was not finished in time, and was not played until several days later.
