= Vollmöller =

Vollmöller is a German surname. Notable people with the surname include:

- Karl Vollmöller (1878–1948), German philologist, archaeologist, poet, playwright, screenwriter, and aircraft designer
- Karl Vollmöller (philologist) (1848–1922), German philologist
