= Otto Rippert =

German film director

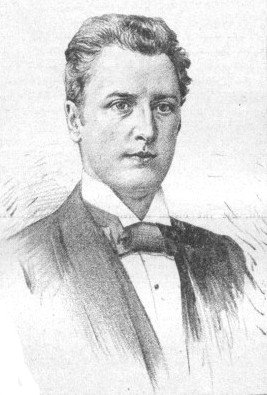
- Otto Rippert, by Jan Vilimek (1896)
- Born: 22 October 1869; Offenbach am Main, Germany
- Died: 15 January 1940 (aged 70); Berlin, Germany
- Occupations: Actor, film director, film editor
- Years active: 1912–1924

Otto Rippert (22 October 1869 – 15 January 1940) was a German film director during the silent film era.

== Biography ==
Rippert was born in Offenbach am Main, Germany, and began his career as a stage actor, working in theatres in Baden-Baden, Forst (Lausitz), Bamberg and in Berlin. In 1906, he acted his first film in Baden-Baden for the French company Gaumont. In 1912 he appeared (complete with stick-on beard) as the millionaire Isidor Straus in In Nacht und Eis, one of the first films about the sinking of the Titanic. The film was made by Continental-Kunstfilm of Berlin, where Rippert continued to work as a director, making some ten motion pictures between 1912 and 1914. However, his reputation as one of the pioneers of German silent film rests on some of his later achievements, for example Homunculus and The Plague of Florence.

Homunculus, produced by Deutsche Bioskop in 1916, is a six-part serial science fiction film involving mad scientists, superhuman androids and sinister technology. The script was written by Robert Reinert, and the film foreshadows various elements of Fritz Lang's 1927 Metropolis, as well as serving as a model for later adaptations of Mary Shelley's Frankenstein rather than the original 1910 version. The subject-matter of Homunculus is similar to an earlier film about a monstrous man-made being, Der Golem (Paul Wegener, 1915).

Fritz Lang wrote the script for Rippert's historical epic The Plague of Florence (1919), the first film (of sixteen, as of 2007) to feature the black plague. The cameraman was Emil Schünemann, who was behind the lens for In Nacht und Eis.

After 1924, Rippert stopped directing films and worked as a film editor. He had a stroke in 1937 and died in Berlin in 1940.

== Filmography ==
Actor

- In Nacht und Eis, directed by Mime Misu (1912)

Director

- Zwischen Himmel und Erde (1912)
- Die fremde Legion (1912)
- Gelbstern (1912)
- Mannequins (1913 film) (1913)
- Zertrümmerte Ideale (1913)
- Scheingold (1913)
- Wie die Blätter... (1913)
- Surry der Steher (The Cyclist's Last Leap) (1913)
- Nach dem Tode (1913)
- Die Mustercollection (1914)

(All the above films were produced by Continental-Kunstfilm)

- Homunculus, 1. Teil - Der künstliche Mensch (1916)
- Homunculus, 2. Teil - Das geheimnisvolle Buch (1916)
- Homunculus, 3. Teil - Die Liebestragödie des Homunculus (1916)
- Homunculus, 4. Teil - Die Rache des Homunculus (1916)
- Homunculus, 5. Teil - Die Vernichtung der Menschheit (1916)
- Homunculus, 6. Teil - Das Ende des Homunculus (1916)
- Friedrich Werders Sendung (1916)
- BZ-Maxe & Co. (1916)
- Der Tod des Erasmus (1916)
- The Knitting Needles (1916)
- Das Buch des Lasters (1917)
- Der Schwur der Renate Rabenau (1917)
- Wer küßt mich? (1917)
- Wenn die Lawinen stürzen (1917)
- Das Mädel von nebenan (1917)
- Der Fremde (1917)
- Und wenn ich lieb' nimm dich in acht...! (1917)
- Die Tochter der Gräfin Stachowska (1917)
- Die gute Partie (1917)
- Die Krone des Lebens (1918)
- Der Weg, der zur Verdammnis führt, 1.Teil - Das Schicksal der Aenne Wolter (1918)
- Das Glück der Frau Beate, co-director Alwin Neuß (1918)
- Baroneßchen auf Strafurlaub (1918)
- Arme Lena (1918)
- Heide-Gretel (1918)
- Das verwunschene Schloß (1918)
- Die fromme Helene (1918)
- Inge (1918 film)
- Der Weg, der zur Verdammnis führt, 2.Teil - Hyänen der Lust
- Hotel Wasserhose
- The Plague of Florence (1919)
- The Woman with Orchids (1919)
- The Dance of Death (1919)
- Countess Walewska (1920)
- Der Menschheit Anwalt
- Schatten einer Stunde
- Wie Satan starb
- Teufelchen
- Ash Wednesday (1921)
- Susanne Stranzky
- Die Abenteuer der schönen Dorette
- Die Beute der Erinnyen
- Tingeltangel (1922)
- Die brennende Kugel
- Winterstürme (1924)
- Die Tragödie zweier Menschen (1925)
