= Stefano Palatchi =

Spanish opera singer (born 1960)

Stefano Palatchi Ribera (born 26 March 1960), known publicly as Stefano Palatchi, is a Spanish opera singer who has sung leading bass roles in Spain and internationally and is noted for his stage skills, timbre, and expressiveness. His concert repertoire includes Mozart's Requiem and Verdi's Messa da Requiem which he has sung many times.

== Biography ==
=== Background ===
Palatchi was born in Barcelona.

His mother had studied under Conchita Badía, teacher of Montserrat Caballe. Palatchi himself had started to study singing at age 15 under Maya Maiska. He began singing zarzuela and then opera:

Un día, mientras estaba tomando clase con el maestro Puig, llegó Luis Andreu Marfà, entonces director artístico del Liceo, y me oyó cantar. Le gusté y me propuso interpretar un pequeño papel en Lohengrin de Wagner. Ese fue mi debut.

One day, as I was taking class with my teacher Puig, in came Luis Andreu Marfà, then artistic director of the Liceu, and he heard me sing. He liked me and proposed that I play a small role in Wagner's Lohengrin. That was my debut.

He went on to study under Gino Bechi, Ettore Campogalliani, and Armen Boyajian, with further studies in Florence and New York.

=== Career ===
Palatchi debuted in the Gran Teatre del Liceu in Barcelona, in 1986. He also performed in Turandot, when the Liceu was reopened in 1999, following the fire which had destroyed the theatre five years earlier.

He has taken part in several hundred performances of more than thirty operas from a wide repertoire, in particular operas by Giuseppe Verdi and Giacomo Puccini, and those from the bel canto repertoire including: Rigoletto, Aida, Turandot, Il trovatore, La bohème, Macbeth, Lucia di Lammermoor, La forza del destino and Il barbiere di Siviglia, Samson et Dalila, and Thaïs.

He has sung in world premières of Cristóbal Colón, by Leonardo Balada (with Montserrat Caballé and José Carreras), Gaudí, by Joan Guinjoan and Joc de Mans by Alberto García Detesters. In 2009, he partook in the Spanish premiere of Cristóbal Halffter's opera, Lazaro, and Tales of Hoffmann

Palatchi has sung in theaters and festivals outside of Spain, including New York's Metropolitan Opera, where he made his debut in 1994 as Colline in La bohème.

=== Activities ===
Palatchi supports the Clarós Foundation dedicated to the prevention of and research into acute deafness. As part of his support, he recites to raise funds for the charity.

== Works ==
=== Television ===
Palatchi has appeared on television for opera performances, including:

- Aida (2003)
- Margarita la tornera (2000)
- Die Meistersinger von Nürnberg (1989)
- La Gioconda (1988)

=== Discography ===
Palatchi has recorded for Decca, RTVE Música, Columna Música, Nightingale Classics, Koch Discover, Astrée Auvidis, Auvidis, Auvidis Valois, Sello Autor, Naxos and Opus Arte.

=== Repertoire ===
Opera repertoire
Role	Title	Composer
Rocco	Fidelio	Beethoven
Oroveso	Norma	Bellini
Conte Rodolfo	La sonnambula	Bellini
Enrico VIII	Anna Bolena	Donizetti
Baldassarre	La favorita	Donizetti
Il Prefetto	Linda di Chamounix	Donizetti
Raimondo	Lucia di Lammermoor	Donizetti
Talbot	Maria Stuarda	Donizetti
Méphistophélès	Faust	Gounod
Frěre Laurent	Roméo et Juliette	Gounod
Il podestà	Una cosa rara	Martín y Soler
Don Diěgue	Le Cid	Massenet
Palémon	Thaïs	Massenet
Le Bailli	Werther	Massenet
El ogro	El gato con botas	Montsalvatge
Sarastro	Die Zauberflöte	Mozart
Il Commendatore	Don Giovanni	Mozart
Timor	Turandot	Puccini
Colline	La bohème	Puccini
Vieill Hébreu	Samson et Dalila	Saint-Saëns
Perot	El giravolt de maig	Toldrá
Ramfis, il Re	Aida	Verdi
Filippo II, inquisitore	Don Carlo	Verdi
Padre Guardiano	La forza del destino	Verdi
Silva	Ernani	Verdi
Walter, Wurm	Luisa Miller	Verdi
Banquo	Macbeth	Verdi
Sparafucile	Rigoletto	Verdi
Jacopo Fiesco	Simon Boccanegra	Verdi
Jorg	Stiffelio	Verdi
Ferrando	Il trovatore	Verdi
Palemon	L'enfance du Christ	Berlioz
Prince Bouillon	Adriana Lecouvreur	Cilea

He has expanded his repertoire into Jazz (2012), Russian Folk, and Swing (2014), the last of which has earned him the epithet "Crooner" in Spain.

== Awards ==
In 2000, Palatchi received a Latin Grammy Award for Tomás Bretón's zarzuela, La Dolores.

He was nominated for another Latin Grammy for Ruperto Chapí's Margarita la Tornera (2003) and a Grammy Award for El gato con botas, by Xavier Montsalvatge.

== See also ==
- Liceu
- Bass (vocal range)
- Latin Grammy Award for Best Classical Album
- 4th Annual Latin Grammy Awards
- Margarita la tornera
