= The Miracle (play) =

1911 play by Karl Vollmöller

1924 performance of The Miracle at the Century Theatre, New York City

The Miracle (German: Das Mirakel) is a 1911 wordless play by Karl Vollmöller with integral and accompanying music by Engelbert Humperdinck as well as church songs and sacred chants. It is sometimes referred to as a pantomime; it is not considered a ballet, although it contains dance interludes.

Three movie versions have been made of the work, and one of these launched the career of the author's wife Maria Carmi, who went on to star in 25 silent films.

== Plot ==
Vollmöller's play wordlessly tells the story of a wayward nun who deserts her convent with a knight, influenced by the music of an evil minstrel. A statue of the Virgin Mary comes to life and takes the physical place of the nun (as a type of Doppelgängerin), who makes her way through the world and its many vicissitudes. She is eventually accused of witchcraft, but escapes. Finally, the nun returns to the convent with her dying infant, and is forgiven as the statue of the Madonna resumes its place.

== History ==
Charles B. Cochran, writing about Max Reinhardt in his autobiography, Showman Looks On: "Our first close association was with the creation of The Miracle, which arose from a suggestion made to him by me in the café at Budapest that he should produce for me a mystery play of the Middle Ages.... At the café table Reinhardt gave me a letter of introduction to Karl Vollmoller who, on my suggestion, prepared a scenario. It was accepted, and I worked in close collaboration with Max Reinhardt, Ernst Stern and Engelbert Humperdinck, until it was produced at Olympia in 1911."

The play first appeared as a vast spectacle-pantomime directed by Max Reinhardt at the London Olympia on 23 December 1911, with principal actors, cast and musical performers numbering around 1,700. The music was specially composed by Engelbert Humperdinck, who suffered a stroke while conducting one of the performances at the indoor arena.

Thereafter the production toured continental Europe, ending in Berlin at the Zirkus Busch on 13 May 1914. (Note: List of initial European performances of The Miracle (play) (source: Styan 1982, pp. 136–150): 1912: 15 September – Vienna Rotunde; October – Elberfeld, Breslau, Cologne; 1913: January – Prague; February – Vienna Volksoper; September – Leipzig, Dresden, Elberfeld, Breslau, Cologne, Prague; 23 December – Festhalle Frankfurt am Main; 1914: January – Hamburg, Karlsruhe; 30 April – 13 May Circus/Zirkus Busch, Berlin. Two days later the authorised film of the play, The Miracle, received its German première (as Das Mirakel) at the Palast am Zoo cinema (later Ufa-Palast am Zoo), Charlottenburg, Berlin, on Monday, 15 May 1914.)

The play was revived on Broadway in 1924 after a tour of Detroit, Milwaukee and Dallas. The New York version, which opened January 16, 1924 at the Century Theatre was produced by Morris Gest, and starred Rosamond Pinchot as the Nun and Lady Diana Cooper and Maria Carmi alternating nightly in the role of the Madonna.

== Spanish versions ==
The play has its origins in a 12th-century legend which Spanish writer José Zorrilla y Moral turned into a dramatic poem entitled Margarita La Tornera (Margarita the Gatekeeper). The poem differs from The Miracle in resetting the story in 19th-century Spain, as the 1959 film would do, and in not letting the reader know that the statue has taken the nun's place in the convent until nearly the very end. Zorrilla's poem was made 1909 into an opera (Margarita la tornera) by Spanish zarzuela composer Ruperto Chapí. It was his last work before his death. The poem was also loosely adapted into a Spanish film, Milagro de amor, directed by Francisco Múgica in 1946.

== Film versions ==
The play was adapted into film three times. The original authorized version was a British financed, full-length, hand-colored, black-and-white film The Miracle, filmed in Austria in 1912. In the same year an unauthorized German version was filmed, titled Das Mirakel. In 1959 the play was adapted to film a third time, by Warner Brothers, again titled The Miracle, directed by Irving Rapper.

== See also ==
- The Miracle (1912 film)
- Das Mirakel (1912 film)
- The Miracle (1959 film)

== Bibliography ==
- Styan, J. L. (1982). Max Reinhardt. Cambridge: CUP Archive. pp. 136–150. ISBN 978-0-521-29504-8.
