= The Prey of the Furies =

1922 film directed by Otto Rippert

- Directed by: Otto Rippert
- Written by: Willy Buckan; Hans Gaus
- Starring: Werner Krauss; Dary Holm
- Cinematography: Willy Hameister
- Production company: Sächsische Kunstfilm
- Distributed by: Rivo-Film
- Release date: 19 January 1922
- Country: Germany
- Languages: Silent; German intertitles

The Prey of the Furies (German: Die Beute der Erinnyen) is a 1922 German silent film directed by Otto Rippert and starring Werner Krauss and Dary Holm.

The film's art direction was by Artur Gunther.

== Cast ==
In alphabetical order

- Josef Commer as Charles Cruze
- Jsa Dschu-Kwo as Fing-Po
- Felix Hecht as Kapitän Morey
- Johann Hoffart
- Dary Holm
- Georg John as Tom Sprang
- Werner Krauss as Wells
- Nien Soen Ling as Sing Fu
- Ressel Orla as Juanita
- Harald Paulsen as Walter
- Frida Richard as Anna
- E. Von Meghen
- Wolfgang von Schwindt as Olaf Lüttgens
- Eduard von Winterstein as Knut Hansen

== Bibliography ==
- Ames, Eric. Carl Hagenbeck's Empire of Entertainments. University of Washington Press, 2008.
