= Karl Vollmöller (philologist) =

German philologist

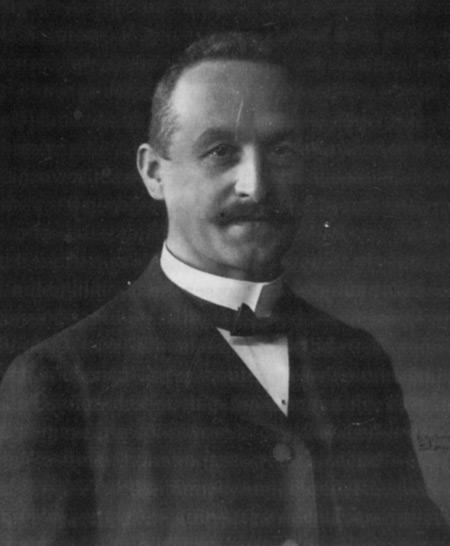

Karl Vollmöller (16 October 1848, in Ilsfeld, Württemberg – 8 July 1922, in Dresden) was a German philologist.

He was educated at the University of Tübingen, the University of Bonn, the Ludwig-Maximilians-Universität München, the Friedrich Wilhelm University of Berlin, and the University of Paris. He traveled in Spain from 1874 to 1875 and became a lecturer at the University of Strasbourg in 1875. He was professor at the University of Erlangen (1877–81), and then at the University of Göttingen until 1891, when he retired, settled in Dresden, and devoted himself to Romance philology.

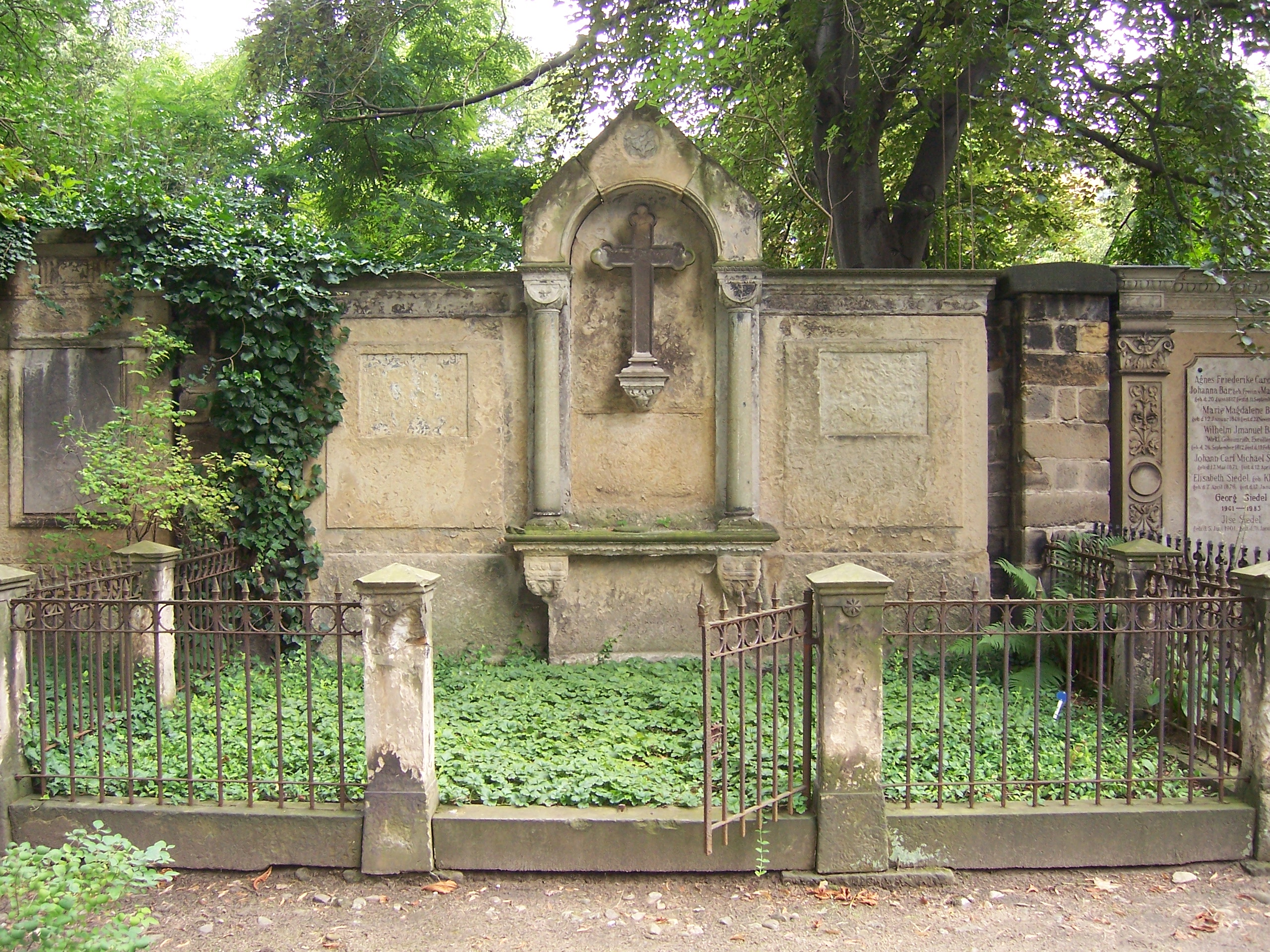
Gravesite of Theodora Elisabeth and Karl Vollmöller at the Trinitatisfriedhof in Dresden

== Works ==
He was editor of Kritischer Jahresbericht über die Fortschritte der romanischen Philologie, an annual compilation (Critical annual report on the progress of Romance philology; 1890 et seq.) In 1902, he founded the Die Gesellschaft für romanische Literatur. He published:

- Kürenberg und die Nibelungen (1874).
- Poema del Cid (1879).
- Spanische Funde (1890).
- Beiträge zur Litteratur der Cancioneros und Romanceros (1897).
- Rezensionsexemplar und bezahlte Rezension (1902).

== Family ==
His nephew Karl Gustav Vollmoeller was a noted screenwriter.
