= List of ships named Noordam =

Several ships of the Holland America Line have operated under the name Noordam (Dutch for the northern compass point):

- SS Noordam (1902) was the first Noordam, a transatlantic ocean liner of 12,528 gross tons built at Harland and Wolff, operating mostly from Rotterdam to New York between 1902 and 1927.
- MV Noordam (1938) was a 10,704 GRT cargo liner built by P. Smit Jr. in Rotterdam, had a cruising speed of 18 knots (33 km/h; 21 mph). In 1942 she was converted to a troop transport and was one of the foreign troop ships under the United States War Shipping Administration in the Southwest Pacific, Pacific and after June 1945 in the Atlantic. She was renamed Oceanien in 1963, and was scrapped in Italy in 1967.
- The third Noordam was a cruise ship launched in 1983. She was chartered to Thomson Cruises in 2005, renamed MS Thomson Celebration, and not active service. In September 2022 to scrap
- The fourth MS Noordam is a cruise ship christened in 2006, and in active service.
