= The Miracle (1959 film) =

1959 film by Irving Rapper

- Directed by: Irving Rapper
- Screenplay by: Frank Butler; Jean Rouverol
- Based on: The Miracle; 1911 play by Karl Vollmöller
- Produced by: Henry Blanke
- Starring: Carroll Baker; Roger Moore; Walter Slezak
- Cinematography: Ernest Haller
- Edited by: Frank Bracht
- Music by: Elmer Bernstein
- Production company: Warner Bros. Pictures
- Distributed by: Warner Bros. Pictures
- Release date: November 12, 1959
- Running time: 121 minutes
- Country: United States
- Language: English
- Budget: $3.5 million

The Miracle is a 1959 American historical fiction film directed by Irving Rapper and starring Carroll Baker and Roger Moore. It is a remake of the 1912 hand-colored, black-and-white film The Miracle, which was in turn a production of the 1911 pantomime play, The Miracle, written by Karl Vollmöller and directed by Max Reinhardt.

The 1959 film version for Warner Bros. Pictures was shot in Technirama and Technicolor, with an original score by Elmer Bernstein. The film was shot in the Los Angeles area, the Gypsy camp sequence was shot in the Santa Susana Mountains around Calabasas, California.

== Plot ==
Teresa, a postulant at the convent of Miraflores in Salamanca, Spain, is an orphan taken in by the sisters there. She enjoys the convent life, despite being a handful for her superiors. She sings worldly love songs to the other postulants and reads secular stories and plays such as Romeo and Juliet. Still, she has a lively devotion to Christ and to His Blessed Mother. A statue of the Virgin Mary, in fact, is held in high regard by Teresa as she goes about her duties.

When the British march through the town on their way to battle Napoleon's French troops, Teresa is drawn to a handsome captain she sees while he waters his horse. After the victory at the Battle of Salamanca the British regiment limps back to the convent which the Mother Superior offers as a hospital for the wounded. Here Teresa learns more about the young captain who had attracted her interest. He is Michael Stuart, he finds Teresa fascinating, and before long he and Teresa find themselves falling in love.

Recovered, the soldiers march out of the convent grounds to be billeted in the nearby town of Miraflores. The seventeen-year-old Teresa is filled with desire for Michael and begins to question her calling. Returning to duty, Michael asks Teresa to marry him; she hesitates, but runs after him. They kiss and Michael proposes that they meet at the town's inn if she wants to leave the religious life and marry him.

Teresa is in a quandary. In the chapel she begs for guidance. When no tangible sign is forthcoming she strips off her postulant's habit, wraps a cloak about herself and dashes off into the night to meet with Michael in the town. At this point the miracle occurs. The cherished statue of the Virgin Mary comes to life, dons the discarded habit, and secretly takes Teresa's place at the convent.

A thunderstorm roars up as the statue of the Holy Mother steps off its pedestal, but it is the last rain the people of the valley will see for several years. A period of drought begins in the surrounding countryside, seriously damaging the local crops. (The townspeople are convinced that the beneficent intercession of the Virgin Mary has caused the area to flourish, and their belief seems to contain an element of truth for the drought beginning with the disappearance of the Blessed Mother's statue.)

The French return to the town and ravage the people. Teresa is nearly raped by a French sergeant, but is saved by a band of gypsies. One of them is a handsome young man for whom the French have offered a reward, calling him Guido the Gypsy. He is the gypsies' leader. He has Michael's watch, which he gives Teresa when she reacts to the tune that plays when the case is opened (Michael had shown her the watch before.). Guido's brother, Carlito, had remarked that he took it from a dead Englishman. Hearing this Teresa is aghast. When the gypsy named Flaco mentions that he had seen the girl at the convent, he laughingly says, "A Christian gypsy - that's a joke." As the other gypsies also laugh, Teresa, now angry with God, denounces Christianity as a lie that deceives its believers. To make her point she rips off a necklace with a crucifix and throws it to the ground, screaming that she is no Christian.

What Teresa doesn't know is that Michael has been captured and taken to a prison camp. After some time he escapes and returns to the convent to take Teresa with him to England to marry her. He's too late, the Mother Superior informs him, "Teresa is now the Bride of Christ," meaning that she has taken her final vows and is now a fully professed nun. Michael pushes past her only to find "Teresa" in full habit - actually the Virgin Mary impersonating her - in a procession singing "Ave Regina Coelarum" ("Hail, Queen of Heaven"). Disillusioned, he leaves to return to duty.

Meanwhile, Teresa, believing Michael dead, falls in love with Guido. The resentful Carlitos, is eaten up by envy and jealousy. On the eve of their wedding, Guido is betrayed to the French by Carlitos. A detachment of soldiers sweeps the gypsy camp pushing Carlitos before them to show them the way. The soldiers shoot a number of men, including Guido.

After the French captain tosses a bag of gold to Carlitos, he is in turn shot to death by La Roca, the two men's mother for betraying his brother. In agony La Roca turns on the despondent Teresa as the cause of this disaster and banishes her from the camp. Flaco decides to act as Teresa's protector as they begin to wander Spain together.

Coming to Madrid, Teresa flirts with Cordoba, a bullfighter while being pursued by the wealthy Count Casimir who finances her career as a singer. The bullfighter is gored in the bullring while smiling at her, deepening Teresa's belief that she the cause of his death as, she believes, she was for Michael and the two gypsy brothers, "I'm bad luck to anyone who shows me any kindness or affection," as she once told Flaco. She also abandons the portrait Casimir had commissioned from "my friend, Goya," leaving him in despair when he discovers her sudden departure.

During the next four years Teresa travels the Continent becoming a celebrated singer. In Belgium on a concert tour, a special ball is being prepared for the British officers stationed there before they again meet the armies of Napoleon, now escaped from Elba. In her carriage, Teresa catches sight of a British colonel - it is Michael.

The two lovers attend the ball. On the terrace Teresa asks Michael why, after his escape, he did not come back for her. But he did, Michael tells her. In fact he is surprised to see her, considering that he had seen her in nun's habit after taking final vows. She persuades him that he must have hallucinated this while he was lying ill at the prison camp. Michael agrees. At the same time he does recall that the statue of the Virgin Mary had disappeared. This news distresses Teresa even more; because she had so loved the statue. Just then word comes to Colonel Stuart that Michael's uncle, the Duke of Wellington, has called all officers to join their ranks. The ball had been allowed to go on as a ruse to fool all the spies infesting Belgium (this is an actual historical event). Michael asks Teresa to pray for him.

Teresa has now come to a crossroad. Because she believes herself cursed she is terrified that Michael will die in battle for having loved her. She goes to a church to pray. There she makes her peace with God, asking Him to keep Michael safe so that he may return to his own people, and not to her. Leaving word with the parish priest, she decides to return to the convent and leaves with Flaco in a coach.

The next day, Michael leads the cavalry charge that finally breaks the ranks of Napoleon's soldiers. A cannonball explodes near him. Wellington sees Michael fall from his horse. Bodies litter the field but Michael comes to his senses. Picking up his helmet, he sees where shrapnel has torn a slice across it. It appears that Michael has been saved through divine intervention.

Michael returns to Teresa's flat. She has sent the priest to tell him of her decision and to deliver a letter to him in which Teresa begs Michael not to follow her. She must return to her true vocation. In anguish Michael asks the priest for his spiritual guidance, knowing that he must respect Teresa's choice and do what is right by letting her go.

Back in Salamanca Teresa finds the region suffering a drought "for four years now," as a woman tells her - ever since the statue of the Virgin Mary disappeared. Bidding farewell to Flaco, Teresa enters the chapel she'd left so long ago and prays. Weeping, she prostrates herself on the floor as the Blessed Virgin enters, pauses to bless her, and then returns to the pedestal that had been for so long vacant. When she looks up, Teresa finds the statue returned to its pedestal and gazes on it in awe.

Immediately, a thunderstorm erupts, the drought is over. The joyous people of the town come to the chapel of the convent, including Flaco. As the nuns and postulants assemble for prayer, they are struck with the realization that the statue of the Virgin Mary is back in its place and Teresa is kneeling in front of it, properly habited, firmly in prayer. Everyone is struck by what is considered the miraculous reappearance of the statue and join in singing Mozart's beautiful motet, Ave verum corpus.

== Cast ==
- Carroll Baker as Teresa
- Roger Moore as Michael
- Walter Slezak as Flaco
- Vittorio Gassman as Guido
- Katina Paxinou as La Roca
- Dennis King as Casimir
- Gustavo Rojo as Cordoba
- Isobel Elsom as Mother Superior
- Carlos Rivas as Carlitos
- Torin Thatcher as Duke of Wellington
- Lester Matthews as Capt. Boulting
- Daria Massey as Gata
- Norma Varden as Mrs. MacGregor
- Philo McCullough as Officer

== Production ==
=== Development ===
The movie was based on a play of the same name produced by Max Reinhardt, who staged it successfully in London in 1911. In 1912 Reinhardt sold the world-wide film rights to Joseph Menchen, who produced the first authorised film of The Miracle in December 1912. Menchen sold the US, Canadian and all-Americas film rights to A. H. Woods for $25,000, who showed the film in New York City in 1913.

A 1924 Reinhardt co-production with Morris Gest in New York starring Lady Diana Cooper aroused interest in a re-make by Metro-Goldwyn Pictures with Menchen's involvement. However, Woods sold his rights to First National Pictures, whose ownership was established in a judgement of the New York Supreme Court in First National Pictures, Inc. and Woods v. Metro-Goldwyn Pictures & Menchen et al., October 1927. Warner Bros. Pictures acquired a majority interest in First National Pictures in 1928, and along with it the film rights to The Miracle. (Note: A statement on an old Warner Bros. file card (reported in a 1958 article in the New York Times) makes the claim that Warners "bought this from Max Reinhardt years ago." The full story may not have been known.)

Various scripts were written over the intervening years by Ulrich Steindorff, Wolfgang Reinhardt, and James Hilton, among others. The film was scheduled for filming in 1942, and was to have been presented in a four-hour version produced by Wolfgang Reinhardt, son of Max Reinhardt. However, the project was shelved until 1958, when a script from Frank Butler was announced as film-able. The movie was to be shot in the Cinemiracle process in association with National Theatres, (Note: National Theatres Inc. (no relation to First National) was the successor theater company to Twentieth-Century Fox's movie theaters after antitrust legislation in c1951.) but this did not happen.

While the original play and film had been set in medieval times, this version was set during the Napoleonic era in Spain – its climax involved the Battle of Waterloo, with Torin Thatcher making a cameo appearance as Arthur Wellesley, 1st Duke of Wellington (Napoleon is never seen in the film).

=== Casting ===
Following her success in Baby Doll, Carroll Baker turned down parts in God's Little Acre and Too Much, Too Soon. Warner Bros put her under suspension for refusing the latter; she agreed to play The Miracle for the studio, in part because the role was "sympathetic" and similar to a "feminine Faust".

It is possible that Carroll Baker was selected to star in the production as a way for Warner Brothers to make peace with the Catholic Church in the United States and "rehabilitate" her reputation in the eyes of the Church. The Legion of Decency, a Catholic film review board, had denounced Baker's suggestive performance in Baby Doll four years earlier, placing that film on its "Condemned" list. Such a drastic classification had seldom been given to any domestic releases due to the strict enforcement of the Motion Picture Production Code in the film industry. Francis Cardinal Spellman, then archbishop of New York, had even gone so far as to threaten excommunication to any Catholic going to see Baby Doll. The film's poor box office reflected the Catholic boycott.

Roger Moore was signed by Warner Bros to a long-term contract.

=== Filming ===
The production was filmed between July and November 1958 in part on location at the Santa Susana Mountains.

"Our director was a humorless jerk," recalled Baker later. "Roger [Moore] took so much abuse from Irving Rapper that I was appalled, but he took it like a man and went on to do a very professional job."

Rapper later said the "main trouble" on the film "was casting. The girl who played the nun [Baker] was thrust on me without a test. I was furious. I was floored. The whole thing was unspeakably bad because of her. I didn't even talk to her."

"I was difficult," admitted Baker. "I always wanted things my way. I wanted things to be artistically wonderful, and when I worked with a bad director when I did with The Miracle, I was jumping all over him and saying, "No, you can't do that" and "No, you're not going to have me do this." I was very difficult. He worked with Bette Davis and she was difficult, so I guess the studio thought he would be able to handle me. Obviously I was more difficult than Bette Davis."

It was Katrina Paxinou's first film in Hollywood since appearing in For Whom the Bell Tolls 15 years earlier. "All the people I know are gone," she said during filming. "Where are they? The whole personality of Hollywood has changed. It's not colourful anymore; it's a dull neutral."

== Reception ==
Not presented as a pantomime but as a regular epic, the 1959 film was panned by critics, and had the misfortune to be released to theatres the same week as MGM's widescreen remake of Ben-Hur starring Charlton Heston – one of the most successful epic films of all time. Even worse, Warner Bros. had earlier that same year released The Nun's Story, a film starring Audrey Hepburn in which the main character was also a nun having doubts about her vocation, as in The Miracle. The Nun's Story had been a commercial and critical smash hit, gaining several Oscar nominations. Both that film and The Miracle were produced by Henry Blanke, and most likely, one drew unfavorable comparisons with the other.

It was not released in Great Britain until December 26, 1960, accompanied by a large advertising campaign for its ABC circuit release. The film was popular called a "money maker" at the box office.

According to Carroll Baker, the film made money at the box office, but she disliked it so much that she bought out her contract with Warner Bros. This cost her a considerable amount of money, and she later wrote that she regretted the decision.

The Monthly Film Bulletin wrote: "All the ingredients of the romantic Gothic novel are to be found in this travesty of the solemn religious pageant produced fifty years ago by Max Reinhardt. When lovers kiss, the hurricane of their emotions bends trees double. The heroine flees the convent, and all hell – meteorologically speaking – breaks loose. Thereafter battles, bullfights, and the rise of the heroine from poverty to fame, strive to add up to an exciting spectacle. Unfortunately the film never knows when to cry halt, and the result is nothing more nor less than a cloying confection of wide-screen wonders, shot in hysterical Technicolor."

== Home media ==
The film, which was originally shot in wide screen Technirama and Technicolor and projected with a 2.35:1 aspect ratio was issued on videocassette in a cropped 4 x 3 Pan and Scan transfer in 1997, appearing on DVD in a Korean subtitled version. Warner Archive have been intending to release a restored 2.35:1 wide screen DVD transfer of the film for some time, but their plans have been delayed due to technical problems with the original film elements.UPDATE: On November 25, 2025, Warner Archive released a restored version of the film on region free BluRay and the quality of the 16 x 9 / 2.35:1 Technirama image is outstand-ing. The sound quality really does jus-tice to Elmer Bernstein’s wonderful score.

== See also ==
- Das Mirakel (1911 play)
- Das Mirakel (1912 film)
- The Miracle (1912 film)
- List of Technirama films
