= Mime Misu =

Romanian ballet dancer, pantomime artist, film actor and director

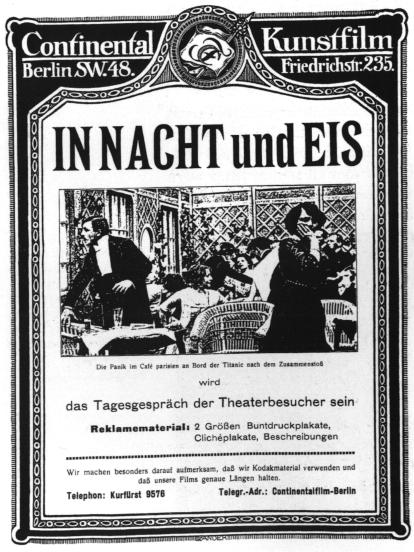
Poster for In Nacht und Eis, directed by Mime Misu.

Mime Misu (21 January 1888 – 1953) (born Mișu Rosescu) was a Romanian ballet dancer, pantomime artist, film actor and director. In 1912 he wrote and directed the first feature film about the sinking of the RMS Titanic, In Nacht und Eis, released in August 1912 four months after the disaster.

== Early acting life ==
Mime Misu (Note: His name is pronounced 'Meema Mischu' in Romanian.) was born in the market town of Botoșani, Romania, into a family of artistes. He was the nephew of the 'world famous' Rahel. He was on the stage from an early age in ballet and pantomime, and he displayed enough talent to be given a free place at Bucharest Art Academy. During his studies he was assigned to the Royal National Theatre, and after graduating with honors he successfully played in provincial theatres in Romania. In 1900 he performed at the 1900 World Fair in Paris, and then took his own productions to Berlin, Vienna, Budapest and London.

== Film director ==
Misu worked for the film production companies Lux and Pathé Frères in Paris before signing up with Continental-Kunstfilm of Berlin in 1912 where he wrote and directed three films: Das Gespenst von Clyde, In Nacht und Eis, and Das Mirakel. Misu made one more film in Germany, Der Excentric-Club for Projektions-AG Union (PAGU). (Note: The producer was Paul Davidson, who also produced the film of the Karl Vollmoeller/Max Reinhardt pantomime Eine venezianische Nacht (1914); Paul Leni's Dornröschen (1917); Paul Wegener's Der Rattenfänger von Hameln (1918) (must find?); Ernst Lubitsch's Madame Dubarry (1919) with Emil Jannings and Pola Negri, and Der Golem, wie er in der Welt kam (1920).)

An article in the Berlin journal Licht-Bild-Bühne in 1914 called him the 'Napoleon of film' (German: 'Napoleon der Filmkunst'), referring to his various technological advances. When Emil Schunemann (the cameraman for In Nacht und Eis and Das Mirakel) called him a barber in his memoirs, he wasn't being particularly complimentary.

Misu went to the USA but only made one known film with his Misu-Film Co., The Money God. In 1915 he directed Ontmaskerd ('Unmasked') in the Netherlands under his real name, Misu Rosescu. Like In Nacht und Eis, this film also contains a scene of a ship sinking.

Misu travelled to the US every year from 1915 to 1917. (Note: Misu's transatlantic voyages: Arrived in the US on 27 October 1915 aboard the SS Frederik VIII from Copenhagen. Ellis Island records. (Free registration required); 4 April 1916 arrived from Rotterdam married to Bertha Rosescu, a Romanian of German ancestry.; 1 February 1917 on the Noordam from Rotterdam. Ellis Island records.) His Berlin address in 1915 was Nachodstraße 25, Berlin-Wilmersdorf. In 1920/21 Misugraph-Film G.m.b.H., had its offices at Martin-Luther-Straße 28, Berlin, according to the Reichs-Kino-Adressbuch.

In 1921 Misu seems to have misrepresented himself as to his level of involvement at Famous Players Lasky, and to have caused some considerable offence. This led to an exchange of letters in the Berlin film journal Film-Kurier. (Note: (Adapted from a machine translation from German.) Misugraph Film Co. The Misugraph-Film Co., of New York and Berlin, is obliged by appearing in a local magazine article, and asks ask us to publish the following information on their foundation and plans: Our company, which was established from the very beginning on the participation of American circles could never be addressed as a smaller company in Berlin. The often mentioned Frankfurt foundation is not in the pipeline, but has long been a fact and is only one part of our complex yet growing organization. Our artistic director, Mr. Misu was the last years in America and had international success garnered back to a time "Miracle" movie - ["Das Marienwunder" is probably meant - website Ed.] "Titanic disaster", as the German film industry was barely able to fly. Doubters regarding business performance seems the personality of our commercial manager, Mr Giesen to be unknown. The economical and professional way just our operations (including abolition of the directors / system) has all chances for themselves. In addition, we leave the final argument confidently our upcoming production onset.) (Note: On the 2nd of this month, we published at the request of Misugraph Film Co. a communication on the importance of this same firm. A group of employees of the company (Famous Players Lasky) which is deemed damaged by Misugraph-Film informs us with the following facts in assessment of the situation, which are intended to limit the spread of rumours concerning the Company's true value: 1. To safeguard their damaged interests, their Counsel (Attorney Dr. Freudenstein, French Strasse 52) is engaged in establishing an "Association for the protection of the victim of Misugraph Film Co."; 2. Herr Direktor Misu spread rumors that he was previously the artistic and technical director of the Famous Players Lasky Co., New York. was equivalent. In consultation with the directors of the latter company, Eugene Zukor [son of Adolph Zukor] and Herr Nachman (currently staying in Berlin), this is non-factual. Misu is not known at all to Mr. Zukor, while Mr. Nachman knows him only as a buyer of the company. Nothing is known of productions which he claims to have passed to them.; 3. As for the management, then the aforementioned Protection Association, the material of almost all employees, artists and suppliers who have come into contact with the company, has to a great extent, have to give the required response.; 4. His rejection of the term "minor Berlin company" is considered invalid, even if some American circles should be involved, since the company in one-and-a-quarter years of its existence has not turned a single foot of film. Also, the number of employees (office, directors, artists, craftsmen) has been so minimal that this term is fully justified.)

Information about his later career and death is uncertain.

== Selected filmography ==
He directed at least six films:

- Das Gespenst von Clyde (1912)
- In Nacht und Eis (1912) (and also possibly played the part of the radio operator)
- Das Mirakel (1912), later Das Marienwunder: eine alte Legende (Note: Das Marienwunder censorship: Polizei, Berlin: Verbot (No. 13.1); Polizei, Berlin: Jugendverbot (No. 13.23); Polizei, München: Verbot (No. 2752, 2753, 2754, 2755); Polizei, München: Verbot (No. 13899, 13900, 13901, 13902); Polizei, München: Jugendfrei (No. 36063, 36064, 36065, 36066))
- Der Excentric-Club (1913/14)
- The Money God (1914)
- Ontmaskerd (1915)
