= Homunculus (film) =

1916 film directed by Otto Rippert

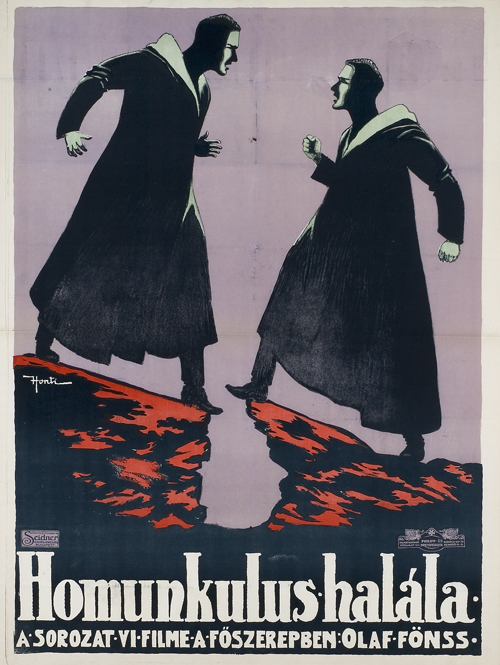
- German release poster
- Directed by: Otto Rippert
- Screenplay by: Robert Reinert
- Based on: Homunculus by Robert Hamerling
- Produced by: Hanns Lippmann
- Starring: Olaf Fønss; Ernst Ludwig
- Cinematography: Carl Hoffmann
- Production companies: Deutsche Bioscop (1916); Decla-Bioscop (1920)
- Running time: approx. 6h (1916) approx. 3 3/4 hrs (1920); 3 1/4 hrs (2014)
- Country: Germany
- Languages: Silent; German intertitles

Homunculus is a 1916 German silent science fiction serial film directed by Otto Rippert and written by Robert Reinert. Other sources list Robert Neuss as a co-writer. Fritz Lang was one of Rippert's assistants during filming. It was originally produced by Deutsche Bioscop GmbH.

Italian print of Homunculus

== Plot ==
A scientist creates a living creature called a Homunculus (a Latin word which means little man) in a laboratory, and the creature strives to find love. When it discovers it is unable to feel emotions, it goes on a rampage and starts creating havoc in a nearby German village. Although it looks human, it is a soulless being. The scientist hunts down the creature in an attempt to destroy his creation.

The Reinert's script is loosely based on epic poem Homunculus written by Robert Hamerling in 1888. The theme of an artificially created being turning against its creator is also similar to the Golem films of Paul Wegener and the silent film versions of Henrik Galeen's Alraune. The plot is very similar to Mary Shelley's Frankenstein, wherein a living creature (called a homunculus) is created artificially in a laboratory and strives to develop emotions like a human being. (Frankenstein had previously been filmed by Thomas Edison in the United States in 1909.)

== Cast ==
- Olaf Fønss (aka Olaf Fönss) as Homunculus
- Ernst Ludwig as Prof. Ortmann
- Albert Paul as Dr. Hansen
- Lore Rückert as Tochter Margarete Hansen
- Max Ruhbeck as Generalprokurator Steffens
- Lia Borré as Tochter des Generalprokurator Steffens
- Friedrich Kühne as Edgar Rodin
- Theodor Loos as Sven Friedland
- Mechthildis Thein as Margot
- Aud Egede-Nissen

== Release history ==
One of the most successful German-made film series produced during World War I, it was theatrically released at the Marmorhaus, Berlin, between June 1916 (preview) and August 1916 (premiere) and January 1917 in six parts running approximately one hour each:

1: Die Geburt des Homunculus
2: Das geheimnisvolle Buch
3: Die Liebestragödie des Homunculus
4: Die Rache des Homunculus
5: Die Vernichtung der Menschheit
6: Das Ende des Homunculus

Only part 4 and a fragment of part 5 from this series is still extant.

After Deutsche Bioscop merged in spring 1920 with Decla-Film to form Decla-Bioscop, the film was heavily edited down to three chapters and re-released with colored tints and intertitles in September 1920.

1: Der künstliche Mensch
2: Die Vernichtung der Menschheit
3: Ein Titanenkampf

A 76-minute tinted version with Italian language intertitles exists in the George Eastman Museum film archives.

Nearly a century later the head of the Munich Film Museum, Stefan Drößler, retrieved 27 reels of the six original chapters released in 1916/1917 from a Moscow film archive. They had been heavily cut up and jumbled, with the intertitles excised, but a restored version lasting 196 minutes was shown in August 2014 at the Rheinisches Landesmuseum Bonn as part of the Bonn Silent Film Festival.

== Bibliography ==
- Workman, Christopher; Howarth, Troy (2016). Tome of Terror: Horror Films of the Silent Era. Baltimore: Midnight Marquee Press. ISBN 978-1-936168-68-2.
