= Irving Rapper =

American film director (1898–1999)

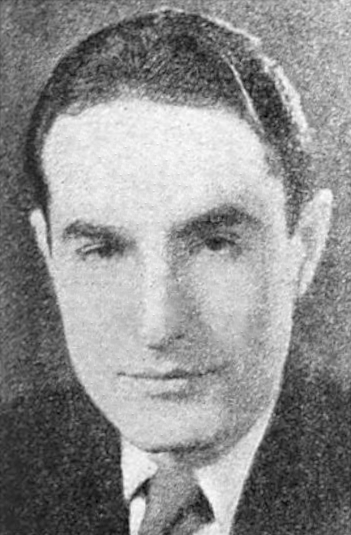
- Born: 16 January 1898; London, England, UK
- Died: 20 December 1999 (aged 101); Los Angeles, California, U.S.
- Occupations: Film director, dialogue director
- Years active: 1929–1978

Irving Rapper (16 January 1898 – 20 December 1999) was a British-born American film director.

== Biography ==
Born to a Jewish family in London, Rapper emigrated to the United States and became an actor and a stage director on Broadway while studying at New York University. In 1936, he went to Hollywood, where he was hired by Warner Bros. as an assistant director and dialogue coach. He proved invaluable in translating and mediating for non-native English-speaking directors. He made his directing debut with the 1941 film Shining Victory, in which his friend Bette Davis appeared as a show of support for him. He would go on to direct her in four more films, Now, Voyager (1942) - selected, in 2007, for preservation in the United States National Film Registry, The Corn Is Green (1945), Deception (1946), and Another Man's Poison (1952).

Rapper's film One Foot in Heaven (1941) was nominated for the Academy Award for Best Picture. Perhaps his best film in a studio other than Warner Bros. was The Brave One (1956) about a Mexican boy who must rescue his bull from a brutal fight against a top matador, which earned the then-blacklisted writer Dalton Trumbo an Oscar for his original screenplay, despite being a box office failure. Additional credits include The Voice of the Turtle (1947), The Glass Menagerie (1950), Marjorie Morningstar (1958), and The Miracle, a 1959 remake of the 1912 hand-coloured, black-and-white film The Miracle.

Biopics directed by Rapper include: The Adventures of Mark Twain (1944), Rhapsody in Blue (1945), Pontius Pilate (co-director, 1962), The Christine Jorgensen Story (1970), and his last film, Born Again (1978), about convicted Watergate conspirator and former Richard Nixon aide Charles Colson.

== Death ==
Rapper died on 20 December 1999 at the age of 101 at the Motion Picture and Television Fund home in Woodland Hills, Los Angeles, where he had been a resident for four years.
