= Karl Vollmöller =

German philologist, archaeologist, poet, playwright, screenwriter, and aircraft designer

Karl Vollmoeller
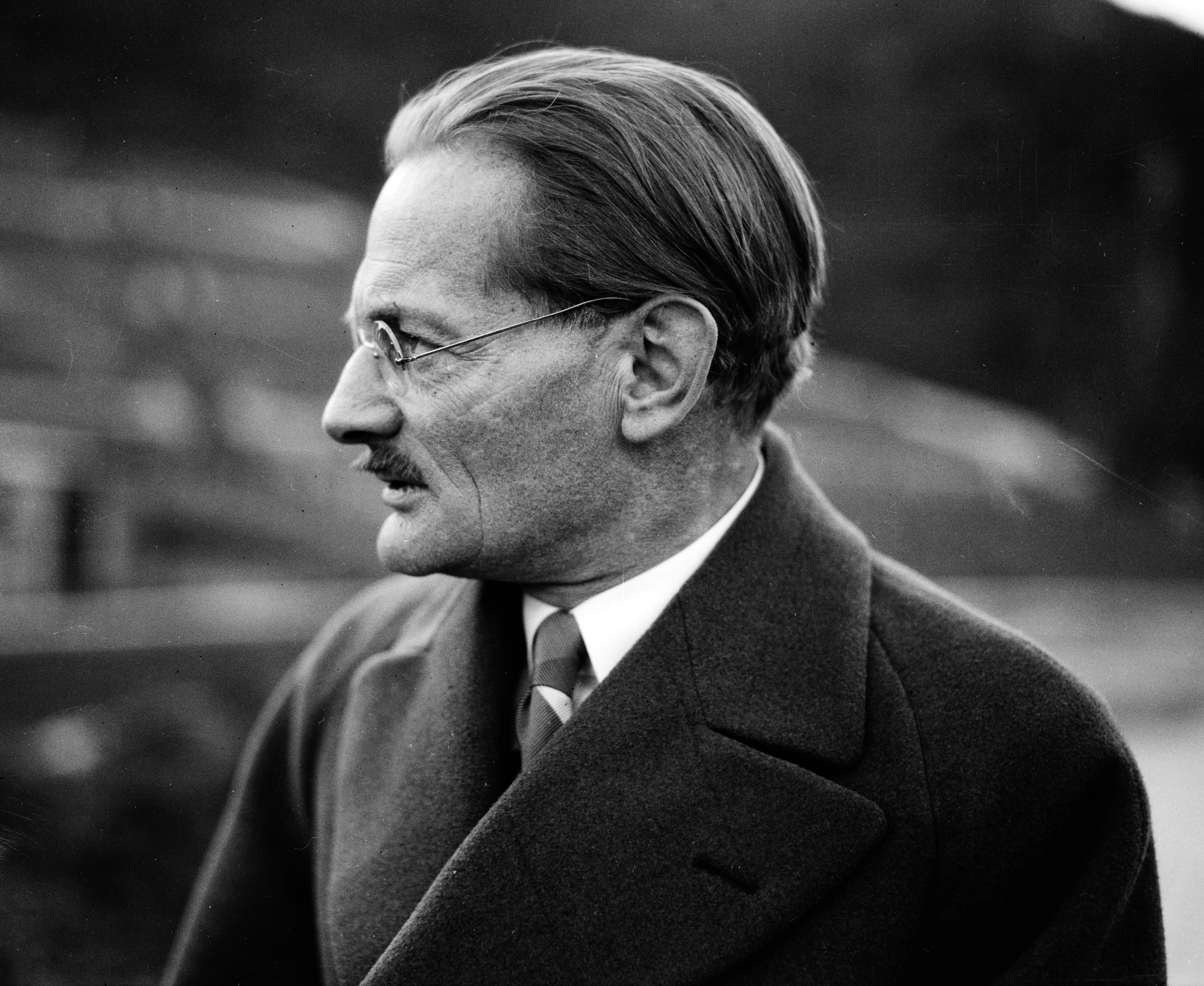
- Vollmöller in 1927
- Born: Karl Gustav Vollmöller; 7 May 1878; Stuttgart, Württemberg, Germany
- Died: 18 October 1948 (aged 70); Los Angeles, California, U.S.
- Occupations: Playwright, Screenwriter
- Known for: Das Mirakel
- Spouse: Norina Gilli (Maria Carmi)

Karl Gustav Vollmöller (or Vollmoeller; 7 May 1878 – 18 October 1948) was a German philologist, archaeologist, poet, playwright, screenwriter, and aircraft designer. He is most famous for the elaborate religious spectacle-pantomime The Miracle and the screenplay for the celebrated 1930 film The Blue Angel (Der blaue Engel), which made a star of Marlene Dietrich.

== Life ==
Vollmöller was born in Stuttgart, Württemberg, the son of merchant Robert Vollmöller (1849–1911), who founded his own textile company (Vollmoeller AG) in 1881 and, together with his wife Emilie, née Behr (1852–1894), became known as a pioneer of social market economy. His uncle Karl Vollmöller (1848–1922) was a notable Romance philologist and Anglicist; his sister Mathilde Vollmöller (1876–1943) married the painter Hans Purrmann in 1912.

He began writing after the early death of his mother in 1894, and went on to study classical philology, art and painting at the universities of Berlin and Paris. From 1899 he attended classical archaeology lectures in Bonn where he obtained his doctorate in 1901. At that time he spent the summers in Sorrento, Italy and published poems in periodicals like Simplicissimus, Pan, and Stefan George's Blätter für die Kunst. In 1898 he journeyed Greece together with the poet Max Dauthendey and two years later joined the excavations at Pergamon led by Wilhelm Dörpfeld, Alexander Conze, Theodor Wiegand, and Paul Wolters. Vollmöller also carried out own excavations at Megara, together with Richard Delbrück. At the same time, he continued his poetry, maintaining a lively exchange with Stefan George, André Gide, August Strindberg, Rainer Maria Rilke, and Gabriele D'Annunzio, whose 1901 play Francesca da Rimini he translated into German.

From 1902, Vollmöller was a regular participant in the Gordon Bennett Cup auto races. He took part in the 1908 New York to Paris Race driving a Zust 28/45 HP and finished third. In September 1912 he was involved in a road accident while driving through Innsbruck, when his car hit and killed a five-year-old girl running out onto the street. Vollmöller and his brother Hans Robert also had been working as aircraft designers; four prototypes were built until 1910, a motorised aeroplane is today on display at the Flugwerft Schleissheim aviation museum.

From 1904 Vollmöller translated classical dramas by Sophocles and Aischylos into German. His Antigone and Oresteia adaptions were staged several times by the famous theatre director Max Reinhardt, the beginning of a long-term successful collaboration. In 1911 both wrote The Miracle in which Vollmöller cast his own wife Maria Carmi in the leading role. The Miracle retold an old legend about a nun in the Middle Ages who runs away from her convent with a knight, and subsequently has several mystical adventures, eventually leading to her being accused of witchcraft. During her absence, the statue of the Virgin Mary in the convent's chapel comes to life and takes the nun's place in the convent until her safe return. The play opened in Germany in 1911 and subsequently in London and on Broadway in 1924. Filmed twice as a silent movie, it was filmed once again in a much-altered version (with dialogue) in widescreen and Technicolor in 1959.

== Source ==
- Frederik D. Tunnat: Karl Vollmoeller. Ein kosmopolitisches Leben im Zeichen des Mirakels. Tredition, Hamburg 2008, ISBN 978-3-86850-235-0.
- Frederik D. Tunnat: Karl Vollmoeller. Dichter und Kulturmanager. Eine Biographie. Tredition, Hamburg 2008; Neubearbeitung MBS, Rotterdam 2019, ISBN 978-94-6386-524-1.

== Selected filmography ==
- The Miracle, directed by Michel-Antoine Carré and Max Reinhardt (1912, based on the play The Miracle)
- Das Mirakel, directed by Mime Misu (1912, unofficial based on the play The Miracle)
- Eine venezianische Nacht, directed by Max Reinhardt (1913, based on the ballet-pantomime Venezianische Abenteuer eines jungen Mannes)
- The Miracle, directed by Irving Rapper (1959, based on the play The Miracle)

=== Screenwriter ===
- Der Hermelinmantel, directed by Walter Schmidthässler (1915)
- Inge Larsen, directed by Hans Steinhoff (1923)
- Song, directed by Richard Eichberg (1928)
- Lady of the Pavements, directed by D. W. Griffith (1929)
- The Blue Angel, directed by Josef von Sternberg (1930)
- Hundred Days (1935), directed by Franz Wenzler (1935, German adaptation of an Italian screenplay)
- The Shanghai Gesture, directed by Josef von Sternberg (1941, uncredited)
- The Blue Angel, directed by Edward Dmytryk (1959. Remake of The Blue Angel)
