= In Nacht und Eis =

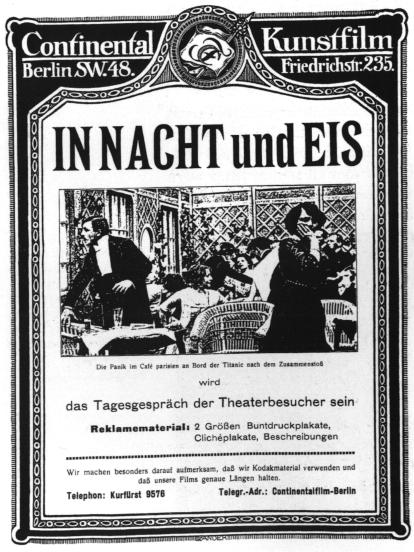
- Theatrical release poster
- Directed by: Mime Misu
- Starring: Waldemar Hecker; Otto Rippert; Ernst Rückert
- Music by: Joel McNeely (2006 reissue)
- Distributed by: Continental-Kunstfilm
- Release date: August 17, 1912
- Running time: 35 minutes
- Country: Germany
- Languages: Silent film German intertitles

In Nacht und Eis (English: "In Night and Ice"), also called Der Untergang der Titanic ("The Sinking of the Titanic") and Shipwrecked in Icebergs in the US, is a 1912 German silent disaster drama film about the sinking of the British ocean liner Titanic which occurred that year. Released four months after the sinking, it is the second known film made (the first being Saved from the Titanic), and the first surviving one, about the disaster.

== Plot ==
In Nacht und Eis (1912)

The film starts out with the passengers boarding at Southampton Harbour. The lives of the passengers on board the ill-fated ocean liner are depicted. On the fateful night, Titanic strikes an iceberg, throwing the diners in the Café Parisien to the side. Panic strikes the passengers as the crew ready the lifeboats, despite the fact that there are not enough of them. Women and children are loaded, while the men are held back. The radio operators (who take up most of the sinking part of the film) send out an SOS. Fire blows out of the funnels during the sinking and then the boilers explode. The ship's band is repeatedly shown playing musical pieces, the titles of which are shown on captions; the hymn, "Nearer, My God, to Thee" is played. As the radio room floods, the Captain calls out to the passengers, "Be British!" and finally the Captain releases the operators from their duty but both are willing to remain on the ship. As Titanic sinks, the captain saves a drowning man and takes him to a lifeboat but he refuses a spot and declares he will follow his ship; swimming away, he flounders in the waves and submerges, as his cap floats in the water.

== Cast ==
- Otto Rippert as the Captain
- Ernst Rückert as the First Officer
- Waldemar Hecker as the first wireless operator
- Mime Misu as the second wireless operator

== Production ==
The film was produced by Continental-Kunstfilm of Berlin, and directed by the Romanian Mime Misu. While most of its footage was shot in a glasshouse studio in the rear courtyard of the offices at 123 Chausseestrasse, some footage was shot in Hamburg, and some was possibly done aboard the German ocean liner Kaiserin Auguste Victoria, then docked at Hamburg. The Café Parisien scenes were filmed in the vessel's Winter Garden. The Berlin Fire Department provided water to use for the sinking scenes. The filming began in May 1912, and the film premiered in August 1912. The Captain and First Officer are played by Otto Rippert and Ernst Rückert respectively.

With a running time of 35 minutes, In Nacht und Eis was three times longer than the average film of 1912. Shot in black and white, various scenes were tinted to heighten their impact, such as night scenes in dark blue and a shot of a stoker feeding a burner in red. In one scene, a title card reads: Der kleine Milliardenerbe, welcher mit seinem Kindermädchen gerettet wurde, weil sich die ganze Familie opferte, um den Namen zu erhalten which translates to "The little inheritor of billions, who was rescued by his nanny to preserve the [family] name, since the whole family sacrificed themselves." This related to the true story of the Allison family which were traveling in First Class, whose baby Trevor escaped the Titanic with his nanny Alice Cleaver, while his family perished in the sinking. The portrayal of the Captain, telling passengers to be British, and saving a drowning man, is based on some press reports report that Captain E.J. Smith was reported to have advised crewmen with the words "Be British" and carried a child to the overturned Collapsible B.

== Preservation status ==
The film was presumed lost until February 1998, when the German film archivist Horst Lange, after seeing a newspaper article mentioning the disappearance of In Nacht und Eis, informed the paper that he possessed a print of the film, after which the Deutsche Kinemathek started working on a restoration of the film, which premiered on August 28, 1998, in Bonn. Various scenes can be seen in the documentary Beyond Titanic.

The film is available in its entirety on YouTube and the Internet Archive.

== See also ==
- List of rediscovered films
- List of films about the RMS Titanic
