= The Miracle (1912 film) =

1912 film by Michel Carré

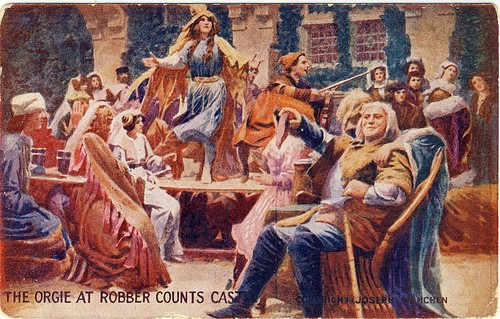
- Scene from the Lyricscope play of The Miracle with Florence Winston, Ernst Matray and Ernst Benzinger
- Directed by: Michel Antoine Carré (film); Max Reinhardt (play)
- Written by: Karl Vollmöller (play and film)
- Produced by: Joseph Menchen
- Starring: Maria Carmi; Ernst Matray; Florence Winston; Joseph Klein
- Music by: Engelbert Humperdinck (play and film)
- Distributed by: Joseph Menchen (UK)
- Release date: December 1912 (UK)
- Running time: 7,000 feet (UK)
- Countries: United Kingdom (American producer with main production office in London, French co-director, filmed in Austria, coloured in France, international cast)
- Languages: Silent film with intertitles
- Budget: $50,000

The Miracle (German: Das Mirakel, French: Le Miracle) is a 1912 British (Note: "The International Federation of Film Archives (FIAF) defines the country of origin as the country of the principal offices of the production company or individual by whom the moving image work was made." See Choice of Original Release Title in Country of Origin as Main Entry.; The film's producer was the American Joseph Menchen who acquired the sole film rights from Max Reinhardt, and from Bote & Bock, the publishers of Karl Vollmoeller and Engelbert Humperdinck. See 'The Stage' Year Book 1913, pp. 293–294. Menchen had offices at 20 Frith Street, Soho, at 20 Villiers St., and then at 3–7 Southampton St., Strand, London WC1. See "Joseph Menchen". The London Project. AHRB Centre for British Film and Television Studies.; Menchen had been resident in London for some time according to an interview with Al. Woods in the New York Times, 9 May 1912. The "little electrical shop at the Bijou" referred to in the report was opened by Menchen at the 'old' Bijou Theatre, 1237 Broadway, after he was made bankrupt in 1905. The press agent for the Bijou Theatre, A. Curtis Bond, acquired the American rights to the Acres kineopticon projector, which Menchen had used to show films at Tony Pastor's Theatre from 1896.) silent full-colour film, using a hand-coloured process similar to Pathéchrome. Produced by Joseph Menchen and directed by Michel Carré, it is among the first full-colour feature films to be made. It stars Maria Carmi, Ernst Matray, Florence Winston and Douglas Payne, and was filmed on location in Austria.

The Miracle was not intended to be shown as an ordinary film in the usual way but was designed by Menchen to be shown as part of a 'Lyricscope play'. This was an unusual (if not unprecedented) spectacular theatrical presentation which – in its most elaborate and complete expression – included: the projected colour film; a full-sized symphony orchestra and chorus performing Engelbert Humperdinck's score; live sound effects such as church bells and crowd noises; stage sets around the projection screen which changed during the performance; and live (non-speaking) actors and dancers in medieval costume. The various component parts of this ideal production varied somewhat according to local conditions.

This 1912 multi-media production was an adaptation of Max Reinhardt's wordless spectacular stage production of Karl Vollmoeller's play of the same name, which had played to huge audiences at the London Olympia exhibition hall in 1911–1912. As some contemporary critics realised, The Miracle was not a "moving picture drama" in the normal sense of the word, but a "filmed pantomime," a celluloid record of the action of the stage production in a unique presentation.

The world première of the full-colour 'Lyricscope play' of The Miracle took place at the Royal Opera House, Covent Garden, London, on 21 December 1912 and it was shown all over the country until Easter 1913, breaking many records for attendance. The colour film with its attendant show subsequently made its way around the world, being shown in the U.S., Australia and Germany.

A rival, unauthorised version (Das Mirakel) directed by Mime Misu for Continental-Kunstfilm in Germany appeared in the same year with the same subject and English title ("The Miracle") and was the subject of various copyright legal actions in the UK and the United States, resulting in seven different titles shared between the two films.

Although various claims have been made that Cherry Kearton and Ernst Lubitsch were somehow involved with this production, such claims are wholly without foundation.

== Plot outline ==
The film tells the story of a wayward nun, Megildis, who deserts her convent with a knight, influenced by the music of an evil minstrel. A statue of the Virgin Mary comes to life and takes the place of Megildis, who makes her way through the world and its many vicissitudes. Later, Megildis returns to the convent with her dying infant, and is forgiven as the statue resumes its place.

Act 1 – Temptation

- Scene 1: The Nun, Sister Megildis is placed in charge of the sacred image.
- Scene 2: The healing of the lame man.
- Scene 3: The Minstrel and the music.
- Scene 4: The arrival of the Knight.
- Scene 5: The Nun must spend the night kneeling.
- Scene 6: The flight of the Nun with the Knight.
- Scene 7: The Miraculous Image comes to life.

Intermezzo

- Episode 1: The lake of the fairies.
- Episode 2: The capture of the Robber Count, and dancing for the Nun.
- Episode 3: The mock marriage ceremony.
- Episode 4: The Nun is arrested for witchcraft
- Episode 5: The Nun is shown the ghosts of all who have lost their lives because of her.

Act 2 – Forgiveness

- Scene 1: Christmas Eve in the Convent.
- Scene 2: The image of the Virgin returns to its altar.
- Scene 3: Megildis returns to the convent with her babe and finds it dead. The Miracle occurs.
- Scene 4: Forgiveness.

== Cast ==
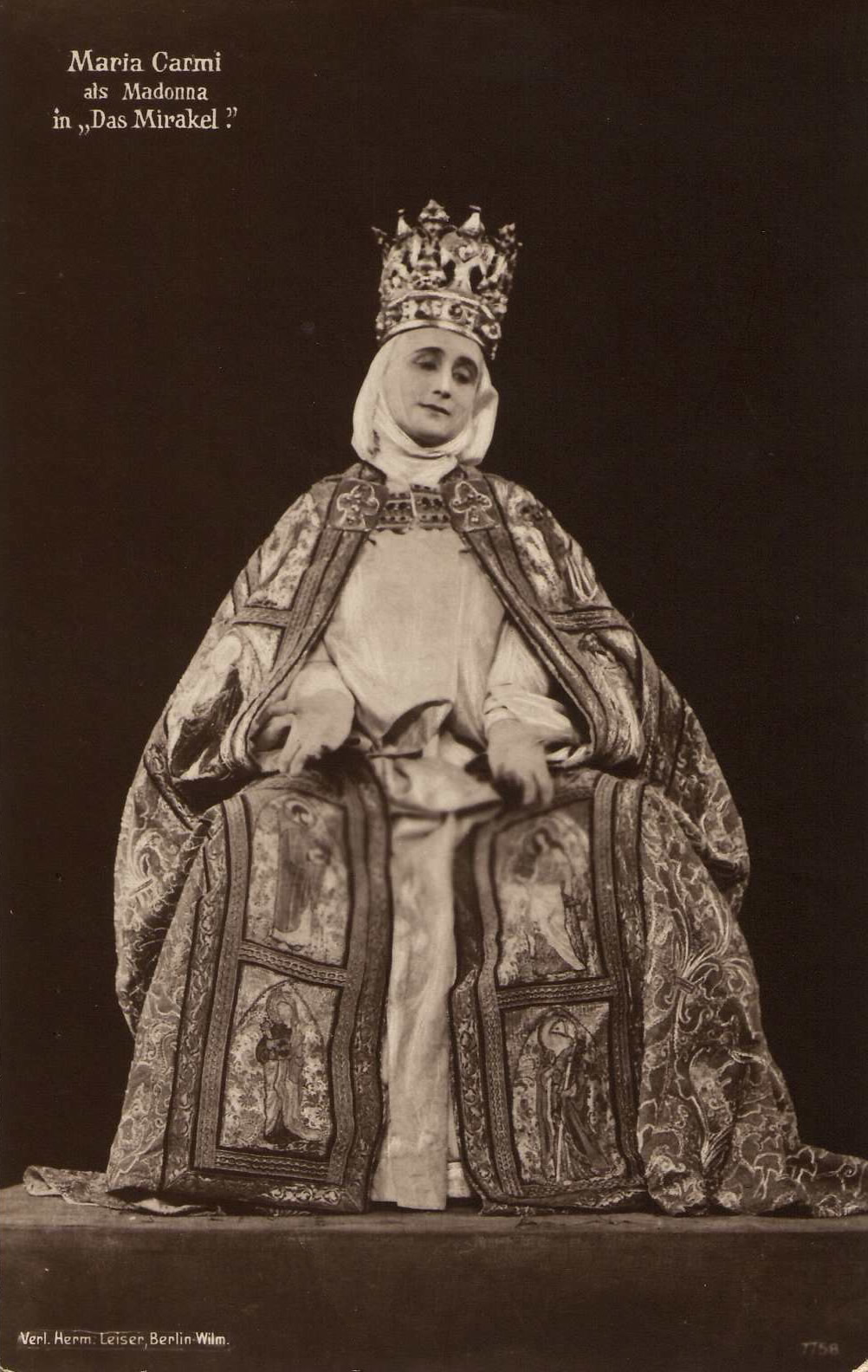
Maria Carmi as the Madonna in a publicity shot for the Olympia production.

- Maria Carmi – The Madonna
- Florence Winston – The Nun, Megildis
- Ernst Matray – The Minstrel (or the Player)
- Douglas Payne – The Knight
- Ernst Benzinger – The Robber Count
- Joseph Klein – The King
- Theodore Rocholl – The King's Son
- Agathe Barcesque – The Abbess
- Marie von Radgy – The Old Sacristan
- Alfred König – The Lame Man

A number of normally reliable sources have been inveigled into thinking that Ernst Lubitsch somehow appeared in the cast in a minor role, or even as the Spielmann or Player. This is absolutely not the case, any more than Cherry Kearton was the director.

All the actors in the film (except Florence Winston) had just given sixteen stage performances of the play in Vienna during the two weeks immediately preceding shooting and were well rehearsed in their parts.

Although some advertising for the film implied that all the cast had been in the 1911–12 Olympia production, this was only true for Maria Carmi, Douglas Payne, Ernst Benzinger and Joseph Klein. Carmi was married to Karl Vollmoeller, the author of the stage play, and The Miracle was the first of her 26 films. Apart from Payne and Matray, who had made one film each, none of the cast had any experience in film acting; between them Carmi, Matray, Payne, Benzinger and Klein went on to make some 160 motion pictures Carmi, Matray, Klein and Rocholl also starred in the film of Vollmoeller's next pantomime, Eine venezianische Nacht (A night in Venice).

== Literary sources ==
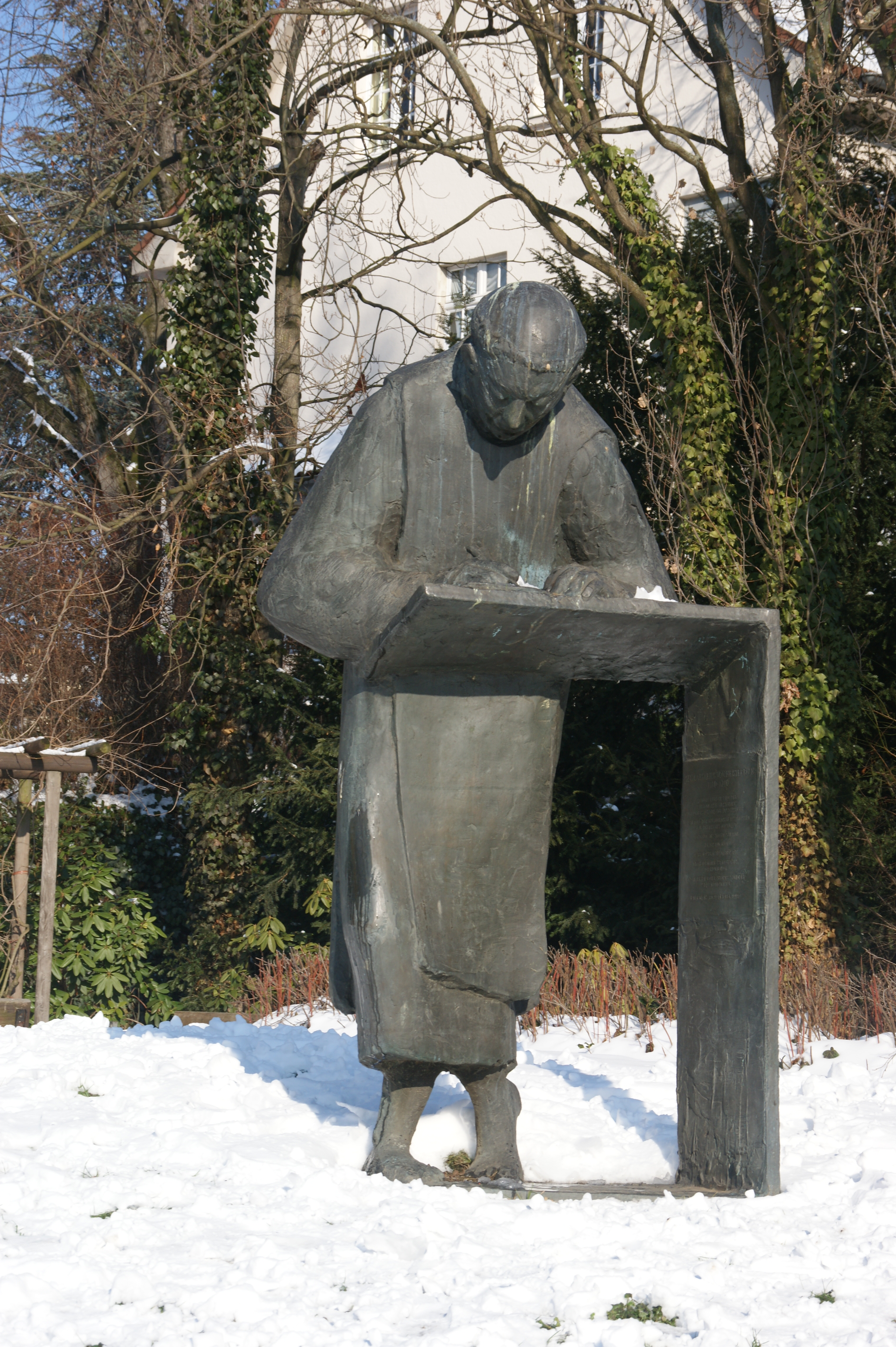
Statue of Caesarius of Heisterbach

The miraculous legend of a wayward nun named Beatrice has been retold many times since it was first collected in the early 13th century by Caesarius of Heisterbach in his Dialogus miraculorum (1219–1223). The tale was revived by Maurice Maeterlinck in 1901 in a minor play named Soeur Beatrice (Sister Beatrice), drawing on versions by Villiers de l'Isle-Adam and on the 14th-century Dutch poem Beatrijs. Maeterlinck described his own work (and Ariane et Barbe-bleue) as "...little scenarios, short poems of the type unfortunately called 'opera-comique', destined to furnish the musicians who asked for them, a theme amenable to lyrical developments. They pretend to nothing further." According to one critic, however, Ariane et Barbe-bleue and Soeur Beatrice "are, in truth, absolutely devoid of serious effort, aesthetic, doctrinal, or moral."

According to Jethro Bithell, "As a reading play Sister Beatrice is ruined by the species of blank verse in which it is said to be written. Typographically it is arranged in prose form; but palpable verses of this kind madden the reader:"

"II est prudent et sage; et ses yeux sont plus doux
Que les yeux d'un enfant qui se met a genoux."

Maeterlinck used the same style in Monna Vanna: "...written, partly, in the same kind of blank verse as Sister Beatrice—very poor stuff considered as poetry, and very troublesome to read as prose."

Sister Beatrice was produced by Vsevolod Meyerhold at the Moscow Arts Theatre in 1906, a production which Reinhardt may possibly have been aware of. Maeterlinck's play was also produced in March 1910 at the New Theatre, New York, with Edith Wynne Matthison in the title part.

While recovering from an illness aged 18 in 1896, Karl Vollmoeller had a vision of the Blessed Virgin Mary which had a profound impression on him, and which later became the basis of his wordless play, The Miracle. In a later interview he recounted: "While living in Italy, I had the chance to become absorbed in Latin manuscripts which told the history of the saints of the Catholic Church. (ie Heisterbach). One of these legends inspired me to write my play known as The Miracle... I wrote this piece (play) all at the same time (in one go), before films were made. I wish to state most emphatically that my play contains a spiritual message for the whole world, not only for Christians."

In another interview in 1913, Vollmoeller said of The Miracle: "The Miracle is not a theatre play in the ordinary sense. It is intended as an appeal to religious feeling. To attempt to cater in a play of this sort exclusively to the rich or the snobbish would be a great mistake. Often the people who would appreciate a play are the people who cannot afford the price of admission. For a production like The Miracle to attract the people for whom it was primarily intended, it must have a low price of admission."

== Production team ==
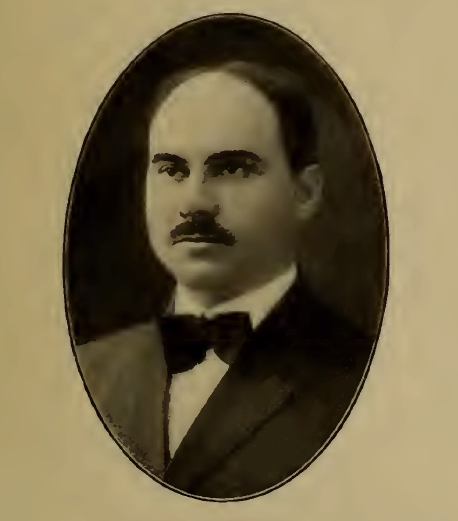
Joseph Menchen in about 1913

The film seems to have been the brainchild of its producer, Joseph Menchen, a London-based American inventor, film projectionist and owner of a New York theatrical lighting business who later became a literary agent for film scripts. Reports of copyright cases in the English and US courts confirm that Menchen made the film, and a review of the film's US première in New York referred to it as "the Menchen Miracle".

Menchen obtained the sole rights and film rights from Reinhardt and from Bote & Bock (Vollmöller's and Humperdinck's publishers), and had "gone to very considerable expense" (£20,000 or $50,000) "in preparing a film of the play, which he intended to produce with Mr. Walter Hyman" (Note: Walter Hyman was the owner of a theatre chain, Grand Centrals Ltd., which operated cheaper-priced theatres away from London's Theatreland: Eastern Grand Central Theatre – Commercial Rd, Stepney, E1; Hackney Grand Central Theatre, Bethnal Green, E2; Grand Central Theatre – Blackfriars Rd, Southwark, SE1; The Carlton Theatre – Tottenham Court Rd. W1; The Majestic Picturedrome cinema, also in Tottenham Court Rd.; The first three cinemas are now demolished. The last two were notorious gay hangouts: the activities there and elsewhere led the LCC to introduce lighting in theatre gangways. (Source: Carlton Cinema at the LGBT History Project.)) at the Covent Garden Opera House on 21 December." Another name (possibly a financial backer) appearing in connection with the production is that of A. D. Rosenthal. The 'Lyricscope play' was designed to be a partial re-creation (on a slightly smaller scale) of Reinhardt's massive theatrical spectacle which had drawn such large crowds to Olympia the previous year.

Reinhardt seems to have been involved in some initial technical discussions about a film of The Miracle (according to a July 1912 article in The Cinema before the film had been made) although he seems to have had little to do with its actual making.

Although much of the 'direction' belongs essentially to Reinhardt (since the movie was intended to be a recording on film of Reinhardt's stage production), Menchen engaged the experienced French film director Michel Carré to supervise the filming. Carré had recently completed a historical film about Napoleon Bonaparte, Le Memorial de Saint-Hélène (1911). He had previously directed the first European full-length (90 minutes) film, L'enfant prodigue (1907), based on his own earlier pantomime with music (Carré 1890); and with Albert Cappellani he co-directed the popular and successful 1909 film Fleur de Pavé starring Mistinguett and Charles Prince.

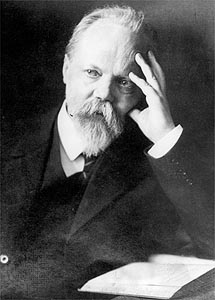
Engelbert Humperdinck, composer of the score of The Miracle

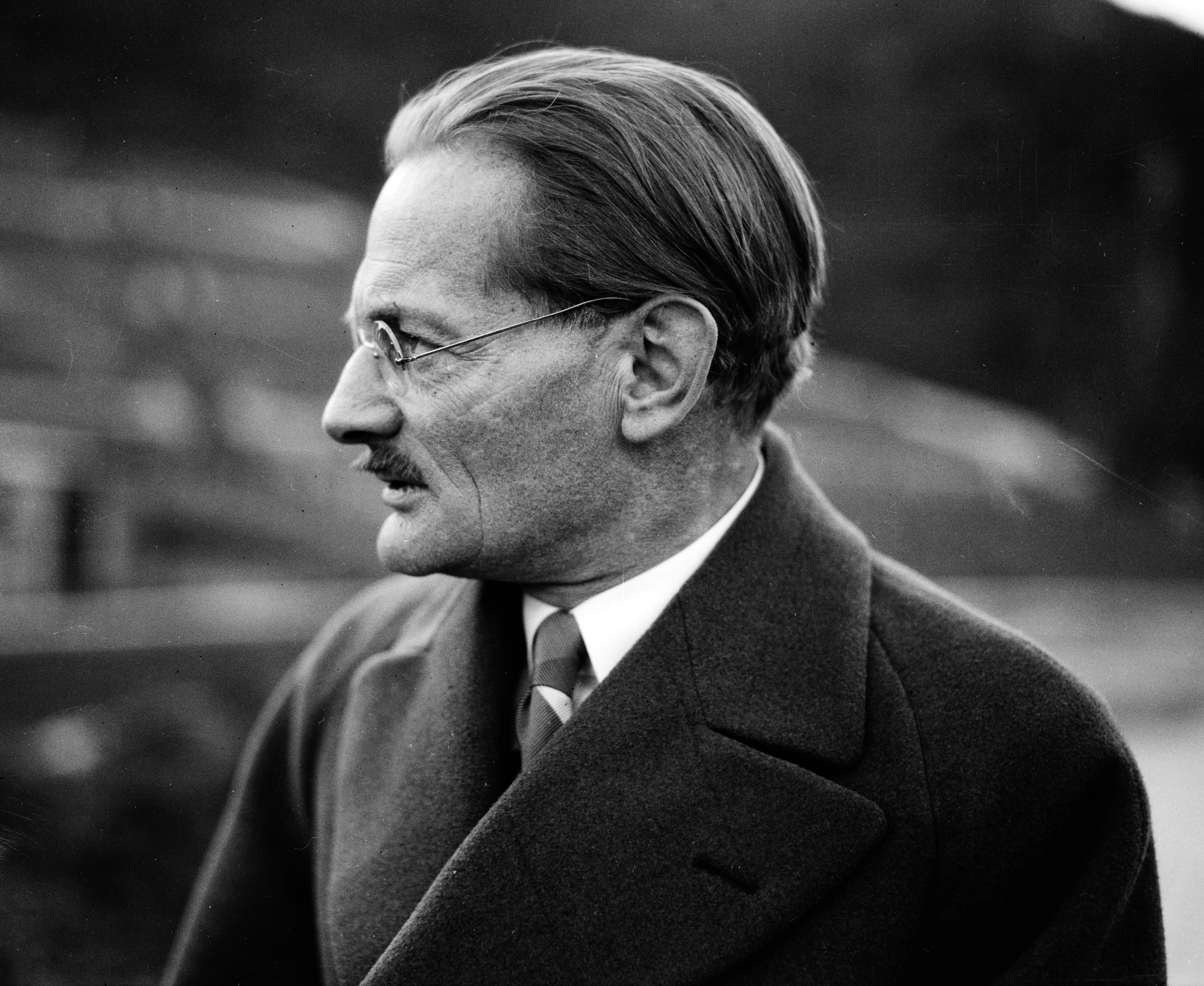
Karl Vollmöller, who adapted the screenplay from his wordless 1911 play, The Miracle

According to a puff piece in a Berkshire local newspaper, Menchen and Carré had "countless experiences" in designing the film's appearance; eventually they devised a method of arranging backgrounds that would "reproduce every phrase of photographic light and shade, together with extreme depth." Before producing the film, Menchen had owned his own theatrical lighting business in Kansas City and New York, having started as a theatre electrician in Missouri aged about 18, and Carré was an experienced filmmaker, having already worked on some 40 films as either (co)-director or screenwriter. Carré and Menchen apparently continued to get on well together; when Menchen opened his new Studio Menchen in the Paris suburb of Epinay-sur-Seine in 1913, Carré became its artistic director, although no films (or very few) seem to have been actually produced there.

The film was designed to be accompanied by the original score which Engelbert Humperdinck had written for Reinhardt's Olympia production exactly a year before. In much of his advertising (he was his own self-publicity agent) Menchen fairly consistently promotes the film as being "accompanied by Humperdinck's glorious music", since it carries much of the weight of both film and play. The vocal score by Gustav Schirmer (which also contains the synopsis of the play above the music) was published in Germany by Bote & Bock in 1912 as Humperdinck's Das Wunder.

According to an article in The Cinema in July 1912, the screenplay was adapted by Karl Vollmöller from his stage play which Reinhardt had produced as a result of a commission from C. B. Cochran for a spectacular pageant at Olympia in 1911. Vollmoeller saw and apparently approved of the film, saying that "it responds in every detail with my original work, with the exception of a few scenes introduced with my consent." However, in a January 1913 interview Vollmoeller appears unenthusiastic about the film's use of colour:

"...a system of colouring each film-scene must be devised independent of the film mechanism itself, as is done by the footlights and other stage lights in a theatrical production. I do not believe in the so-called natural colours for the cinema except for topical films. The reproduction of the colours of nature is not necessary, and nature in these circumstances is frequently ugly. It is here that art should enter."

The stage design and costumes at Olympia were by Ernst Stern, whose set had turned the London exhibition hall (often associated with horse shows) into a Gothic cathedral in 1911. The actors in Menchen's film wore the sumptuous costumes from the first continental performances of Reinhardt's stage show at the Vienna Rotunde; and for performances of Menchen's 'Lyricscope play', the screen was surrounded by stage scenery to make it seem as if the film were being watched through the open doors of a cathedral.

== Production ==
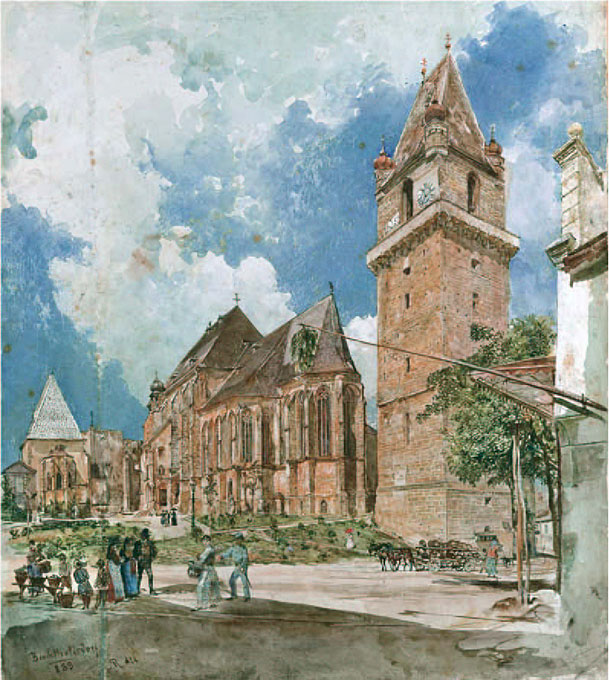
Perchtoldsdorf church, painting by Rudolf von Alt

Shooting of the film took place in various locations near Vienna, Austria, immediately after the play's European première there in October 1912.

Reinhardt's original 1911 stage production of The Miracle went on tour in Europe in repertory for two and a half years and its first continental production took place in the Vienna Rotunda, between 15 September–3 October 1912. The timing of the Vienna première was something of a publicity coup for Reinhardt: the Catholic Church's 23rd International Eucharistic Congress (whose opening ceremony attended by 15,000 people took place inside the Rotunda) had finished at the end of the previous week, providing a ready-made, international, religiously inclined audience.

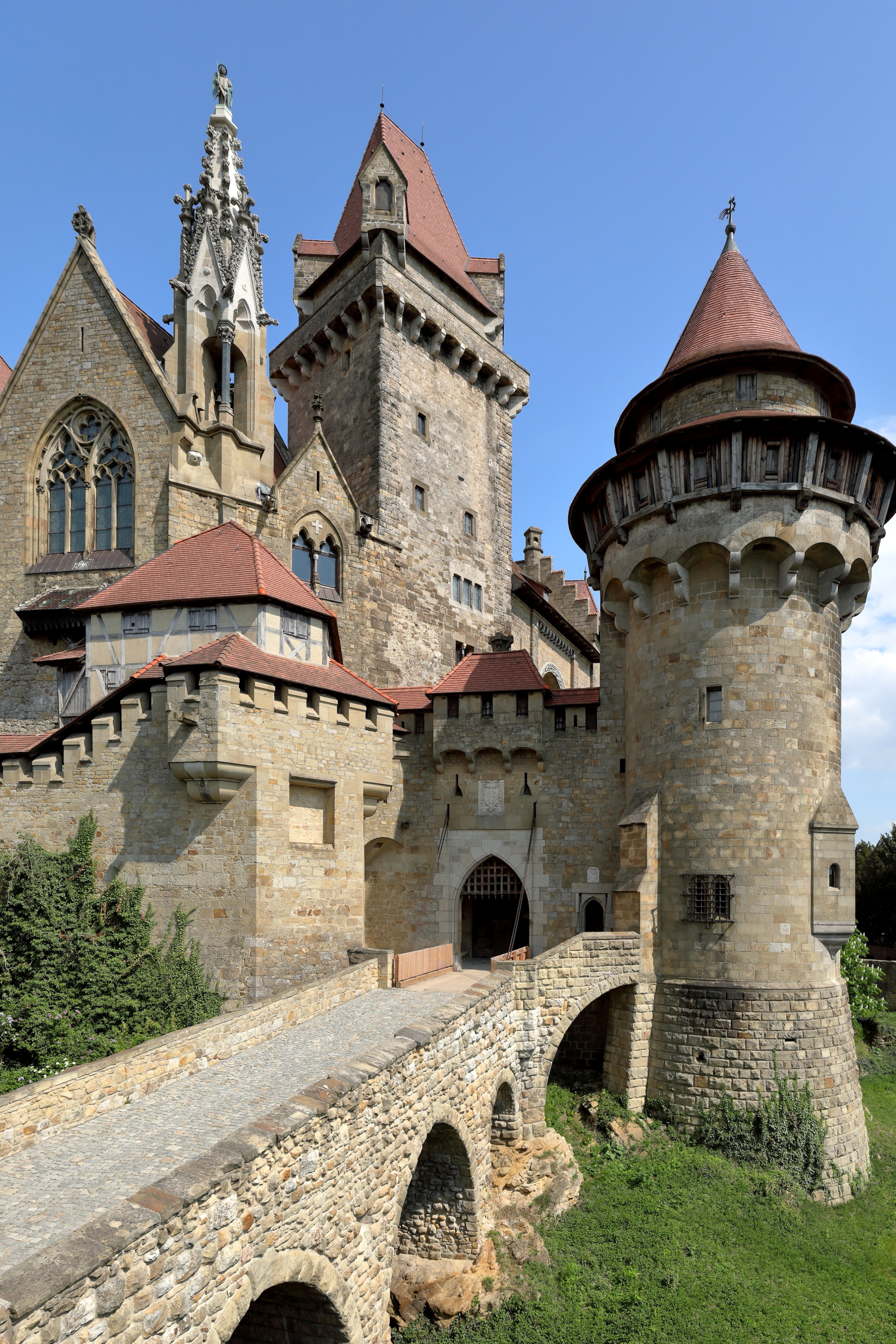
Kreuzenstein castle. This drawbridge entrance to the castle features in one scene in the film.

Shooting of The Miracle began on location in and around the parish church of Perchtoldsdorf, near Vienna, on 6 October 1912, immediately after the stage production had ended its 3-week run at the Rotunde. The small town's population was almost outnumbered by the cast of around 800 actors, who at mealtimes ate at long tables in the street.

For some external shots of the cathedral, the ground was covered with cotton wool to simulate snow, at a cost of 5,000 crowns. Filming continued in the recently completed (1874–1906) mock-mediaeval Burg Kreuzenstein, also near Vienna, Menchen having received permission from the owner, Count Wilczek.

It was shot in black-and-white 35mm film, and one or more prints were then hand-coloured in Paris. The film was originally announced with a running time of about 2 hours (7,000 feet), although it played at 5,500 or 5,100 feet in the US and elsewhere. (Note: References to a four-reel version of "The Miracle" probably refer to the 1912 Das Mirakel made by Continental-Kunstfilm GmbH and directed by Mime Misu (see Which Miracle? above.))

== Performances of The Miracle ==
The film was shown around the world. Première performances (with running times, where known) took place in:

- UK: 21 December 1912 (7,000 feet) — owner of worldwide rights, Joseph Menchen.
- USA: 17 February 1913 (5,500 feet) — owner of rights in the Americas: Miracle Company Inc. (Al. H. Woods, and Milton and Sargent Aborn)
- Netherlands: 24 March 1913 — rights possibly owned by Anton Noggerath, Jr.
- Australia: 29 December 1913 — Australasian rights owned by Beaumont Smith
- New Zealand: April 1914 (6,000 or 5,500 feet)
- Germany: 15 May 1914
- Argentina: 29 January 1916

=== United Kingdom ===
==== UK litigation ====
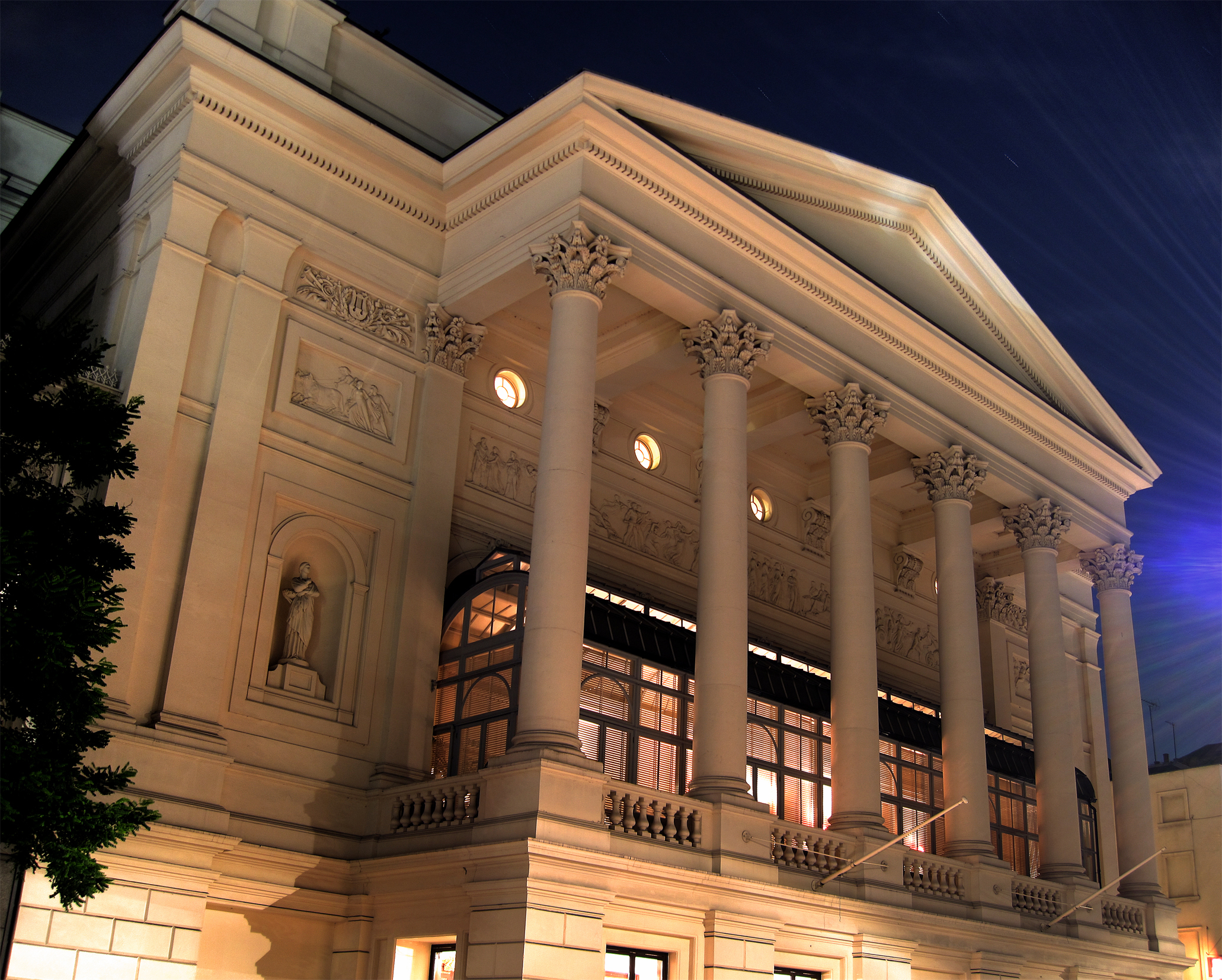
The Royal Opera House in Covent Garden, where The Miracle had its world première on 21 December 1912.

Menchen's film was ready for hand-colouring in December 1912, and he attempted to register it in Germany but was refused since Das Mirakel, a rival film directed by Mime Misu for the German Continental-Kunstfilm production company, was adjudged to have prior right. In London, however, the Elite Sales Agency (the UK distributors for Continental-Kunstfilm) was advertising the film with the English title, The Miracle. The advance publicity implied that it was a film of the actual Reinhardt production in Olympia. Menchen, as the sole owner of the film rights, brought a court action (18 December 1912) to prevent Misu's film from being shown. The judge couldn't rule on the copyright, but he suggested that the Continental version be renamed Sister Beatrice; it was shown at the London Pavilion that same day with the title Sister Beatrix.

Sister Beatrix only received a few single showings in the provinces and was utterly eclipsed by the success of Menchen's film. The Elite Sales Agency ceased trading in October 1913, citing heavy losses.

- See also § US litigation section

==== Performances ====
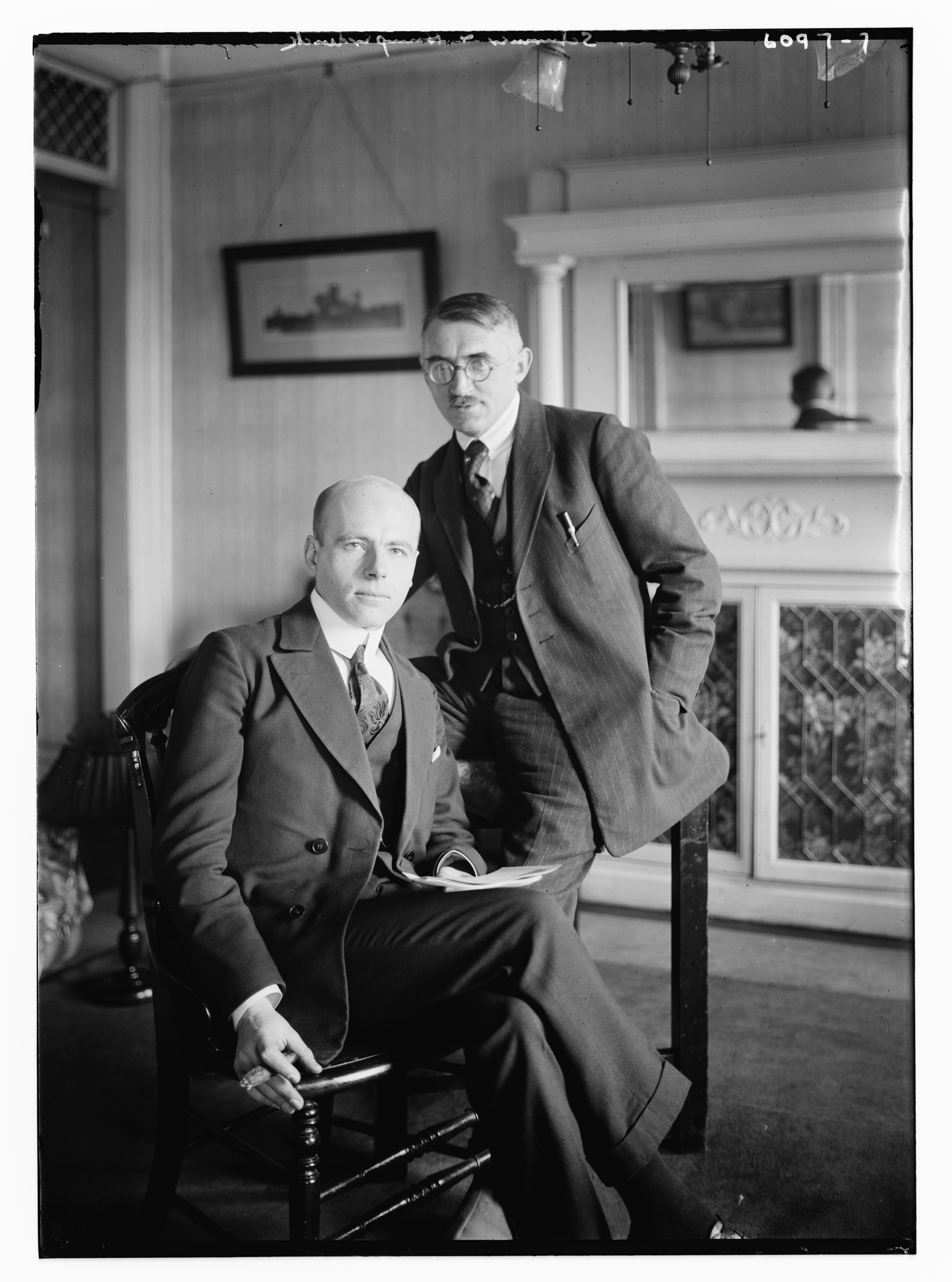
The conductor Friedrich Schirmer (standing) with Wolfram Humperdinck, the composer's son, in 1923

The world première of the 'Lyricscope play' of The Miracle in full colour took place at the Royal Opera House, Covent Garden, London, on 21 December 1912, exactly a year after Max Reinhardt's theatrical spectacle opened at Olympia. The 75-strong orchestra was conducted by Friedrich Schirmer, who had conducted the orchestra at Olympia (London) and later revised Humperdinck's score for the 1924 stage production at the Century Theatre (New York City). The chorus of 60 was conducted by Edmund van der Straeten, who had also been the chorus-master at Olympia.

The Miracle ran for several weeks at the Royal Opera House, Covent Garden showing three times daily (3, 6.30 and 9pm) with chorus and orchestra of 200 performers, for as little as sixpence (2½p). Towards the end of its run, the reported number of performers had grown to 200.

The innovative daylight projection screen used throughout the run at the Royal Opera House was sold by the Universal Screen and Equipment Co. of 226, Piccadilly. (Note: The Universal Screen and Equipment Co. was formed on 14 February 1913, to acquire the benefit of an agreement dated 8 February 1913 between: Packing Materials Association Ltd. (PMA), founded in 1900; John Duncan Blackwell, an inventor, whose father was chairman of PMA; and one Edward Gosschalk, a solicitor; for a secret projection screen process. It was originally registered under the name Anylight Screen and Equipment Company Ltd. and registered at 62 London Wall. The capital was £5,000 (4,950 £1 shares and 1000 1/- shares). The company was wound up a year later at an EGM on 4 February 1914. (Source: "Universal Screen and Equipment Co". The London Project. AHRB Centre for British Film and Television Studies.): John Duncan Blackwell's father, (also called John, like his father) was the chairman of John Blackwell and Sons of Little Green Works in Collyhurst, Manchester, manufacturers since 1841 of tarpaulins and waterproof oilcloth packaging.; In 1884 the company took out a patent for a machine process to automate the manufacture of oilcloth wrapping for cotton bales, and in 1897 John Duncan Blackwell took out his own patent for an improved waterproof cotton wrapping.; John Blackwell & Sons merged in 1900 with eight other small packaging companies to form Packaging Materials Association (PMA). In 1923 Duncan became chairman of PMA, who continuously manufactured his 'patent wrap' until the 1970s. (Source: "Company History". Packaging Products (Coatings) Ltd.); The terminally legally curious may be interested to know that James Duncan Blackwell set up a half secret trust to provide for his four natural children after his death, without embarrassing his family. In Blackwell v. Blackwell 1929 Eng. Blackwell's widow and his son were unsuccessful in contesting the will after Viscount Simonds ruled that half secret trusts were as valid as secret trusts. This is the current state of the law in Canada as of 2012. (Source: Kianieff. "Trusts". Legal and Lit — The Student Council at Osgoode Hall Law School.)) Although it was the first time a film had been shown at Covent Garden, the Berlin Royal Opera had already been incorporating films into productions of Wagner operas to show otherwise impossible scenic effects.

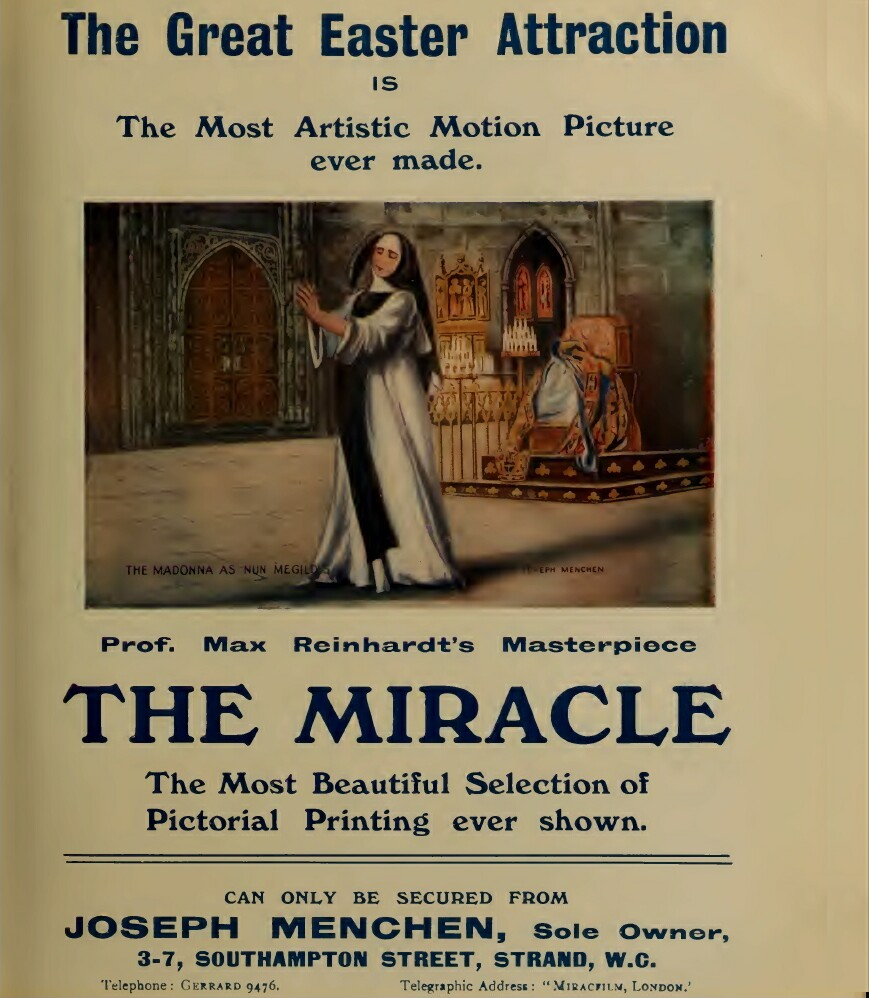
Trade press advertisement for The Miracle, March 1913

The colour film briefly transferred to the brand-new Picture House at no. 165, Oxford Street, London, from Friday 24 January 1913. (Note: The Picture House at 165 Oxford Street (1912 architects: Gilbert and Constanduros) later became the Academy 1-2-3. Re-opening in c.1928 as the Academy, the ICA met in the basement in the late 1940s, and the Marquee jazz club opened in the basement from 1958. with exterior contemporary photo. Source: Eyles, Allen. "Cinemas & Cinemagoing: Art House & Repertory", BFI screenonline. Accessed 18 December 2012. See also interior photographs at Flickr) Before the public opening, Menchen put on a special benefit performance of The Miracle on 22 January 1913, the anniversary of the Battle of Rorke's Drift. He donated the proceeds to the fund for a memorial to a London cabby, Private Frederick Hitch, VC, who fought at Rorke's Drift and died on 6 January.

There was only a single hand-coloured coloured print of the film, and A. H. Woods, the owner of the film rights for the USA, was intending to the exhibit the film in New York City. Woods personally took the colour print with him back to New York, departing on the RMS Mauretania on 6 February. The Miracle opened at the Park Theater, 5 Columbus Circle, on 17 February 1913.

The Miracle continued to show at the Picture House in a black-and-white version, advertised by Menchen (acting as his own UK distributor), as a 'Synescope Play'. which played in smaller auditoriums with reduced forces.

A report of a later performance in July in Windsor describes the general effect in the auditorium:

The scenery was specially built to represent the exterior of an old cathedral at Perchtoldsdorf, so ingeniously contrived that when the great doors are opened the audience see the whole enactment of the play as if it was being carried on in the cathedral itself. The aspect of the screen as one ordinarily sees it has been entirely done away with. [i.e., the screen was surrounded with scenery, like a stage play.]

The Miracle continued to attract large audiences wherever it played, breaking attendance records at Kings's Hall, Leyton (2,000 seats), King's Hall, Lewisham (2,000 seats), Curzon Hall, Birmingham (3,000 seats), Royal Electric Theatre, Coventry and the Popular Picture Palace, Gravesend (Note: King's Hall, Leyton at CinemaTreasures.org. The cinema was later taken over by Clavering & Rose, possibly related to the Clavering who was a director of Elite Sales Agency, or one of his brothers.; The first cinema shows in Birmingham had been presented in the Curzon Hall, Suffolk Street, a hall originally designed in 1864 for dog shows. It held 3,000 people. Its proprietor, Walter Jeffs, had originally included films as a subsidiary part of a show: in time, they became the main attraction. In 1915 it became known as the West End Cinema. Source: 'Economic and Social History: Social History since 1815'. A History of the County of Warwick: Volume 7: The City of Birmingham (1964), pp. 223–245. Accessed 21 December 2012.; Popular Picture Palace: see 'Super Cinema' at Cinema Treasures.) As many as 150,000 people went to see The Miracle during a three-week run at the Liverpool Olympia (3,750 seats).

=== United States ===
The première performance of the Menchen Miracle in full colour took place at the Park Theatre, Columbus Circle, New York, on Monday 17 February 1913.

==== Background ====
Menchen's first choice for a US distributor was Henry B. Harris, the New York theatrical manager and impresario. Menchen knew Harris well, having designed the lighting for several of his shows, and the first letter of testimony at the front of Menchen's 1906 product catalogue was signed "Harry B. Harris". Harris had just lost many thousands of dollars in a failed re-creation of the Parisian Folies Bergère in New York, and had been buying rights to several London shows and arranging for the London appearance of his star Rose Stahl in a production. He may have seen Reinhardt's production during its London run at the Olympia exhibition hall from December 1911 to March 1912: at any rate he bought the rights (supposedly for £10,000) to The Miracle film, according to an interview in April 1912 with the London Standard newspaper: "I have acquired an option on the fine moving pictures of "The Miracle," which I anticipate will make a sensation on the other side.” All looked well for Harris' return to the States, but unfortunately the tickets that he and his wife had booked for their voyage back to the States had the words RMS Titanic printed on them.

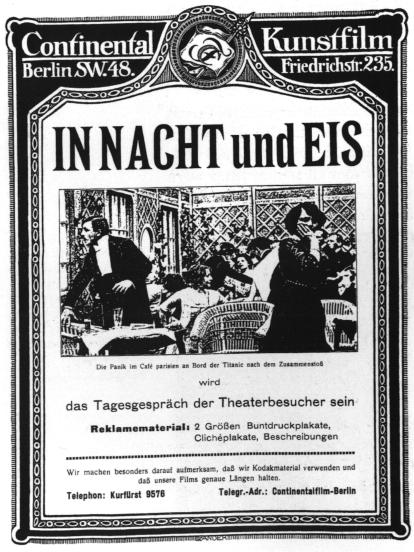
Poster for In Nacht und Eis, directed by Mime Misu in 1912 for Continental-Kunstfilm

Three weeks after Harris's death in the maritime disaster (although his wife survived), a news item appeared in the U.S. trade weekly Variety, claiming that the negatives of The Miracle had gone down with the Titanic; but Menchen replied the following week from London saying that no shooting had taken place. Neither film had actually been completed by the date the ship sailed on 13 April 1912. (Note: In the Titanic's cargo manifest there is an entry for a case of films addressed to the New York Motion Picture Company: this may have caused confusion since it was a different entity from Continental-Kunstfilm's US distributor, the New York Film Company. The NYMP Co. made and distributed films under the Bison 101 name, and merged with Universal Studios in June 1912.)

Menchen's second choice of distributor was the Hungarian-born archetypal showman Al Woods, who had been in Berlin in connection with the construction of Germany's first purpose-built cinema, the Ufa-Pavillon am Nollendorfplatz. Whereas Harris was in the first rank of theatre producers, Woods (while not averse to spectacle) was someone whose shows tended to invite critical scorn or even prosecution. (Note: See e.g. this uncomplimentary passage from the anti-semitic The International Jew by the car maker Henry Ford : "Al H. Woods has but one good eye. It is not his personal loss that matters, but the history of the misfortune which goes back to the time when Al was a member of an East side gang. The common report was that he used to play the piano in a downtown place, east of Fifth Avenue. Mr. Woods is also a distinguished patron of dramatic art — he presented The Girl from Rector's and The Girl in the Taxi, two of the most immoral and pointless shows of recent years. Several times he has secured the rights to certain Viennese operas, which were bad enough in themselves from a moral point of view, but which were at least constructed with true artistry; but even these he marred by an inept infusion of vulgarity and blague." The Dearborn Independent, 22 January 1921.) He had just finished building the Eltinge Theatre, having had a very successful 1911 season managing the vaudeville female impersonator Julian Eltinge in musical comedy roles on Broadway. Menchen himself had worked in vaudeville theatres like Tony Pastor's, showing early films with his Kinoptikon from 1896 to 1899.

In May 1912 Woods acquired the sole US, Canadian and all-America rights to the film of Reinhardt's Miracle for which he paid Menchen $25,000 and formed the Miracle Film Company, Inc., for the purpose of distributing it.

Woods soon found himself immersed in a series of legal challenges involving a rival German film with the same subject and English name as Menchen's. This film, Das Mirakel, produced by Continental-Kunstfilm of Berlin and directed by Mime Misu, was also billed in the UK and USA as The Miracle. The German film was completed and shown in the US before Menchen had barely finished shooting in Austria. Advertisements implied indirectly that it was a film of Reinhardt's Olympia production. The ensuing name changes for the film have led to considerable confusion about which 'Miracle' is which.

- See also § UK litigation and § US litigation sections.

==== New York rehearsals ====
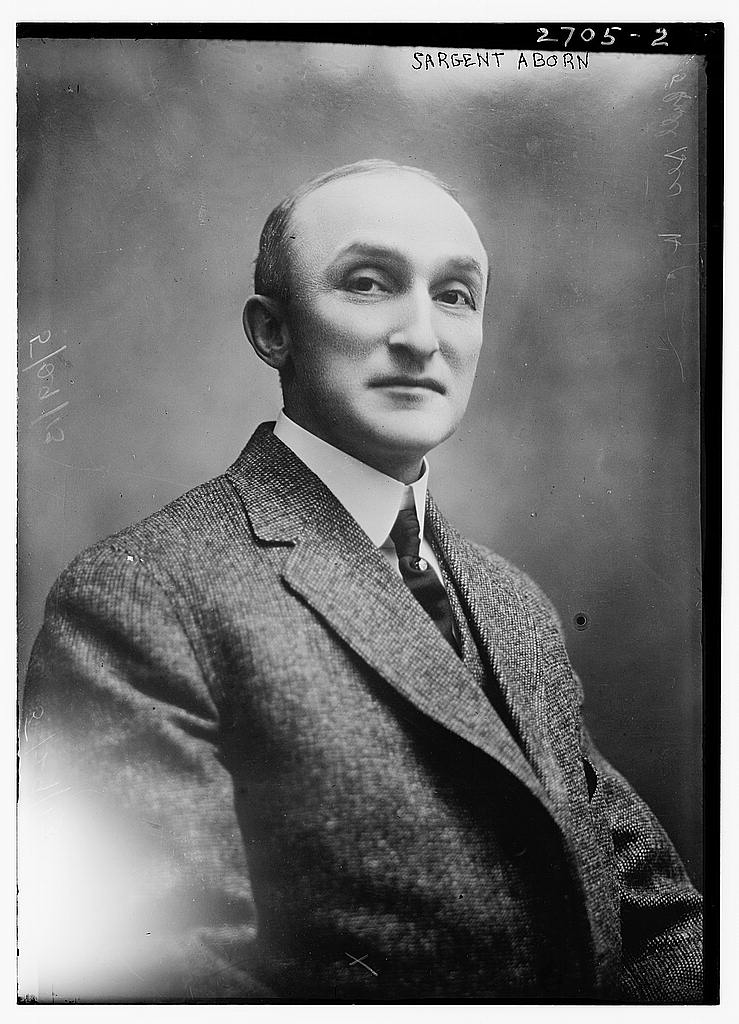
Sargent Aborn c1913

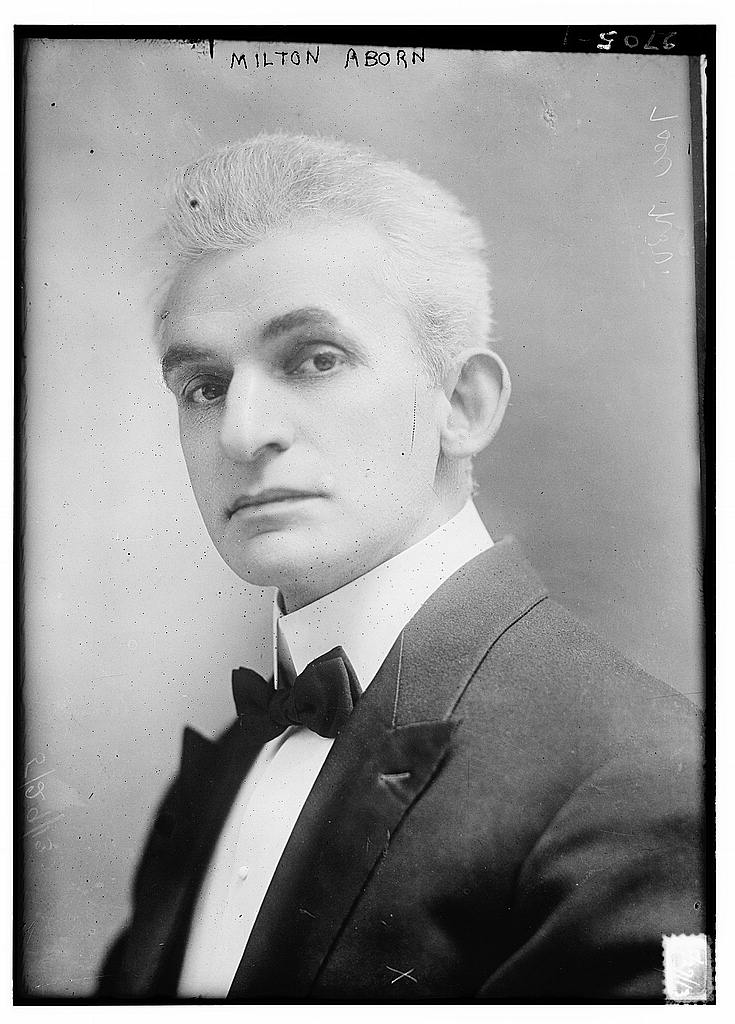
Milton Aborn c1913

The stage director Edward P. Temple was engaged by A. H. Woods to stage a ballet of 100 dancers to accompany the film in America. Temple sailed to London on 12 December 1912 to watch the London presentation of "The Miracle". He and Menchen had worked together before at Thomson & Dundy's New York Hippodrome: e.g. in 1906 the revue A Society Circus, Act III, Scene 3, the 'Court of the Golden Fountains' was stage managed by Temple, with stereopticon machines by Menchen. Temple returned in the New Year to prepare the staging with a B&W copy of the 7,000 feet film, and began rehearsing the chorus (150 adults and 50 children), in the week of 12 January 1913. Al. Woods, who had also watched the Covent Garden production with Temple, had found some business partners to share the financial burden with: Milton and Sargent Aborn. The Aborns were producers of operetta with their Aborn Opera Company. Temple had already staged Balfe's The Bohemian Girl for the Aborns at the Majestic (later Park Theatre) in 1911.

After The Miracle had finished its Covent Garden run and transferred to the newly refurbished Picture House at 165 Oxford Street, London, Woods returned on the RMS Mauretania with the precious colour film on 6 February. An advertisement by Menchen in the UK trade press on 5 February claimed that The Miracle would be shown at the Liberty Theatre, owned by Klaw and Erlanger, although other venues were still being considered, including the 'old' Metropolitan Opera House (Note: New York Dramatic Mirror, 24 July 1912, p. 13. Maurice Grau, general manager of the NY Metropolitan Opera House 1891–1903 was the brother of the impresario Robert Grau, who in 1896 had met and encouraged Menchen who was working as a theatre electrician in Kansas City, Missouri. Robert Grau later became a writer on serious theatre, and his book "The Stage in the 20th century" included a stop-press puff for "The Miracle". Robert Grau's greatest success was to manage Adelina Patti's 1903-4 farewell tour of the US, netting him $200,000.) or the New Amsterdam Theatre (also built by Klaw and Erlanger); but by 14 February the Park Theatre had been booked – there were all kinds of consultations, all kinds of arguments, and at least one assault.

==== US première ====
The New York première performance of the Menchen Miracle in full colour took place at the Park Theater, 5 Columbus Circle (formerly the Majestic), on 17 February 1913. (Note: The Park Theatre had opened in January 1903 as the Majestic with the musical The Wizard of Oz, which ran for ten months. Menchen provided (and possibly designed) the lighting and "jaw-dropping special effects" for the show, which included a ten-minute tornado. Sources: Menchen 1906, p. 10. Krefft, Bryan. "International Theatre". Cinema Treasures.) The presentation was not quite as elaborate as in Covent Garden (a procession of nuns opened the proceedings, but the critics made no mention of the dancers); Humperdinck's music was performed by a chorus of 100 and an augmented Russian Symphony Orchestra of New York conducted by its founder Modest Altschuler. Altschuler was a pupil of Gustav Holländer, who had previously conducted the orchestra in the stage performances of The Miracle at Olympia in London in 1911–12. Holländer was the director of the Berlin Stern Conservatory, where one of the professors was Humperdinck who composed the score used in the stage and film versions of The Miracle. Holländer also composed the music for Reinhardt's 1910 stage production of Vollmoeller's pantomime Sumurûn.

The show apparently ran continuously in New York at the Park Theater until at least 9 March.

Boston

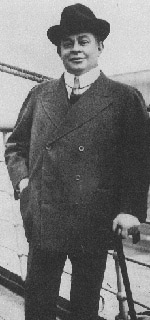
Charles Frohman (manager of the Colonial Theatre, Boston) in 1915

The Miracle showed from 24 February 1913 for two weeks of rather light business at the Colonial Theatre, Boston, MA. The managers at the Colonial were Charles Frohman and William Harris, father of Henry B. Harris, who had taken over the affairs of his late son. The city censor objected to a number of scenes, and several hundred feet had to be cut; tickets cost up to $1.50 (higher than average), and business was very poor. The Miracle was followed by The Pink Lady, one of the previous season's greatest musical successes, with the company fresh from a triumphant run in London.

The weather around Easter-time was atrocious, with tornadoes devastating eight states (see March 1913 tornado outbreak sequence) and killing around 240 people; several further days of heavy rains in the central and eastern United States caused extensive flooding in which further countless hundreds were drowned (estimates vary from 650 to 900); in New York State, Rochester was badly hit, and Buffalo experienced winds of 90 mph (140 km/h).

Rival film banned in Chicago

A film of The Miracle which was banned in Chicago at the end of April 1913 on account of its depiction of "murder, drunkenness and immorality" was probably the Misu version (Das Mirakel), since the states' rights were sold to a Chicago exhibitor by the New York Film Company earlier that month. (Note: "D. Muntuk, of the M and F Feature Film Company, 157 Washington St, Chicago, has secured the Illinois state rights to the New York Film Company's production, The Miracle. He made a special trip to New York to buy the rights for his company." Source: "Brevities of the Business". Motography. IX (7): 256. 5 April 1913.) The police report refers to the film Sister Beatrix as an adaptation of Maeterlinck's play – which usually featured in the NYFC's advertisements, whereas Menchen never referred to it in his publicity – and then confusingly calls it "The Miracle".

==== US litigation ====
The New York Film Company was the US distributor for the Berlin Continental-Kunstfilm production company, whose Das Mirakel had been renamed Sister Beatrix in the UK after a court decision in London. (see above) On 15 January 1913, internal dissensions within the New York Film Company led to Harry Schultz dissolving his partnership with the other two directors and continuing the business alone. However, by 1 February 1913 the situation had been reversed; after differences between the directors had been resolved, Schultz quit the business and Danziger and Levi took control of the New York Film Company.

After the Menchen Miracle had finished showing at Covent Garden (by 31 January 1913 at the latest) the film arrived in the US and received its US première on Monday 17 February 1913, at the Park Theater, New York.

During the week of 3–9 March 1913, Al Woods went to court to prevent the New York Film Co. from continuing to lease their film of The Miracle. Justice Lehman imposed a temporary injunction in Woods' favour on the condition that he paid a bond of $20,000. The New York Film Co. thereafter billed the Continental film as "Sister Beatrice, previously advertised as The Miracle", and re-advertised the 'States Rights' for the film under its new title. Menchen's film showed again in Boston during the week of 5 April 1913, and Woods obtained an injunction to stop the A. A. Kellman Feature Film Co. (Kellman was the proprietor of the Park Theater, Taunton, Mass.) from showing Continental's The Miracle film under its illegal name.

However, the bond of $20,000 was not forthcoming from Woods, so Justice Lehman vacated the injunction on 6 May 1913, leaving the New York Film Co. free to sell or lease The Miracle without question.

=== Netherlands ===
The Miracle opened at the Flora Theatre, 79–81 Wagenstraat, The Hague, on 24 March 1913 and played for 3 consecutive weeks. (Note: This may be a B&W print; a color print of The Miracle had been playing in the New York in February and March 1913 (see above). The distributors of the Continental version regained the legal right to show their version of Das Mirakel from 6 May (see also § US litigation below).) Timed performances were advertised rather than the usual continuous show, possibly to maximise the number of available seats (800 in 1909) It sold out for the first two weeks and played to very full houses in the third week.

The Flora was originally run by F.A. Nöggerath. His son Anton Nöggerath, Jr., followed in his father' business, learning the film trade in Britain at the Warwick Trading Company from 1897 with Charles Urban and forming his own negative developing business in 1903 in Wardour Street, London. When his father died in 1908, Nöggerath returned to the Netherlands and took over the business with his mother. (Note: Blom 2000, p. 401 cites one source which suggests that Noggerath had paid 3 million French francs to Menchen, but Blom (without further explanation) feels that this a gross exaggeration. One possible reason for this very large sum is that the French franc (FF) was re-valued in 1960 at 1/100th of its old value, so 3,000,000 'old' francs equates to 30,000 nouveaux francs. In 1913 both US and French currencies were on the gold standard, when US$ 1 = 1.505g Au and FF 1 = 0.29g Au. This gives a ratio of about 5.18 (new) francs to the dollar, so 30,000 FF was worth about $5,792. Another way to look at value is through wages: in 1910 the average US wage was 22 cents per hour, and the average US worker made between $200 and $400 per year. Adjusted for inflation, $5,792 in 1910 is equivalent to about $138,666 in 2015.) (Note: The building where the Flora theatre was located still exists; the external façade is decorated just below the pediment with typical polychrome ceramic tiles showing Greek masks and musical instruments; the façade is topped with square capitals depicting stylised theatrical masks with merely eyes and eyebrows in Art Deco style. See photo at 79–81 Wagenstraat. Flickr. Accessed 11 February 2016)

The Miracle played for two weeks from 16 May 1913 at the Bioscope Theatre, 34 Reguliersbreestraat, Amsterdam, another Noggerath establishment; at the Thalia Theatre in the Hague for a week from 25 October 1918, and at the Prinses Theater, Rotterdam, for the week starting 25 July 1919.

=== Australia ===
The Australasian rights to "The Miracle" were acquired from Joseph Menchen by Beaumont Smith during his year-long world tour of South Africa, Europe and Canada with his novelty show "Tiny Town" featuring small people. Smith went on to own or manage numerous Australian cinemas, and later directed films himself. In Australia and New Zealand (as in Britain) The Miracle was generally advertised not simply as an ordinary film in its own right, but as a 'Lyricscope play', having been designed as part of a unique evening's entertainment complete with film, sets, actors and dancers, chorus & orchestra.

The Australian première of The Miracle took place in Sydney on 29 December 1913, at T. J. West's Glaciarium, one of Australia's earliest purpose-built ice skating rinks which doubled as a cinema during the summer months. (Note: T. J. West had originally come from England, where he teamed up his Modern Marvel Company with Henry John Hayward's novelty theatre company to form 'West's Picture Company and The Brescians'. After successful theatrical tours of New Zealand and Australia they concentrated on the cinema business, Hayward making his base in Auckland, while West continued to make considerable profits throughout Australia, where he owned 14 permanent cinemas by 1910 with an estimated nightly audience of 20,000.)

The sets for The Miracle were constructed by the scenic artists George Dixon (who had also worked on the original London production) and Harry Whaite. Lewis De Groen (d. 1919 aged 54) conducted a chorus of 80 singers and his augmented Vice-Regal Orchestra. De Groen had been the conductor at T. J. West's Cinematograph (i.e. cinema) since around 1900, and continued his position in West's new Glaciarium when it opened in 1907. In 1908 he was managing some 80 musicians in Australia and New Zealand, and conducting nightly at three different venues in Sydney.

The Miracle ran in Sydney for two weeks and later for three weeks at West's Melbourne cinema during April and May 1914 before transferring to Adelaide, and to Perth in June. It continued to show in Australia, including Wagga Wagga in July 1915 and Warracknabeal in May 1916.

=== New Zealand ===
The film, with Burke's orchestra and a chorus, played "with a degree of excellence" at the King's Theatre, Auckland in March 1914. The performances were staged by Maurice Ralph. The relatively large forces available in the city venues were somewhat reduced in the provinces: according to an advertisement in the Poverty Bay Herald in May 1914 for The Miracle at His Majesty's Theatre, Gisborne, New Zealand: "Humperdinck's glorious music will be rendered by a Grand Augmented Orchestra of 12 instrumentalists."

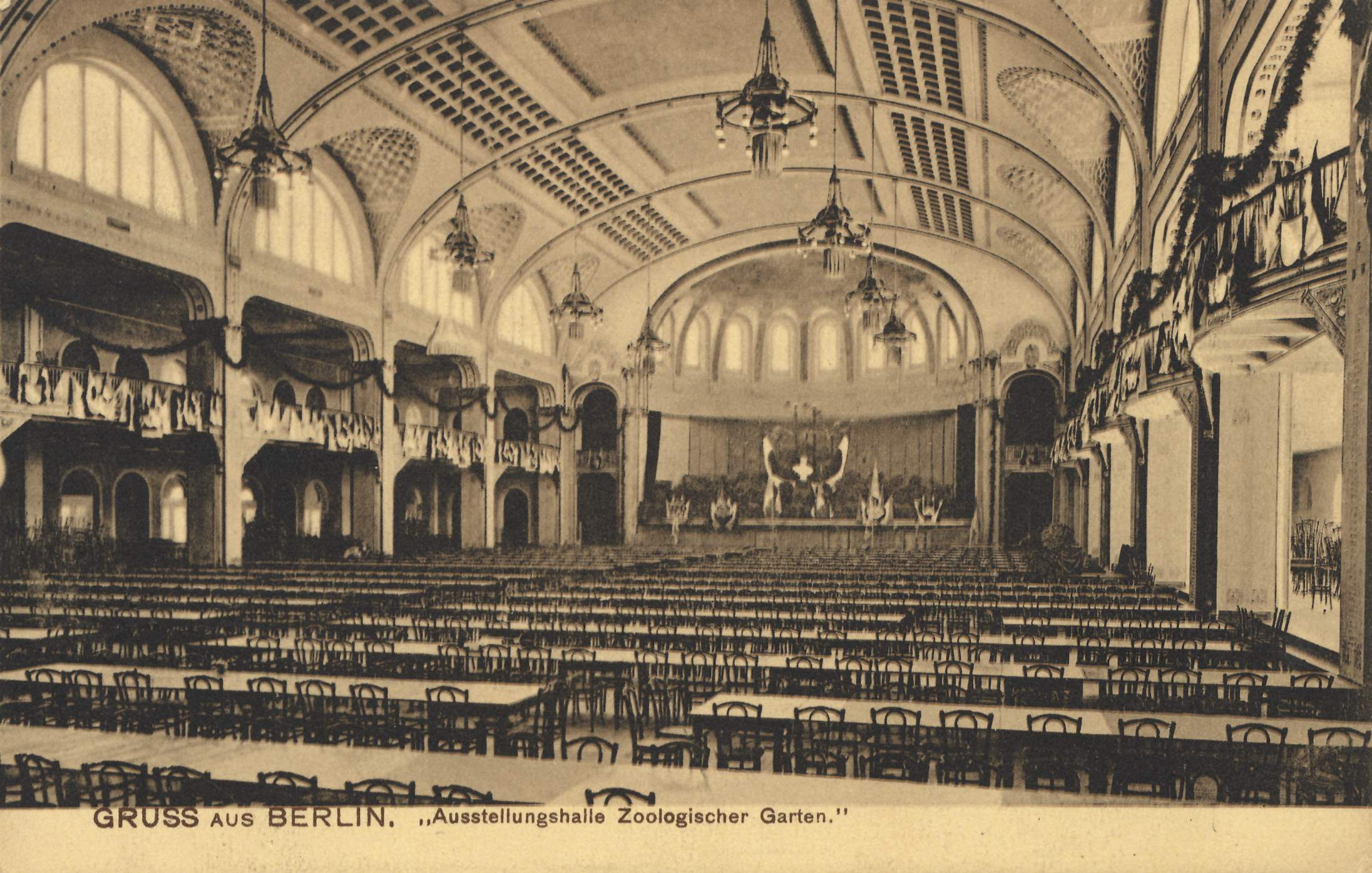
The original exhibition hall at the Zoological Gardens, Charlottenburg in 1908, before its conversion into a theatre and then the Palast am Zoo cinema.

=== Germany ===
After the 1912 run of performances in the Vienna Rotunde (immediately followed by the film shoot), Vollmoeller's stage play continued its European tour until 1914, playing in Berlin for two weeks at the Zirkus Busch from 30 April to 13 May. (Note: List of initial European performances of The Miracle (play) (source: Styan 1982, pp. 136–150): 1912: 15 September – Vienna Rotunde; October – Elberfeld, Breslau, Cologne; 1913: January – Prague; February – Vienna Volksoper; September – Leipzig, Dresden, Elberfeld, Breslau, Cologne, Prague; 23 December – Festhalle Frankfurt am Main; 1914: January – Hamburg, Karlsruhe; 30 April – Circus/Zirkus Busch, Berlin.) Two days later the film of The Miracle received its German première (as Das Mirakel) at the Palast am Zoo cinema (later Ufa-Palast am Zoo), Charlottenburg, Berlin on Monday, 15 May 1914. (Note: This late date may point to some sort of agreement between Reinhardt and Menchen that the film of The Miracle wasn't to be released until the run of staged productions had ended.)

The exclusive lease on the Palast am Zoo was owned by the millionaire swindler Frank J. Goldsoll. A few months previously he had bought out the European interests of his business partner, A. H. Woods, along with the German film rights to The Miracle. Goldsoll and Woods had previously built the Ufa-Pavillon am Nollendorfplatz, Berlin's first purpose-built, free-standing cinema, in 1913. They both joined Goldwyn Pictures Corporation in 1919. Godsoll, as a major investor, ousted Sam Goldwyn to become the company's president until its merger to form MGM in 1924.

== Reception ==
The 18 year-old Paul Hindemith went to see Reinhardt's original stage production when it arrived on tour in Frankfurt am Main in December 1913. In a letter he clearly conveys the almost overwhelming effect of the massive, pageant-like show in the Festhalle. It seems (from Hindemith's description of the "real thing") that Menchen had largely succeeded in recreating a similar atmosphere in his full-colour 'Lyricscope' screenings of the film:

28 December 1913

Yesterday I went to a performance of Vollmoeller's "Miracle", which Max Reinhardt is presenting in the Festhalle. If you ever get a chance to see it, do not miss it! You can hardly believe it is possible to keep control of such immense masses of players. I was completely bowled over and would never have believed that it was possible that anything so brilliant and grandiose could be done on a stage, or rather in an arena. The whole gigantic Festhalle has been transformed into a colossal church. All the lamps have become church lanterns and all the windows, church windows. Church bells ring out at the start, and the whole hall becomes black as night. Then the sound of the organ, and nuns singing. Stupendous lighting effects, a procession lasting 3/4 of an hour, wonderful music, and a rich display of people, costumes, and scenery! And how well the actors act! I came out of the hall reeling, and only this morning returned to my senses. It sweeps you right off your feet, and you forget you are in the theatre. I shall go again, come what may, even if I have to pay 20 marks for it. (Note: This was nearly a week's wages for an industrial worker in Germany in 1913, when 20 marks was worth about £1 or $5.) On 1 January we are having Parsifal here. I'll see if I can find a sympathetic soul to buy me a ticket. (Note: At the time he went to see The Miracle, Hindemith was the leader of the orchestra of the Neues Theater, Frankfurt, where Walter Kollo's Posse mit Gesang – 'farce with singing' Filmzauber (a parody on the current craze for silent films) was running. A lost dramatic piece by Hindemith entitled Die Tragödie im Kino also dates from this period. (See Luttmann 2013.) His letter describes Filmzauber (which he had already played 17 times and was about be sick of) as "utter nonsense from beginning to end, yet funny and charming[...] We play the whole thing by heart and prick up our ears only when a new joke is cracked above our heads." Hindemith picks out Kind, ich schlafe so schlecht on YouTube (rec. 1912) (Baby, I slept so bad) and Unter'n Linden on YouTube as "numbers of truly classical beauty". (Source: Skelton 1995, p. 6). The contrast with The Miracle can be heard below in a clip which combines a 1932 recording of extracts from Humperdinck's score with the final scene from Menchen's film. Wagner's Bayreuth Festspielhaus was previously the only place where Parsifal was allowed to be staged, although a number of concert performances had been given outside Bayreuth: the ban was lifted from 1 January 1913.)

The New York American voiced the fears of the Royal Opera House's traditional upper-class opera-goers: "The movies have invaded that sedate institution and stronghold of classic music, the Covent Garden Theatre. [...] It is true that the fashionable opera season does not begin until May, but the idea obtains among the conservative patrons of the house that the new departure comes shiveringly near being a desecration."

In London, however, the normally conservative Athenaeum waxed almost lyrical about the new film:

The producers of 'The Miracle', adapted as a Lyricscope play in colours, at Covent Garden, have furnished us with another instance of the satisfactory use to which the comparatively new invention has recently been put. Those who were unfortunate enough not to see the representation at Olympia may now get an excellent conception of that wonderful production[...] After being afflicted so often by the gesticulations of animated bifurcated radishes, it is indeed a pleasure to view the grace of real actors and actresses. The timing of the chorus with the pictorial representation is capable of amendment. Full justice is done by the orchestra to Prof. Humperdinck's music.

Stephen W. Bush, reviewing "Reinhardt's Miracle" in The Moving Picture World after its US première, had some observant criticisms among the plaudits:

When the Nun danced before the Robber Baron the voices behind the screen sounded more like an animated quarrel in an East Side saloon than the rumblings of a licentious mob. Numerous other defects could be pointed out such as the wearing of high heels by one of the leading and sacred characters of the piece, the persistence with which the knight wore his full armor even while courting the sister, the all-too sudden death of the robber baron; but these defects disappear in the splendor and magnificence of the whole.

Rev. E. A. Horton, chaplain of the Massachusetts Senate, said:"'The Miracle' held my constant attention and gave me great reward in suggestion and pleasure."

In Australia, The Sydney Morning Herald commented: "Max Reinhardt's stupendous production of the 'Miracle' was screened for the last time at West's Glaciarium on Saturday night before an enormous house. The season has marked an era in the history of cinematography in this country and the success of the production will not easily be forgotten."

In Germany, The Miracle received a resoundingly positive review from Lichtbild-Bühne, entitled "Bravo Goldsoll!" (Frank Goldsoll was the owner of the Palast am Zoo cinema where it showed).

We have slept for years! The theater novice Goldsoll, the Variété expert, comes to us and has to show us how it's done... [He] leaves the theatre air pregnant with incense, so that mood is created. He makes great music with bells and orchestrations etc.. He leaves a plastic, wonderful scenery as a dramatic frame for the film show. He applies lighting effects: at the beginning and end, living nuns and choristers, etc. come on stage and are presented the bodily dedicated mother of God center stage. The effect of the film "The Miracle" is thus so colossal that day the theatre the film is sold out through full presentation has increased in value so great that even enthusiasts say that the whole thing looks more like the original.

The business is launched so brilliantly that the whole guild of theater practitioners who now complain about their empty houses, should simply be ashamed.

Go and try to capitalize on the consequences of this "Miracle" demonstration. Rub the sleep from your eyes, and call out with envy: "Bravo, Goldsoll.

== Which Miracle? ==
Name changes for Miracle films of 1912
Company	Country		Title	Notes
Joseph Menchen	UK	only	The Miracle	fp 21 December 1912
Joseph Menchen	USA	only	The Miracle	fp 17 February 1913
Joseph Menchen	Germany	only	Das Mirakel	fp 15 May 1914
Continental-Kunstfilm	Germany	original	Das Mirakel	Banned (verbot) in Germany 19 October 1912. Registered as a film, (Prüfung) December 1912.
Continental-Kunstfilm	Germany	later	Das Marienwunder: eine alte legende	Re-classified as Over 18 only (jugendverbot) by the police censor and released with cuts in May 1914
Continental-Kunstfilm	UK	pre-release	The Miracle	Never released under this title following Menchen's court injunction
Continental-Kunstfilm	UK	release	Sister Beatrix. A Miracle Play	(after 17 December 1912)
Continental-Kunstfilm	USA	original	The Miracle: a legend of medieval times	Press screening 18 October 1912, fp 15 December 1912
Continental-Kunstfilm	USA	temporary	The Miracle of Sister Beatrice, OR; The Miracle, or Sister Beatrice	(March–May 1913)

== Recordings of Humperdinck's music ==
A double-sided 78 rpm recording of selections from The Miracle (C2429, matrix nos. 2B 3406 & 2B 3407) was issued by His Master's Voice on a plum-coloured label in 1932, featuring the London Symphony Orchestra, organ and an unnamed chorus, conducted by Einar Nilson.

The recording coincided with the 1932 run of the stage revival of The Miracle at Lyceum Theatre, London, with Lady Diana Cooper & Wendy Toye, choreography by Leonide Massine and produced again by C.B. Cochran. Nilsson had previously conducted the orchestra in Reinhardt's new 1924 stage production (with Morris Gest) of The Miracle, set designed by Norman Bel Geddes at the Century Theatre, in New York.

Side 2 of the above 1932 recording can be heard as the unsynchronised soundtrack to a YouTube clip of the final scene of the film. This is a tinted B&W print, not the original coloured film. The four short selections are as follows, cue numbers taken from the vocal score (see Musical scores):

- Entracte (Part II), cue 1: Leicht bewegt (pdf p. 47)
- Entracte, cue 11: Fackeltanz der Nonne (pdf p. 65)
- Act II, scene 1, cue 1 6/8 (pdf p. 80)
- Act II, final scene, cue 39 (pdf p. 104)

Humperdinck also made arrangements of various numbers for military band. These were recorded by the band of the Coldstream Guards conducted by Major Mackenzie Rogan and released on single-sided His Master's Voice 78 rpm discs in March 1913.

== See also ==
- List of early color feature films
- List of Christian films
- Ufa-Pavillon am Nollendorfplatz, a Berlin cinema built in 1913 by Al. Woods and Joe Goldsoll
