= Wague =

Wague is a surname. Notable people with the surname include:

- Georges Wague (1874–1965), French mime, teacher, and actor
- Ismaël Wagué, Malian military officer
- Mamadou Wague (born 1990), French footballer
- Molla Wague (born 1991), Malian footballer
- Moussa Wagué (born 1998), Senegalese footballer
