= Frederick Hitch =

Recipient of the Victoria Cross (1856–1913)

Frederick Hitch VC
- Born: 27 November 1856; Southgate, Middlesex
- Died: 6 January 1913 (aged 56); Chiswick, Middlesex
- Burial place: St. Nicholas' Churchyard, Old Chiswick; 51°29′03.06″N 0°15′10.9″W
- Military career
- Allegiance: United Kingdom/British Empire
- Branch: British Army
- Service years: 7 March 1877 – August 1879
- Rank: Private
- Unit: 24th Regiment of Foot
- Conflicts: Anglo-Zulu War - Rorke's Drift
- Awards: Victoria Cross; South Africa Medal
- Other work: London cab driver

Frederick Hitch, VC (29 November 1856 – 6 January 1913) was an English recipient of the Victoria Cross for his actions at the Battle of Rorke's Drift, the highest award for gallantry in the face of the enemy that can be awarded to British and Commonwealth forces.

== Early life ==
Born in Southgate, in Middlesex, he joined the British Army and served as a private in the 2nd Battalion, 24th Regiment of Foot (later The South Wales Borderers). During the Anglo-Zulu War, aged 22, he fought at the Battle of Rorke's Drift (22–23 January 1879), and was awarded the VC for his actions. The citation was published in the London Gazette:

War Office, May 2, 1879.

THE Queen has been graciously pleased to signify Her intention to confer the decoration of the Victoria Cross on the undermentioned Officers and Soldiers of Her Majesty's Army, whose claims have been submitted for Her Majesty's approval, for their gallant conduct in the defence of Rorke's Drift, on the occasion of the attack by the Zulus, as recorded against their names, viz.:—
2nd Battalion 24th Regiment Corporal William Allen and Private Frederick Hitch

It was chiefly due to the courageous conduct of these men that communication with the hospital was kept up at all. Holding together at all costs a most dangerous post, raked in reverse by the enemy's fire from the hill, they were both severely wounded, but their determined conduct enabled the patients to be withdrawn from the hospital, and when incapacitated by their wounds from fighting, they continued, as soon as their wounds had been dressed, to serve out ammunition to their comrades during the night.

The soldiers were assisted in passing out ammunition by Padre George Smith. Hitch was severely wounded during the action, and was still in the Royal Victoria Military Hospital, Netley, Southampton when he received his medal from Queen Victoria. He was one of the eleven recipients of the VC awarded for their part in the battle.

== Later life ==
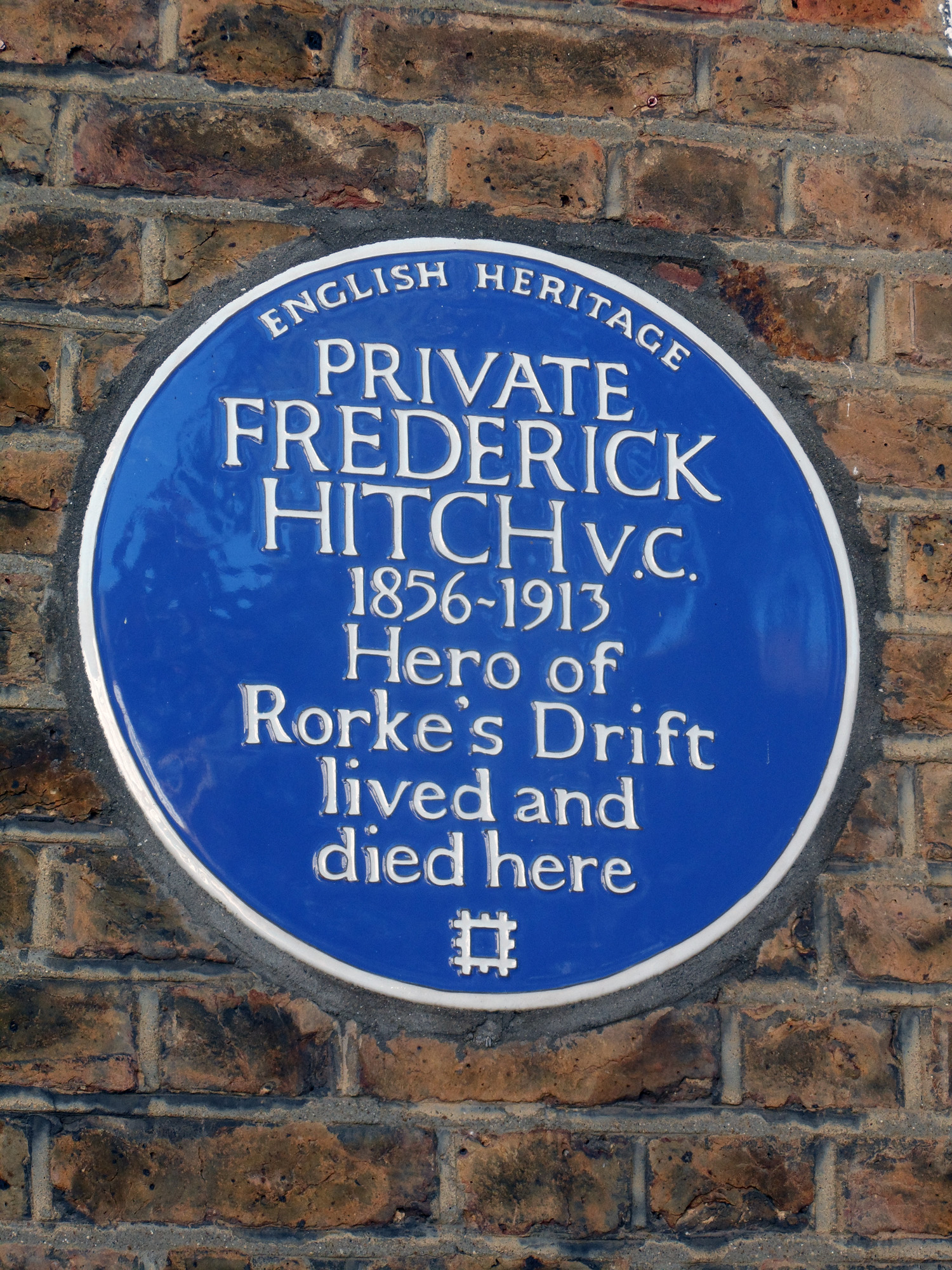
Blue Plaque marking the home of Private Frederick Hitch V.C. at 62 Cranbrook Road, Chiswick, London.

Hitch's wounds were so severe that they led to his discharge from service on 25 August 1879, having served 2 years and 6 months. (Note: 'Name and present rank: Hitch, Private Frederick (discharged on pension); Rank as gazetted: Private; Regiment as gazetted: 2 Bn. 24 Ft.; Campaign: Zululand; date of Notification: 2 May 1879') He then moved from job to job, unable to perform manual work due to the damage to his arm he had received during the battle. He married in 1883, but reportedly found life difficult living on his disability pension from the government, which amounted to just £10 a year. In 1901, whilst climbing a ladder he suffered a fall. When he awoke in hospital his VC, which he always wore, had been stolen. Another version is that he was given a position in Whitehall as a ceremonial guard and his VC was cut off his chest and he was knocked to the ground. In this version his VC was replaced by the regiment. His missing VC later reappeared at auction and was bought by Hitch's descendants for £85. Both the original and the replacement are in the regimental museum.

Forced to pay for a new one from his own pocket, Hitch also lost his job soon afterwards when he was accused of faking the fall to hide the fact that he had sold his medal to raise funds. This has never been proven. Hitch had eight children, and managed to land a steady job as driver of a smart horse-drawn cab (pulled by his own pair of horses), which he later exchanged for a motor taxi cab. This provided him with a comfortable income for some years.

By the time of his death in 1913, Hitch was living alone in Chiswick, West London at 62 Cranbrook Road where he is commemorated with a blue plaque from English Heritage. He collapsed and died at his home whilst talking to a neighbour. He was buried in St Nicholas' churchyard in Chiswick, with full military honours. His funeral was attended by a large number of London 'cabbies' and he is commemorated by the Fred Hitch Gallantry Award for cab drivers.

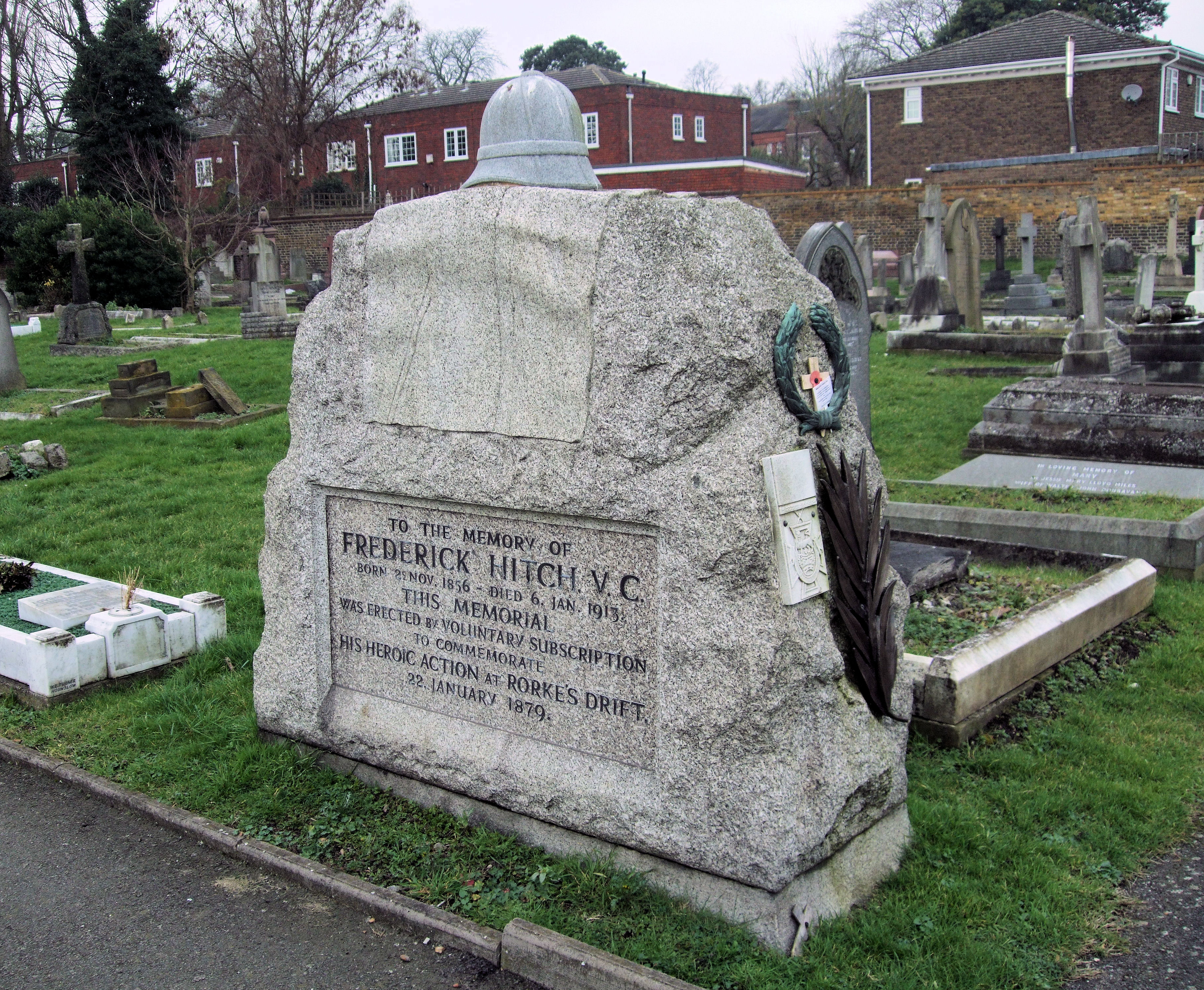

He is buried in the centre of the churchyard of St Nicholas Church, Chiswick. The grave is difficult to miss since it is more of a monument than a grave, featuring a helmet on top. The memorial was paid for by subscriptions to a well-supported fund established shortly after Hitch's death by Chiswick's Urban District Council. Notable subscribers included leading Chiswick figures, Mayors of the London Boroughs of Hammersmith, of Kensington, and of Poplar, four MPs and the wealthy banker Leopold de Rothschild. Additional funds came from a donation by the American producer, Joseph Menchen, of the proceeds of a screening of the world's first all-colour feature film. Menschen opened London's newly built Picture House cinema, at 166 Oxford Street, with The Miracle and gave the takings of its first matinee to Hitch's memorial fund. (Note: The film was just about to be transferred from the Royal Opera House, Covent Garden, where the general public paid as little as sixpence (2½p) for seats normally occupied by the upper classes at much higher prices to watch themselves while opera was being performed.) (Note: The Picture House later became the art-house Academy Cinema.)

== Legacy ==
His Victoria Cross is displayed at the Regimental Museum of The Royal Welsh, Brecon, Powys, Wales.

Hitch was portrayed by David Kernan in the 1964 film Zulu.
