= L'Enfant prodigue (1907 film) =

- Directed by: Michel Carré
- Written by: Michel Carré
- Starring: Georges Wague; Henri Gouget
- Distributed by: Pathé Frères
- Release dates: 20 June 1907 (France); 12 October 1907 (U.S.)
- Running time: 90 minutes
- Country: France

L'Enfant prodigue (French pronunciation: [lɑ̃.fɑ̃ pʁɔ.diɡ], French for "The Prodigal Son") was the first feature-length motion picture produced in Europe, running 90 minutes. Directed by Michel Carré, from his three-act stage pantomime, The Prodigal Son. The film was an unmodified filmed record of his play. Filmed at the Gaumont company studios in May 1907.

The film premiered at the Théâtre des Variétés on the Boulevard Montmartre, in Paris, on 20 June 1907.

Carré directed another film version of L'Enfant prodigue in 1916.

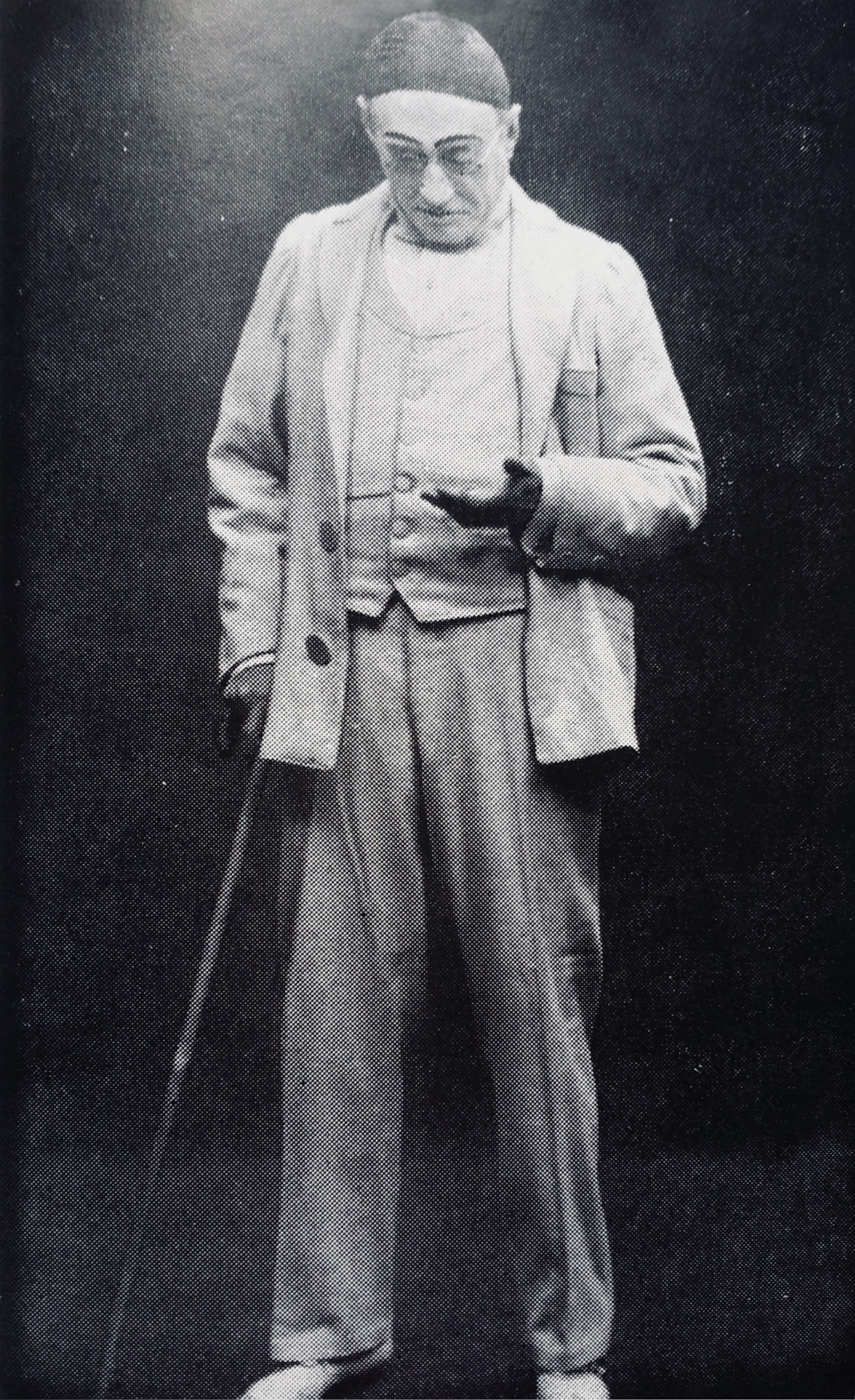
Studio photograph of Georges Wague as Pere Pierrot in L'Enfant prodigue

== Cast (in credits order) ==
- Georges Wague
- Henri Gouget
- Christiane Mandelys
- Gilberte Sergy
