= Christiane Mandelys =

French silent film actress (1873–1957)

Clotilde Louise Georgette Marigaux (1873–1957) was a French actress, mime, and film critic of the silent film era. She appeared in many early French films, including L'Enfant prodigue (1907), the first feature-length film to be produced in Europe. Mandelys was married to fellow actor Georges Wague and was a frequent collaborator of director Louis Feuillade.

== Early life ==
Mandelys was born in Paris, France on 3 December 1873. During the late 1890's, she studied the art of pantomime under Félicia Mallet at the Paris Conservatoire. During this time, Mandelys met Georges Wagues, who was also studying mime. The two eventually married and performed together at the Exposition Universelle (1900).

== Career ==
Mandelys appeared in numerous films between 1907 and 1910. During this time, she frequently collaborated with director Louise Feuillade and acted alongside Renée Carl, Alice Tissot, Maurice Vinot, and Jeanne Marie-Laurent, among others. She is also credited as a screenwriter on three films: La Légende de la fileuse (1908), L'Étoile filante (1909), and La Fil de la vierge (1910).

She died in Paris on 18 May 1957.

=== Filmography ===
Title	Director	Year	Citation
L'Enfant prodigue	Michel-Antoine Carré	1907	
La sirène	Louise Feuillade	1907	
Le Retour du croisé	Louise Feuillade	1908	
La Guitare enchantée	Louise Feuillade	1908	
Serments de fiançailles	Louise Feuillade	1908	
Le Remords	Louise Feuillade	1908	
Le huguenot	Louise Feuillade	1909	
La Possession de l'enfant	Louis Feullade	1909	
Le Printemps	Louis Feuillade	1909	
La Cigale et la Fourmi	Louis Feuillade	1909	
Idylle corinthienne	Louis Feuillade	1909	
Don Quichotte	Émile Cohl	1909	
Le Collier de la reine	Louise Feuillade, Etienne Arnaud	1911	
