= Louis Huvey =

French painter

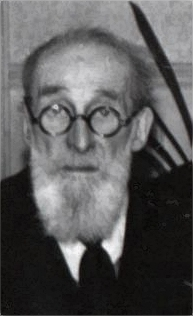
- 1954 photograph of Huvey
- Born: 1 June 1868; Saint-Étienne, Loire
- Died: 4 March 1954 (aged 85)
- Occupations: painter, printmaker and poster artist

Louis Huvey (4 June 1868 – 4 March 1954) was a French painter, printmaker and poster artist.

== Life ==
François Louis Huvey was born in Saint-Étienne, Loire. His parents were Joseph Huvey, merchant, and Marie Antoinette Gerin-Roze, who collected incomes from properties she owned. At the age of 17 he became a student at the École nationale des beaux-arts de Lyon in 1885, then he followed the courses of Poncet and Jean-Léon Gérôme in Paris, where he lived until the end of his life. He obtained an honorable mention in 1892 for painting. For engraving he received an honorable mention in the Exposition Universelle (1900), third-class medal in 1901, and second class in 1902.

Louis Huvey had several talents: he was a painter, engraver, a poster artist and a musician. In 1899 he composed the music for a pantomime play called Sommeil Blanc (White Sleep), written by Xavier Privas. It was played at the Théâtre de la Bodinière by Georges Wague and Blanche Cavelli. Through this collaboration, Huvey met the woman of his life, Eugenie Chevallier. Under the stage name of Blanche Cavelli she was the mime interpreter of Coucher d’Yvette (Sleep of Yvette), which she performed in a suggestive half-dressed state. As a solo mime artist, Blanche Cavelli played at the Divan Japonais in the rue des Martyrs, Paris, on 31 March 1894. Huvey formalized his common-law arrangement with Eugenie Chevallier by marrying her on 16 May 1905 at the City Hall of the 18th arrondissement of Paris, where they lived at 15 rue Hégésippe-Moreau.

Eugenie had a five-year-old girl she had named Yvette after her first success. Her daughter, raised in an artistic circle, became a pupil of Cortot at the conservatory at the age of 22, and was pianist for Georges Wague when he became a professor at the Conservatoire de Musique et de Déclamation in 1916 and gave a course of poise and mime.

Before 1938 Huvery was an honorary professor of the École nationale supérieure des Beaux-Arts in the lithography workshop. Louis Huvey died on 4 March 1954, attended by Yvette, whom he adopted in 1954.

== Gallery ==
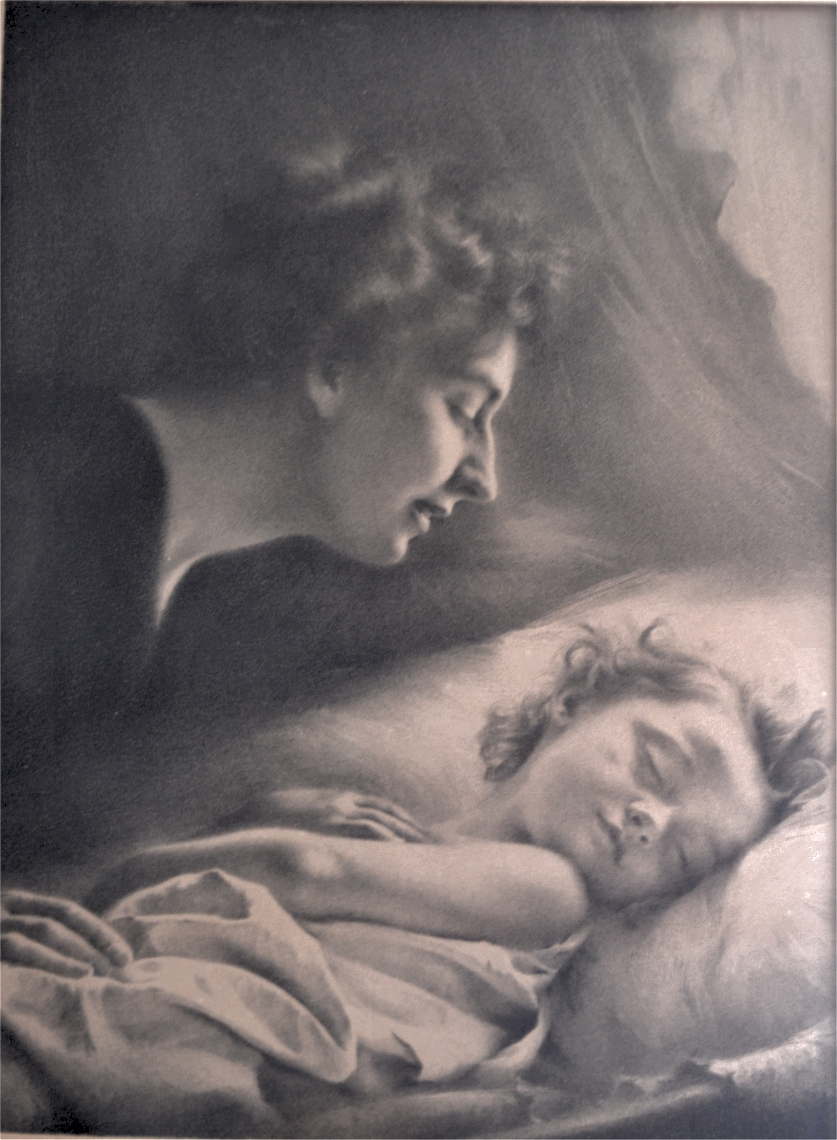
1908 Le Sommeil de l'enfant. Family collection

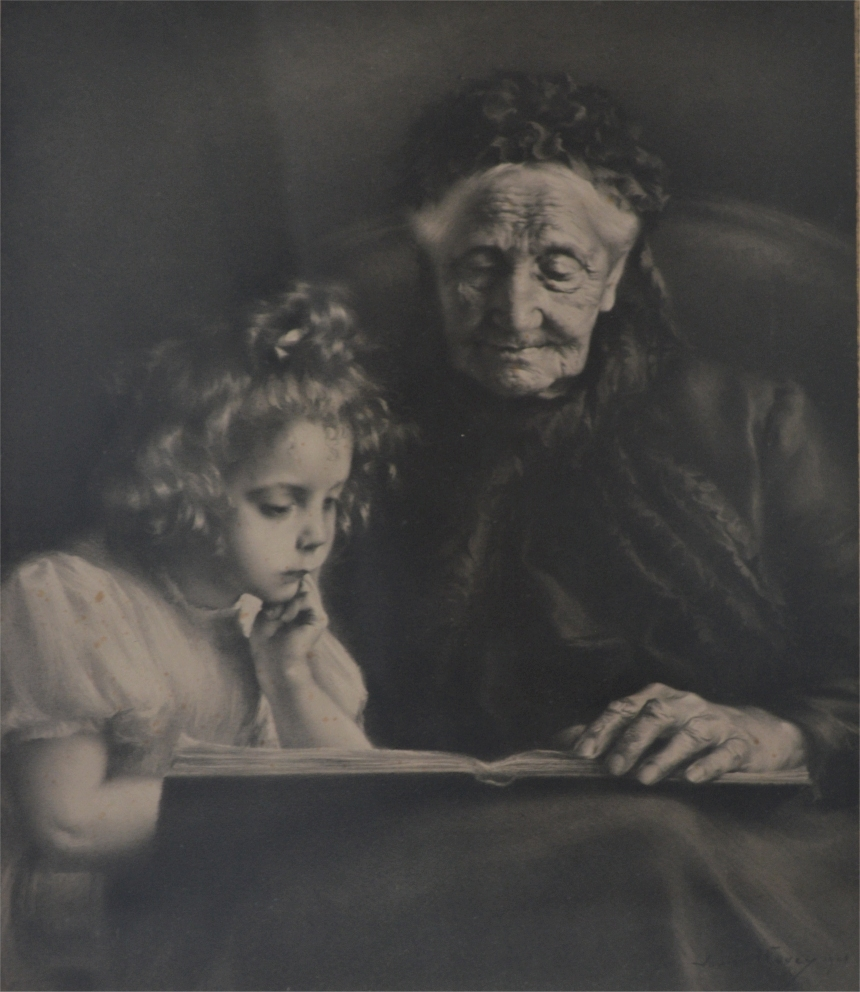
Reading lesson, 1908
