= Secret trust =

A secret trust is a trust which arises when property is left to a person (the legatee) under a will on the understanding that they will hold the property as trustee for the benefit of beneficiaries who are not named in the will.

Secret trusts are divided into two types:

- Fully secret trusts, where the will is totally silent as to the existence of a trust; and
- Semi secret trusts or half secret trusts, where the will provides that the legatee is to hold the property on trusts, but does not specify the terms of the trust or the beneficiary.

Secret trusts are something of a historical anachronism. They arose because in most common law jurisdictions, wills are public documents after they have been admitted to probate, and where the testator wishes to leave a legacy to (for example) a mistress or an illegitimate child without causing pain or embarrassment to his family, he could devise the property to a trusted person to avoid the name of the mistress or illegitimate child appearing in the will. They fall outside of the Wills Act.

Despite their rarity, secret trusts still remain a staple of many law courses at university level, as they represent a rare exception to the rule that any disposition on death must be by way of a will (or a document incorporated by reference into a will) which complies with the applicable statutory requirements in the relevant jurisdiction. Historically, the courts have felt it more important to uphold the rights of the putative beneficiary and to avoid the unjust enrichment of the legatee than to uphold the general rule of public policy that property must devolve by will on death.

The All-Woman Supreme Court in Texas was convened to deal with the results of a secret trust.

== See also ==
- Secret trusts in English law
