= Joseph Menchen =

American film producer

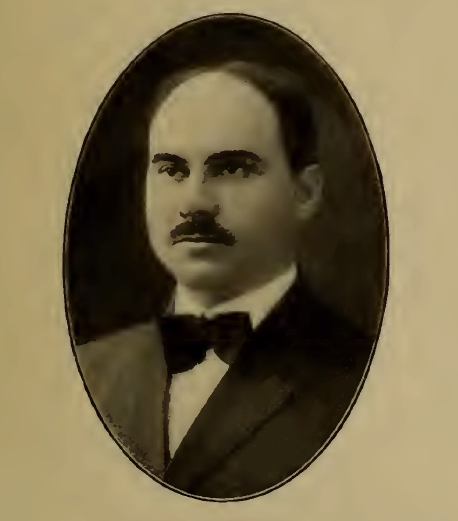
Joseph Menchen c. 1913.

Joseph L. Menchen (1 April 1878 − 4 October 1940) was an American inventor, self-made businessman, film producer, screenwriter and literary agent.

Menchen was born on 1 April 1878 in Illinois.

In 1895, Menchen was a theatre electrician in Kansas City, Missouri. He was the owner of Joseph Menchen Electrical Co., New York, which sold electrical theatre lighting and stage effects.

Menchen produced and co-directed (with Michel Carré) The Miracle (1912 film), an early full-length, hand-coloured, black-and-white British feature film. In 1915, he was involved with the design of the Norris-Menchen flamethrower. He also owned the original film rights to the Arsène Lupin detective novels by Maurice Leblanc, which he sold to Robertson-Cole for $360,000 in 1920.

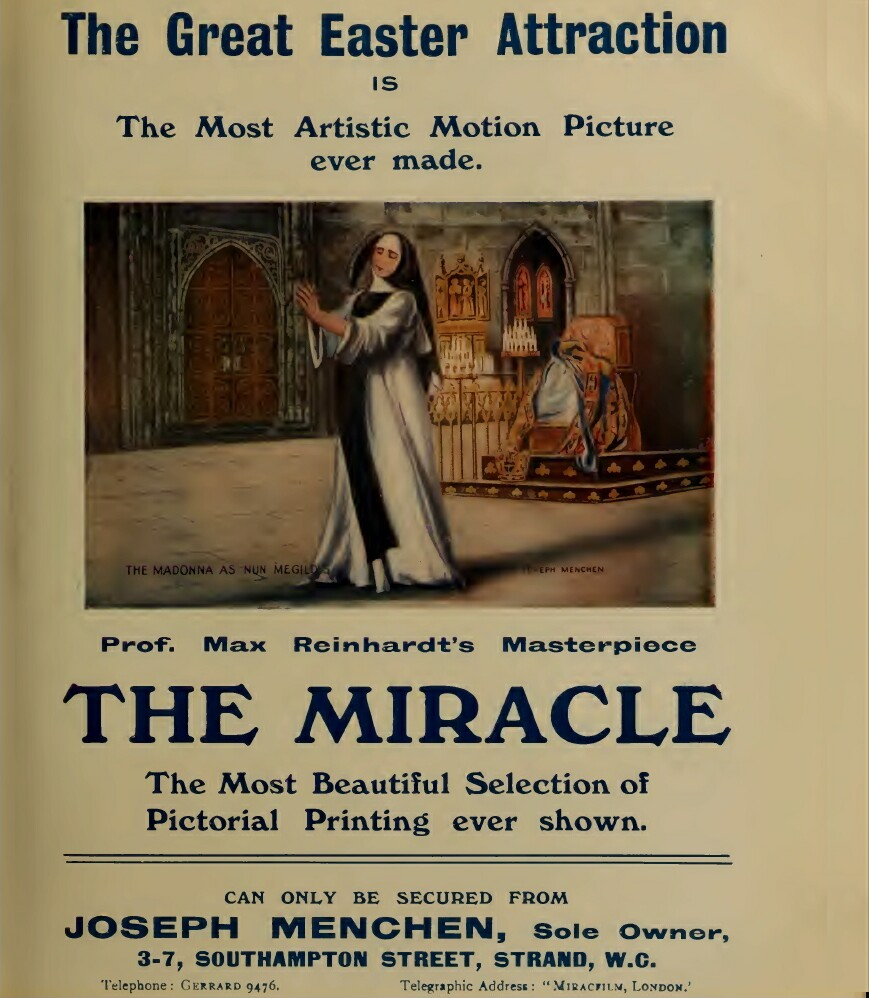
Publicity material for the 1912 film The Miracle

Menchen died on 4 October 1940, aged 62, in California and was buried in Glendale.
