= Xavier Privas =

French singer and poet (1863–1927)

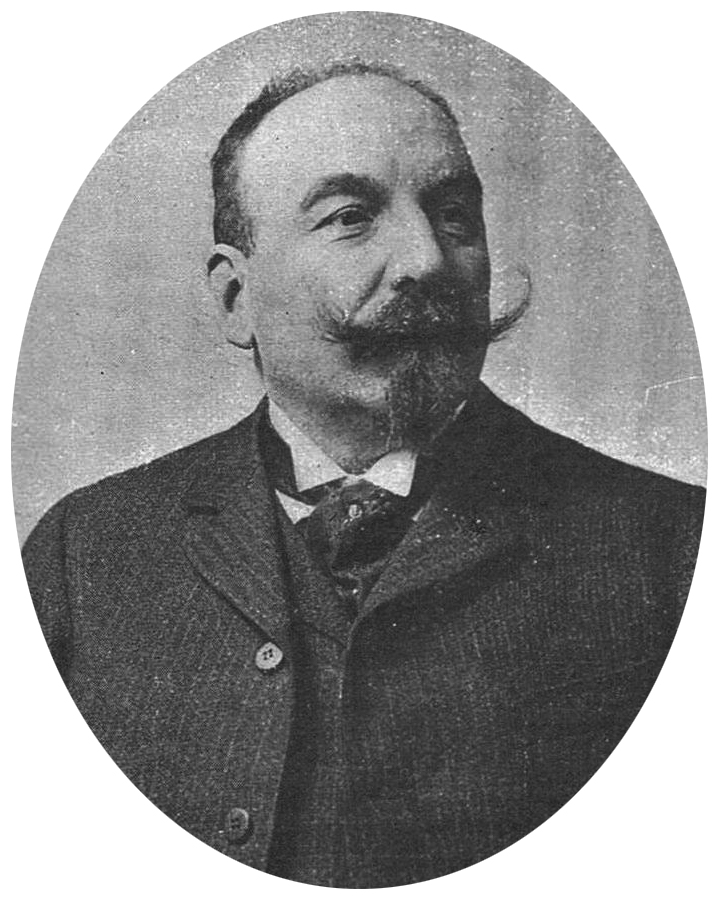
- Xavier Privas in 1904
- Born: 27 September 1863; Lyon, France
- Died: 6 February 1927 (aged 63); Paris, France
- Occupations: Singer, poet and composer

Antoine Paul Taravel, known as Xavier Privas (27 September 1863 – 6 February 1927) was a French singer, poet, goguettier and composer.

== Life ==
Antoine Paul Taravel was born in Lyon on 27 September 1863. He made his debut in the goguette of the Caveau Lyonnais in 1888, where he obtained great success. He was named "prince of songwriters" in 1899. He was a member of the Paris goguette of Le Cornet. He died in Paris on 6 February 1927.

Since 1929 there has been a rue Xavier Privas the 5th arrondissement of Paris and in the 8th arrondissement of Lyon.

== Songbooks ==
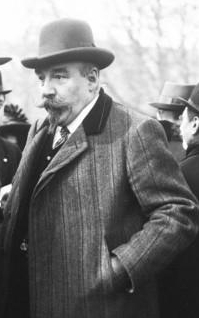
Xavier Privas in 1913

- Chansons chimériques, Paris, P. Ollendorff, 1897 Texte en ligne sur Gallica
- Sommeil blanc, pantomime en 1 acte, argument de Xavier Privas, musique de Louis Huvey, Paris, Imprimerie E. Marcilly, 1899
- Chansons vécues, Paris, P. Ollendorff, 1903 Texte en ligne sur Gallica
- L'Amour chante, Paris, P. Ollendorff, 1904
- Chansons des enfants du peuple, poésies et musique de Xavier Privas, Paris, J. Rueff, 1905
- La Chanson sentimentale, Paris, Librairie L. Vanier, 1906 Texte en ligne sur Gallica
- La Chanson des heures, poésie et musique, Paris, La Librairie mondiale, 1907 Texte en ligne sur Gallica
- Chansons enfantines, 15 chansons et rondes, avec jeux sur les rondes, avec Francine Lorée-Privas, Paris, Dorbon aîné, 1913
- La Douce chanson, 50 chansons, poésie et musique, avec Francine Lorée-Privas, Paris, Dorbon aîné, 1913
- Chansons françaises, poésie et musique, avec Francine Lorée-Privas, Paris, E. Figuière, 1919
- Au pays des fées, avec Francine Lorée-Privas, Paris, Delagrave, 5 fasc., 1922
- Trente ans de chansons, Paris, E. Figuière, 2 vol., 1927-1932
- La Chanson de Lyon, Lyon, P. Masson, 1928

== Recordings ==
Title	Disk	Date
La Ronde des heures	APGA 1411	December 1906
Chanson des chimères	APGA 1412	December 1906
Le Vrai devoir	APGA 1413	December 1906
La Vraie bonté	APGA 1414	December 1906
Le Travail	APGA 1415	December 1906
Grand'-mères	APGA 1416	December 1906
Chanson douloureuse	APGA 1417	December 1906
Le Testament de Pierrot	APGA 1419	December 1906
Le Coffret	APGA 1420	December 1906
La Chanson des heures	APGA 1421	December 1906
Chanson d'adieu	APGA 1423	December 1906
La Chanson sentimentale	APGA 1424	December 1906
Promenade en mer	APGA 1425	December 1906
Les Remords	APGA 1427	December 1906
Thuriféraires	APGA 1428	December 1906
Coucher de soleil	APGA 1429	December 1906
Nini, c'est fini	APGA 1430	December 1906
Les Ruines	APGA 2094	March 1909
La Vraie justice	APGA 2095	March 1909
Berceuse des hirondelles	APGA 2115	1909
Les Marionnettes	APGA 2116	1909
Berceuse du clair de lune	APGA 2117	1909
Conseils à Toto	APGA 2118	1909
Noël pour tous	APGA 2119	1909
La Révolte	APGA 2120	1906
