= Michel-Antoine Carré =

French film director

Michel-Antoine Carré or Michel Carré (fils) (7 February 1865, Paris – 11 August 1945, Paris) was a French actor, stage and film director, and writer of opera librettos, stage plays and film scripts.

== Career ==
He was the son of the librettist Michel Carré (père) (1821–1872) and cousin of the theatre director Albert Carré (his father's nephew). His libretto for André Messager's 1894 opera Mirette was never performed in France but was performed in an English adaptation in London at the Savoy Theatre.

He directed or co-directed some fifty silent films from c1907 to the mid 1920s. Many of these were shorts, including Ordre du roy (1909). His longer notable films included L'Enfant prodigue, the first European-made full-length feature film (1907), based on his own stage pantomime of the same name; and The Miracle (1912), the world's first full-colour narrative feature film.

He was one of the main directors at the Société cinématographique des auteurs et gens de lettres (SCAGL), created to protect the rights of authors whose works were used in screenplays.

He was created chevalier of the French Legion of Honour in 1927

== Works ==
Operas with libretti by Michel-Antoine Carré
Year	Title	Composer	Collaborator	Notes
1888	Friquette et Blaisot	Albert Millet	Charles Narrey	Opera
1890	Hilda	Albert Millet	Charles Narrey	Opera
1893	Le bouton d'or	Gabriel Pierné		'Fantaisie lyrique' in four acts
1894	Mirette	André Messager		Comic opera. Never performed in French. Translated twice for English productions at the Savoy Theatre: dialogue translated by Harry Greenbank, and a new libretto by Fred. E. Weatherly; and later revised with new lyrics by Adrian Ross
1894	Dinah	Edmond Missa	Paul de Choudens	
1897	L'hôte	Edmond Missa	Paul Hugonnet	
1903	Muguette	Edmond Missa	Georges Hartmann	
1922	Le fakir de Bénarès	Léo Manuel		
1933	Le garçon de chez Prunier	Joseph Szulc	André Barde	Three-act operetta

Stage works by Michel-Antoine Carré
Year	Title	Collaborator	Notes
1890	L'enfant prodigue	Music by André Wormser	Silent drama (French pantomime) with music, filmed twice by Carré in 1907 & 1916
1894	Nos bons chasseurs	Paul Bilhaud, music by Charles Lecocq	French vaudeville (stage comedy with vaudeville songs) in three acts, fp. Nouveau-Théâtre, Paris, 10 April 1894
1898	Ma Bru ! (My Daughter-in-Law)	Paul Bilhaud	fp at the Théâtre de l'Odéon, Paris, in 1898, and at the Lyceum Theatre, Manhattan, on 26 February 1900
1907	L’Âme des héros	Paul Bilhaud	one-act play in verses, created at the Comédie-Française, 6 June 1907
1908	La Courtisane de Corinthe	Paul Bilhaud, music by Charles-Gaston Levadé	Produced in 1908 by Sarah Bernhardt, at the Théâtre Sarah Bernhardt

== Selected filmography ==
- L'Enfant prodigue (1907) (scriptwriter & director)
- Marie Tudor (1912) (scriptwriter)
- The Miracle (1912) (director)
- Temptation (1936) (scriptwriter)
