= List of German films of 1929 =

This is a list of the most notable films produced in the Cinema of Germany in 1929.

Title	Director	Cast	Genre	Notes
1929
1. Mai - Weltfeiertag der Arbeiterklasse	Phil Jutzi		documentary	
100000 unter roten Fahnen	Phil Jutzi		documentary	
2. Ungarische Rhapsodie	Johannes Guter		documentary	
The Adjutant of the Czar	Vladimir Strizhevsky	Ivan Mozzhukhin, Carmen Boni	Drama	
Affair at the Grand Hotel	Domenico Gambino, Edmund Heuberger, Theodor Pistek	Jindřich Plachta, Hilde Jennings	Silent	Co-production with Czechoslovakia
After the Verdict	Henrik Galeen	Olga Chekhova, Warwick Ward	Drama	Co-production with Britain
The Age of Seventeen	Georg Asagaroff	Grete Mosheim, Hans Adalbert Schlettow	Silent	
Allah 'L. Allah			documentary	released under the series title "MGM Oddities" in the US.
Alles dreht sich, alles bewegt sich	Hans Richter		documentary	
The Alley Cat	Hans Steinhoff	Mabel Poulton, Jack Trevor	Drama	Co-production with Britain
An Ancient Art			documentary	released under the series title "MGM Oddities" in the US.
Andreas Hofer	Hans Prechtl	Fritz Greiner, Maly Delschaft	Historical	
Anesthesia	Alfred Abel	Renée Héribel, Jack Trevor	Silent	
Angel in Séparée	Ernö Mayer	Elizza La Porta, Rolf von Goth	Silent	
Asphalt	Joe May	Gustav Fröhlich	Drama	
Atlantik	Ewald André Dupont	Fritz Kortner, Elsa Wagner	Drama	German-language film made in Britain
Autobus Number Two	Max Mack	Fritz Kampers, Lee Parry	Comedy	
Beware of Loose Women	Siegfried Philippi	Rudolf Lettinger, André Mattoni	Silent	
Beyond the Street	Leo Mittler	Lissy Arna, Paul Rehkopf	Drama	
Big City Children	Arthur Haase	Grete Reinwald, Gustl Gstettenbaur	Silent	
The Black Domino	Victor Janson	Hans Junkermann, Vera Schmiterlöw	Comedy	
The Black Forest Girl	Victor Janson	Liane Haid, Walter Janssen	Romance	
Blutmai 1929	Phil Jutzi		documentary	
Bobby, the Petrol Boy	Carl Boese	Gustav Rickelt, Sophie Pagay	Silent	
The Brandenburg Arch	Max Knaake, William Dieterle	Paul Henckels, June Marlowe	Drama	
Brother Bernhard	Framz Seitz	Vera Schmiterlöw, Will Dohm	Drama	
Brothers	Werner Hochbaum	Erna Schumacher, Ilse Berger	Drama	
Brown Gold			documentary	released under the series title "MGM Oddities" in the US.
The Burning Heart	Ludwig Berger	Mady Christians, Gustav Fröhlich	Drama	
Cagliostro	Richard Oswald	Hans Stüwe, Renée Héribel	Drama	
Call of the Blood	Victor Trivas	Vera Voronina, Jan Sviták	Silent	
Call at Midnight	Mario Bonnard	Marcella Albani, Ralph Arthur Roberts	Silent	
The Call of the North	Nunzio Malasomma, Mario Bonnard	Luis Trenker, Max Holzboer	Adventure	
The Chaste Coquette	Franz Seitz	Maly Delschaft, Alfons Fryland	Silent	
Children of the Street	Carl Boese	Lissy Arna, Heinrich George	Silent	
Circumstantial Evidence	Georg Jacoby	Fritz Alberti, Ruth Weyher	Crime	
The Circus Princess	Victor Janson	Fritz Kampers, Trude Berliner	Silent	
Column X	Reinhold Schünzel	Reinhold Schünzel, Grete Reinwald	Crime	
Come Back, All Is Forgiven	Erich Schönfelder	Dina Gralla, Rudolf Biebrach	Silent	
The Convict from Istanbul	Gustav Ucicky	Heinrich George, Betty Amann	Drama	
The Crimson Circle	Frederic Zelnik	Lya Mara, Fred Louis Lerch, Stewart Rome	Crime	
Crucified Girl	Jacob Fleck, Luise Fleck	Valerie Boothby, Gertrud de Lalsky	Drama	
The Customs Judge	Carl Heinz Wolff	Margarete Schlegel, Gerd Briese	Silent	
The Daredevil Reporter	Ernst Laemmle	Eddie Polo, Gritta Ley	Thriller	
Daughter of the Regiment	Hans Behrendt	Betty Balfour, Alexander D'Arcy	Historical	Co-production with Britain
Dawn	Wolfgang Neff	Paul Henckels, Werner Fuetterer	Silent	
Dear Homeland	Carl Wilhelm	Renate Müller, Hans Albers	Comedy	
Death Drive for the World Record	Kurt Blachy	Claire Rommer, Valerie Boothby	Silent	
Devotion	Guido Brignone	Marcella Albani, Hans Adalbert Schlettow	Drama	
Diane	Erich Waschneck	Olga Chekhova, Pierre Blanchar	Silent	
Diary of a Coquette	Constantin J. David	Fee Malten, Ernst Stahl-Nachbaur	Drama	
Diary of a Lost Girl	Georg Wilhelm Pabst	Louise Brooks, Fritz Rasp, André Roanne	Drama	
Disgrace	Josef Medeotti-Bohác	Carl de Vogt, Ita Rina	Silent	Co-production with Czechoslovakia
Distinguishing Features	Edmund Heuberger	Angelo Ferrari, Georgia Lind	Crime	
The Diva	Kurt Blachy	Georg Alexander, Ágnes Esterhazy	Comedy	
Dive	E.W. Emo	Igo Sym, Sig Arno	Silent	
Do You Know That Little House on Lake Michigan?	Max W. Kimmich	Margot Landa, Lydia Potechina	Crime	
Don Manuel, the Bandit	Romano Mengon	Angelo Ferrari, Diomira Jacobini, Clifford McLaglen	Silent	
Dying Jungle			documentary	released under the series title "MGM Oddities" in the US.
The Eccentric	Walter Jerven	Karl Valentin, Liesl Karlstadt	Comedy	
Ehe im Tierreich	Ulrich K.T. Schultz, Wolfram Junghans		documentary	
Eröffnung der Thüringer Waldbahn Gotha			documentary	
Eros in Chains	Conrad Wiene	Maly Delschaft, Walter Slezak	Drama	Co-production with Austria
Escape to the Foreign Legion	Louis Ralph	Hans Stüwe, Alexander Murski	Silent	
Explosives Excavator 1010	Carl Ludwig Achaz-Duisberg	Heinrich George, Ivan Koval-Samborsky	Silent	
Father and Son	Géza von Bolváry	Harry Liedtke, Rolf von Goth	Silent	
The Favourite of Schonbrunn	Erich Waschneck	Iván Petrovich, Lil Dagover	Historical	
The Flight from Love	Hans Behrendt	Friedrich Benfer, Paul Otto	Silent	
Fight of the Tertia	Max Mack	Max Schreck, Fritz Richard	Family	
Foolish Happiness	Johannes Guter, Rudolf Walther-Fein	Fritz Kampers, Livio Pavanelli	Silent	
Foolishness of His Love	Olga Chekhova	Michael Chekhov, Dolly Davis	Silent	
Foundations of Gold			documentary	released under the series title "MGM Oddities" in the US.
The Fourth from the Right	Conrad Wiene	Ossi Oswalda, Otto Wallburg	Comedy	
Fräulein Else	Paul Czinner	Elisabeth Bergner, Albert Bassermann	Drama	
From a Bachelor's Diary	Erich Schönfelder	Reinhold Schünzel, Leopold von Ledebur	Comedy	
Furnished Room	Fred Sauer	Margot Landa, Hans Albers	Silent	
Die GEG-Fleischwarenfabrik Oldenburg in Oldenburg	Gertrud David		documentary	
Gentlemen Among Themselves	Rudolf Walther-Fein	Hermann Picha, Lydia Potechina	Silent	
German Wine	Carl Froelich	Livio Pavanelli, Henny Porten	Silent	
The Girl from the Provinces	James Bauer	Anita Dorris, Maria Forescu	Silent	
The Girl with the Whip	Carl Lamac	Anny Ondra, Sig Arno	Comedy	
The Green Monocle	Rudolf Meinert	Ralph Clancy, Betty Bird	Crime	
The Gypsy Chief	Carl Wilhelm	Paul Heidemann, Margarete Schlegel	Drama	
Des Haares und der Liebe Wellen	Walter Ruttmann			
Heilige oder Dirne	Guido Brignone	María Corda, Vladimir Gajdarov	Silent	
Her Dark Secret	Johannes Guter	Lilian Harvey, Willy Fritsch	Comedy	
The Hero of Every Girl's Dream	Robert Land	Harry Liedtke, Jeanne Helbling	Comedy	
Herz, Stadttiere, Industrie und tiefere Bedeutung: Ein Montagetraum von Albrecht Viktor Blum, gewidmet dem Bauhaus Dessau	Albrecht Viktor Blum		documentary	
High Treason	Johannes Meyer	Gerda Maurus, Gustav Fröhlich	Drama	
His Best Friend	Harry Piel	Harry Piel, Dary Holm	Thriller	
His Majesty's Lieutenant	Jacob Fleck, Luise Fleck	Iván Petrovich, Agnes Esterhazy	Romance	
Hotel of Secrets	Friedrich Feher	Magda Sonja, Angelo Ferrari	Silent	
The Hound of the Baskervilles	Richard Oswald	Carlyle Blackwell, Fritz Rasp	Mystery	
Hungarian Nights	Victor Janson	Lil Dagover, Hans Stüwe	Drama	
Hunting You	Ernst Angel	Valerie Boothby, Hans Schweikart	Silent	
I Kiss Your Hand, Madame	Robert Land	Harry Liedtke, Marlene Dietrich	Drama	
I Lost My Heart on a Bus	Carlo Campogalliani, Domenico Gambino	Truus Van Aalten, Lydia Potechina	Comedy	
Incest	James Bauer	Walter Rilla, Olga Chekhova	Drama	
Inherited Passions	Gustav Ucicky	Walter Rilla, Fritz Alberti	Drama	
Das Inselland aus Feuer und Eis - Island II			documentary	
It's You I Have Loved	Rudolf Walther-Fein	Mady Christians, Hans Stüwe	Drama	
Jenny's Stroll Through Men	Jaap Speyer	Olga Limburg, Harry Halm	Silent	
Jungle Orphans			documentary	released under the series title "MGM Oddities" in the US.
Kalif Storch	Hans Fischerkoesen		animation	
Die Kapelle Etté spielt den Ramona	Walter Ruttmann			
Katharina Knie	Karl Grune	Eugen Klöpfer, Carmen Boni	Drama	
A Knight in London	Lupu Pick	Lilian Harvey, Ivy Duke	Drama	Co-production with Britain
Kreislauf des Wassers	Albrecht Viktor Blum		documentary	
Kreuzzug der Maschine	Albrecht Viktor Blum		documentary	
Der Künstler und sein Selbstporträt	Alwin Steinitz		documentary	
Land Without Women	Carmine Gallone	Conrad Veidt, Elga Brink	Drama	
Lacquer and Pearls			documentary	released under the series title "MGM Oddities" in the US.
The Last Testament	Rolf Randolf	Carlo Aldini, Daisy D'Ora	Silent	Co-production with Switzerland
Latin Quarter	Augusto Genina	Gina Manès, Carmen Boni	Drama	
The Leader			documentary	released under the series title "MGM Oddities" in the US.
The League of Three	Hans Behrendt	Jenny Jugo, Max Maximilian	Crime	
Left of the Isar, Right of the Spree	Franz Seitz	Georgia Lind, Albert Paulig	Silent	
Die letzten Adler	Bengt Berg		documentary	
Little Veronica	Robert Land	Käthe von Nagy, Maly Delschaft	Silent	
The Living Corpse	Fyodor Otsep	Vsevolod Pudovkin, Maria Jacobini	Drama	Co-production with the Soviet Union
The Lord of the Tax Office	Siegfried Philippi	Leo Peukert, Else Reval	Comedy	
The Love of the Brothers Rott	Erich Waschneck	Olga Chekhova, Jameson Thomas	Silent	
Love in the Snow	Max Obal, Rudolf Walther-Fein	Livio Pavanelli, Maria Paudler	Silent	
Ludwig II, King of Bavaria	William Dieterle	William Dieterle, Theodor Loos	Historical	
Lux, King of Criminals	Edmund Heuberger	Carl Auen, Fred Immler	Silent	
Madame Lu	Franz Hofer	Ida Wüst, Hans Mierendorff	Silent	
The Man with the Frog	Gerhard Lamprecht	Heinrich George, Evelyn Holt	Crime	
The Man Without Love	Guido Brignone	Gustav Diessl, Agnes Esterhazy	Drama	Co-production with France
Manolescu	Viktor Tourjansky	Ivan Mozzhukhin, Brigitte Helm, Heinrich George	Silent	
Marriage	Eberhard Frowein	Lil Dagover, Gustav Diessl	Silent	
Marriage in Trouble	Richard Oswald	Elga Brink, Walter Rilla	Drama	
Mascots	Felix Basch	Käthe von Nagy, Jeanne Helbling	Silent	
Masks	Rudolf Meinert	Karl Ludwig Diehl, Trude Berliner	Crime	
Melody of the Heart	Hanns Schwarz	Dita Parlo, Willy Fritsch	Musical	
Melody of the World	Walter Ruttmann	Renée Stobrawa, Wilhelm Cuno		
Men Without Work	Harry Piel	Harry Piel, Dary Holm	Silent	
The Merry Widower	Robert Land	Harry Liedtke, La Jana	Comedy	
Misled Youth	Richard Löwenbein	Fritz Alberti, Erna Morena	Drama	
Miss Midshipman	Fred Sauer	Willi Forst, Fritz Schulz	Comedy	
The Mistress and her Servant	Richard Oswald	Henny Porten, Fritz Kampers	Comedy	
Der möblierte Herr	Hans Fischerkoesen		animation	
The Model from Montparnasse	Wilhelm Thiele	Lilian Harvey, Igo Sym	Comedy	
Mother Krause's Journey to Happiness	Phil Jutzi	Ilse Trautschold, Gerhard Bienert	Drama	
A Mother's Love	Georg Jacoby	Henny Porten, Gustav Diessl	Drama	
My Daughter's Tutor	Géza von Bolváry	Harry Liedtke, Dolly Davis	Comedy	
My Heart is a Jazz Band	Frederic Zelnik	Lya Mara, Raimondo Van Riel	Drama	
My Sister and I	Manfred Noa	Mady Christians, Hans Junkermann	Comedy	
Napoleon at Saint Helena	Lupu Pick	Werner Krauss, Hanna Ralph	Historical	
The Night Belongs to Us	Carl Froelich, Henry Roussel	Hans Albers, Charlotte Ander	Sports	
The Night of Terror	Gennaro Righelli	Fritz Kortner, Renée Héribel, Alma Taylor	Silent	
Der Nürnberger Parteitag der NSDAP (The Nuremberg Convention of the NSDAP)				
Om mani padme hum	Wilhelm Filchner		documentary	
Once at Midnight	Karl Otto Krause	Betty Astor, Alfons Fryland	Comedy	
Once You Give Away Your Heart	Johannes Guter	Lilian Harvey, Igo Sym	Romance	
On the Reeperbahn at Half Past Midnight	Fred Stranz	Eddie Polo, Lydia Potechina	Adventure	
Oriental Motoring			documentary	released under the series title "MGM Oddities" in the US.
Outlandish Manners			documentary	released under the series title "MGM Oddities" in the US.
Painted Youth	Carl Boese	Wolfgang Zilzer, Olga Limburg	Silent	
Pandora's Box	Georg Wilhelm Pabst	Louise Brooks, Francis Lederer, Fritz Körtner	Drama	
Pavement Butterfly	Richard Eichberg	Anna May Wong, Alexander Granach	Drama	Co-production with the UK
Perjury	Georg Jacoby	Francis Lederer, Miles Mander	Drama	
A Persian Wedding			documentary	released under the series title "MGM Oddities" in the US.
Peter the Mariner	Reinhold Schünzel	Renate Müller, Rudolf Biebrach	Comedy	
Play Around a Man	Robert Land	Liane Haid, Fred Louis Lerch	Silent	
Poison Gas	Mikhail Dubson	Hans Stüwe, Lissy Arna	Drama	
Pori	Baron A. von Dungern		documentary	
Prisoner Number Seven	Lajos Lázár, Paul Sugar	Hans Adalbert Schlettow, Charlotte Susa	Thriller	Co-production with Hungary
Quer durch den Sport	Albrecht Viktor Blum		documentary	
Queen of Fashion	Max Obal, Rudolf Walther-Fein	Harry Liedtke, María Corda	Comedy	
Revenge for Eddy	Otz Tollen	Eddie Polo, Victor Colani	Thriller	
Revolt in the Batchelor's House	Manfred Noa	Sig Arno, Kurt Gerron	Comedy	
Richthofen	Peter Joseph, Desider Kertesz	Carl Walther Meyer, Helga Thomas	War	
The Right of the Unborn	Adolf Trotz	Maly Delschaft, Elizza La Porta	Drama	
Roses Bloom on the Moorland	Kurt Blachy	Wolfgang von Schwind, Hertha Guthmar	Historical	
The Royal Box	Bryan Foy	Alexander Moissi, Camilla Horn	Historical	Made in the US
The Runaway Princess	Fritz Wendhausen	Mady Christians, Norah Baring	Mystery	Co-production with Britain
Rustle of Spring	William Dieterle	Lien Deyers, Julius Brandt	Romance	
Saint Joan the Maid	Marco de Gastyne	Simone Genevois, Fernand Mailly	Historical	Co-production with France
Scandal in Baden-Baden	Erich Waschneck	Brigitte Helm, Ernst Stahl-Nachbaur	Silent	
The Secret Adversary	Fred Sauer	Carlo Aldini, Hilda Bayley, Eve Gray	Mystery	
Secret Boozehounds			documentary	released under the series title "MGM Oddities" in the US.
Secret Police	Edmund Heuberger	Eddie Polo, Rina Marsa	Thriller	
The Shadow of a Mine	Phil Jutzi	Holmes Zimmermann, Sybille Schloss	Drama	
Ship in Distress	Carmine Gallone	Liane Haid, Alfons Fryland	Drama	
Ship of Girls	Robert Wohlmuth	Margot Landa, Luigi Serventi	Drama	Co-production with Austria
The Ship of Lost Souls	Maurice Tourneur	Fritz Kortner, Marlene Dietrich	Thriller	
Silence in the Forest	William Dieterle	William Dieterle, Rina Marsa	Drama	
Sin and Morality	Erich Kober	Charlotte Susa, Leopold von Ledebur	Silent	
Sinful and Sweet	Carl Lamac	Anny Ondra, Toni Tetzlaff	Comedy	
Sin of a Beautiful Woman	Carl Lamac	Josef Rovenský, Marcella Albani	Drama	Co-production with Czechoslovakia
A Small Down Payment on Bliss	Jaap Speyer	Dina Gralla, Paul Hörbiger	Comedy	
The Smuggler's Bride of Mallorca	Hans Behrendt	Jenny Jugo, Friedrich Benfer	Romance	
Somnambul	Adolf Trotz	Fritz Kortner, Erna Morena	Horror	
Spring Awakening	Richard Oswald	Mathilde Sussin, Paul Henckels	Drama	Co-production with Czechoslovakia
Storm of Love	Martin Berger	Marcella Albani, Nikolai Malikoff	Silent	
Street Acquaintances	Josef Medeotti-Bohác; Alwin Neuß	Theodor Pistek, Werner Pittschau	Silent	Co-production with Czechoslovakia
Studie Nr. 1	Oskar Fischinger		Animation	
Sweet Pepper	Fred Sauer	Eve Gray, Margit Manstad	Silent	
Taxi at Midnight	Harry Piel	Harry Piel, Betty Bird	Thriller	
Tempo! Tempo!	Max Obal	Luciano Albertini, Trude Berliner	Silent	
Their Son	Joe May, Gennaro Righelli	Gaston Jacquet, Paul Richter	Drama	
There Was Once a Loyal Hussar	Carl Heinz Wolff	Grit Haid, Olga Limburg	Silent	
They May Not Marry	Carl Heinz Rudolph	Olga Engl, Colette Brettel	Silent	
The Third Confession	James Bauer	Hertha von Walther, Olaf Fjord	Silent	
Three Around Edith	Erich Waschneck	Camilla Horn, Jack Trevor	Silent	
Three Days of Life and Death	Heinz Paul	Carl de Vogt, Angelo Ferrari	War	
The Three Kings	Hans Steinhoff	Henry Edwards, Evelyn Holt	Drama	Co-production with Britain
A Throw of Dice	Franz Osten	Seeta Devi, Himansu Rai	Silent	Co-production with Britain
Tracks in the Snow	Willy Reiber	Peter Voß, Will Dohm	Silent	
Tragedy of Youth	Adolf Trotz	Roland Varno, Eva Speyer	Drama	
Triumph of Love	William Dieterle	William Dieterle, Lien Deyers	Silent	
Trust of Thieves	Erich Schönfelder	Agnes Esterhazy, Paul Otto	Silent	
The Tsarevich	Jacob Fleck, Luise Fleck	Iván Petrovich, Marietta Millner	Historical	
Two Brothers	Mikhail Dubson	Hilde Jennings, Maria Forescu	Silent	
The Unusual Past of Thea Carter	Ernst Laemmle	Olaf Fønss, June Marlowe	Silent	
Unser Jungvolk studiert	Gertrud David		documentary	
Uphill and Down			documentary	released under the series title "MGM Oddities" in the US.
The Veil Dancer	Charles Burguet	René Navarre, Hertha von Walther	Silent	Co-production with France
Waterloo	Karl Grune	Charles Willy Kayser, Charles Vanel	War	
The Way Through the Night	Robert Dinesen	Käthe von Nagy, Sophie Pagay	Silent	
Das Wetterhäuschen	Gerda Otto, Hedwig Otto		animation	
We Stick Together Through Thick and Thin	Herbert Nossen	Sig Arno, Kurt Gerron	Comedy	
When the White Lilacs Bloom Again	Robert Wohlmuth	Georg Henrich, Vera Schmiterlöw	Silent	
The White Hell of Pitz Palu	Georg Wilhelm Pabst, Arnold Fanck	Leni Riefenstahl, Gustav Diessl	Adventure	
What a Woman Dreams of in Springtime	Curt Blachnitzky	Paul Rehkopf, Colette Brettel	Comedy	
What Price Love?	E.W. Emo	Igo Sym, Hilde von Stolz	Silent	
What's Wrong with Nanette?	Holger-Madsen	Ruth Weyher, Georg Alexander	Comedy	
The White Roses of Ravensberg	Rudolf Meinert	Diana Karenne, Jack Trevor	Melodrama	
Why Cry at Parting?	Richard Eichberg	Dina Gralla, Harry Halm	Silent	
Wille und Werk	Werner Hochbaum		documentary	
The Woman Everyone Loves Is You	Carl Froelich	Henny Porten, Fritz Kampers	Silent	
The Woman in the Advocate's Gown	Adolf Trotz	Aud Egede-Nissen, Fritz Kortner	Silent	
Woman in the Moon	Fritz Lang	Willy Fritsch, Gerda Maurus, Fritz Rasp	Science fiction	A realistic planetary romance
Women on the Edge	Georg Jacoby	Gustav Diessl, Elga Brink	Drama	
The Woman One Longs For	Curtis Bernhardt	Marlene Dietrich, Fritz Kortner	Drama	
The Wonderful Lies of Nina Petrovna	Hanns Schwarz	Brigitte Helm, Francis Lederer	Drama	
The Wrecker	Géza von Bolváry	Carlyle Blackwell, Benita Hume	Crime	Co-production with Britain
Yes, Yes, Women Are My Weakness	Edmund Heuberger	Georgia Lind, Hans Albers	Comedy	
Youth of the Big City	Rudolf Walther-Fein	Harry Liedtke, Ida Wüst	Drama	
Youthful Indiscretion	Carl Heinz Wolff	Martin Herzberg, Carola Höhn	Silent	
The Youths	Edmund Heuberger	Georgia Lind, Anton Pointner	Silent	
