= Joe Pasternak =

American film producer (1901–1991)

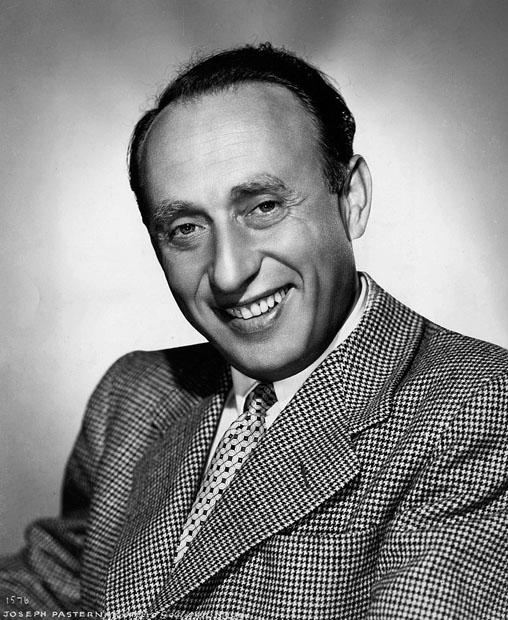
- Pasternak in 1957
- Born: József Paszternák; September 19, 1901; Szilágysomlyó, Austria-Hungary (today Șimleu Silvaniei, Romania)
- Died: September 13, 1991 (aged 89); Beverly Hills, California, U.S.
- Resting place: Hillside Memorial Park Cemetery
- Occupations: Film producer, director
- Years active: 1923–1968
- Spouse: Dorothy Darrell (m. 1942) (1919-2000)
- Children: 4

Joseph Herman Pasternak (born József Paszternák; September 19, 1901 – September 13, 1991) was a Hungarian-American film producer in Hollywood. Pasternak spent the Hollywood "Golden Age" of musicals at Metro-Goldwyn-Mayer, producing many successful musicals with female singing stars like Deanna Durbin, Kathryn Grayson and Jane Powell, as well as swimmer/bathing beauty Esther Williams' films. He produced Judy Garland's final MGM film, Summer Stock, which was released in 1950, and some of Gene Kelly’s early breakthrough roles. Pasternak worked in the film industry for 45 years, from the later silent era until shortly past the end of the classical Hollywood cinema in 1967.

== Biography ==
=== Early life ===
He was born to a Jewish family in Szilágysomlyó, Austria-Hungary (now Șimleu Silvaniei, Romania). His father was a town clerk and Pasternak was one of 11 children.

In 1920, he immigrated to the U.S. and stayed with an uncle in Philadelphia. He worked in a factory, punching holes in leather belts, and did a variety of other jobs. He also studied acting in New York.

=== Assistant director ===
In 1922, Pasternak gained a job as a busboy at Paramount's Astoria studio in Queens, New York City at $8 a week; after a year, he was head waiter and making $120 per week, including tips. He quit in 1923 to become an assistant for director Allan Dwan and worked his way up from fourth assistant at $16 per week to first assistant at $75 per week.

He worked as an assistant director on The Phantom of the Opera (1925) and It's the Old Army Game (1926).

He tried directing, a two-reeler with El Brendel. It was seen by Wesley Ruggles who offered him a job at Universal Studios as an assistant director at $35 a week.

=== Germany ===
In 1928, Universal sent Pasternak to Europe as an associate producer to work on German-language films for the international market. Pasternak produced a series of movies directed by, and often starring, William Dieterle: The Brandenburg Arch in 1929 with Paul Henckels and June Marlowe; Triumph of Love and Silence in the Forest also in 1929; Rustle of Spring and Ludwig II, King of Bavaria, a drama, both in 1930, and One Hour of Happiness in 1931. Pasternak also produced three films directed by Edmund Heuberger and starring Eddie Polo: Secret Police (1929), Witnesses Wanted (1930), and Of Life and Death (1930).

Other Pasternak films included The Daredevil Reporter (1929), written by Billy Wilder, starring Eddie Polo and directed by Ernst Laemmle; Next, Please! (1930) directed by Erich Schönfelder; Two People (1930) with Charlotte Susa directed by Erich Waschneck; The Great Longing (1930), directed by Steve Sekely; Seitensprünge (Infidelity, 1931); Ich geh' aus und Du bleibst da (The Inconstant: I go out and you stay here in German and French, 1931); Der Storch streikt (The Stork Strikes, 1931); The Night Without Pause (1931) with Sig Arno co-directed by Andrew Marton; Bobby geht los (Bobby goes off, 1931); A Tremendously Rich Man (1932); Five from the Jazz Band (1932) directed by Erich Engel; and The Rebel (1932), a historical epic directed by Curtis Bernhardt, Edwin H. Knopf and star Luis Trenker.

Pasternak shot Secret Agent (1932) and Johnny Steals Europe (1932) both with Harry Piel, then A Tremendously Rich Man (1932) with director Steve Sekely, Die unsichtbare Front (The Invisible Secretary, 1933) and Pardon, tévedtem (Excuse me, I was wrong, 1933). (Note translations are basic, not officially approved titles.)

=== Hungary ===
When Hitler came to power in Germany, Pasternak moved to Hungary. There he did a series of films starring Franciska Gaal: Romance in Budapest (1933) with Sekely (also shot in German as Scandal in Budapest); A Precocious Girl (1934), directed by Max Neufeld and Richard Eichberg; Spring Parade (1934); Peter (1934) directed by Henry Koster; Little Mother (1934) (later remade in Hollywood as Bachelor Mother); and Catherine the Last (1936).

=== Universal in Hollywood ===
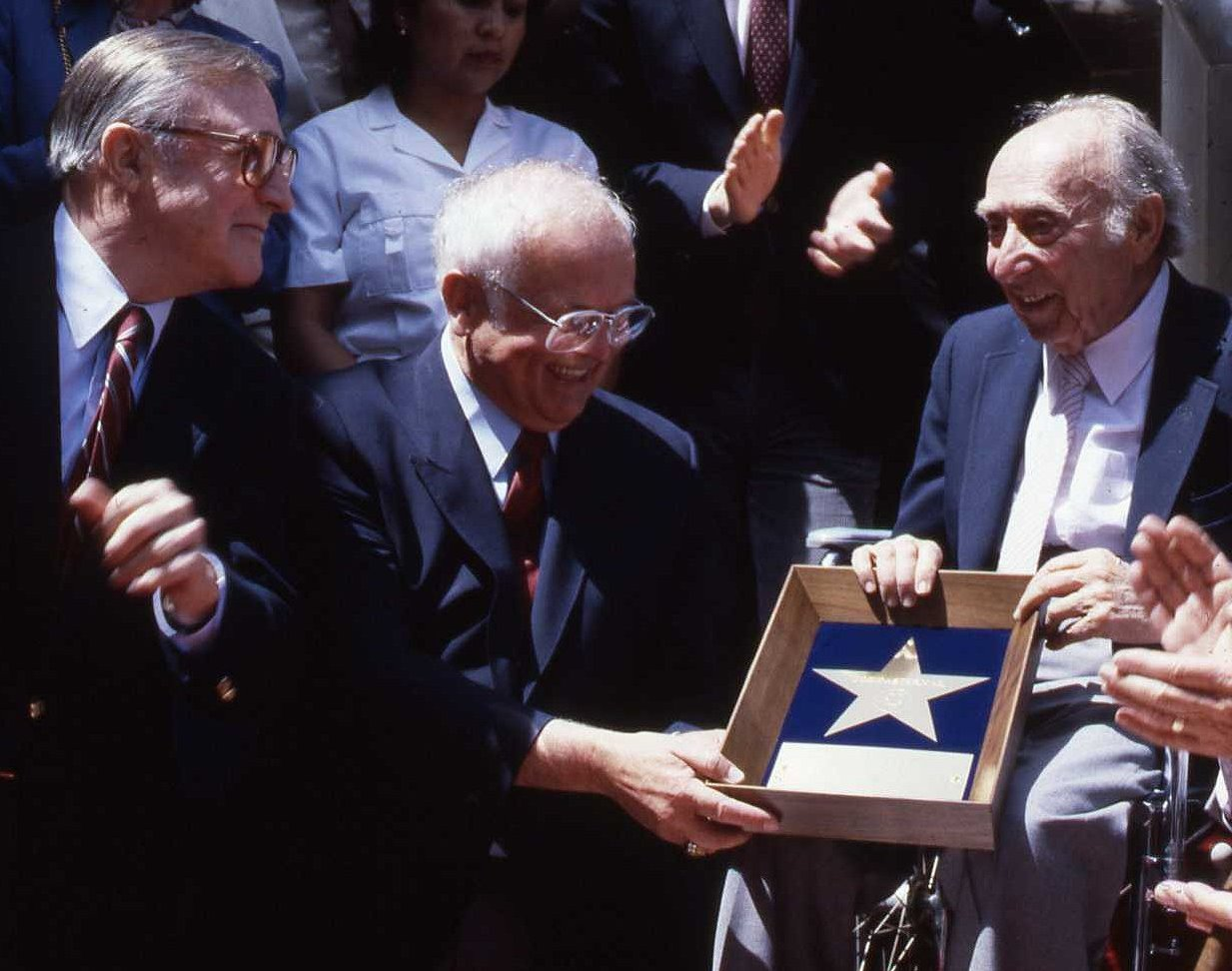
Pasternak (right) receiving his star on Hollywood Boulevard from Johnny Grant with Gene Kelly on the left on July 29, 1991.

Universal recalled Pasternak, giving him a $500 a week contract. He brought back Henry Koster with him and the two men set about making the sort of movie they had in Europe. "No one's going to get sick or die in my pictures", Pasternak said at the time. "That's no form of entertainment."

After seeing her in the short Every Sunday (1936), Pasternak cast 14-year-old Canadian singer Deanna Durbin in Three Smart Girls (also 1936), directed by Koster. The film became a huge hit and reputedly saved Universal from bankruptcy. He followed it with two more Durbin films, One Hundred Men and a Girl (1937), directed by Koster, and Mad About Music (1938), directed by Norman Taurog. In 1938, Pasternak did a comedy, Youth Takes a Fling, then was back with Durbin for That Certain Age (1938), and Three Smart Girls Grow Up (1939). In all, Pasternak made ten films with Durbin.

Pasternak soon discovered soprano Gloria Jean, who began her own series in 1939, starting with The Under-Pup (1939). He produced Durbin again in First Love (1939). He had a large hit with the comedy Western Destry Rides Again (1939), starring Marlene Dietrich and James Stewart, which helped revitalise Dietrich's career.

Pasternak alternated among the three female stars. With Durbin, he did It's a Date (1940), Spring Parade (1940) (a remake of his 1934 film), Nice Girl? (1940) and It Started with Eve (1941). With Jean, he did A Little Bit of Heaven (1940), a sort of sequel to The Under-Pup. With Dietrich, he did Seven Sinners (1940) (with John Wayne) and The Flame of New Orleans (1941).

In June 1941, after finishing Eve, Pasterrnak left Universal. Although he still had two years to run on his contract, he had "differences of opinion" with the studio's management, and by mutual consent, the parties elected to terminate the contract.

=== MGM ===
In June 1941, Pasternak announced he had joined Metro-Goldwyn-Mayer as a producer for a reported $3,500 per week. Several studios had been interested in placing him under contract, but Louis B. Mayer wanted Pasternak and allowed the producer several concessions. Mayer assigned young soprano Kathryn Grayson, who had only made one film for MGM, to Pasternak's unit so that he might make her into a star like Durbin. Pasternak later sat on the executive committee and came to be regarded as one of the three most important persons in the company, alongside Louis B. Mayer and Vice President Sam Katz.

At MGM, he continued to produce operetta films, starting with Seven Sweethearts (1942) starring Grayson, and Presenting Lily Mars (1943) starring Judy Garland. Both films were successful at the box-office. Pasternak followed these with Thousands Cheer (1943) with Grayson and Gene Kelly, which was a huge hit; Song of Russia (1944), a musical which later became problematic because of its pro-Russian viewpoint; Two Girls and a Sailor (1944) with June Allyson, Van Johnson and Gloria DeHaven, and Music for Millions (1944) with Allyson and Margaret O'Brien. All these films were hits.

Pasternak was responsible for Esther Williams' first vehicle Thrill of a Romance (1945); it made over $3 million in profits. Similarly well received by audiences was Anchors Aweigh (1945) with Grayson, Gene Kelly and Frank Sinatra. Pasternak also made several non-musical romantic comedy hits, including Her Highness and the Bellboy (1945) with Hedy Lamarr and Robert Walker, and No Leave, No Love (1946) with Johnson. However, around this time Pasternak mostly specialized in musicals: Two Sisters from Boston (1946) with Grayson and Allyson was a box-office success, as was, Holiday in Mexico (1946) with Walter Pidgeon and Jane Powell in her debut for MGM. However, The Unfinished Dance (1947) with O'Brien and Cyd Charisse lost over a million dollars – the first Pasternak MGM film to do so. This Time for Keeps (1947) with Esther Williams, was profitable.

In 1948, Pasternak had mixed results. Three Daring Daughters in 1948 with Powell and Jeanette MacDonald, while popular, lost money. Pasternak also tried his first drama in the U.S. with Big City (1948), starring O'Brien, which was a big money loser. More popular were the 1948 musicals On an Island with You with Williams; A Date with Judy with Jane Powell, Wallace Beery and Elizabeth Taylor; and Luxury Liner again with Powell. Pasternak unfortunately had a big flop with the Sinatra-Grayson musical The Kissing Bandit that same year, which lost MGM over $2 million.

Pasternak bounced back with In the Good Old Summertime (1949) with Garland and Johnson, and introduced Mario Lanza in That Midnight Kiss with Kathryn Grayson, which was a solid hit. Nancy Goes to Rio with Powell, a remake of It's a Date, made a minor loss. In 1950, The Toast of New Orleans with Grayson was a solid hit, as was Duchess of Idaho with Williams. Pasternak produced the final Judy Garland film at MGM, Summer Stock in 1950, co-starring Gene Kelly, and then had the biggest hit of his career to date with The Great Caruso (1951), a vehicle for Mario Lanza which made almost $4 million in profit for the studio. After the popular Rich, Young and Pretty (1951) with Powell, Pasternak made a film noir with Mickey Rooney, The Strip (1951) which flopped.

Typical was Skirts Ahoy! (1952) with Esther Williams; The Merry Widow (1952) with Lana Turner and Fernando Lamas; and Because You're Mine (1952) with Lanza. Small Town Girl (1953) with Powell lost money, as did Latin Lovers (1953) with Turner and Ricardo Montalbán, but Easy to Love (1953) with Williams and Johnson was another hit.

Pasternak again tried a drama, this time with Turner, Flame and the Flesh (1954), but it was not a notable success. However, The Student Prince (1954) with Ann Blyth and Edmund Purdom miming to Mario Lanza singing, was a huge success. Pasternak did Hit the Deck (1955) with Powell, Vic Damone and Debbie Reynolds, which was popular but failed to recoup its cost. Athena in 1955 with Powell, Reynolds, Damone and Purdom, was a straight out flop. Meet Me in Las Vegas (1955) with Charisse was well received, but failed to recoup its cost.

The industry was changing, and musicals were becoming increasingly unprofitable for MGM. Conversely, a tough biopic Pasternak produced about Ruth Etting, Love Me or Leave Me (1955), starring Doris Day and James Cagney, was a hit. In 1956, Pasternak published his memoir Easy the Hard Way. Pasternak had two big flop musicals, The Opposite Sex (1956), a remake of The Women (1939) with Allyson, and Ten Thousand Bedrooms (1957) with Dean Martin. Also unsuccessful was the Jean Simmons comedy This Could Be the Night (also 1957). It was then time for a change.

=== Euterpe ===
In April 1956, Pasternak left MGM after 14 years. He set up the independent production company Euterpe with Sam Katz. They made an agreement with Columbia to finance their films, and announced several projects: The Chiselers starring Alan Ladd; Three Blondes; Gidget, based on the novel by Frederick Kohner; and Nora, an original screenplay by Felix Jackson. However Euterpe and Columbia could not come to terms and dissolved their agreement in November 1957.

Pasternak set up Euterpe back at MGM. He was an immediate success, turning out four hits in a row: a highly regarded thriller, Party Girl (1958), with Robert Taylor and Cyd Charisse; two comedies with David Niven: Ask Any Girl (1959) with Shirley MacLaine and Please Don't Eat the Daisies (1960) with Day; and a teen comedy, Where the Boys Are (1960), which introduced a group of new stars: George Hamilton, Dolores Hart, Yvette Mimieux, Connie Francis, Jim Hutton, and Paula Prentiss.

In the 1960s, Pasternak produced a mix of hits and misses. He reunited Hutton and Prentiss in The Horizontal Lieutenant (1962), but it was not as popular as Boys. Then he had a failure with Billy Rose's Jumbo (1962) starring Day, which lost almost $4 million. However, Pasternak responded with a comedy starring Glenn Ford, The Courtship of Eddie's Father (1963) that was a hit; the film featured Ronny Howard (later known as Ron Howard), showing the producer still retained an ability to discover young performers. Less successful was A Ticklish Affair (1963) with Shirley Jones and Looking for Love (1964) with Francis and Hutton. He did a poorly-received musical with Ann-Margret (in a part turned down by Doris Day), Made in Paris (1966), then made two Elvis Presley films co-starring Shelley Fabares, Girl Happy (1965) and Spinout (1966), both of which made money. He also did a Natalie Wood comedy Penelope (1966), which was a box-office disappointment.

Pasternak produced the 1965, 1966 and 1967 Academy Awards. In 1966 he was honored with a retrospective of his work.

=== 20th Century Fox ===
In 1967, Pasternak left MGM and became affiliated with 20th Century Fox, but made only one film for Fox, The Sweet Ride (1968). Pasternak had a stroke before filming, and Sweet Ride would turn out to be his last film. In 1968, he was also stricken with Parkinson's disease. He recovered slightly two years later but made no more films. He said at the time: "I am proud that I have produced 105 pictures and not one of them is adults only."

In 1980, he estimated his films had earned $400 million. "If I had a percentage I'd be the richest man in town", he said. His career as a film producer spanned 40 years and earned him two Oscar nominations and three Golden Globe Award nominations. He retired in 1968.

== Personal ==
Pasternak is the father of Michael Joseph Pasternak, the radio disc jockey known as Emperor Rosko; Jeff Pasternak, a playwright and songwriter; and Peter Pasternak, a music industry professional. He was married to Dorothy.

Pasternak also wrote a cookbook titled Cooking with Love and Paprika, published by Bernard Geis Associates in 1966. The book includes stories of dinner parties, entertaining tips, his life history, and Hungarian recipes.

== Death and tribute ==
Joe Pasternak died in Beverly Hills, California from complications arising from Parkinson's disease six days before his 90th birthday. He is interred in the Hillside Memorial Park Cemetery in Culver City, California. For his contribution to the motion picture industry, Joe Pasternak has a star on the Hollywood Walk of Fame at 1541 N. Vine Street. David Chandler (writer) recorded and wrote the autobiography of Joe Pasternak, Easy the Hard Way, published by G.P. Putnam's Sons, New York 1956.

== Partial filmography ==
- Ludwig II, King of Bavaria (1929)
- Rustle of Spring (1929)
- Secret Police (1929)
- The Daredevil Reporter (1929)
- Two People (1930)
- Witnesses Wanted (1930)
- Of Life and Death (1930)
- Next, Please! (1930)
- The Night Without Pause (1931)
- I Go Out and You Stay Here (1931)
- Bobby Gets Going (1931)
- Five from the Jazz Band (1932)
- The Rebel (1932)
- A Tremendously Rich Man (1932)
- Secret Agent (1932)
- The Invisible Front (1932)
- Romance in Budapest (1933)
- Scandal in Budapest (1933)
- Peter (1934)
- Spring Parade (1934)
- A Precocious Girl (1934)
- Little Mother (1935)
- Catherine the Last (1936)
- Three Smart Girls (1936)
- One Hundred Men and a Girl (1937)
- Mad About Music (1938)
- Youth Takes a Fling (1938)
- That Certain Age (1938)
- Three Smart Girls Grow Up (1938)
- The Under-Pup (1939)
- Rio (1939)
- First Love (1939)
- Destry Rides Again (1939)
- It's a Date (1940)
- Spring Parade (1940)
- A Little Bit of Heaven (1940)
- Seven Sinners (1940)
- Nice Girl? (1940)
- The Flame of New Orleans (1941)
- It Started with Eve (1941)
- Seven Sweethearts (1942)
- Presenting Lily Mars (1943)
- Thousands Cheer (1943)
- Song of Russia (1944)
- Two Girls and a Sailor (1944)
- Music for Millions (1944)
- Thrill of a Romance (1945)
- Anchors Aweigh (1945)
- Her Highness and the Bellboy (1945)
- Two Sisters from Boston (1946)
- Holiday in Mexico (1946)
- No Leave, No Love (1946)
- The Unfinished Dance (1947)
- This Time for Keeps (1947)
- Three Daring Daughters (1948)
- Big City (1948)
- On an Island with You (1948)
- A Date with Judy (1948)
- Luxury Liner (1948)
- The Kissing Bandit (1948)
- In the Good Old Summertime (1949)
- That Midnight Kiss (1949)
- Nancy Goes to Rio (1950)
- Duchess of Idaho (1950)
- The Toast of New Orleans (1950)
- Summer Stock (1950)
- The Great Caruso (1951)
- Rich, Young and Pretty (1951)
- The Strip (1951)
- Skirts Ahoy! (1952)
- The Merry Widow (1952)
- Because You're Mine (1952)
- Small Town Girl (1953)
- Latin Lovers (1953)
- Easy to Love (1953)
- Flame and the Flesh (1954)
- The Student Prince (1954)
- Athena (1954)
- Hit the Deck (1955)
- Love Me or Leave Me (1955)
- Meet Me in Las Vegas (1956)
- The Opposite Sex (1956)
- Ten Thousand Bedrooms (1957)
- This Could Be the Night (1957)
- Party Girl (1958)
- Ask Any Girl (1959)
- Please Don't Eat the Daisies (1960)
- Where the Boys Are (1960)
- The Horizontal Lieutenant (1962)
- Billy Rose's Jumbo (1962)
- The Courtship of Eddie's Father (1963)
- A Ticklish Affair (1963)
- Looking for Love (1964)
- Girl Happy (1965)
- Spinout (1966)
- Made in Paris (1966)
- Penelope (1966)
- The Sweet Ride (1968)
