= Silence in the Forest =

Silence in the Forest (German:Das Schweigen im Walde) may refer to:

- Silence in the Forest (novel), an 1899 novel written Ludwig Ganghofer
- Silence in the Forest (1929 film), a German silent film
- Silence in the Forest (1937 film), a German film
- Silence in the Forest (1955 film), a West German film
- Silence in the Forest (1976 film), a West German film
