= Tingeltangel (film) =

1922 film directed by Otto Rippert

- Directed by: Otto Rippert
- Written by: Bobby E. Lüthge; Friedrich Sieburg
- Cinematography: Willy Hameister
- Production company: Terra Film
- Distributed by: Terra Film
- Release date: 10 March 1922
- Country: Germany
- Languages: Silent; German intertitles

Tingeltangel is a 1922 German silent film directed by Otto Rippert and starring Gisela Schönfeld, Friedrich Kühne and Hans Heinrich von Twardowski.

The film's art direction was by Gustav A. Knauer.

== Cast ==
- Gisela Schönfeld as Mimi
- Friedrich Kühne as Pat Handfour
- Hans Heinrich von Twardowski as Frank
- Arnold Korff as John Sventrop
- Emil Albes
- Wilhelm Bendow
- Carl Bernhardt
- Hugo Döblin
- Carl Geppert
- Charlotte Hagenbruch
- Magda Madeleine
- Jenny Marba
- Hermann Picha
- Tzwetta Tzatschewa

== Bibliography ==
- Margot Pehle & Heidi Westhoff. Hätte ich das Kino!. 1976.
