= Siegfried Berisch =

German-Jewish actor

Siegfried Berisch (15 January 1877 – 4 October 1933) was a German-Jewish actor active in the early 20th century. He was born in Boskovice, in the South Moravian Region, Czech Republic. Berisch was recognized for his work in theater and film, particularly in Berlin's cabaret and musical theater scene.

== Partial filmography ==
- 1922: Der Bekannte Unbekannte
- 1923: The Tiger of Circus Farini
- 1925: Countess Maritza
- 1926: The Queen of the Baths
- 1926: The Three Mannequins
- 1926: The Queen of the Baths
- 1927: The Salvation Army Girl
- 1927: The False Prince
- 1929: The Veil Dancer
- 1930: Mischievous Miss
- 1929: The Veil Dancer
- 1929: Yes, Yes, Women Are My Weakness
- 1929: A Mother's Love
- 1930: Darling of the Gods
- 1930: The Man in the Dark
- 1930: Next, Please!
- 1930: Retreat on the Rhine
- 1931: The Office Manager
- 1931: Without Meyer, No Celebration is Complete
- 1931: Berlin-Alexanderplatz
- 1932: No Money Needed
