= Rasputin, Demon with Women =

1932 German drama film

- Theatrical film poster
- German: Rasputin, Dämon der Frauen
- Directed by: Adolf Trotz
- Written by: Osip Dymov; Adolf Lantz; Conrad Linz
- Produced by: Ludwig Gottschalk
- Starring: Conrad Veidt; Paul Otto; Hermine Sterler
- Cinematography: Curt Courant
- Edited by: Geza Pollatschik
- Music by: Wladimir Metzl; Fritz Wenneis
- Production company: Gottschalk Tonfilm
- Distributed by: Union-Film
- Release date: 19 February 1932
- Running time: 82 minutes
- Country: Germany
- Language: German

Rasputin, Demon with Women (German: Rasputin, Dämon der Frauen) is a 1932 German drama film directed by Adolf Trotz and starring Conrad Veidt, Paul Otto and Hermine Sterler. It was shot at the Halensee Studios and Terra Studios in Berlin. The film's sets were designed by the art directors Gustav A. Knauer and Walter Reimann. It portrays the influence wielded by Grigori Rasputin over the Russian Royal Family around the time of the First World War. It was released the same year as an American film about him Rasputin and the Empress. Felix Yusupov sued the filmmakers for his portrayal, but ultimately dropped his case. The film was banned in Germany in 1933 following the Nazi Party's rise to power.

== Synopsis ==
Rasputin's success as mystical healer in a small village leads him to be sought and brought to St. Petersburg by the authorities. Despite his façade of mysticism, he is also an avid womaniser, leading to widespread resentment. However, his success with the gravely ill son of Nicholas II and Czarina Alexandra leads to his growing political influence over them, even as Russia goes to war. A group of his aristocratic enemies plot his murder.

== Cast ==
- Conrad Veidt as Grigori Rasputin
- Paul Otto as Czar Nikolaus II. Romanow
- Hermine Sterler as Czarina Alexandra
- Kenneth Rive as Czarewitch Alyosha
- Alexandra Sorina as Hofdame Wyrubowa
- Karl Ludwig Diehl as Prince Jussupoff
- Ida Perry as Count Ignatieff
- Charlotte Ander as Musja Suschkowa
- Elza Temary as Nina, the spy
- Brigitte Horney as Lusha
- Bernhard Goetzke as Lusha's father - builder
- Franziska Kinz as Dunya
- Marian Chevalier as aristocrat
- Heinrich Heilinger as Petroff - Government Official
- Edith Meinhard as Petroff's wife
- Magnus Stifter as Bischof von Tobolsk
- Ernst Reicher as Home Secretary
- Werner Hollmann as Chief of Police
- Theo Shall as Lieutenant Suschkoff
- Friedrich Gnaß as Derewenko
- Paul Henckels as Pureschkewich - representative
- Alexander Murski as Wachtmeister

== Bibliography ==
- Klaus, Ulrich J. Deutsche Tonfilme: Jahrgang 1932. Klaus-Archiv, 1988.
- Soister, John T. Conrad Veidt on Screen: A Comprehensive Illustrated Filmography. McFarland, 2002.
