= Gustav Althoff =

German film producer (1885–1948)

- Born: 2 January 1885; Minden, German Empire
- Died: 24 November 1948 (aged 63); Baden-Baden, Allied-occupied Germany
- Occupation: Producer
- Years active: 1920–1943 (film)

Gustav Althoff (1885–1948) was a German film producer. He was a leading independent producer during the Weimar and Nazi eras, establishing his own Althoff Studios in Berlin in 1939.

Originally a cinema-owner in Dortmund before expanding into film distribution, he moved to Berlin in 1920. He founded both his own Aco-Film company, and also co-founded Aafa-Film. He continued producing until the Nazi Party centralised all film production in the early 1940s.

== Selected filmography ==
- Wallenstein (1925)
- The Old Ballroom (1925)
- Ash Wednesday (1925)
- The Lorelei (1927)
- Autumn on the Rhine (1928)
- Today I Was With Frieda (1928)
- The Lady from Argentina (1928)
- I Once Had a Beautiful Homeland (1928)
- Beware of Loose Women (1929)
- The Customs Judge (1929)
- The Lord of the Tax Office (1929)
- Distinguishing Features (1929)
- Yes, Yes, Women Are My Weakness (1929)
- Youthful Indiscretion (1929)
- Lux, King of Criminals (1929)
- The Youths (1929)
- The Gypsy Chief (1929)
- Crucified Girl (1929)
- Busy Girls (1930)
- The Man in the Dark (1930)
- The Rhineland Girl (1930)
- Ash Wednesday (1931)
- Without Meyer, No Celebration is Complete (1931)
- Duty is Duty (1931)
- Annemarie, the Bride of the Company (1932)
- Gretel Wins First Prize (1933)
- The Sandwich Girl (1933)
- Back in the Country (1936)
- The Vagabonds (1937)
- Monika (1938)
- Clarissa (1941)
- Alarm (1941)
- With the Eyes of a Woman (1942)

== Bibliography ==
- Prawer, S.S. Between Two Worlds: The Jewish Presence in German and Austrian Film, 1910-1933. Berghahn Books, 2007.
