= Witnesses Wanted =

1930 film

- Directed by: Edmund Heuberger
- Written by: Oskar Schubert-Stevens
- Produced by: Joe Pasternak
- Starring: Eddie Polo; Lotte Stein; Kurt Brenkendorf
- Cinematography: Charles J. Stumar
- Production company: Aco-Film
- Distributed by: Deutsche Universal-Film
- Release date: 9 May 1930
- Country: Germany
- Languages: Silent; German intertitles

Witnesses Wanted (German: Zeugen gesucht) is a 1930 German silent mystery film directed by Edmund Heuberger and starring Eddie Polo, Lotte Stein and Kurt Brenkendorf.

The film's sets were designed by the art directors Gustav A. Knauer and Willy Schiller. It was released by the German branch of Universal Pictures.

== Cast ==
- Eddie Polo as Eddie Polo
- Hedy Waldow as Lotte
- Kurt Brenkendorf as Sandersen - Juwelier
- Leopold von Ledebur as Kommissar
- Lotte Stein as Besitzerin einer Plätterei
- Marion Gerth as Käthe
- Max Maximilian as Paul Görner
- Rudolf Lettinger as Fred Hiller
- Willy Clever as Hans Oldenroth

== Bibliography ==
- Erika Wottrich. Deutsche Universal.: Transatlantische Verleih- und Produktionsstrategien eines Hollywood-Studios in den 20er und 30er Jahren. 2001.
