= Willy Schiller =

German art director

- Born: 11 August 1899; Berlin, German Empire
- Died: 17 July 1973 (aged 73); Potsdam-Babelsberg, East Germany
- Occupation: Art director
- Years active: 1927–1965 (film)

Willy Schiller (11 August 1899 – 17 July 1973) was a German art director. In the later part of his career he worked for DEFA, the East German state-controlled film studio.

== Selected filmography ==
- Radio Magic (1927)
- The Green Alley (1928)
- Don Juan in a Girls' School (1928)
- The Lady from Argentina (1928)
- Love in the Cowshed (1928)
- Only a Viennese Woman Kisses Like That (1928)
- The Night of Terror (1929)
- The Hound of the Baskervilles (1929)
- The Youths (1929)
- Distinguishing Features (1929)
- Yes, Yes, Women Are My Weakness (1929)
- Youthful Indiscretion (1929)
- Beware of Loose Women (1929)
- Secret Police (1929)
- The Woman Everyone Loves Is You (1929)
- The Daredevil Reporter (1929)
- From a Bachelor's Diary (1929)
- German Wine (1929)
- A Mother's Love (1929)
- Busy Girls (1930)
- Witnesses Wanted (1930)
- Man schenkt sich Rosen, wenn man verliebt ist (1930)
- Pariser Unterwelt (1930)
- Rag Ball (1930)
- The Man in the Dark (1930)
- Next, Please! (1930)
- Of Life and Death (1930)
- The Love Market (1930)
- Two People (1930)
- A Waltz by Strauss (1931)
- The Adventurer of Tunis (1931)
- Raid in St. Pauli (1932)
- Little Man, What Now? (1933)
- The Country Schoolmaster (1933)
- What Women Dream (1933)
- Ich sing' mich in dein Herz hinein (1934)
- Love, Death and the Devil (1934)
- The Devil in the Bottle (1935)
- Make Me Happy (1935)
- Les époux célibataires (1935)
- The Green Domino (1935)
- The Green Domino (1935)
- Boccaccio (1936)
- Donogoo Tonka (1936)
- Donogoo (1936)
- City of Anatol (1936)
- The Kreutzer Sonata (1937)
- Wells in Flames (1937)
- The Chief Witness (1937)
- The Strange Monsieur Victor (1938)
- A Girl Goes Ashore (1938)
- Les nuits blanches de Saint-Pétersbourg (1938)
- Frau Sylvelin (1938)
- Drei Unteroffiziere (1939)
- Her First Experience (1939)
- Who's Kissing Madeleine? (1939)
- Small Town Poet (1940)
- Liebesschule (1940)
- With the Eyes of a Woman (1942)
- The Big Number (1943)
- Kohlhiesel's Daughters (1943)
- Meine vier Jungens (1944)
- The Years Pass (1945)
- Hoegler's Mission (1950)
- Zugverkehr unregelmäßig (1951)
- The Sonnenbrucks (1951)
- Karriere in Paris (1952)
- Swings or Roundabouts (1953)
- Alarm at the Circus (1954)
- Genesung (1956)
- Polonia-Express (1957)
- Skimeister von morgen (1957)
- Der kleine Kuno (1959)
- Steinzeitballade (1961)

== Bibliography ==
- Seán Allan & John Sandford. DEFA: East German Cinema, 1946-1992. Berghahn Books, 1999.
