= Otto Reinwald =

German actor

- Born: 23 August 1899; Konstanz, Baden-Württemberg, German Empire
- Died: 1 July 1968 (aged 68); Munich, Bavaria, West Germany
- Occupations: Actor, Production manager
- Years active: 1913–1965 (film)

Otto Reinwald (23 August 1899 – 1 July 1968) was a German film actor. The elder brother of the actresses Grete Reinwald and Hanni Reinwald, he made his screen debut in 1913 as a child actor. He later became a production manager, active in the post-war German film industry. He was also credited as a cinematographer for the 1959 film Hunting Party.

== Selected filmography ==
=== Actor ===
- The Mysterious X (1914)
- The Silent Mill (1914)
- Rosenmontag (1924)
- Nanon (1924)
- Father Voss (1925)
- The Old Ballroom (1925)
- The Circus Princess (1925)
- Anne-Liese of Dessau (1925)
- Joyless Street (1925)
- Oh Those Glorious Old Student Days (1925)
- The Iron Bride (1925)
- Two Under the Stars (1927)
- Today I Was With Frieda (1928)
- Autumn on the Rhine (1928)
- Misled Youth (1929)
- There Was Once a Loyal Hussar (1929)
- The Youths (1929)
- Only on the Rhine (1930)
- Marriage in Name Only (1930)
- Alarm at Midnight (1931)
- Operation Edelweiss (1954)

=== Production manager ===
- Das war mein Leben (1944)
- The Original Sin (1948)
- The Time with You (1948)
- Hello, Fraulein! (1949)
- Tromba (1949)
- Einmaleins der Ehe (1949)
- Kein Engel ist so rein (1950)
- Two in One Suit (1950)
- Hanna Amon (1951)
- The Bachelor Trap (1953)
- Ave Maria(1953)
- The Night Without Morals (1953)

== Bibliography ==
- Eisner, Lotte H. The Haunted Screen: Expressionism in the German Cinema and the Influence of Max Reinhardt. University of California Press, 2008.
