= Only a Viennese Woman Kisses Like That =

1928 film

- Directed by: Arthur Bergen
- Written by: Thilde Förster
- Starring: Werner Fuetterer; Erna Morena
- Cinematography: Károly Vass
- Music by: Hans May
- Production company: Münchner Lichtspielkunst
- Distributed by: Bavaria Film
- Release date: 12 January 1928
- Country: Germany
- Languages: Silent; German intertitles

Only a Viennese Woman Kisses Like That (German: So küsst nur eine Wienerin) is a 1928 German silent film directed by Arthur Bergen and starring Werner Fuetterer, Grete Graal, and Erna Morena.

It was made at the Emelka Studios in Munich. The film's sets were designed by the art directors Gustav A. Knauer and Willy Schiller.

== Cast ==
- Werner Fuetterer as Der Anton
- Grete Graal as Die Mizzi
- Erna Morena as Die Marchesa
- Evi Eva as Die Miß
- Georg John as Der Manager
- Paul Otto as Der Baron
- Lotte Stein as Die Trude
- Teddy Bill as Der Bäcker
- Carl Auen as Der 'Ober'
- John Mylong as Der 'schwarze Maxl'
- Gyula Szőreghy as Der Agent
- Oreste Bilancia as Der Herr

== Bibliography ==
- Kasten, Jürgen; Bruns, Brigitte (2005). Erna Morena. Munich: Belleville. ISBN 978-3-936298-52-9.
