= Busy Girls =

1930 film directed by Erich Schönfelder

- German film poster
- Directed by: Erich Schönfelder
- Written by: Herbert Juttke; Georg C. Klaren
- Produced by: Gustav Althoff
- Starring: Lien Deyers; Ivan Koval-Samborsky; Elza Temary
- Cinematography: Charles J. Stumar
- Production company: Aco-Film
- Distributed by: Messtro-Orplid
- Release date: January 1930
- Country: Germany
- Languages: Silent; German intertitles

Busy Girls (German: Gehetzte Mädchen) is a 1930 German silent drama film directed by Erich Schönfelder and starring Lien Deyers, Ivan Koval-Samborsky and Elza Temary.

The film's sets were designed by the art directors Gustav A. Knauer and Willy Schiller. Made in 1929 and released at the beginning of 1930, it was in the tail-end of the silent era which was rapidly drawing to a close due to the arrival of sound.

== Cast ==
- Lien Deyers
- Ivan Koval-Samborsky
- Elza Temary
- Toni Tetzlaff
- Aruth Wartan
- Raimondo Van Riel
- Olga Limburg
- Robert Garrison
