= Two People (1930 film) =

German historical drama film

- Directed by: Erich Waschneck
- Written by: Richard Voss (novel); Alfred Schirokauer; Hans H. Zerlett
- Produced by: Joe Pasternak
- Starring: Charlotte Susa; Gustav Fröhlich; Fritz Alberti
- Cinematography: Richard Angst; Mutz Greenbaum; Giovanni Vitrotti
- Music by: Karl M. May
- Production company: Cicero Film
- Distributed by: Deutsche Universal-Film
- Release date: 22 December 1930
- Running time: 108 minutes
- Country: Germany
- Language: German

Two People (German: Zwei Menschen) is a 1930 German historical drama film directed by Erich Waschneck and starring Charlotte Susa, Gustav Fröhlich and Fritz Alberti.

The film was distributed by the German subsidiary of Universal Pictures. It is adapted from 1911 novel of the same title by Richard Voss. It has been filmed in Germany on two other occasions a 1924 silent Two People by Hanns Schwarz and a 1952 sound film Two People by Paul May.

The film's sets were designed by the art directors Leopold Blonder and Willy Schiller. It was partly shot on location in Italy.

== Plot ==
Junker Rochus and Judith Platter are in love. Rochus' mother, a domineering religious fanatic, wants him to break off the relationship and become a priest, but he is reluctant to do so. The mother swears that he will take up orders, but when he does not follow through she dies of grief. Feeling guilty, Rochus reluctantly abandons his romance with Judith and enters the priesthood. Judith commits suicide, and Rochus finds that he must preside at her funeral.

== Cast ==
- Charlotte Susa as Judith Platter
- Gustav Fröhlich as Junker Rochus
- Friedrich Kayßler as Der Kardinal
- Fritz Alberti as Graf Enna
- Hermine Sterler as Gräfin Enna
- Karl Platen as Der Diener Florian
- Bernd Aldor as Hauskaplan
- Harry Nestor as Der Jungknecht Martin
- Lucie Englisch as Die Jungmagd Josepha
- Theodor Loos as Ein Prior
- Friedrich Ettel as Der Prior vom Kloster Neustift

== Bibliography ==
- Goble, Alan. The Complete Index to Literary Sources in Film. Walter de Gruyter, 1999.
