= A Tremendously Rich Man =

1932 film

- Directed by: Steve Sekely
- Written by: Eugen Szatmari; Ernst Wolff
- Produced by: Joe Pasternak
- Starring: Curt Bois; Dolly Haas; Adele Sandrock
- Cinematography: Reimar Kuntze
- Edited by: Andrew Marton
- Music by: Max Kolpé; Theo Mackeben
- Production companies: Deutsche Universal; Tobis Film
- Distributed by: Deutsche Universal
- Release date: 13 February 1932
- Running time: 73 minutes
- Country: Germany
- Language: German

A Tremendously Rich Man (German: Ein steinreicher Mann) is a 1932 German comedy film directed by Steve Sekely and starring Curt Bois, Dolly Haas and Adele Sandrock. It premiered on 13 February 1932. The film was a co-production between the German subsidiary of Universal Pictures and the German firm Tobis Film. It was shot at the Johannisthal Studios in Berlin. The film's sets were designed by the art directors Carl Böhm and Erich Czerwonski.

== Synopsis ==
After he accidentally swallows a very valuable diamond, a jeweler's assistant is pursued by a variety of people including criminals. With the assistance of his girlfriend Dolly he manages to evade them.

== Cast ==
- Curt Bois as Curt
- Dolly Haas as Dolly
- Adele Sandrock as Adele
- Liselotte Schaak as Ulla
- Egon Brosig as Fürst
- Fritz Ley as Notar
- Paul Hörbiger as Linkerton
- Willi Schur as Emil
- Paul Biensfeldt as Ferdinand
- Margarete Kupfer as Bella da Vasco
- Friedrich Ettel as Arzt
- Annie Ann
- Eduard Rothauser
- Josef Dahmen
- Peter Ihle
- Hermann Picha
- Hermann Pittschau
- Walter Steinbeck
- Michael von Newlinsky

== Bibliography ==
- Grange, William. Cultural Chronicle of the Weimar Republic. Scarecrow Press, 2008.
- Klaus, Ulrich J. Deutsche Tonfilme: Jahrgang 1932. Klaus-Archiv, 1988.
