= The Man in the Dark =

1930 film

- Directed by: Edmund Heuberger
- Written by: Edmund Heuberger
- Produced by: Gustav Althoff
- Starring: Carl Auen; Edith Meinhard; Siegfried Berisch
- Cinematography: Emil Schünemann
- Production company: Albö-Film
- Distributed by: Albö-Film
- Release date: 14 February 1930
- Country: Germany
- Languages: Silent; German intertitles

The Man in the Dark (German: Der Mann im Dunkel) is a 1930 German thriller film directed by Edmund Heuberger and starring Carl Auen, Edith Meinhard, and Siegfried Berisch. It was made as the sequel to the 1929 film Lux, King of Criminals.

The film's sets were designed by the art director Gustav A. Knauer and Willy Schiller.

== Cast ==
- Carl Auen as Lux, König der Abenteurer
- Edith Meinhard as Lou
- Siegfried Berisch as Jacques Davert, Chefredakteur
- Julius Falkenstein as Montedore, Besitzer der Zeitung "Der Globus"
- Leopold von Ledebur as Minister Morand
- Kurt Brenkendorf as Peril
- Willy Clever as Erneste, Morands Sohn
- Harry Nestor as Ein Schieber
- Julius Rogg as Fouche, Detektiv
- Carola Verdi as Adrienne
- Aruth Wartan as Ein Kriminalkommissar

== Bibliography ==
- Krautz, Alfred (1984). International Directory of Cinematographers, Set- and Costume Designers in Film. Vol. 4. Munich: Saur. ISBN 978-3-598-21434-9.
