= Love in the Cowshed =

1928 film directed by Carl Froelich

- German film poster
- German: Liebe im Kuhstall
- Directed by: Carl Froelich
- Written by: Fritz Friedmann-Frederich; Walter Supper
- Produced by: Carl Froelich; Henny Porten; Wilhelm von Kaufmann
- Starring: Henny Porten; Toni Tetzlaff; Eugen Neufeld
- Cinematography: Gustave Preiss
- Music by: Werner Schmidt-Boelcke
- Production company: Henny Porten-Froelich-Produktion
- Distributed by: Deutsche Universal-Film
- Release date: 20 October 1928
- Running time: 85 minutes
- Country: Germany
- Languages: Silent; German intertitles

Love in the Cowshed (German: Liebe im Kuhstall) is a 1928 German silent drama film directed by Carl Froelich and starring Henny Porten, Toni Tetzlaff and Eugen Neufeld. The film's art direction was by Gustav A. Knauer and Willy Schiller. It was distributed by the German branch of Universal Pictures.

== Cast ==
- Henny Porten as Marischka
- Toni Tetzlaff as Countess Koritowska, her mother
- Eugen Neufeld as Albrecht, Knight of Holodronz
- Ivan Koval-Samborsky as Janos, nephew
- Wolf von Beneckendorff as Herzog Leopold Maria
- Hadrian Maria Netto as Von Palleske, Rittmeister a.D.
- Oskar Karlweis as Wedelski, first lieutenant a.D.
- Otto Wallburg as Wenzel, soap cutter
- Felix Bressart as bailiff
- Helga Klein as waitress
- Anton Pointner
