= Triumph of Love (1929 film) =

1929 film

- Directed by: William Dieterle
- Written by: Charlotte Hagenbruch; Alfred Polgar
- Produced by: Joe Pasternak
- Starring: Dieterle; Lien Deyers; Olaf Fønss
- Cinematography: Charles J. Stumar
- Production company: Deutsche Universal-Film
- Distributed by: Deutsche Universal-Film
- Release date: 2 September 1929
- Running time: 108 minutes
- Country: Germany
- Languages: Silent; German intertitles

Triumph of Love (German: Ich lebe für Dich (lit. I live for you)) is a 1929 German silent drama film directed by William Dieterle and starring Dieterle, Lien Deyers and Olaf Fønss. It was made by the German branch of Universal Pictures and shot at the Tempelhof Studios in Berlin and on location in Arosa in Switzerland and the Spree Forest in Brandenburg. The film's art direction was by Alfred Junge and Max Knaake.

== Cast ==
- William Dieterle as Bergson
- Lien Deyers as Nicoline
- Olaf Fønss as Fürst Wronsky
- Erna Morena as Fürstin Wronsky
- Hubert von Meyerinck as Flemming

== Bibliography ==
- Hans-Michael Bock and Tim Bergfelder. The Concise Cinegraph: An Encyclopedia of German Cinema. Berghahn Books.
