= The Brandenburg Arch =

1929 film

- Directed by: Max Knaake; William Dieterle
- Produced by: Paul Kohner; Joe Pasternak
- Starring: Paul Henckels; June Marlowe; Aribert Mog
- Cinematography: Charles J. Stumar
- Production company: Deutsche Universal-Film
- Distributed by: Deutsche Universal-Film
- Release date: 22 May 1929
- Running time: 100 minutes
- Country: Germany
- Languages: Silent; German intertitles

The Brandenburg Arch (German: Durchs Brandenburger Tor) is a 1929 German silent drama film directed by Max Knaake and William Dieterle and starring Paul Henckels, June Marlowe and Aribert Mog. It was made by the German branch of Universal Pictures.

The film's sets were designed by the art directors Max Knaake and Fritz Maurischat.

== Cast ==
- Paul Henckels as Lehmann, Schuhmacher
- June Marlowe as Frieda, seine Tochter
- Aribert Mog as Fritz
- Fritz Kampers as Franz Müller
- Karl Etlinger as Emil Lauter
- Carl Balhaus as Max
- Fred Grosser as Max
- Bruno Ziener as Professor Berghaus
- Inge Borg as Lilly, seine Tochter
- Anton Pointner as Orje Bollmann

== Bibliography ==
- Bock, Hans-Michael; Bergfelder, Tim, eds. (2009). The Concise Cinegraph: Encyclopaedia of German Cinema. New York: Berghahn Books. ISBN 978-1-57181-655-9.
