= Hans Heinrich von Twardowski =

German actor (1898–1958)

- Born: 5 May 1898; Stettin, Pomerania, German Empire
- Died: 19 November 1958 (aged 60); New York City, U.S.
- Occupation: Actor
- Years active: 1920–1944
- Partner: Martin Kosleck (early 1930s – 1958 (his death))

Hans Heinrich von Twardowski (5 May 1898 – 19 November 1958) was a German film actor.

== Career ==
=== In Germany ===
Twardowski was born in Stettin, Germany (now Szczecin in Poland). He made his first film appearance in the 1920 Robert Wiene-directed horror movie Das Cabinet des Dr. Caligari (The Cabinet of Dr. Caligari) which starred Conrad Veidt, Werner Krauss and Lil Dagover. He would go on to appear in over 20 movies in Weimar Germany during the 1920s. In 1921, Twardowski portrayed Joshua Nesbitt, Lord Horatio Nelson's stepson, in the German silent Lady Hamilton. Twardowski appeared in Der Falsche Dimitri and Es leuchtet meine Liebe the following year.

In 1927, Twardowski appeared in Die Weber (The Weavers) about man fighting against machines. The following year, he appeared in the Fritz Lang thriller Spione (Spies). A year later, he portrayed Otto von Wittelsbach, younger brother of Mad King Ludwig II, in Ludwig der Zweite, König von Bayern (Ludwig II, King of Bavaria). His first sound movie was Der König von Paris (The King of Paris) in 1930. His last movie in Germany was 1931's Der Herzog von Reichstadt.

=== In Hollywood ===
Twardowski, a homosexual, left Germany shortly before the Nazi regime took power. Afterwards, he appeared in the 1932 drama Scandal for Sale starring Pat O'Brien. In 1933; he played Von Bergen in the war drama Private Jones, a prince in Adorable and a lawyer in The Devil's in Love.

The following year, Twardowski played Ivan Shuvalov in The Scarlet Empress. In 1935, Twardowski appeared as Count Nicholas of Hungary in the Cecil B. DeMille film The Crusades starring Loretta Young. It would be two years before Twardowski appeared in another movie and that was a small part in the romance Thin Ice starring Sonja Henie and Tyrone Power. Because of the time he spent directing and appearing in plays on stage, it would be another two years before he worked in another movie.

In 1939, Twardowski's career picked up as he appeared in two Warner Bros.' anti-Nazi movies. He played Max Helldorf in the thriller Confessions of a Nazi Spy. Twardowski then appeared in another thriller Espionage Agent starring Joel McCrea, which was released just three weeks after Germany invaded Poland.

Later in 1939, Twardowski appeared in the highly controversial anti-Nazi movie Hitler - Beast of Berlin. Twardowski played Albert Stahlhelm, a Stormtrooper of the Waffen-SS, who becomes disillusioned with the brutality of the Nazi regime. His character accidentally betrays his anti-Nazi friends to his fellow SS members, who murder him in retaliation.

With the outbreak of World War II and the subsequent increase in war movies, Twardowski had several uncredited roles as Nazis. He portrayed storm troopers, U-boat captains, and army officers. He appeared in seven films in 1942, including a large role as Captain Gemmler in the Nazi spy thriller Dawn Express. He next played an uncredited role as a sergeant in The Pied Piper starring Monty Woolley as an Englishman trying to get out of German-occupied France with a group of children. He also appeared in the comedy Joan of Ozark. Twardowski appeared as a German soldier in Desperate Journey with Errol Flynn and Ronald Reagan. He received a bit part as a U-boat captain in RKO's The Navy Comes Through starring Pat O'Brien. He had another big part in the comedy Once Upon a Honeymoon starring Cary Grant and Ginger Rogers.

In 1942, Twardowski, appeared in a small role in Casablanca playing a German officer. In 1943, Twardowski appeared in Lang's Hangmen Also Die!, portraying the notorious Nazi SS Commandant Reinhard Heydrich. All of his lines in this movie were in German.

Twardowski played a German officer in Raoul Walsh's Background to Danger starring George Raft, Sydney Greenstreet and Peter Lorre. This was followed by a bit part as a Nazi captain in the war drama First Comes Courage. Twardowski appeared in The Strange Death of Adolf Hitler. Later that year, he had a small part in the war drama The Cross of Lorraine starring Gene Kelly, Cedric Hardwicke and Lorre.

Twardowski's last two movies were 1944 war dramas; first he appeared as a doctor in The Hitler Gang and later as a German Red Cross representative in Resisting Enemy Interrogation.

=== In theatre ===
Twardowski's movie career ended along with World War II. However, he continued to write and direct plays. He originally starred on stage as the Dauphin in Schiller's productions of Die Jungfrau von Orleans. In the 1930s, Twardowski directed and appeared in the stage productions of The Brothers Karamazov and Old Heidelberg in the Pasadena Playhouse. In 1939, he wrote and produced a play in Brooklyn's St. Felix Street Playhouse titled Shakespeare Merchant - 1939, based on Shakespeare's The Merchant of Venice. Twardowski also sang tenor in a number of musicals.

After his retirement from movies, Twardowski worked again as a stage actor.

== Personal life ==
Twardowski was in a relationship with fellow German actor Martin Kosleck from the early 1930s until his death. He was a close friend of Marlene Dietrich.

== Death ==
Twardowski died from a heart attack in New York City on 19 November 1958 at age 60.

== Selected filmography ==
- Unheimliche Geschichten (1919) - Restaurant Waiter (2nd story) (uncredited)
- From Morn to Midnight (1920) - Sohn der Dame
- Baccarat (1919)
- Gerechtigkeit (1920)
- The Cabinet of Dr. Caligari (1920) - Alan
- Genuine (1920) - Florian
- The Night of Queen Isabeau (1920) - Page
- The House on the Moon (1921)
- Am Webstuhl der Zeit (1921) - Fanatiker
- The Rats (1921)
- Lady Hamilton (1921) - Joshua Nesbitt, Nelsons Stiefsohn
- Marizza (1922) - Antonino
- Tingeltangel (1922) - Frank
- Phantom (1922) - Hugo Lubota
- Es leuchtet meine Liebe (1922) - Lucien, Herzog von Eramont
- The False Dimitri (1922)
- Tabitha, Stand Up (1922)
- Lola Montez, the King's Dancer (1922) - Studiosus Friedemann
- I.N.R.I. (1923) - Johannes
- Leap Into Life (1924) - Geiger
- The Enchantress (1924)
- The Fire Dancer (1925) - Bartos, sein Freund
- Herbstmanöver (1926)
- Fadette (1926)
- The Weavers (1927) - Gottfried Hilse, sein Sohn
- Arme kleine Sif (1927)
- Die heilige Lüge (1927) - Janus
- Night of Mystery (1927)
- The False Prince (1927) - Wolf, sein Freund
- Die Hölle der Jungfrauen (1928) - Franek
- Spies (1928) - Vincent - Jason's Secretary (uncredited)
- Sex in Chains (1928) - Alfred
- I Kiss Your Hand, Madame (1929) - Waiter (uncredited)
- Peter the Mariner (1929) - Adolf Angel
- Ludwig II, King of Bavaria (1930) - Otto von Wittelsbach
- The King of Paris (1930)
- The Singing City (1930) - Willi von Wellheim - Claires Verehrer
- The Sacred Flame (1931)
- Men Behind Bars (1931) - Oliver
- Der Herzog von Reichstadt (1931)
- Scandal for Sale (1932) - Affner - the Pilot
- Six Hours to Live (1932) - Flosky (uncredited)
- Private Jones (1933) - Von Bergen (uncredited)
- Adorable (1933) - The Prince of Pontevedro
- The Devil's in Love (1933) - Andre's Defense Counsel (uncredited)
- The Scarlet Empress (1934) - Ivan Shuvolov
- Storm Over the Andes (1935) - Oberto
- The Crusades (1935) - Nicholas - Count of Hungary
- Alas sobre El Chaco (1935) - Oberto
- Thin Ice (1937) - Baron's Secretary (uncredited)
- Confessions of a Nazi Spy (1939) - Helldorf
- Espionage Agent (1939) - Dr. Helm
- Hitler - Beast of Berlin (1939) - Albert Stalhelm - Storm Trooper
- The Dawn Express (1942) - Capt. Gemmler
- The Pied Piper (1942) - Sergeant (uncredited)
- Joan of Ozark (1942) - Hans
- Enemy Agents Meet Ellery Queen (1942) - Capt. Earhardt (uncredited)
- Desperate Journey (1942) - German Soldier (uncredited)
- The Navy Comes Through (1942) - U-boat Captain (uncredited)
- Once Upon a Honeymoon (1942) - German Officer (uncredited)
- Casablanca (1942) - German Officer with Yvonne (uncredited)
- Margin for Error (1943) - Fritz - Butler (uncredited)
- Hangmen Also Die! (1943) - Reinhard Heydrich
- Hitler's Madman (1943) - Lt. Buelow (uncredited)
- Background to Danger (1943) - German Officer (uncredited)
- First Comes Courage (1943) - Nazi Captain (uncredited)
- The Strange Death of Adolf Hitler (1943) - Judge
- The Cross of Lorraine (1943) - German Officer in Car (uncredited)
- Passage to Marseille (1944) - French Airfield Radio Man (uncredited)
- The Hitler Gang (1944) - Department Doctor (uncredited)
- Resisting Enemy Interrogation (1944) - Herr Mahler - German Red Cross Representative (uncredited)
