= Fritz Wenneis =

- Born: 30 September 1889; Mannheim, Grand Duchy of Baden, German Empire
- Died: 4 July 1969 (aged 79); Garmisch-Partenkirchen, Bavaria, West Germany
- Occupation: Composer
- Years active: 1929–1958 (film)

Fritz Wenneis (1889–1969) was a German composer. He worked on more than fifty film scores.

== Selected filmography ==
- A Storm Over Zakopane (1931)
- Bobby Gets Going (1931)
- Shadows of the Underworld (1931)
- Johnny Steals Europe (1932)
- Ship Without a Harbour (1932)
- Secret Agent (1932)
- Rasputin, Demon with Women (1932)
- Jumping Into the Abyss (1933)
- Master of the World (1934)
- Artisten (1934)
- The World Without a Mask (1934)
- The Lost Valley (1934)
- The Sporck Battalion (1934)
- The Red Rider (1935)
- The Bird Seller (1935)
- The Schimeck Family (1935)
- The Call of the Jungle (1936)
- Orders Are Orders (1936)
- His Best Friend (1937)
- Men, Animals and Sensations (1938)
- The Right to Love (1939)
- The Tiger Akbar (1951)
- Border Post 58 (1951)
- Elephant Fury (1953)
- A Woman of Today (1954)

== Bibliography ==
- Giesen, Rolf. Nazi Propaganda Films: A History and Filmography. McFarland & Company, 2003.
