= Secret Agent (1932 film) =

1932 film directed by Harry Piel

- Directed by: Harry Piel
- Written by: Werner Scheff; Harry Piel
- Produced by: Joe Pasternak; Harry Piel
- Starring: Harry Piel; Maria Matray; Eduard von Winterstein
- Cinematography: Ewald Daub
- Edited by: René Métain
- Music by: Fritz Wenneis
- Production company: Ariel-Film
- Distributed by: Deutsche Universal-Film
- Release date: 18 February 1932
- Running time: 93 minutes
- Country: Germany
- Language: German

Secret Agent (German: Der Geheimagent) is a 1932 German thriller film directed by and starring Harry Piel and also featuring Maria Matray, Eduard von Winterstein and Leonard Steckel. It was shot at the Staaken and Grunewald Studios in Berlin. The film's sets were designed by the art director Gustav A. Knauer. It was distributed by the German branch of Universal Pictures.

== Synopsis ==
A chemist has developed a deadly new poison gas that could wipe out humanity. Adventurer Harry Parker sets out to get his hands on the formula and destroy it.

== Cast ==
- Harry Piel as Harry Parker
- Maria Matray as Ruth Managan
- Eduard von Winterstein as Professor Managan
- Leonard Steckel as Oberst Salit
- Reinhold Bernt as Baschin
- Ferdinand Hart as Brandes
- Ferdinand von Alten as Minister
- Kurt Mühlhardt as Sänger
- Wilhelm Diegelmann
- Erich Dunskus
- Gerhard Dammann
- Leopold von Ledebur
- Paul Moleska
- Charly Berger
- Hans Wallner

== Bibliography ==
- DeCelles, Naomi. Recollecting Lotte Eisner: Cinema, Exile, and the Archive. University of California Press, 2022.
- Klaus, Ulrich J. Deutsche Tonfilme: Jahrgang 1932. Klaus-Archiv, 1988. ISBN 978-3-927352-07-0.
