= Next, Please! =

1930 film directed by Erich Schönfelder

- German: Der Nächste, bitte!
- Directed by: Erich Schönfelder
- Written by: Fritz Falkenstein; Steve Sekely; Walter Wassermann
- Produced by: Joe Pasternak
- Starring: Charles Puffy; Adele Sandrock; Albert Paulig
- Cinematography: Charles J. Stumar
- Production company: Aco-Film
- Distributed by: Deutsche Universal-Film
- Release date: 3 June 1930
- Country: Germany
- Languages: Silent; German intertitles

Next, Please! (German: Der Nächste, bitte!) is a 1930 German comedy film directed by Erich Schönfelder and starring Charles Puffy, Adele Sandrock, and Albert Paulig.

The film's sets were designed by the art directors Gustav A. Knauer and Willy Schiller. It was released by the German branch of Universal Pictures.

== Cast ==
- Charles Puffy as Ludwig König
- Adele Sandrock as Tante Auguste
- Albert Paulig as Knorr von Bremshaus
- Lien Deyers as Minchen Bangigkeit
- Rolf von Goth as Hans
- Siegfried Berisch as Mäxchen
- Lotte Stein as Hulda Murmel
