= Charlotte Hagenbruch =

German actress and writer (1896–1968)

- Born: 27 March 1896; Chemnitz, Saxony, Germany
- Died: 20 May 1968 (aged 72); Grabs, St. Gallen, Switzerland
- Occupations: Actress, writer
- Years active: 1920–1931 (film)
- Spouse: William Dieterle

Charlotte Hagenbruch (1896–1968) was a German actress and writer. She was the wife of the actor-director William Dieterle with whom she worked on several films. She emigrated with him to the United States in the early 1930s and later returned to Europe after the Second World War.

== Selected filmography ==
- Tingeltangel (1922)
- The Tigress (1922)
- The Saint and Her Fool (1928)
- Triumph of Love (1929)
- Silence in the Forest (1929)
- Ludwig II, King of Bavaria (1929)
- Rustle of Spring (1929)
- The Sacred Flame (1931)
- The Mask Falls (1931)

== Bibliography ==
- Bock, Hans-Michael & Bergfelder, Tim. The Concise Cinegraph: Encyclopaedia of German Cinema. Berghahn Books, 2009.
