= The Lady from Argentina =

1928 film

- Hans Albers (right) in a scene from the film
- Directed by: Siegfried Philippi
- Written by: Siegfried Philippi
- Produced by: Gustav Althoff
- Starring: Hans Albers
- Cinematography: Max Grix
- Music by: Bernard Homola
- Production company: Albö-Film
- Distributed by: Albö-Film
- Release date: 9 April 1928
- Country: Germany
- Languages: Silent; German intertitles

The Lady from Argentina (German: Das Fräulein aus Argentinien) is a 1928 German silent film directed by Siegfried Philippi and starring Hans Albers.

The film's sets were designed by the art directors Gustav A. Knauer and Willy Schiller.

== Cast ==
In alphabetical order

- Hans Albers
- Gerd Briese
- Olga Engl
- Robert Garrison
- Gritta Ley
- Gerhard Ritterband
- Hermine Sterler
- Jakob Tiedtke
- Leopold von Ledebur

== Bibliography ==
- Parish, Robert. Film Actors Guide. Scarecrow Press, 1977.
