= Rag Ball =

1930 film

- Directed by: Carl Heinz Wolff
- Written by: Fritz Friedmann-Frederich; Franz Rauch
- Starring: Harry Frank; Irene Ambrus; Kurt Lilien
- Cinematography: Georg Muschner; Hans Karl Gottschalk
- Music by: Bernard Homola
- Production company: Carl Heinz Wolff-Filmproduktion
- Distributed by: Omnium-Film
- Release date: 19 August 1930
- Running time: 86 minutes
- Country: Germany
- Language: German

Rag Ball (German: Lumpenball) is a 1930 German comedy film directed by Carl Heinz Wolff and starring Harry Frank, Irene Ambrus, and Kurt Lilien. The title refers to a costume ball in which the guests turn up in tatters and rags.

The film's sets were designed by the art directors Gustav A. Knauer and Willy Schiller.

== Cast ==
- Harry Frank as Dr. Gerhard
- Irene Ambrus as Eva, seine Frau
- Kurt Lilien as Amadeus
- Anna Müller-Lincke as Pauline
- Carl de Vogt as Dr. Wiegand, Lawyer
- Fritz Kampers as Schluck
- Paul Kemp as Priem
- Georgia Lind as Fiffi, Tänzerin
- Annie Ann as Lola, TänzerinLola
- Karl Platen as Karl
- Wolf Georgi as Zyrillus Bummerstedt, Varieté-Direktor
- Karl Harbacher as Bühnenportier
- Magda Elgen
- Gerhard Dammann
- Otti Dietze
- Inge Larsen
- Georg John
- Ernst Pittschau

== Bibliography ==
- Bock, Hans-Michael; Bergfelder, Tim, eds. (2009). The Concise Cinegraph: Encyclopaedia of German Cinema. New York: Berghahn Books. ISBN 978-1-57181-655-9.
