= Kurt Brenkendorf =

German actor (1882–1944)

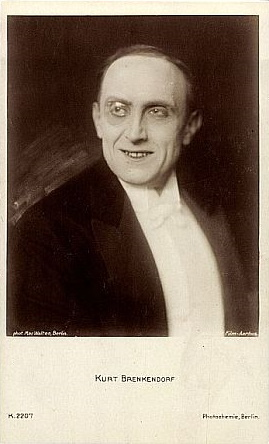
- Brenkendorf c. 1920
- Born: Benno Kurt Bockenheuser; 13 June 1882; Danzig, West Prussia, German Empire
- Died: 10 September 1944 (aged 62); Berlin, Germany
- Other name: Kurt Brenkerhoff
- Occupation: Actor
- Years active: 1903–1938

Kurt Brenkendorf (born Benno Kurt Bockenheuser; 13 June 1882 – 10 September 1944) was a German stage and film actor.

== Selected filmography ==
- The Mexican (1918)
- Victim of Society (1919)
- The Prisoner (1920)
- Deceiver of the People (1921)
- The Chain Clinks (1923)
- The Third Watch (1924)
- Gentleman on Time (1924)
- The Heart of Lilian Thorland (1924)
- Lord of the Night (1927)
- Panic (1928)
- The Gypsy Chief (1929)
- Tragedy of Youth (1929)
- The Customs Judge (1929)
- Secret Police (1929)
- Distinguishing Features (1929)
- Witnesses Wanted (1930)
- People in the Fire (1930)
- The Man in the Dark (1930)
- When Women Keep Silent (1937)

== Bibliography ==
- Grange, William. Cultural Chronicle of the Weimar Republic. Scarecrow Press, 2008.
