= The Uncle from Sumatra =

1930 film

- Directed by: Gyula Szöreghy
- Written by: Louis Taufstein (play)
- Starring: Wolf Albach-Retty; Mary Kid; Rina Marsa
- Production company: Listo Film
- Release date: 24 April 1930
- Country: Austria
- Languages: Silent; German intertitles

The Uncle from Sumatra (German: Der Onkel aus Sumatra) is a 1930 Austrian silent comedy film directed by Gyula Szöreghy and starring Wolf Albach-Retty, Mary Kid and Rina Marsa.

== Cast ==
- Gyula Szöreghy
- Wolf Albach-Retty
- Hans Unterkircher
- Eugen Guenther
- Rina Marsa
- Mary Kid
- Mizzi Griebl

== Bibliography ==
- Weniger, Kay. 'Es wird im Leben dir mehr genommen als gegeben ...' Lexikon der aus Deutschland und Österreich emigrierten Filmschaffenden 1933 bis 1945. ACABUS Verlag, 2011.
