= Radio Magic =

1927 film directed by Richard Oswald

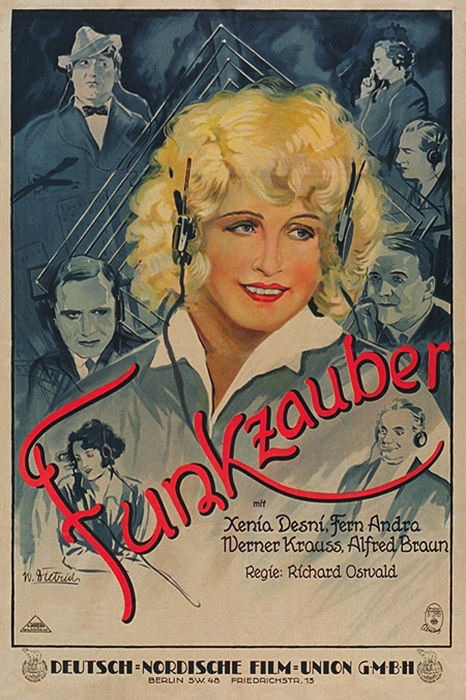
- Directed by: Richard Oswald
- Written by: Jane Bess; Paul Morgan; Nino Ottavi
- Produced by: Richard Oswald
- Starring: Werner Krauss; Xenia Desni; Fern Andra; Alfred Braun
- Cinematography: Axel Graatkjær
- Production company: Richard-Oswald-Produktion
- Distributed by: Deutsch-Nordische Film
- Release date: 30 September 1927
- Country: Germany
- Languages: Silent, German intertitles

Radio Magic (German: Funkzauber) is a 1927 German silent comedy film directed by Richard Oswald and starring Werner Krauss, Xenia Desni, and Fern Andra. The film's art direction was by Gustav A. Knauer and Willy Schiller. It premiered on 30 September 1927. The runtime is 60 minutes.

== Cast ==
- Werner Krauss as Theophil Schimmelpfenning, der Funkaugust
- Xenia Desni as Gerda Reiner, Stenotypistin
- Fern Andra as Melitta Mirabella, Seiltänzerin
- Alfred Braun as Sprecher des Berliner Rundfunks
- Margarete Kupfer as Frau Reiner
- Gerd Briese as George Lenz, Gerdas Bräutigam
- Anton Pointner as Herr Haßdorf, Erfinder
- Leo Peukert as Max Bügeleisen
- Ellen Plessow as Victoria Fadenschein, Bügeleisens Hausdame
- Fritz Kampers as Schupo

== Bibliography ==
- Grange, William (2008). Cultural Chronicle of the Weimar Republic. Lanham, MD: Scarecrow Press. ISBN 978-0-8108-5967-8.
- Weniger, Kay (2011). "Es wird im Leben dir mehr genommen als gegeben...": Lexikon der aus Deutschland und Österreich emigrierten Filmschaffenden 1933 bis 1945 (in German). Berlin: Acabus. ISBN 978-3-86282-049-8.
