= Otto Guelstorff =

German art director

- Born: 5 February 1878; Tilsit, East Prussia, German Empire
- Died: 3 July 1959 (aged 81); Berlin, Germany
- Other name: Otto Gülstorff
- Occupation: Art director
- Years active: 1926-1948 (film & TV)

Otto Guelstorff (1878–1959) was a German art director. He worked on around fifty films during his career.

== Selected filmography ==
- Hell of Love (1926)
- Silence in the Forest (1929)
- Rustle of Spring (1929)
- Heilige oder Dirne (1929)
- For Once I'd Like to Have No Troubles (1932)
- Adventure on the Southern Express (1934)
- Love and the First Railway (1934)
- All Because of the Dog (1935)
- Punks Arrives from America (1935)
- Pillars of Society (1935)
- Stronger Than Regulations (1936)
- Back in the Country (1936)
- The Glass Ball (1937)
- Der singende Tor (1939)
- The Master of the Estate (1943)
- 1-2-3 Corona (1948)

== Bibliography ==
- Fox, Jo. Film propaganda in Britain and Nazi Germany: World War II Cinema. Berg, 2007.
