= Bobby Gets Going =

1931 film

- Directed by: Harry Piel
- Written by: Henrik Galeen; Edmund Heuberger; Hans Rameau
- Based on: Bobby erwacht by Georg Mühlen-Schulte
- Produced by: Joe Pasternak; Harry Piel
- Starring: Harry Piel; Annie Markart; Hilde Hildebrand
- Cinematography: Ewald Daub
- Edited by: René Métain
- Music by: Fritz Wenneis
- Production company: Ariel-Film
- Distributed by: Deutsche Universal-Film
- Release date: 3 December 1931
- Running time: 95 minutes
- Country: Germany
- Language: German

Bobby Gets Going (German: Bobby geht los) is a 1931 German comedy action film directed by and starring Harry Piel and also featuring Annie Markart, Hilde Hildebrand and Kurt Lilien. It was shot at the EFA Studios in Halensee and on location around Berlin including at the Sportpalast. The film's sets were designed by the art director Gustav A. Knauer. It was based on a 1926 novel by Georg Mühlen-Schulte. It was distributed by the German branch of Universal Pictures.

== Cast ==
- Harry Piel as Bob Morland
- Annie Markart as Marietta
- Hilde Hildebrand as Olga Loty
- Kurt Lilien as Gurken-Karl
- Ferdinand Hart as Padube
- Erich Dunskus as Mertens
- Frank Günther as Majewski
- Gerhard Dammann as Der rote Jonas
- Kurt von Ruffin as Paul Romanow
- Fritz Odemar as Felix
- Fritz Steiner as Wiesel
- Alfred Beierle as Arena-Director
- Eugen Rex as Eine Type

== Bibliography ==
- Giesen, Rolf. The Nosferatu Story: The Seminal Horror Film, Its Predecessors and Its Enduring Legacy. McFarland, 2019.
- Klaus, Ulrich J. Deutsche Tonfilme: Jahrgang 1931. Klaus-Archiv, 1988.
