= Of Life and Death =

1930 film

- Directed by: Edmund Heuberger
- Written by: Fritz Falkenstein; Walter Wassermann
- Produced by: Joe Pasternak
- Starring: Eddie Polo; Rina Marsa; Lotte Stein
- Cinematography: Charles J. Stumar
- Production company: Albö-Film
- Distributed by: Deutsche Universal-Film
- Release date: 14 February 1930
- Running time: 82 minutes
- Country: Germany
- Languages: Silent; German intertitles

Of Life and Death (German: Auf Leben und Tod) is a 1930 German thriller film directed by Edmund Heuberger and starring Eddie Polo, Rina Marsa and Lotte Stein. It was shot at the Johannisthal Studios in Berlin. The film's sets were designed by the art director Gustav A. Knauer and Willy Schiller. It was distributed by the German branch of Universal Pictures.

== Cast ==
- Eddie Polo as Artist
- Rina Marsa as Dame
- Lotte Stein as Madame Delbanco
- Peggy Norman as Eveline
- Angelo Ferrari as van Straaten
- Fred Grosser as Junge
- Rolf von Goth as Paul
- Karl Falkenberg as Erster Herr
- Hans Ritter as Zweiter Herr

== Bibliography ==
- Krautz, Alfred (1984). International Directory of Cinematographers, Set- and Costume Designers in Film. Vol. 4. Saur. ISBN 978-3-598-21434-9.
