= Silence in the Forest (1929 film) =

1929 film

- Directed by: William Dieterle
- Written by: Ludwig Ganghofer (novel); Charlotte Hagenbruch
- Produced by: Joe Pasternak
- Starring: William Dieterle; Rina Marsa; Petta Frederik
- Cinematography: Charles J. Stumar
- Production company: Deutsche Universal-Film
- Distributed by: Deutsche Universal-Film
- Release date: 5 November 1929
- Running time: 96 minutes
- Country: Germany
- Languages: Silent; German intertitles

Silence in the Forest (German: Das Schweigen im Walde) is a 1929 German silent drama film directed by William Dieterle and starring Dieterle, Rina Marsa, and Petta Frederik. It was shot at the Babelsberg Studios in Berlin. The film's sets were designed by the art directors Otto Guelstorff and Gabriel Pellon. It was made by the German subsidiary of Universal Pictures and was the first of several film versions of the novel of the same title by Ludwig Ganghofer.

== Cast ==
- William Dieterle as Heinz von Ettingen
- Rina Marsa as Baronin Prankha, seine Verlobte
- Petta Frederik as Lo Petri
- Karl Peter Gillmann as Kammerdiener
- Julius Brandt as Förster
- Emmerich Albert as Peperl
- Franz Neuner as Toni Mazegger
- Gretel Berndt as Burgi
- Georg Kabus as Maler Petri
- Josef Meth as Bürgermeister

== Bibliography ==
- Goble, Alan (1999). The Complete Index to Literary Sources in Film. Berlin: Walter de Gruyter. ISBN 978-3-11-095194-3.
