= Georgia Lind =

German actress (1905–1984)

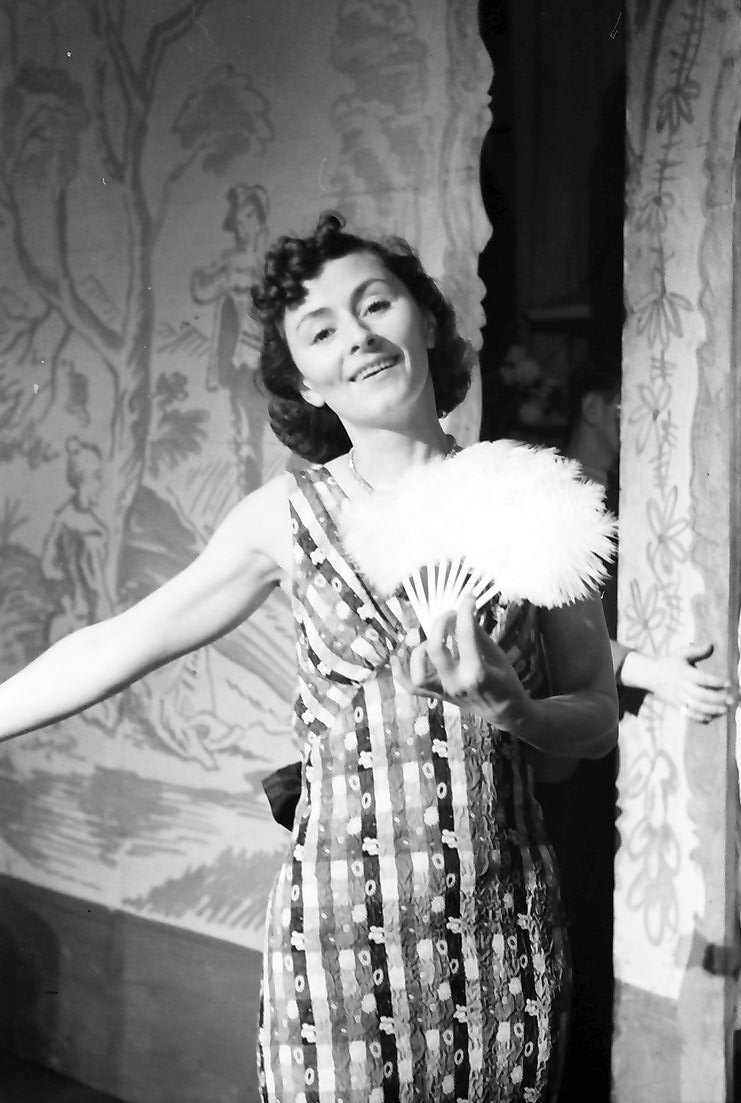
- Georgia Lind in the Kabarett der Komiker in 1939
- Born: 20 November 1905; Chemnitz, German Empire
- Died: 10 December 1984 (aged 79); West Berlin, West Germany
- Occupation: Actress
- Years active: 1928–1958 (film)

Georgia Lind (1905–1984) was a German stage and film actress. She appeared in a mixture of leading and supporting roles in films. From the mid-1930s she devoted herself increasingly to the theatre, and post-Second World War she also did a large amount of radio work. One of her final film performances was a small role in Robert A. Stemmle's Berliner Ballade (1948). She was married to the actor Rudolf Platte.

== Filmography ==
- Yes, Yes, Women Are My Weakness (1929)
- Left of the Isar, Right of the Spree (1929)
- The Youths (1929)
- Distinguishing Features (1929)
- They May Not Marry (1929)
- Painted Youth (1929)
- The Right to Love (1930)
- The Love Market (1930)
- Rag Ball (1930)
- Delicatessen (1930)
- How Do I Become Rich and Happy? (1930)
- Chauffeur Antoinette (1932)
- How Shall I Tell My Husband? (1932)
- A Woman Like You (1933)
- Höllentempo (1933)
- The Sandwich Girl (1933)
- The Two Seals (1934)
- Shipwrecked Max (1936)
- The Man Who Couldn't Say No (1938)
- Berliner Ballade (1948)
- Ihr 106. Geburtstag (1958)

== Bibliography ==
- Shandley, Robert R. (2001). Rubble Films: German Cinema in the Shadow of the Third Reich. Philadelphia: Temple University Press. ISBN 978-1-56639-878-7.
