= The Veil Dancer =

1929 film

- Directed by: Charles Burguet
- Written by: Charles Burguet
- Produced by: Paul Ebner; Maxim Galitzenstein; René Navarre
- Starring: René Navarre; Hertha von Walther; Hans Albers
- Cinematography: Georg Bruckbauer; Günther Krampf
- Music by: Allan Bjerne
- Production company: Maxim-Film
- Release date: 15 November 1929
- Running time: 75 minutes
- Countries: France; Germany
- Languages: Silent; German intertitles

The Veil Dancer (French: Le meneur de joies, German: Die Schleiertänzerin) is a 1929 French-German silent film directed by Charles Burguet and starring René Navarre, Hertha von Walther, and Hans Albers.

The film's sets were designed by the art directors Otto Erdmann and Hans Sohnle.

== Cast ==
- René Navarre
- Hertha von Walther
- Hans Albers
- Maria Forescu
- Evelyn Holt
- Max Maximilian
- Edith Meinhard
- Olga Belajeff
- André Mattoni
- Carl de Vogt
- Siegfried Berisch
- Harry Hardt
- Paul Graetz

== Bibliography ==
- Rège, Philippe (2009). Encyclopedia of French Film Directors. Vol. 1: A–M. Lanham, MD: Scarecrow Press. ISBN 978-0-8108-6939-4.
