= Richthofen (film) =

1927 film

- Richthofen funeral featured in the film
- Directed by: Desider Kertesz; Peter Joseph
- Written by: Willy Rath
- Produced by: Paul Michael Bünger
- Cinematography: Albert Schattmann; Arthur Schwertführer
- Production company: FPG Film Production Association mbH (Berlin)
- Release dates: 3 November 1927 (Germany); 1 September 1929 (revised film, United States)
- Countries: Germany; United States (Revised version)
- Languages: Silent (German intertitles); Sound (1929 version has added music and sound)

Richthofen (aka Richthofen, The Red Knight of the Air and Richthofen, The Red Ace of Germany) is a 1927 German silent war film directed by Desider Kertesz and Peter Joseph. The film was subsequently re-mastered with sound and music effects and re-released in the United States in 1929. The film stars Georg Burghardt, Sybil Moore and Arne Molander. Richthofen was the first film to portray the life of the First World War fighter pilot Manfred von Richthofen.

== Plot ==
The life of Baron Manfred von Richthofen is chronicled. Aerial battles are recreated with the film culminating in his death. In 1925, the German Government requested that von Richthofen's body should be interred at the Invalidenfriedhof Cemetery in Berlin, where many German military heroes and past leaders were buried. Richthofen's body received a state funeral, which is featured in the film.

== Cast ==
- Carl Walther Meyer as Manfred von Richthofen
- Georg Burghardt as de Val
- Sybil Moore as Ivonne de Val (wife)
- Arne Molander as Chsrles de Val (son)
- Helga Thomas as Suzanne de Val (daughter)
- Angelo Ferrari as Ximenes
- Egon von Jordan as Werner Dewall
- Hugo Döblin as administrator
- Gert Eitel Langner as Young aviation officer
- Fred Cassner as Dewall's adjutant

== Production ==
Although most of Richthofen was recreated, the actual newsreel footage of his state funeral was included. A number of aircraft were used in the production: Fokker Dr.1, Nieuport 17, Albatros D.V and Airco DH.9.

After its initial release, producer Bud Pollard acquired the rights to Richthofen, and subsequently re-mastered the film with sound and music. Capitalizing on the legend of Germany's "Ace of aces", Pollard renamed the film, Richthofen, The Red Knight of the Air. Later in distribution in the United States, the film was renamed, Richthofen, The Red Ace of Germany.

== Reception ==
Aviation film historian James Farmer considered Richthofen one of the first films to depict the aerial conflicts of World War I.
