= Gustav A. Knauer =

German film set designer

- Born: 30 October 1886; Berlin, German Empire
- Died: 12 June 1950 (aged 63); Berlin, Germany
- Occupation: Art director
- Years active: 1919-1950 (film)

Gustav A. Knauer (1886–1950) was a German art director. He designed the sets of more than a hundred films during his career.

== Selected filmography ==
- The White Roses of Ravensberg (1919)
- The Flight into Marriage (1922)
- Alone in the Jungle (1922)
- Felicitas Grolandin (1923)
- The Brigantine of New York (1924)
- Darling of the King (1924)
- The Dealer from Amsterdam (1925)
- Old Mamsell's Secret (1925)
- Goetz von Berlichingen of the Iron Hand (1925)
- The Mill at Sanssouci (1926)
- Letters Which Never Reached Him (1925)
- The Bank Crash of Unter den Linden (1926)
- The Bohemian Dancer (1926)
- Light Cavalry (1927)
- Assassination (1927)
- Radio Magic (1927)
- A Murderous Girl (1927)
- Linden Lady on the Rhine (1927)
- Forbidden Love (1927)
- Don Juan in a Girls' School (1928)
- The Lady from Argentina (1928)
- Love in the Cowshed (1928)
- Only a Viennese Woman Kisses Like That (1928)
- The Green Alley (1928)
- A Mother's Love (1929)
- From a Bachelor's Diary (1929)
- Beware of Loose Women (1929)
- The Lord of the Tax Office (1929)
- The Customs Judge (1929)
- Secret Police (1929)
- German Wine (1929)
- The Woman Everyone Loves Is You (1929)
- The Daredevil Reporter (1929)
- The Youths (1929)
- Distinguishing Features (1929)
- The Night of Terror (1929)
- Youthful Indiscretion (1929)
- Yes, Yes, Women Are My Weakness (1929)
- Witnesses Wanted (1930)
- Rag Ball (1930)
- The Love Market (1930)
- Busy Girls (1930)
- Of Life and Death (1930)
- Next, Please! (1930)
- The Man in the Dark (1930)
- Bobby Gets Going (1931)
- Secret of the Blue Room (1932)
- Spies at the Savoy Hotel (1932)
- Rasputin, Demon with Women (1932)
- Secret Agent (1932)
- Life Begins Tomorrow (1933)
- The Gentleman from Maxim's (1933)
- Financial Opportunists (1934)
- What Am I Without You (1934)
- The Flower Girl from the Grand Hotel (1934)
- The Brenken Case (1934)
- Susanne in the Bath (1936)
- The Mysterious Mister X (1936)
- Stjenka Rasin (1936)
- The Barber of Seville (1938)
- Mystery About Beate (1938)
- Women for Golden Hill (1938)
- The Strange Woman (1939)
- Sighs of Spain (1939)
- The Waitress Anna (1941)
- His Son (1942)
- Wild Bird (1943)
- A Waltz with You (1943)
- The Master Detective (1944)
- That Was My Life (1944)
- The Appeal to Conscience (1949)

== Bibliography ==
- Gerd Gemünden. A Foreign Affair: Billy Wilder's American Films. Berghahn Books, 2008.
