= The Woman Everyone Loves Is You =

1929 film directed by Carl Froelich

- Directed by: Carl Froelich
- Written by: Walter Reisch
- Produced by: Carl Froelich; Henny Porten; Wilhelm von Kaufmann
- Starring: Henny Porten; Fritz Kampers; Paul Hörbiger
- Cinematography: Gustave Preiss
- Music by: Hansheinrich Dransmann
- Production companies: Carl Froelich-Film; Henny Porten Filmproduktion
- Distributed by: Deutsche Universal-Film
- Release date: 22 March 1929
- Country: Germany
- Languages: Silent; German intertitles

The Woman Everyone Loves Is You (German: Die Frau, die jeder liebt, bist du) is a 1929 German silent film directed by Carl Froelich and starring Henny Porten, Fritz Kampers and Paul Hörbiger. The film's sets were designed by Gustav A. Knauer and Willy Schiller.

== Plot ==
Minny, a middle-aged woman, works as an assistant in a music shop. She is engaged to the architect Rummelhart, who is waiting for his first big job to propose to Minny. Meanwhile, Minny's singing voice is discovered and she is given the chance to perform in public. The event is successful and she can be seen and heard night after night in Berlin's Wintergarten. Minny's intention is to finally earn enough money to realise Rummelhart's architectural ambitions. In order not to hurt her lfiancé's pride, Minny keeps her second career a secret from him, especially as she is not at all interested in the burgeoning hype surrounding her.

This double life - as a shop assistant during the day and a singer on stage in the evening - leads one day to a serious dilemma: Rummelhart wants to take his bride out to the Wintergarten to hear music in the evening. With great difficulty, the clever Minnie manages to "split herself in two". Rummelhart promptly falls in love with what he thinks is a great singer on stage. Things also seem to be looking up for Rummelhart in business. A supposed count has commissioned him to build a villa. Only later does he find out that Minny is behind it all. In the end, all the secrets and misunderstandings are cleared up and the two decide to finally get married.

== Cast ==
- Henny Porten as Minny
- Fritz Kampers as Rummelhart, ihr Bräutigam
- Paul Hörbiger as Dörsterlein
- Otto Wallburg as Haucke
- Willi Forst as Picard
- Jaro Fürth as Kolbe
- Walter Tost as Max
- Ida Krill as Frau Lehmann
- Ilse Nast as Else
- Toni Tetzlaff as Rosita Rosetta

== Reception ==
Lotte Eisner wrote, "The Porten film, with its harmless bluffing manoeuvre, is developed in extension not in depth. Walter Reisch's manuscript, which doesn't miss out on any comic effect or cuteness but only just sails past emotional complexes, explains that. And Carl Froelich's direction is responsible for this development lacking depth as it cannot do enough with individual moments in the depiction of the milieu, piles small ideas on top of each other and thus deprives itself of its overall effect".

Leo Hirsch from the Berliner Tageblatt was more positive commented, "The purpose of this exercise is to show that life is not really like this and like that, but it could, perhaps, if one were lucky, be like this and like that, namely happy, cheerful, beginning good, end better. (...) One may remain silent about the manuscript in its entirety; there is no way to describe so much 'primal cheerfulness', and the little girls' dream should not be interrupted." while Hans Sahl stated, "The woman everyone loves is still Henny Porten in the opinion of the German distributors, although her well-behaved masking lust, winking at the audience, is also a little heavy and full-bodied this time. Richard Tauber composed a very mediocre hit song to accompany this stagecoach romp."

== Bibliography ==
- Hans-Michael Bock and Tim Bergfelder. The Concise Cinegraph: An Encyclopedia of German Cinema. Berghahn Books, 2009.
