= Ludwig II, King of Bavaria =

1930 film

- Directed by: William Dieterle
- Written by: William Dieterle; Charlotte Hagenbruch
- Produced by: Joe Pasternak; Paul Kohner
- Starring: William Dieterle; Theodor Loos; Eugen Burg
- Cinematography: Charles J. Stumar
- Music by: Hansheinrich Dransmann
- Production company: Deutsche Universal-Film
- Distributed by: Deutsche Universal-Film
- Release date: 10 March 1930
- Running time: 117 minutes
- Country: Germany
- Languages: Silent; German intertitles

Ludwig II, King of Bavaria (1930)

Ludwig II, King of Bavaria (German: Ludwig der Zweite, König von Bayern) is a 1930 German silent historical film directed by William Dieterle and starring Dieterle, Theodor Loos and Eugen Burg. It portrays the life and reign of the monarch Ludwig II who ruled Bavaria from 1864 to 1886. It was made at the Bavaria Studios in Geiselgasteig, Munich. The production company was the German subsidiary of the American studio Universal Pictures.

== Cast ==
- William Dieterle as Ludwig II
- Theodor Loos as Doctor von Gudden
- Eugen Burg
- Hans Heinrich von Twardowski as Otto von Wittelsbach
- Hedwig Pauly-Winterstein
- Trude von Molo as Elisabeth, Empress of Austria
- Rudolph Anders as Diener
- Rina Marsa as Duchess Sophie
- Gerhard Bienert as Hesselschwerdt
- Ferdinand von Alten
- Friedrich Ettel
- Franz Neuner
- Georg Guertler
- Hubert von Meyerinck
- Josef Reithofer
- Michael von Newlinsky
- Harro Helwig
- Arthur Duarte
- Paul Günther
- Max Schreck
- Maria Markstein
- Johanna Klemperer

== Bibliography ==
- Bock, Hans-Michael; Bergfelder, Tim, eds. (2009). The Concise Cinegraph: Encyclopaedia of German Cinema. New York: Berghahn Books. ISBN 978-1-57181-655-9.
- Prawer, Siegbert Salomon (2005). Between Two Worlds: The Jewish Presence in German and Austrian Film, 1910–1933. New York: Berghahn Books. ISBN 978-1-84545-074-8.
