= Affair at the Grand Hotel =

1929 Czech-German silent film

- Directed by: Domenico Gambino; Edmund Heuberger; Theodor Pištěk
- Written by: Edmund Heuberger
- Starring: Theodor Pištěk; Domenico Gambino; Jindřich Plachta
- Production companies: Cando-Film; Lloydfilm
- Distributed by: Futurum-Film-Company
- Release date: 5 June 1929
- Countries: Czechoslovakia; Germany
- Languages: Silent; Czech intertitles

Affair at the Grand Hotel (Czech: Aféra v grandhotelu) is a 1929 Czech-German silent film directed by Domenico Gambino, Edmund Heuberger and Theodor Pištěk.

== Cast ==
- Theodor Pištěk as Manager of Atlantik Hotel
- Domenico Gambino as Fred
- Jindřich Plachta as Greif
- Hilde Jennings as Countess of Berg
- Carl Auen as Count of Berg
- Hugo Werner-Kahle as Dr. Messerschmidt
- Eman Fiala as Greif's Assistant

== Bibliography ==
- Fikejz, Miloš (2006). Český film: herci a herečky, Vol. I: A-K [Czech film: actors and actresses]. Prague: Libri. ISBN 978-80-7277-332-9.
