= Misled Youth =

1929 film

- Directed by: Richard Löwenbein
- Written by: G.D. Farago; C.C. Fürst; O. Karpfen; S.P. Maitinsky
- Starring: Fritz Alberti; Erna Morena; Dolly Davis; Otto Reinwald
- Cinematography: Axel Graatkjær
- Production company: Mondial-Film
- Distributed by: Mondial-Film
- Release date: February 1929
- Country: Germany
- Languages: Silent; German intertitles

Misled Youth (German: Verirrte Jugend) or Youth Gone Astray is a 1929 German silent drama film directed by Richard Löwenbein and starring Fritz Alberti, Erna Morena, and Dolly Davis. It was one of a number of enlightenment films during the Weimar Era that addressed the issue of juvenile delinquency. The film's art direction was by Hans Jacoby.

== Cast ==
- Fritz Alberti as van Straaten
- Erna Morena as Norma, seine Frau
- Dolly Davis as Hilde, die Tochter
- Otto Reinwald as Georg, der Sohn
- Magnus Stifter as von Holstein, Kommandant der Kadettenschule
- Eva Speyer as Maria von Holstein, seine Frau
- Rolf von Goth as Kurt, der Sohn
- Hanni Reinwald as Trude, die Tochter
- Vera Baranovskaya as Witwe Kröger
- Martin Herzberg as Helmut, ihr Sohn
- El' Dura as Nigo, Mulattenmädchen
- Raimondo Van Riel as Der 'Bananenpeter'
- Adele Sandrock as Rosa, seine Frau
- Frydell as Der 'dicke Julius'
- Molly Stengrit as Die 'dicke Berta'
- Heinrich Schroth as Kriminalkommissar
- Ferdinand Bonn as Professor im Gymnasium

== Bibliography ==
- Prawer, Siegbert Salomon (2005). Between Two Worlds: The Jewish Presence in German and Austrian Film, 1910–1933. New York: Berghahn Books. ISBN 978-1-84545-074-8.
