= The Night of Terror =

1929 film

- Directed by: Gennaro Righelli
- Written by: Curt J. Braun; Berthold L. Seidenstein
- Produced by: Fred Lyssa
- Starring: Fritz Kortner; Renée Héribel; Alma Taylor
- Cinematography: Mutz Greenbaum
- Production company: Erda-Film
- Distributed by: Süd-Film
- Release date: 23 September 1929
- Country: Germany
- Languages: Silent; German intertitles

The Night of Terror (German: Die Nacht des Schreckens) is a 1929 German silent film directed by Gennaro Righelli and starring Fritz Kortner, Renée Héribel and Alma Taylor. It was shot at the Staaken Studios in Berlin. The film's sets were designed by Gustav A. Knauer and Willy Schiller.

== Cast ==
In alphabetical order

- Alex Bernard as Belajeff
- William Freshman as Alexej
- Renée Héribelas Marfa
- Fritz Kortner as Prince Wagarin
- Theodor Loos as Jegorow
- Alma Taylor

== Bibliography ==
- Klaus Volker. Fritz Kortner. Hentrich, 1987.
