= The Daredevil Reporter =

1929 German silent thriller film

- Directed by: Ernst Laemmle
- Written by: Billy Wilder
- Produced by: Joe Pasternak
- Starring: Eddie Polo; Gritta Ley; Maria Forescu
- Cinematography: Charles J. Stumar
- Production company: Deutsche Universal-Film
- Distributed by: Deutsche Universal-Film
- Release date: 19 July 1929
- Country: Germany
- Languages: Silent; German intertitles

The Daredevil Reporter (German: Der Teufelsreporter) is a 1929 German silent thriller film directed by Ernst Laemmle and starring Eddie Polo, Gritta Ley and Maria Forescu. It was the first credited screenplay by Billy Wilder.

The film was made by the German subsidiary of Universal Pictures. The sets were designed by Gustav A. Knauer and Willy Schiller.

== Cast ==
- Eddie Polo as Reporter
- Gritta Ley as Bessie
- Maria Forescu as Madame Lourdier
- Robert Garrison as Jonas
- Fred Grosser as Maxe

== Bibliography ==
- Smedley, Nick. A Divided World: Hollywood Cinema and Emigré Directors in the Era of Roosevelt and Hitler, 1933–1948. Intellect Books, 2011.
