= One Hour of Happiness =

1931 film

- Directed by: William Dieterle
- Written by: William Dieterle; Karl Peter Gillmann
- Produced by: Felix Pfitzner
- Starring: William Dieterle; Evelyn Holt; Harald Paulsen
- Cinematography: Wilhelm Ballasz; Charles J. Stumar
- Edited by: Carl Otto Bartning
- Music by: Jean Gilbert
- Production company: Cicero Film
- Distributed by: Deutsche Universal-Film
- Release date: 16 March 1931
- Running time: 82 minutes
- Country: Germany
- Language: German

One Hour of Happiness (German: Eine Stunde Glück) is a 1931 German drama film directed by William Dieterle and starring Dieterle, Evelyn Holt, and Harald Paulsen.

It was released by the German branch of Universal Pictures.

== Synopsis ==
Two workers in a department store see an attractive but poverty-stricken newspaper seller looking through the window at the goods inside. As part of a game they decide to give her gifts of items in the shop, but she doesn't realize that they are only pretending.

== Cast ==
- Evelyn Holt as Das Mädel
- William Dieterle as Eddy
- Harald Paulsen as Tommy
- Hans Reimann as Der Nachtwächter
- Dolly Haas as Die Puppe
- Julius Brandt as Der Portier

== Bibliography ==
- Bock, Hans-Michael; Bergfelder, Tim, eds. (2009). The Concise Cinegraph: Encyclopaedia of German Cinema. New York: Berghahn Books. ISBN 978-1-57181-655-9.
