= Youthful Indiscretion =

1929 film

- Directed by: Carl Heinz Wolff
- Written by: Toni Dathe-Fabri
- Produced by: Gustav Althoff
- Starring: Martin Herzberg; Carola Höhn; Rina Marsa
- Cinematography: Max Grix
- Production company: Aco-Film
- Distributed by: Messtro-Orplid
- Release date: 2 September 1929
- Country: Germany
- Languages: Silent; German intertitles

Youthful Indiscretion (German: Jugendsünden) is a 1929 German silent film directed by Carl Heinz Wolff and starring Martin Herzberg, Carola Höhn and Rina Marsa.

The film's sets were designed by Gustav A. Knauer and Willy Schiller.

== Cast ==
- Martin Herzberg
- Carola Höhn
- Rina Marsa
- Erna Morena
- Henri Peters-Arnolds
- Fritz Schroeter
- Margarete Schön
- Leopold von Ledebur

== Bibliography ==
- Alfred Krautz. International directory of cinematographers, set- and costume designers in film, Volume 4. Saur, 1984.
