= The Youths (1929 film) =

1929 film

- Directed by: Edmund Heuberger
- Written by: Eduard Andrés; Edmund Heuberger
- Produced by: Gustav Althoff
- Starring: Georgia Lind; Daisy D'Ora; Anton Pointner
- Cinematography: Max Grix
- Music by: Bernard Homola
- Production companies: Aco-Film; Orplid-Film
- Distributed by: Messtro-Orplid
- Release date: 24 September 1929
- Country: Germany
- Languages: Silent; German intertitles

The Youths (German: Die Halbwüchsigen) is a 1929 German silent film directed by Edmund Heuberger and starring Georgia Lind, Daisy D'Ora, and Anton Pointner. It was shot at the Staaken Studios in Berlin. The film's art direction was by Gustav A. Knauer and Willy Schiller.

== Cast ==
- Georgia Lind as Lissy
- Daisy D'Ora as Else
- Anton Pointner as Ingenieur Maxwell
- Martin Herzberg as Hans
- Margarete Schön
- Leopold von Ledebur as Hausarzt
- Carla Bartheel as Alsts Freundin
- Angelo Ferrari as Ralph van Alst
- Jaro Fürth as Bremer
- Otto Reinwald as Richard
- Otti Dietze as Bremers Frau
