= Distinguishing Features =

1929 film

- Directed by: Edmund Heuberger
- Written by: Edmund Heuberger
- Produced by: Gustav Althoff
- Cinematography: Max Grix
- Production company: Albö-Film
- Distributed by: Albö-Film
- Release date: 13 December 1929
- Running time: 95 minutes
- Country: Germany
- Languages: Silent; German intertitles

Distinguishing Features (German: Besondere Kennzeichen) is a German silent crime film directed by Edmund Heuberger. It was shot at the Staaken Studios in Berlin. The film's sets were designed by Gustav A. Knauer and Willy Schiller.

== Cast ==
In alphabetical order

- Carl Auen
- Corry Bell
- Kurt Brenkendorf
- Gaston Briese
- Julius Falkenstein
- Angelo Ferrari
- Karl Harbacher
- Fred Immler
- Melitta Klefer
- Georgia Lind
- Hugo Werner-Kahle

== Bibliography ==
- Krautz, Alfred (1984). International Directory of Cinematographers, Set- and Costume Designers in Film. Vol. 4. Munich: Saur. ISBN 978-3-598-21434-9.
