= Beware of Loose Women =

1929 film

- Directed by: Siegfried Philippi
- Written by: Friedrich Raff; Julius Urgiß
- Produced by: Gustav Althoff
- Starring: Rudolf Lettinger; André Mattoni; Margarete Schön
- Cinematography: Max Grix
- Production company: Aco-Film
- Release date: 29 September 1929
- Country: Germany
- Languages: Silent; German intertitles

Beware of Loose Women (German: Hütet euch vor leichten Frauen) is a 1929 German silent film directed by Siegfried Philippi and starring Rudolf Lettinger, André Mattoni, and Margarete Schön.

The film's art direction was by Gustav A. Knauer and Willy Schiller.

== Cast ==
- Rudolf Lettinger as Wilhelm Hasse, Hotelier
- André Mattoni as Walter, sein Sohn
- Margarete Schön
- Helga Thomas as Gertrud, ihre Tochter
- Vivian Gibson as Margot Veroni
- Julius Falkenstein as Der Baron
- Leo Peukert as Neumann, Stadtverordneter
- Gerhard Ritterband
