= Secret Police (film) =

1929 film

- French poster
- Directed by: Edmund Heuberger
- Written by: Fritz Falkenstein; Walter Wassermann
- Produced by: Joe Pasternak
- Starring: Anton Pointner; Eddie Polo; Rina Marsa
- Cinematography: Charles J. Stumar
- Production company: Aco-Film
- Distributed by: Deutsche Universal-Film
- Release date: 6 December 1929
- Running time: 90 minutes
- Country: Germany
- Language: German

Secret Police (German: Geheimpolizisten) is a 1929 German crime film directed by Edmund Heuberger and starring Anton Pointner, Eddie Polo, and Rina Marsa. It was shot at the Johannisthal Studios in Berlin and on location in Wannsee. The film's art direction was by Gustav A. Knauer and Willy Schiller. It was released by the German subsidiary of Universal Pictures.

== Cast ==
- Anton Pointner as Fabribesitzer Wehring
- Eddie Polo as Franz Hayn
- Rina Marsa as Ria Rita
- Ernst Behmer as Onkel Theodor
- Kurt Brenkendorf as Wehrings Diener
- Sylvia Torf as Hayns Wirtin
- Hans Ritter as Mitglied des Sportvereins 'Veilchen'
- Paul Moleska as Mitglied des Sportvereins 'Veilchen'
- Georg Schmieter as Mitglied des Sportvereins 'Veilchen'
- Petra Fröhlich
- Leopold von Ledebur
