= Rustle of Spring (film) =

1929 film

- Directed by: William Dieterle
- Written by: Charlotte Hagenbruch
- Produced by: Paul Kohner; Joe Pasternak
- Starring: William Dieterle; Lien Deyers; Julius Brandt
- Cinematography: Charles J. Stumar
- Production company: Deutsche Universal-Film
- Distributed by: Deutsche Universal-Film
- Release date: 8 October 1929
- Running time: 104 minutes
- Country: Germany
- Languages: Silent; German intertitles

Rustle of Spring (German: Frühlingsrauschen) is a 1929 German silent romance film directed by William Dieterle and starring Dieterle, Lien Deyers and Julius Brandt. It was made by the German subsidiary of Universal Pictures and shot at the Halensee Studios in Berlin. The film's sets were designed by the art directors Otto Guelstorff and Ernst Stern.

== Cast ==
- William Dieterle as Friedrich
- Lien Deyers as Viola
- Julius Brandt as Ole
- Elsa Wagner as Friedrichs Mutter
- Nikolai Malikoff as Großvater
- Alexandra Schmitt as Beschließerin
- Arthur Duarte
- Vivian Gibson

== Bibliography ==
- Bock, Hans-Michael & Bergfelder, Tim. The Concise CineGraph. Encyclopedia of German Cinema. Berghahn Books, 2009.
