= German Wine (film) =

1929 film directed by Carl Froelich

- Directed by: Carl Froelich
- Written by: Max W. Kimmich; Henry Koster; Hans Wilhelm
- Produced by: Carl Froelich; Henny Porten; Wilhelm von Kaufmann
- Starring: Livio Pavanelli; Henny Porten; Paul Henckels
- Cinematography: Gustave Preiss
- Music by: Hansheinrich Dransmann
- Production companies: Carl Froelich-Film; Henny Porten Filmproduktion
- Distributed by: Deutsche Universal-Film
- Release date: 5 February 1929
- Country: Germany
- Languages: Silent; German intertitles

German Wine (German: Liebfraumilch) is a 1929 German silent film directed by Carl Froelich and starring Livio Pavanelli, Henny Porten and Paul Henckels. It takes its German title from the sweet white wine Liebfraumilch.

The film's sets were designed by Gustav A. Knauer and Willy Schiller. It was distributed by the German branch of Universal Pictures.

== Cast ==
- Livio Pavanelli as Hans Hentschel, Weingutsbesitzer
- Henny Porten as Klara, seine Frau
- Paul Henckels as Ihr Großvater
- Trude Lieske as Ida, ihre Kusine
- Wilhelm Bendow as Assessor Hahnenkamp, Ida Bräutigam
- Willi Forst as Laroux
- Max Ehrlich as Black

== Bibliography ==
- Hans-Michael Bock and Tim Bergfelder. The Concise Cinegraph: An Encyclopedia of German Cinema. Berghahn Books, 2009.
