= Der Nürnberger Parteitag der NSDAP =

1929 film

- Directed by: Baldur von Schirach
- Cinematography: Alfons Brümmer; Franz Bertl Seyr; Ludwig Zahn
- Release date: 1929
- Running time: 89.5 minutes
- Country: Weimar Republic
- Languages: Silent film; German intertitles

Der Nürnberger Parteitag der NSDAP (English: The Nuremberg Convention of the NSDAP) is a 1929 propaganda film about the 4th party convention of the Nazi Party.

In 1928 financial difficulties forced the Nazi party to call off its annual congress at Nuremberg, so the next rally, the last to be held before the party took power, was held in August 1929.

The film is much longer than its 17-minute predecessor, and also features a much more mature Nazi party, with many more brown shirts, more elaborate entertainment, such as a fireworks show, and even a celebrity guest, General von Epp.
