= Yes, Yes, Women Are My Weakness =

1929 film

- Sheet music for the film's title song.
- Directed by: Edmund Heuberger
- Written by: Leopold Thoma
- Produced by: Gustav Althoff
- Starring: Georgia Lind; Mary Parker; Hans Albers
- Cinematography: Max Grix
- Music by: Hansheinrich Dransmann
- Production company: Aco-Film
- Release date: 1 June 1929
- Country: Germany
- Languages: Silent; German intertitles

Yes, Yes, Women Are My Weakness (German: Ja, ja, die Frauen sind meine schwache Seite) is a 1929 German silent comedy film directed by Edmund Heuberger and starring Georgia Lind, Mary Parker, and Hans Albers.

The film's sets were designed by Gustav A. Knauer and Willy Schiller.

== Cast ==
- Georgia Lind as Lilly, Bunks Tochter
- Mary Parker as Hella
- Hans Albers as Baron Hans Bingen jun.
- Eugen Burg as Baron Bingen sen.
- Robert Garrison as Bunk, Bingens Kompagnon
- Siegfried Berisch as Sigi, Faktotum
- Henry Bender
- Heinrich Gotho
- Karl Harbacher
- Hans Sternberg
- Leopold Thoma as Reporter
- Emmy Wyda

== Bibliography ==
- Grange, William (2008). Cultural Chronicle of the Weimar Republic. Lanham, MD: Scarecrow Press. ISBN 978-0-8108-5967-8.
