= Peter the Mariner =

1929 film

- Reinhold Schünzel and Renate Müller
- Directed by: Reinhold Schünzel
- Written by: Heinz Gordon; Georg C. Klaren; G. A. Mindzenthy
- Produced by: Reinhold Schünzel
- Starring: Reinhold Schünzel; Renate Müller; Hans Heinrich von Twardowski; Rudolf Biebrach
- Cinematography: Frederik Fuglsang
- Production company: Reinhold Schünzel Film
- Distributed by: Süd-Film
- Release date: 14 May 1929
- Country: Germany
- Languages: Silent; German intertitles

Peter the Mariner (German: Peter der Matrose) is a 1929 German silent comedy drama film directed by Reinhold Schünzel and starring Schünzel, Renate Müller, and Hans Heinrich von Twardowski. It was shot at the Grunewald Studios in Berlin and on location in St. Moritz and in the North Sea.

== Synopsis ==
A man goes on a series of travels around the world after discovering that his wife has been unfaithful to him.

== Cast ==
- Reinhold Schünzel as Peter Sturz
- Renate Müller as Victoria
- Hans Heinrich von Twardowski as Adolf Angel
- Rudolf Biebrach as Martin
- Allan Durant as Herbert Röder

== Bibliography ==
- Prawer, Siegbert Salomon (2005). Between Two Worlds: The Jewish Presence in German and Austrian Film, 1910–1933. New York: Berghahn Books. ISBN 978-1-84545-074-8.
