= From a Bachelor's Diary =

1929 film directed by Erich Schönfelder

- Directed by: Erich Schönfelder
- Written by: René Sorel (play); Reinhold Schünzel
- Produced by: Reinhold Schünzel
- Starring: Reinhold Schünzel; Leopold von Ledebur; Anton Pointner
- Cinematography: Ludwig Lippert; Kurt Wunsch
- Production company: Reinhold Schünzel Film
- Distributed by: Süd-Film
- Release date: 8 January 1929
- Country: Germany
- Languages: Silent; German intertitles

From a Bachelor's Diary (German: Aus dem Tagebuch eines Junggesellen) is a 1929 German silent comedy film directed by Erich Schönfelder and starring Reinhold Schünzel, Leopold von Ledebur and Anton Pointner.

The film's sets were designed by the art directors Gustav A. Knauer and Willy Schiller.

== Cast ==
- Reinhold Schünzel as Franz
- Leopold von Ledebur as von Wallenstein
- Anton Pointner as Baron Alfons von Arenhuys
- Albert Paulig as Herr von Frantz
- Toni Tetzlaff as Dessen Gattin
- Henry Bender as August Krause
- Margarete Kupfer as Amalie, seine Frau
- Iwa Wanja as Lilli, beider Tochter
- Grit Haid as Lulu, eine Bardame
- Carola Höhn as Mieze
- Ludwig Stössel as Herr von Pollak
- Max Ralph-Ostermann as Jean

== Bibliography ==
- Elsaesser, Thomas. Weimar Cinema and After: Germany's Historical Imaginary. Routledge, 2000.
