= Rina Marsa =

- Born: 18 January 1904; Russian Empire
- Other name: Rina Marson
- Occupation: Actress
- Years active: 1928–1933 (film)

Rina Marsa (1904–?) was a Russian-born actress. She appeared in a number of German and Austrian films during the late 1920s and early 1930s in a mixture of lead and supporting roles. She was briefly married to Emilio Genís Varela, a Spanish Banker and Shipping Magnate

== Selected filmography ==
- The Blue Mouse (1928)
- Yacht of the Seven Sins (1928)
- Secret Police (1929)
- Silence in the Forest (1929)
- Ludwig II, King of Bavaria (1929)
- Youthful Indiscretion (1929)
- Love and Champagne (1930)
- Of Life and Death (1930)
- The Uncle from Sumatra (1930)
- General Babka (1930)
- Poor as a Church Mouse (1931)
- No More Love (1931)
- Calais-Dover (1931)
- The Burning Secret (1933)

== Bibliography ==
- Michelangelo Capua. Anatole Litvak: The Life and Films. McFarland, 2015.
