= Martin Herzberg =

German actor (1911–1972)

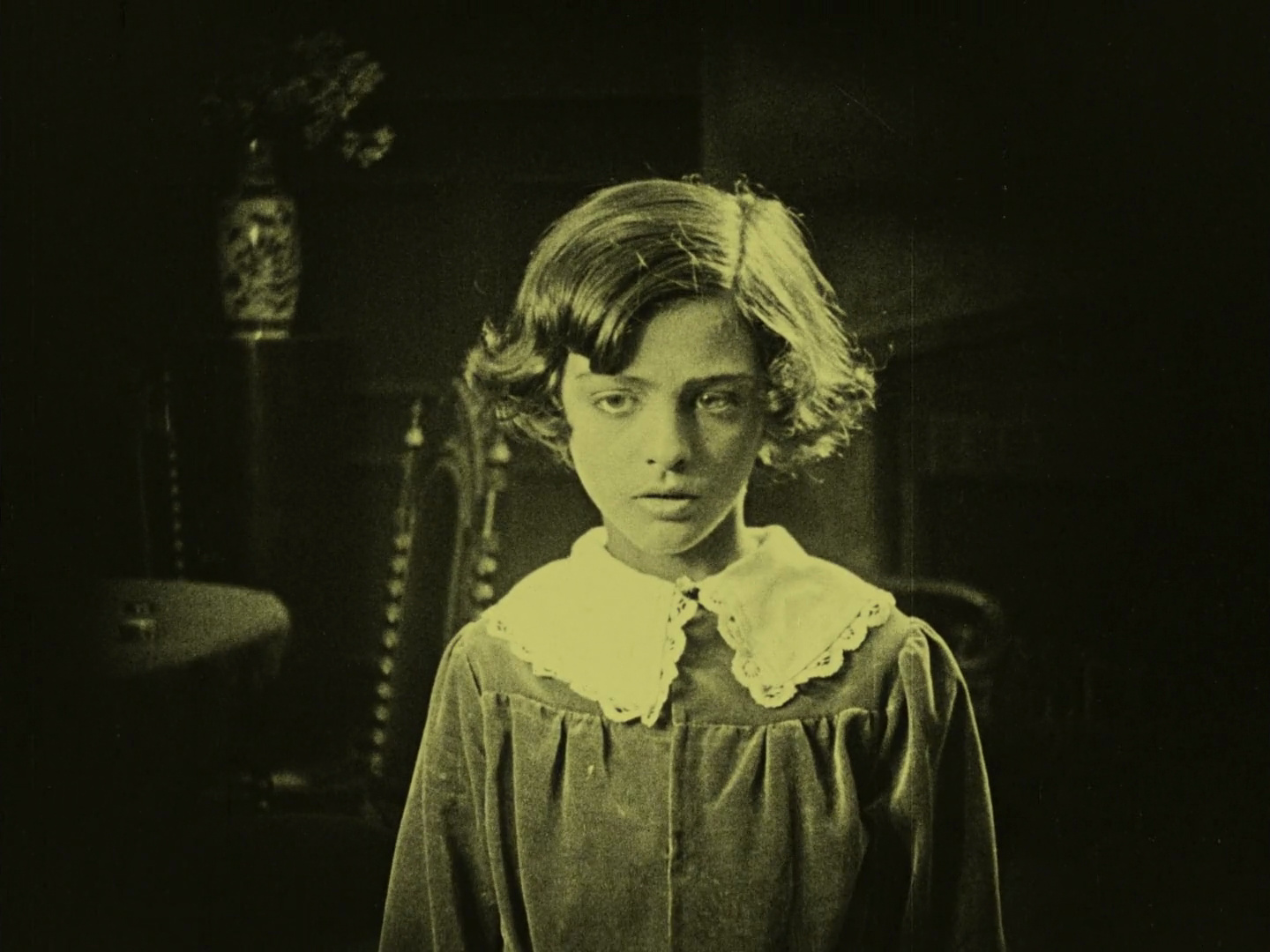
- Martin Herzberg in David Copperfield (1922)
- Born: 15 January 1911; Berlin, German Empire
- Died: 1972 (aged 60–61)
- Occupation: Actor
- Years active: 1918–1930 (film)

Martin Herzberg (1911 – 1972) was a German film actor. As a child actor he appeared in over thirty films during the silent and early sound eras. Herzberg was of Jewish heritage.

He retired from films in 1930 at the age of nineteen and later settled in the Canary Islands.

== Selected filmography ==
- David Copperfield (1922)
- Paganini (1923)
- The Hungarian Princess (1923)
- Comedians of Life (1924)
- Carlos and Elisabeth (1924)
- A Free People (1925)
- Students' Love (1927)
- Mary Stuart (1927)
- Band of Thieves (1928)
- The Age of Seventeen (1929)
- The Youths (1929)
- Misled Youth (1929)
- Youthful Indiscretion (1929)
- The Last Company (1930)
- Father and Son (1930)

== Bibliography ==
- Prawer, S.S. Between Two Worlds: The Jewish Presence in German and Austrian Film, 1910-1933. Berghahn Books, 2005.
