= Lux, King of Criminals =

1929 film

- Directed by: Edmund Heuberger
- Written by: Edmund Heuberger
- Produced by: Gustav Althoff
- Starring: Carl Auen; Paul Michelo Kramer; Fred Immler
- Cinematography: Max Grix
- Music by: Michael Buchstab
- Production company: Albö-Film
- Distributed by: Albö-Film
- Release date: 12 March 1929
- Country: Germany
- Languages: Silent; German intertitles

Lux, King of Criminals (German: Lux, der König der Verbrecher) is a 1929 German silent film directed by Edmund Heuberger and starring Carl Auen, Paul Michelo Kramer and Fred Immler.

The film's sets were designed by the art director Robert A. Dietrich.

Other films with Carl Auen as Lux are The Man in the Dark (1930), Pariser Unterwelt (1930) and Zweimal Lux (1930)

== Cast ==
- Carl Auen as Lux
- Paul Michelo Kramer as Edgar von Allmen
- Fred Immler as José
- Nico Turoff as Rico
- Carla Bartheel as Madeleine
- Melitta Klefer as Carlotta
- Julius Falkenstein
- Karl Harbacher
- Lia Hildebrandt
- Hugo Werner-Kahle

== Bibliography ==
- Alfred Krautz. International directory of cinematographers, set- and costume designers in film, Volume 4. Saur, 1984.
