= A Mother's Love (1929 film) =

1929 film

- Directed by: Georg Jacoby
- Written by: Friedrich Raff; Julius Urgiß
- Produced by: Henny Porten; Wilhelm von Kaufmann
- Starring: Henny Porten; Gustav Diessl; Paul Henckels
- Cinematography: Karl Puth
- Music by: Pasquale Perris
- Production company: Henny Porten Filmproduktion
- Distributed by: Vereinigte Star-Film
- Release date: 20 August 1929
- Country: Germany
- Languages: Silent; German intertitles

A Mother's Love (German: Mutterliebe) is a 1929 German silent drama film directed by Georg Jacoby and starring Henny Porten, Gustav Diessl, and Paul Henckels. It was shot at the Staaken Studios in Berlin and on location in Pomerania. The film's sets were designed by Gustav A. Knauer and Willy Schiller.

== Cast ==
- Henny Porten as Maria Immermann
- Gustav Diessl as Hans Immermann
- Paul Henckels as Malthausen
- Ernst Stahl-Nachbaur as Erich Vogt
- Ibolya Szekely as Hedwig, Malthausens Tochter
- Inge Landgut as Mädi Verena, Dienstmädchen
- Elisabeth Pinajeff as Anita, Vogts Frau
- Hilde Maroff as Lissy, Dienstmädchen
- Hugo Werner-Kahle as Untersuchungsrichter
- Jaro Fürth (uncredited)
- Lotte Stein (uncredited)
- Bruno Ziener (uncredited)
