= Edmund Heuberger =

Swiss film director and screenwriter

- Born: 28 April 1883; Aarau, Switzerland
- Died: 9 April 1962 (aged 78); Zürich, Switzerland
- Occupations: Director, writer, art director
- Years active: 1916–1942 (film)

Edmund Heuberger (28 April 1883 – 9 April 1962) was a Swiss art director, screenwriter and film director.

== Selected filmography ==
=== Screenwriter ===
- The Man Without Nerves (1924)
- The Fake Emir (1924)
- A Dangerous Game (1924)
- Adventure on the Night Express (1925)
- Swifter Than Death (1925)
- The Black Pierrot (1926)
- Night of Mystery (1927)
- Affair at the Grand Hotel (1929)
- Bobby Gets Going (1931)

=== Director ===
- Lux, King of Criminals (1929)
- Distinguishing Features (1929)
- The Youths (1929)
- Yes, Yes, Women Are My Weakness (1929)
- Secret Police (1929)
- Witnesses Wanted (1930)
- Of Life and Death (1930)
- The Man in the Dark (1930)
- The Lost Valley (1934)
- Das Menschlein Matthias (1941)
