= Charles J. Stumar =

Hungarian-American cinematographer (1890-1935)

- Born: August 28, 1890; Budapest, Austria-Hungary
- Died: June 29, 1935 (aged 44); Los Angeles, California, U.S.
- Occupation: Cinematographer

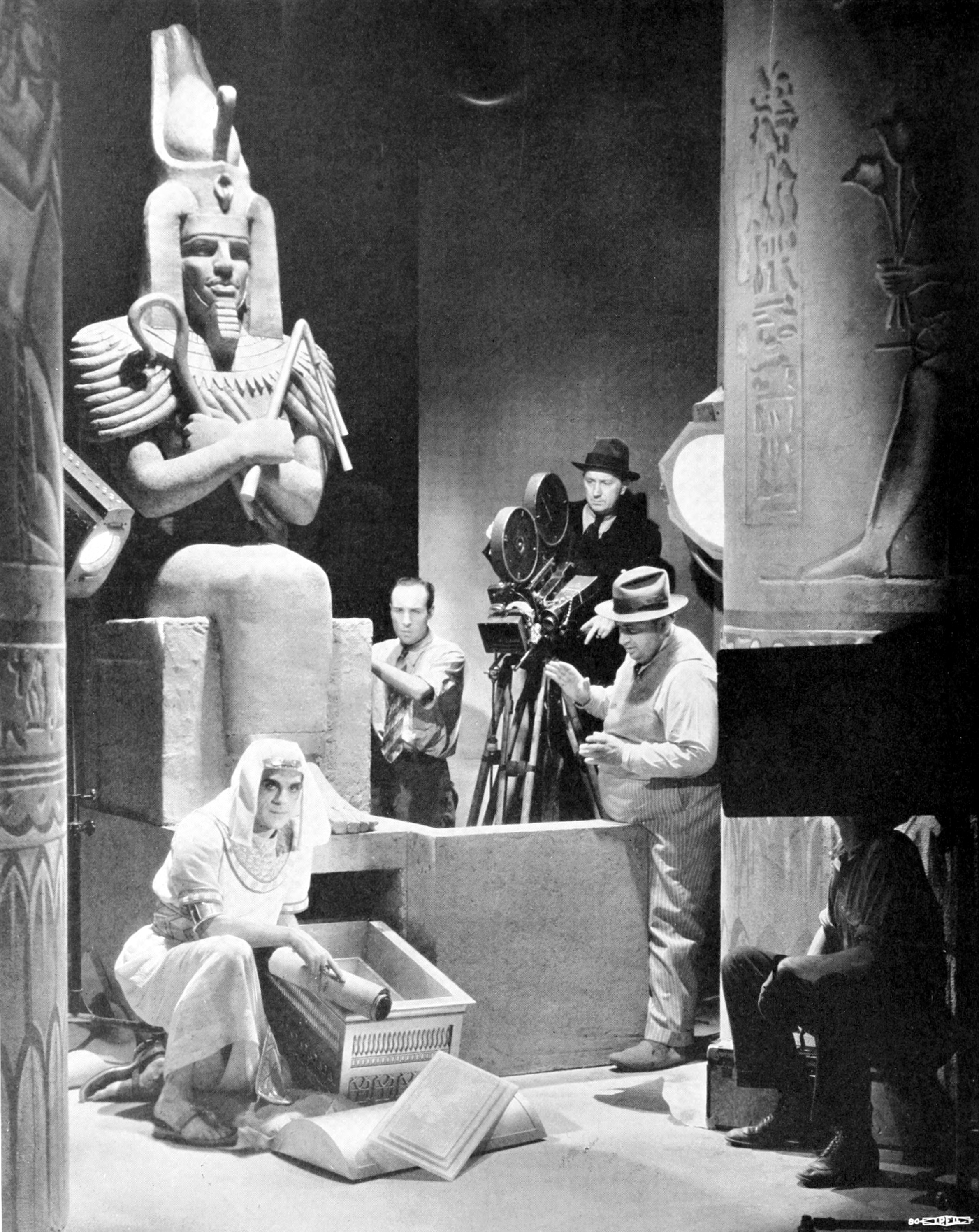
Charles Stumar behind the camera during the filming of The Mummy (1932), with Boris Karloff at left and director Karl Freund at right

Charles J. Stumar (28 August 1890 – 29 June 1935) was a Hungarian-American cinematographer who shot 110 English and German language films from 1917 until his death in a plane accident. He was a brother of cinematographer John Stumar.

== Biography ==
He was born on 28 August 1890 in Budapest, Hungary. He died on 29 June 1935 in Los Angeles, California. Stumar was inspired by director Karl Freund while working on the 1932 film The Mummy and adapted his approach when filming the 1935 Werewolf of London.

== Selected filmography ==
- Chicken Casey (1917)
- The Snarl (1917)
- Wooden Shoes (1917)
- The Tar Heel Warrior (1917)
- Three X Gordon (1918)
- One Dollar Bid (1918)
- The Drifters (1919)
- Love (1920)
- Love Madness (1920)
- Greater Than Love (1921)
- I Am Guilty (1921)
- Lying Lips (1921)
- When Husbands Deceive (1922)
- The Freshie (1922)
- When the Devil Drives (1922)
- The Hunchback of Notre Dame (1923)
- The Abysmal Brute (1923)
- K – The Unknown (1924)
- Siege (1925)
- Poker Faces (1926)
- The Combat (1926)
- Perch of the Devil (1927)
- The Cohens and the Kellys in Paris (1928)
- Anybody Here Seen Kelly? (1928)
- The Price of Fear (1928)
- The Michigan Kid (1928)
- Rustle of Spring (1929)
- Ludwig II, King of Bavaria (1929)
- The Tip Off (1929)
- Secret Police (1929)
- The Daredevil Reporter (1929)
- Next, Please! (1930)
- Witnesses Wanted (1930)
- The Rhineland Girl (1930)
- Busy Girls (1930)
- Of Life and Death (1930)
- One Hour of Happiness (1931)
- A House Divided (1931)
- Hearts of Humanity (1932)
- The Mummy (1932)
- Black Beauty (1933)
- Storm Over the Andes (1935)
- Straight from the Heart (1935)
- Werewolf of London (1935)
- The Raven (1935)
