= Berlin Alexanderplatz (disambiguation) =

Berlin Alexanderplatz can refer to:

- Berlin Alexanderplatz, a 1929 novel by Alfred Döblin
- Berlin-Alexanderplatz (1931 film)
- Berlin Alexanderplatz (2020 film)
- Berlin Alexanderplatz (miniseries), a 1980 TV serial
- Berlin Alexanderplatz station, a railway station

== See also ==
- Alexanderplatz
