= Wang Lun =

Qing dynasty rebel leader (died 1774)

Wang Lun (simplified Chinese: 王伦; traditional Chinese: 王倫; pinyin: Wáng Lún; died 1 November 1774) was the leader of the White Lotus sect in Shandong province, China in the 1770s. He preached a millenarian philosophy, emphasizing the imminent coming of the Buddha Maitreya.

A martial arts master and self-taught physician, Wang taught his followers yoga, meditation, and the ability to fast for very long periods by drinking purified water. His group became known as the "Pure Water Sect", and by 1774 numbered several thousand.

Having told the sect that he was the rebirth of Maitreya and was destined to become Emperor of China, he mobilized his followers and marched on the city of Shouzhang on 3 October 1774. With the help of confederates inside the city gates, the rebels quickly seized the city and ransacked the treasury and granary. They held the city for a few days only, before abandoning it to attack the city of Yangku. Yangku was easily captured, as the local garrison was marching to relieve Shouzhang, which the local authorities believed was still in rebel hands. The rebels then moved on to capture the towns of Tangyi and then Liulin with ease, and from there they marched on to Linqing, a large and strategically important city.

Before reaching Linqing, Wang Lun's rebels defeated Qing dynasty troops at every engagement, and rumor spread that the rebels practiced invulnerability magic. Many city officials of Linqing fled in terror before the White Lotus rebels arrived at the city on 11 October.

Over the next few weeks, Wang Lun's forces besieged the city, but the Qing defenses commanded by Qin Zhenjun effectively resisted the attack. Eyewitnesses reported that rebel troops fought fiercely even when there seemed to be no hope. Wang Lun's young concubine Wu Sannian reportedly held off Qing soldiers for hours singlehandedly before being overcome and killed. By 31 October, Wang was surrounded. Determined not to be captured alive, he set fire to the tower in which he was trapped. His burned body was identified by his sword and bracelets.

In fiction, Wang's life is narrated in Alfred Döblin's 1916 historical novel, The Three Leaps of Wang Lun.

== Sources ==
- Ching, Frank (1988), Ancestors: 900 Years in the Life of a Chinese Family, William Morrow & Co, ISBN 9780688044619
- Naquin, Susan (1989), Shantung Rebellion: the Wang Lun Uprising of 1774, Yale University Press, ISBN 0300026382
