= Berge Meere und Giganten =

1924 science-fiction novel by Alfred Döblin

Mountains Seas and Giants
- First edition
- Author: Alfred Döblin
- Original title: Berge Meere und Giganten
- Language: German
- Genre: Science fiction novel
- Publisher: S. Fischer
- Publication date: 1924
- Publication place: Germany
- Media type: Print (Hardcover & Paperback)
- Pages: 588
- LC Class: PT2607.O35 B4 1924

Berge Meere und Giganten (Mountains Seas and Giants) is a 1924 science fiction novel by German author Alfred Döblin. Stylistically and structurally experimental, the novel follows the development of human society into the 27th century and depicts global-scale conflicts between future polities, technologies, and natural forces, culminating in the catastrophic harvesting of Iceland's volcanic energy in order to melt Greenland's ice cap. Among critics, Berge Meere und Giganten has the reputation of being a difficult and polarizing novel, and has not received nearly as much attention as Döblin's following novel, Berlin Alexanderplatz (1929).

Inspired by the mundane sight of pebbles rolling in the Baltic Sea surf in the summer of 1921, Döblin began writing Berge Meere und Giganten that fall, conducting extensive research into various natural and human sciences in the process. Although he had originally conceived of it as a hymn to the city and technology, over the course of writing the novel it evolved into a tribute to the power of nature. He finished the manuscript in the summer of 1923, and it was published by Fischer Verlag the following year.

== Plot ==
=== First Book: The Western Continents ===
The novel begins by recounting the time that has passed since the First World War: generations have come and gone, and technology continues to advance and spread from Europe and America over the rest of the world. Overpopulation has become a problem, and the leaders of industry have seized state power. Pacified by the improvement in material conditions, the masses of the cities raise no objection. At the same time that it sees radical technological innovations, Europe suffers declining birth rates and experiences waves of mass migration from Africa. In an effort to maintain their rule, the ruling Senates of Europe agree to restrict the public's access to science and technology. London is the leading power in the west, and "India-Japan-China" is the other world power.

=== Second Book: The Ural War ===
After years of state repression and surveillance, the masses have become soft and restless. A spirit of resistance against the machines arises, and the new generation of rulers shifts course. After the end of the twenty-fourth century, access to science and technology is opened up again and nationalism reemerges, alongside a quasi-religious devotion to the machines. Later, researchers led by a scientist named Meki invent synthetic food production, which leads to the abandonment of farms and the countryside, a new wave of urbanization, and the solidification of the Senates' political control. By the twenty-seventh century, freed from the need to support themselves the masses have again become idle and restless; it becomes increasingly difficult to even find enough people to run the synthetic food factories. A group of leaders incite nationalism and war to combat this tendency; the result is a catastrophic world war between Europe and Asia—the "Ural War"—involving advanced weapons that are able to channel the elements and that turn much of Russia into a wall of fire, and then into a flooded plain. After the war the states of Europe grow increasingly isolated from each other, and "every cityscape fought for its existence."

=== Third Book: Marduk ===
The postwar climate sees a period of austerity and mistrust towards the machines. Returning from the horrors of the war, Marke becomes the Consul of Berlin and instates a reign of isolation and deurbanization. Advanced weapons are destroyed, people are driven out into the countryside to cultivate the land, and the giant energy accumulators are destroyed. Columns made to look like bulls are erected in city squares and at crossroads, and roar twice a day like a dying animal to remind people of the catastrophe of the Ural War. Marduk succeeds Marke as the Consul and continues the period of brutal authoritarian rule.

=== Fourth Book: The Deceivers ===
Marduk's rule begins to be challenged by both his friends and his enemies. Groups of "deceivers" ("Täuscher") wage a protracted guerrilla war against him, seeking a rapprochement with science and technology. The resurgent London senate seeks to bring Marduk's excesses under control, and he in turn attempts to expand his realm to gain more cultivable land, attacking nearby city-states such as Hamburg and Hannover. Zimbo, from the Congo, becomes a rival of Marduk's. New elemental weapons are developed over the course of these struggles, which involve scenes of violence and torture. Zimbo's forces eventually manage to unseat Marduk, who then wages a guerrilla campaign of his own, destroying machines and factories wherever he can. He dies in action, and Zimbo becomes the third Consul of Berlin.

=== Fifth Book: The Draining of the Cities ===
As the fifth book begins, the setting shifts briefly to North America. Following the Ural War, the Japanese had led an Asian occupation of western North America. The local populations, inspired by Native American beliefs and mythologies, react by leaving the cities for the wilderness and destroying the food factories and cities, eventually driving out the Asian occupation. In America and then globally people begin leaving cities in favor of the wild. Shamanism and the belief in ghosts reemerge amongst the populace, as does an oral tradition of story-telling. The draining of the cities grows into a settler movement: egalitarian communities that live in nature, characterized by gender equality and sexual liberation. In response to the threat this movement poses to the ruling Senates, political leaders in London hatch a plan to colonize Greenland, thereby channeling both the drive for technological innovation and the drive to settle new land.

=== Sixth Book: Iceland ===
To settle Greenland, it is necessary to melt its ice sheet; to do this, a massive expedition sets out for Iceland to harvest its volcanic energy. Led by Kylin, the expedition begins breaking open Iceland's volcanoes. Resistance by the local population is met with massacres. Once Iceland has been split open and turned into a lake of magma, the energy is stored in "tourmaline veils" ("Turmalinschleier"). The geography of Iceland is described in rich detail in this section, as is the cataclysmic destruction of the landscape. The scale of destruction proves traumatizing to many of the expedition members, who flee and have to be forcibly recaptured before the expedition can head to Greenland.

=== Seventh Book: The Melting of Greenland's Ice ===
As they sail for Greenland, strange things begin to happen to the ships bearing the tourmaline veils. Marine life and sea birds of all kinds are attracted towards them, and crew stationed aboard them for too long begin acting intoxicated and amorous. The plant and animal life attracted to the ships experiences rapid growth, so that before they reach Greenland the ships look more like mountains or meadows than ships. Strange sea creatures never before seen appear around the ships, and when the expedition is ready to deploy the tourmaline veils, they have to cut through the riot of organic growth that has totally filled the ships. Once the energy of the veils is unleashed on Greenland, it melts the ice quickly but also has unanticipated effects. Prehistoric bones and plant remains that were buried under the ice are reanimated, and fuse together into monstrous forms made up of plant, animal, and mineral parts. Greenland, free of its icy burden, rises up, ripping from north to south in the process and becoming two separate islands. As the chapter ends, the now enormous monsters brought to life by the volcanic energy are spilling away from Greenland towards Europe.

=== Eighth Book: The Giants ===
As the wave of mutilation breaks over Europe, the force animating the monsters proves fatal: any contact with their bodies or blood provokes a frenzy of organic growth, so that animals of different species grow into each other and humans are strangled by their own growing organs. The populations remaining in the cities move underground. The ruling technocrats, led by Francis Delvil, begin to devise biological weapons to combat the monsters. Using the energy of the remaining tourmaline veils, they construct massive towers—the eponymous "Giants"—out of humans, animals, and plants, grotesque assemblages of organic life that, planted on mountains or in the sea, serve as defensive turrets. In a frenzied technological mania, some of the scientists turn themselves into giant monsters and wander around Europe, wreaking havoc and forgetting their original intent. A group of the original Iceland expedition led by Kylin returns to Europe, bearing the memory of the devastation they caused.

=== Ninth Book: Venaska ===
The novel's final book begins with a group of settlers in southern France who call themselves the "Snakes" ("Die Schlangen"). Venaska, a beautiful woman from the south, becomes influential amongst the settlers and is revered as a kind of goddess of love. With the other "Snakes" she lives in nature, apart from the wrecked cities and their dwindling authoritarian rule. As the traumatized remnants of the Iceland expedition come into contact with the settlers, a new type of society comes into existence, marked by a reconciled relationship to nature and egalitarian social relations. To the north the giants, now including Delvil among them, still rage, but their violence slowly subsides. Within the large number of creatures that compose their bodies, they begin to lose their individual human consciousness and grow into the earth, becoming mountains and hills in England and Cornwall. As Delvil fights to retain his consciousness, Venaska arrives and reconciles him with his dissolution into nature. She too grows into the hills that mark the former giants. In the wake of the destruction of Europe's cities and the collapse of its governments, waves of refugees storm across the landscape accompanied by rage and cannibalism. The survivors of the Iceland expedition meet them head-on, dividing them into groups and leading them to settlements around the globe. As the novel ends, humanity has resettled and begun to cultivate the destroyed landscapes. The fertile land between the Belgian coast and the Loire is renamed Venaska.

== Thematic and stylistic aspects ==
Critic Gabriele Sander has called Berge Meere und Giganten an "epic about the conflict between nature and technology," and other critics have also emphasized the novel's portrayal of the often violent relationship between humanity, nature, and technology. Peter Sprengel has taken a different approach, arguing that the novel is characterized not by a dichotomous opposition between nature and technology, but rather by the way it blurs the distinction between the organic and the inorganic. Hannelore Qual has documented how the novel ties Döblin's philosophy of nature to his ideas about society and politics, arguing for an affinity between Döblin's thought and the anarchism of Gustav Landauer and Pyotr Kropotkin.

Berge Meere und Giganten presciently invokes such topics as world war, urbanization, the alienation from nature, mechanization, the dehumanization of the modern world, as well as mass migration, globalization, totalitarianism, fanaticism, terrorism, state surveillance, genetic engineering, synthetic food, the breeding of humans, biochemical warfare, and others. Döblin's experiences during the First World War, when he served in Alsace as a military doctor, left their mark on the novel: psychically damaged veterans, devastated landscapes, and all-destructive technological excesses give this novel its particularly apocalyptic feeling. Because of the bleak vision of the future that the novel presents, it has often been described by critics as a fundamentally pessimistic, irrationalistic, or regressive work. Hannelore Qual argues against this that Berge Meere und Giganten is instead characterized by an optimistic view of social and historical perfectibility; the portrayals of catastrophic destruction and brutally authoritarian regimes reflect, in this reading, not Döblin's own world view but instead different historical possibilities, alongside which more egalitarian and peaceful social orders are to be found.

Stylistically, it is characterized by its innovative syntax and the frequent paratactic use of multiple subjects, objects, and verbs in a single sentence without conjunctions or punctuation to separate them. Structurally, it consists of nine books that, because of the immense time span, often do not share common characters or settings; the third-person narrative voice, which has been likened to that of an anonymous chronicler, does not pass judgment on the events or provide commentary that would help tie events together.

== Critical reception ==
The novel was regarded as a difficult work upon its release, and its experimental stylistic, structural, and thematic idiosyncrasies have often provoked emotional judgments from critics, ranging from fascination to repulsion. Among others, Günter Grass has praised the novel's continued relevance and insight.

Despite the early fascination with the novel, after the Second World War it fell into neglect as critical attention to Döblin was directed primarily towards his next novel, Berlin Alexanderplatz (1929), and a new edition of Berge Meere und Giganten was not published until 1977. The last few decades have however seen a resurgence of critical interest in the novel.

== Genesis and publication ==
Döblin wrote the novel between fall 1921 and summer 1923. According to the author, the novel set out to explore the question: "What will become of the human being if he keeps living like he lives now?" Döblin would later write that the original inspiration for the novel was the sight of pebbles rolling in the surf on the Baltic Sea coast during a family vacation in the summer of 1921; this epiphanic vision provoked a sudden and uncharacteristic interest in nature for Döblin, who began taking extensive notes in various Berlin museums and libraries on natural history and science, geology, geography, climatology, ethnography, and other fields. If he had originally conceived of the novel as a "hymn to the city" and to technology, as he got into the project it increasingly became an encomium to nature. In early 1922 he closed his medical practice for a month to further his research for the novel. The section on Iceland and Greenland, which occurs towards the end of the published novel, was one of the first sections Döblin envisioned and drafted, and an advance publication of this section appeared in the Vossische Zeitung on New Year's Day 1922 with the title Die Enteisung Grönlands im Jahre 2500. Das Zauberschiff (The Melting of Greenland's Ice in the Year 2500: The Magical Ship). In May 1922 Döblin rented a villa in Zehlendorf to complete the draft of the novel, a setting explicitly referenced in the novel's unusual "Dedication". The exertions of drafting the novel provoked a sort of nervous breakdown: as he would later write, "the fantasy was too wild and my brain would not release me." In a 2011 biography, Wilfried Schoeller has suggested that there was an additional reason for Döblin's breakdown—namely, that the temporary move to Zehlendorf was also his unsuccessful attempt to leave his wife in favor of his lover Charlotte Niclas. According to Schoeller, this personal dimension left its mark on the novel, especially on the novel's dedication.

Berge Meere und Giganten was published in 1924 by the Fischer Verlag. In 1931 Döblin began working on a radically simplified and shortened version, in order to make the difficult work more accessible to a wider audience; the new version was published by the Fischer Verlag in May 1932 under the title Giganten (Giants). 2006 saw the release of a new critical edition of Berge Meere und Giganten by the Deutscher Taschenbuch Verlag (Munich), edited by Gabriele Sander. The original manuscript and Döblin's extensive notes for the novel are preserved in the German literary archive in Marbach am Neckar. On June 15, 2021, Galileo Publishing released the first English translation of the novel, by Chris Godwin, under the title Mountains Oceans Giants: An Epic of the 27th Century.
