= German revolution (disambiguation) =

German revolution can refer to:

- German revolutions of 1848–1849, a series of loosely coordinated protests and rebellions in the states of the German Confederation
- German Revolution of 1918–1919, a civil conflict in the German Empire at the end of the First World War
- Peaceful Revolution, 1989–90 in East Germany, the process of sociopolitical change that led to the reunification of Germany

== See also ==
- German reunification
- November 1918: A German Revolution, a tetralogy of books by Alfred Döblin, published 1933–1945
- Revolution and Counter-Revolution in Germany, an 1896 book by Friedrich Engels with contributions from Karl Marx
