= Wallenstein (novel) =

1920 novel by Alfred Döblin

- Cover of the first edition
- Author: Alfred Döblin
- Language: German
- Genre: Historical novel
- Publisher: S. Fischer
- Publication date: 1920
- Publication place: Germany
- Media type: Print (Hardcover & Paperback)

Wallenstein is a 1920 historical novel by German author Alfred Döblin. Set in Central Europe during the Thirty Years War, the novel's plot is organized around the polar figures of Ferdinand II, Holy Roman Emperor, on the one hand, and Albrecht von Wallenstein, on the other. Döblin's approach to narrating the war differed from prevailing historiography in that, rather than interpreting the Thirty Years War primarily as a religious conflict, he portrays it critically as the absurd consequence of a combination of national-political, financial, and individual psychological factors. Döblin saw a strong similarity between the Thirty Years War and the First World War, during which he wrote Wallenstein. The novel is counted among the most innovative and significant historical novels in the German literary tradition. In large part, contemporary critics found the novel to be difficult, dense, and chaotic—a reception Döblin discussed in his 1921 essay "The Epic Writer, His Material, and Criticism"—yet writers such as Lion Feuchtwanger, Franz Blei, and Herbert Ihering praised Wallenstein for its formal innovation, poetic language, epic scope, and bold departure from other German writing of the time. Despite the novel's difficulty, the critical consensus was that Wallenstein was a major achievement and confirmed the promise seen in Döblin's earlier historical novel, The Three Leaps of Wang Lun.
