= Xu Yunbei =

Chinese politician

- 徐运北

Minister of the Second Ministry of Light Industry
- In office 1967–1970
- Premier: Zhou Enlai
- Preceded by: New title
- Succeeded by: Position revoked

Personal details
- Born: July 1914 Tangyi County, Shandong, China
- Died: 6 January 2018 (aged 103) Beijing, China
- Party: Chinese Communist Party
- Spouse: Sha Xiaolu
- Education: Central Party School of the Chinese Communist Party

Chinese name
- Simplified Chinese: 徐运北
- Traditional Chinese: 徐運北
Transcriptions
Standard Mandarin
- Hanyu Pinyin: Xú Yùnběi

Xu Yunbei (Chinese: 徐运北; July 1914 – 6 January 2018) was a Chinese politician who served as Minister of the Second Ministry of Light Industry from 1967 to 1970.

He was a representative of the 7th, 8th, and 19th National Congress of the Chinese Communist Party. He was a delegate to the 3rd National People's Congress and a member of the Standing Committee of the 6th and 7th National People's Congress.

== Biography ==
Xu was born in Tangyi County (now Dongchangfu, Liaocheng), Shandong, in July 1914. He attended Zhengyi Middle School (正谊中学) in Jinan, capital of Shandong. He joined the Chinese Communist Party (CCP) in January 1934.

In the spring of 1935, he participated in the establishment of the CCP West Shandong Special Committee and served as its party secretary.

Beginning from the winter of 1945, he successively served as deputy party secretary of the CCP Hebei-Shandong-Henan Committee and deputy political commissar of the Hebei-Shandong-Henan Military Region.

In 1949, he joined the 5th Corps of the 2nd Field Army in southwest China and later served as first deputy party secretary of the CCP Guizhou Provincial Committee.

In 1952, he was appointed vice minister of Health, responsible for eliminating schistosomiasis in south China. In 1967, he assumed the position of minister of the Second Ministry of Light Industry.

During the Cultural Revolution, he suffered political persecution and was sent to the May Seventh Cadre Schools to do farm works. In May 1973, he was reinstated as deputy director of Beijing Municipal Revolutionary Committee and was admitted to member of the CCP Beijing Municipal Committee, the city's top authority. He became vice minister of Light Industry in August 1980. He retired in May 1996.

On 6 January 2018, he died in Beijing, at the age of 103.

== Family ==
Xu married Sha Xiaolu (沙晓鲁), who committed suicide under political persecution during the Cultural Revolution. Their son Xu Niansha (徐念沙; born 1957), chairman of the China Poly Group (2018–2021), married Liu Xiaoli (刘晓莉), the youngest daughter of Liu Huaqing.

Government offices
New title	Minister of the Second Ministry of Light Industry; 1967–1970	Succeeded by Position revoked
