= Destiny's Journey =

1949 autobiography by Alfred Döblin

- Cover of the first edition
- Author: Alfred Döblin
- Original title: Schicksalsreise
- Translator: Edna McCown
- Language: German
- Genre: Autobiography
- Publisher: Josef Knecht
- Publication date: 1949
- Publication place: Germany
- Media type: Print (hardback & paperback)

Destiny's Journey (Schicksalsreise) is a 1949 autobiography by German author Alfred Döblin. In this book Döblin gives an account of his experiences of exile and war between 1940 and 1948. Beginning with his flight from Paris on the eve of the Nazi invasion, Destiny's Journey chronicles his escape from Europe through Spain and Portugal, his years in Los Angeles, his conversion to Catholicism during the war, and his return to Germany in 1945 after twelve years of exile. Despite Döblin's hopes for the book's broad reception and impact, fewer than 2,000 copies were sold in the first two years after publication.
