= Zhengjia, Shandong =

Zhengjia 郑家镇
- Town
- Location in Shandong Zhengjia (China)
- Coordinates: 36°24′48″N 115°43′01″E
- Country: People's Republic of China
- Province: Shandong
- Prefecture-level city: Liaocheng
- District: Dongchangfu
- Time zone: UTC+8 (China Standard)

Zhengjia (Chinese: 郑家镇) is a town in Dongchangfu District, Liaocheng, in western Shandong province, China.
