= Asew =

1935 film

- Directed by: Phil Jutzi
- Written by: At. Timann
- Starring: Fritz Rasp; Olga Chekhova; Hilde von Stolz; Wolfgang Liebeneiner
- Cinematography: Eduard Hoesch
- Edited by: Else Baum; Vicki Baum
- Music by: Willy Schmidt-Gentner
- Production companies: Atlantis-Film; Maxim-Film
- Distributed by: Tobis-Sascha Film
- Release date: 18 January 1935
- Running time: 78 minutes
- Countries: Austria; Nazi Germany
- Language: German

Asew or Double-Agent Asew or Asew the Agent Provocateur (German: Lockspitzel Asew) is a 1935 German-Austrian thriller film directed by Phil Jutzi and starring Fritz Rasp, Olga Chekhova, and Hilde von Stolz. It was shot at the Sievering and Rosenhügel Studios in Vienna. The film's sets were designed by the art director Julius von Borsody.

== Synopsis ==
The film narrates the activities of Yevno Azef, a Russian who had worked as an agent provocateur for the Tsarist Okhrana and infiltrated the Socialist Revolutionary Party. Asef had earned the trust of terrorist revolutionary comrades by assassinating top Russian officials but betrayed many comrades, some of whom were executed for involvement and planning of crimes and some by comrades themselves after Azef manipulated them into believing there were traitors to the anti-government cause, such as famous worker's resistance movement leader Gapon.

After being ultimately proven a traitor, Azef fled to Germany using a fake ID provided by the Okhrana still refusing to believe Azef organized the murder of top government officials. While in Germany, Azef coincidentally met a former comrade and asked for support in organizing a fair tribunal, claiming he was falsely accused of treason. He died in hospital in 1918.

== Cast ==
- Fritz Rasp as Lockspitzel Asew
- Olga Chekhova as Tanja Asew, seine Frau
- Hilde von Stolz as Nelly, Chansonette
- Wolfgang Liebeneiner as Wronski
- Ellen Frank as Vera Wronksi, seine Schwester
- Herbert Hübner as Lopuchin, Russischer Polizeigeneral
- Siegfried Schürenberg as Sawinkoff
- Franz Schafheitlin as Urzoff
- Wilhelm H. König as Kaljajew
- Traudl Stark as The Child
- Aruth Wartan
- Otto Hartmann
- Karl Forest
- Gretl Wawra

== Production ==
It was shot in Vienna.

== Works cited ==
- Hull, David (1969). Film in the Third Reich: Art and Propaganda in Nazi Germany. Simon & Schuster. SBN 671214861.

== Bibliography ==
- Bock, Hans-Michael; Bergfelder, Tim, eds. (2009). The Concise Cinegraph: Encyclopaedia of German Cinema. New York: Berghahn Books. ISBN 978-1-57181-655-9.
