= Mother Krause's Journey to Happiness =

1929 film

- Release poster
- Directed by: Phil Jutzi
- Written by: Willy Döll; Jan Fethke
- Starring: Alexandra Schmitt; Holmes Zimmermann; Ilse Trautschold; Gerhard Bienert; Vera Sacharowa; Friedrich Gnaß; Fee Wachsmuth
- Release date: 1929
- Country: Weimar Republic
- Languages: Silent; German intertitles

Mother Krause's Journey to Happiness (German: Mutter Krausens Fahrt ins Glück) is a 1929 German silent drama film directed by Phil Jutzi and starring Alexandra Schmitt, Holmes Zimmermann and Ilse Trautschold. The film was produced by the left-wing Prometheus Film, a German subsidiary of the Soviet company Mezhrabpom-Film. It depicts the cruelty of poverty and depicts Communism as a rescuing force that, alas, reaches Mutter Krause and the child that lives in Krause's apartment too late.

It was shot at the Johannisthal Studios in Berlin.

== Plot ==
Mother Krause's Journey to Happiness (1929)

Mutter Krause and her two adult children, daughter Erna and son Paul, live in a tenement in Wedding, a cramped working-class district of Berlin. With them lives "the Tenant", a petty criminal, his fiancée Friede, a prostitute, and Friede's young child.

Mutter Krause is a quiet, long-suffering old woman who earns what little she can delivering newspapers. However, Paul is unemployed, earns little from ragpicking and often relies on her for money. One day, he spends the money collected from her customers on drink. Mutter Krause pawns her last valuable possession, a treasured memento of her late husband, but still has not enough to satisfy her obligation to her employer, who sacks her and takes her to court.

Erna begins dating Max, a young communist worker, who promises her to help her mother meet her debt. Paul is persuaded to join others to break into the same pawn shop to get money for the debt. When police are alerted, he gets away but is then arrested in front of his mother, who does not know of Max's promise. In despair, Mutter Krause turns on the gas in the apartment and kills herself, along with Friede's child.

== Notes ==
The scene near the end depicting the political rally glorifies the marching forms of the Communist rally-goers.

The original German intertitles are written in Berlin dialect.

== Reception ==
In a list of the 100 most important German films, compiled in 1994 by the Association of German Cinémathèques, Mother Krause's Journey to Happiness was placed at #15.

== Bibliography ==
- Kreimeier, Klaus. The Ufa Story: A History of Germany's Greatest Film Company, 1918-1945. University of California Press, 1999.
