= Housseras =

- Commune
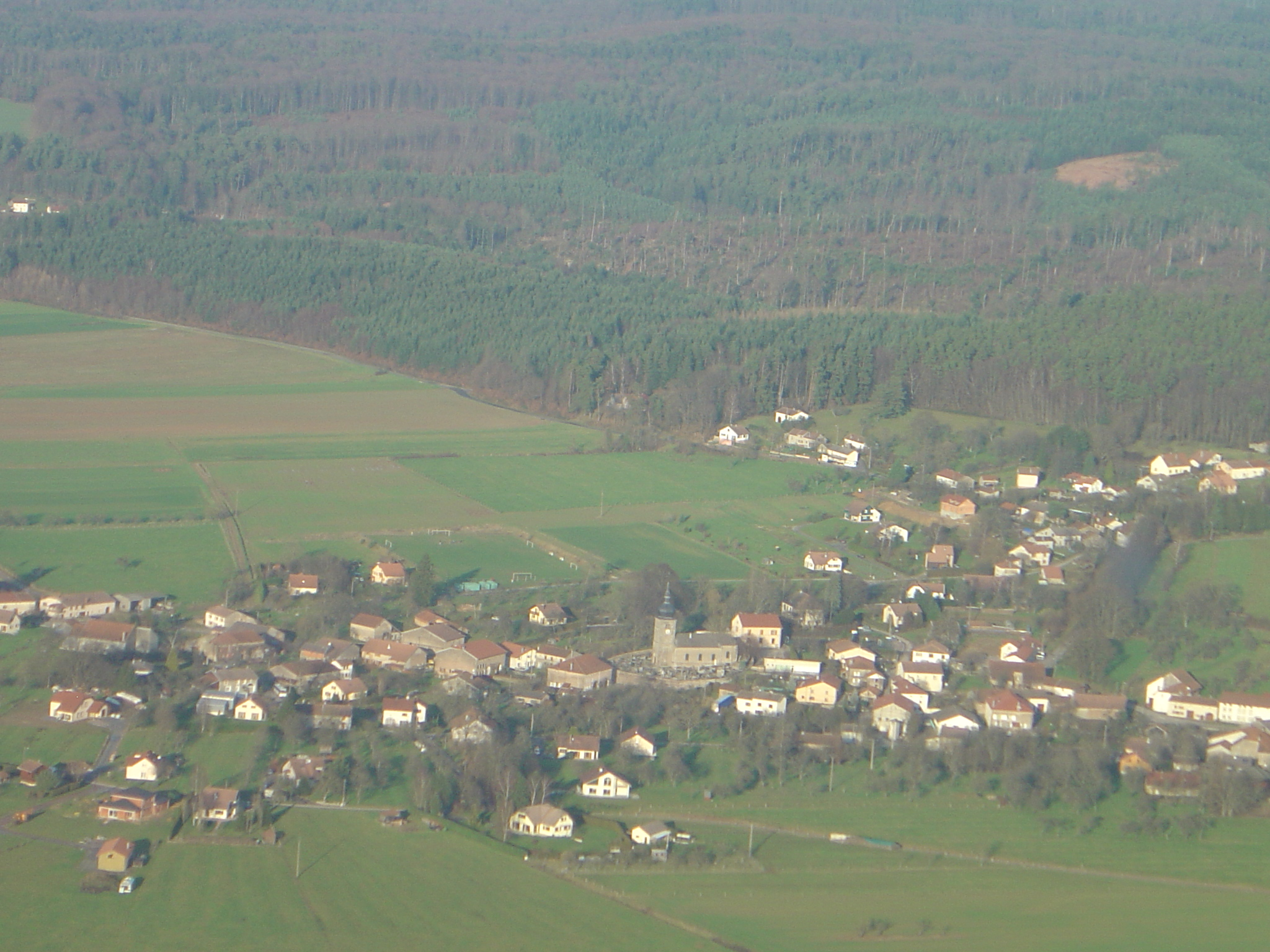
- A general view of Housseras
- Location of Housseras
- Location within France Location within Grand Est
- Coordinates: 48°18′41″N 6°42′48″E
- Country: France
- Region: Grand Est
- Department: Vosges
- Arrondissement: Épinal
- Canton: Saint-Dié-des-Vosges-1
- Intercommunality: CC Région de Rambervillers

Government
  - Mayor (2020–2026): Jean Christophe Tihay
- Area^{1}: 19.61 km^{2} (7.57 sq mi)
- Elevation: 352 m (1,155 ft)
- Highest elevation: 530 m (1,740 ft)
- Lowest elevation: 311 m (1,020 ft)
- Population (2023): 485
  - Density: 24.7/km^{2} (64.1/sq mi)
- Time zone: UTC+01:00 (CET)
  - Summer (DST): UTC+02:00 (CEST)
- INSEE/Postal code: 88243 /88700
- ^{1} French Land Register data, which excludes lakes, ponds, glaciers > 1 km^{2} (0.386 sq mi or 247 acres) and river estuaries.

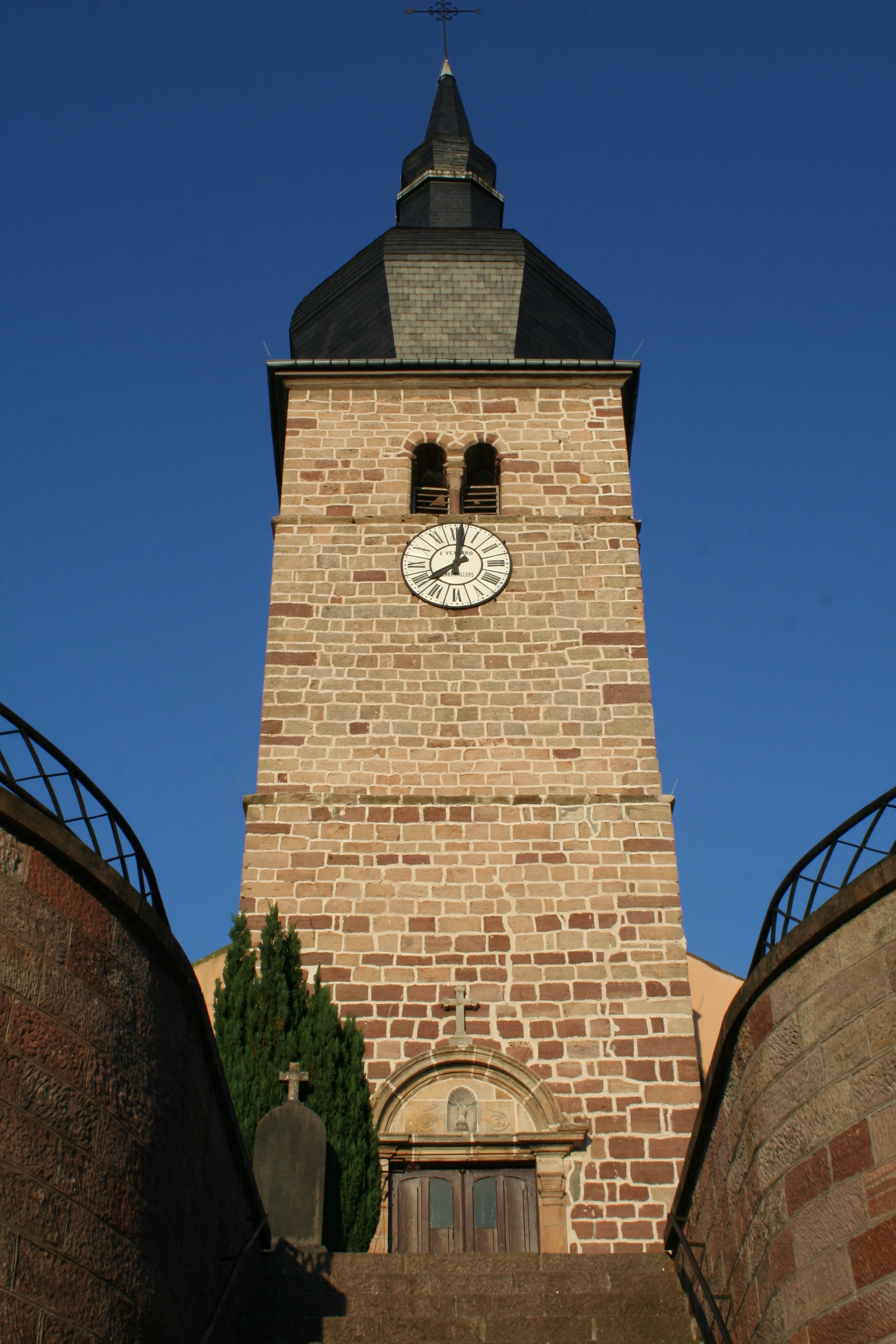
Saint-Pient church

Housseras (French pronunciation: [usʁa]) is a commune in the Vosges department in Grand Est in northeastern France.

== Points of interest ==
- Jardin botanique de Gondremer
- Grave of Wolfgang Döblin (mathematician), and his parents Erna and Alfred Döblin (writer)

== See also ==
- Communes of the Vosges department
