= Zhangluji =

Zhangluji 张炉集镇
- Town
- Location in Shandong Zhangluji (China)
- Coordinates: 36°25′19″N 115°48′08″E
- Country: People's Republic of China
- Province: Shandong
- Prefecture-level city: Liaocheng
- District: Dongchangfu
- Time zone: UTC+8 (China Standard)

Zhangluji (Chinese: 张炉集镇) is a town in Dongchangfu District, Liaocheng, in western Shandong province, China.
