= Jardin botanique de Gondremer =

Private botanical garden in Grand Est, France

Coordinates: 48.2925°N 6.7225°E

The Jardin botanique de Gondremer is a private botanical garden with national collections of rhododendrons and azaleas, kalmia, heathers, and Japanese maples, classified as a Jardin Remarquable by the French ministry of culture. It is located several kilometers east of Autrey and Housseras, Vosges, Grand Est, France, and open at specific periods suitable for the collections; an admission fee is charged.

The garden was begun by Michel and Gisèle Madre in 1974 in a wild and marshy valley, with ponds created for drainage and initial plantings in 1974-1975. Between 1975 and 1990, nearly 2000 plants were introduced, mainly rhododendrons, azaleas, and other Ericaceae, and in 1990 the garden expanded into an adjacent forest area with the addition of a botanical trail about 1 km long. In 1998 its collections of rhododendrons and azaleas, kalmia, heathers, and Japanese maples were recognized as national collections by the Conservatoire Français des Collections Végétales Spécialisées (CCVS).

Today the garden is divided into a botanical area, in the east, and a naturalistic area in the west. It contains about 4,000 plant taxa including 650 rhododendron species, 450 rhododendron hybrids, 500 azalea hybrids, 80 Calluna, 80 Erica, 40 Kalmia, 35 Pieris, 25 Vaccinium, 20 Cassiope, 20 Leucothoe, 15 Andromeda, 15 Phyllodoce, 10 Ledum, and 6 Menziesia. It also contains about 160 varieties of maple trees including 130 cultivars of Acer japonicum and Acer palmatum, 270 types of conifers, and a further 750 varieties of other trees and shrubs, as well as 50 types of vines, and 800 varieties of herbaceous plants.

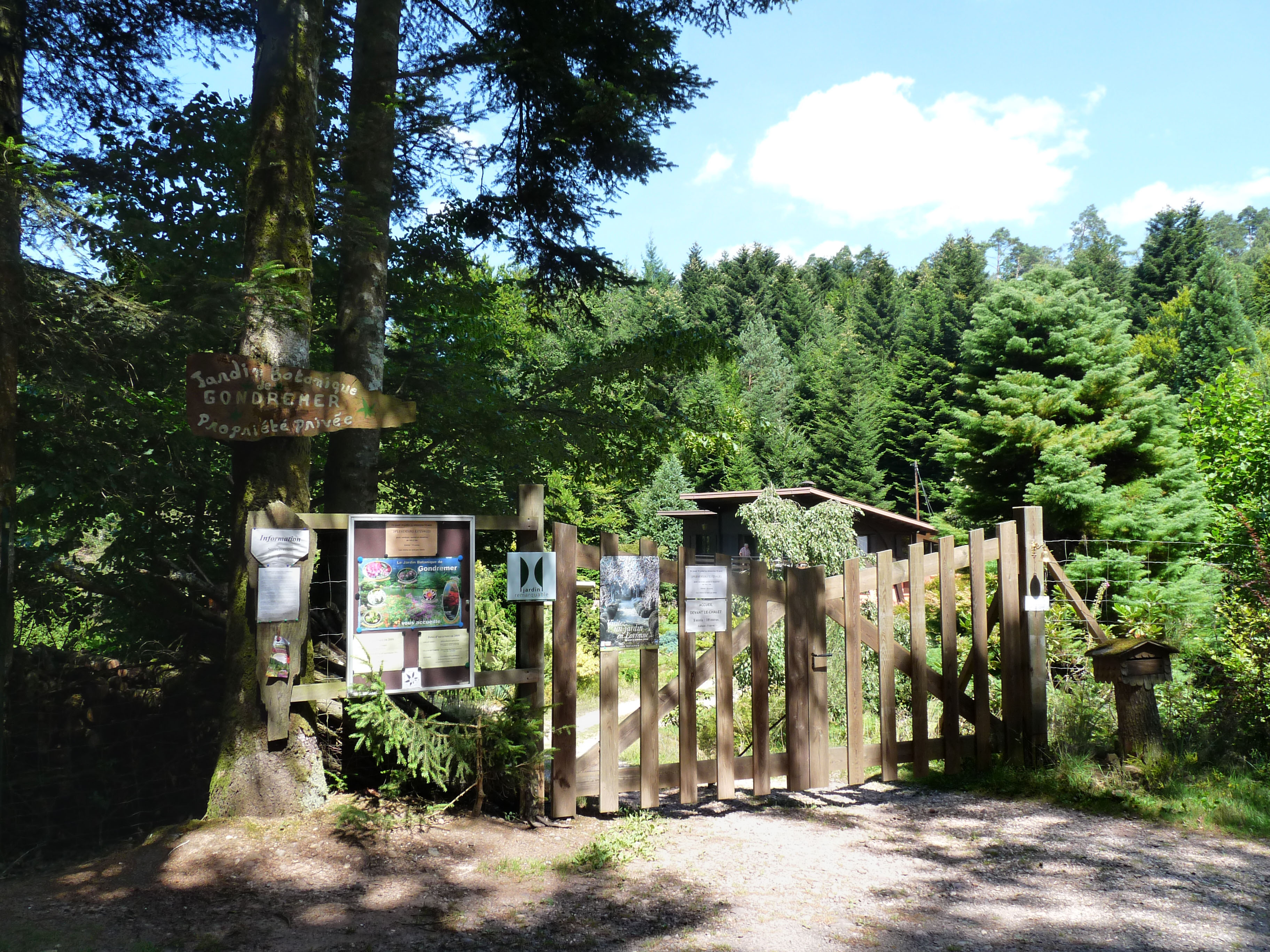
Jardin botanique de Gondremer

== See also ==
- List of botanical gardens in France
