= Douhutun =

Douhutun 斗虎屯镇
- Town
- Location in Shandong Douhutun (China)
- Coordinates: 36°40′03″N 115°50′06″E
- Country: People's Republic of China
- Province: Shandong
- Prefecture-level city: Liaocheng
- District: Dongchangfu
- Time zone: UTC+8 (China Standard)

Douhutun (Chinese: 斗虎屯镇) is a town in Dongchangfu District, Liaocheng, in western Shandong province, China.
