= Phil Jutzi =

German cinematographer and film director

Phil Jutzi (sometimes known as Piel Jutzi) (22 July 1896 – 1 May 1946) was a German cinematographer and film director.

== Biography ==
Born Philipp Jutzi in Altleiningen as the son of a tailor, Jutzi was self-educated. (He seems to have been generally known by the Palatinate dialect form of his given name, Piel, but a lawsuit by Harry Piel forced him to go by "Phil," though many journalists continued to use "Piel.") In 1916 he made posters for a small movie theater in the Black Forest, having been rejected by the military during World War I because of a physical disability. In 1919 he was an administrator of the Internationale Film-Industrie company in Heidelberg, which specialized in detective movies and westerns. In 1923 he married Emmy Philippine Zimmermann, the sister of the actor Holmes Zimmermann (born Johannes Zimmermann, 1900–1957), who acted in seven of his films; in May 1926 a daughter, Gisela, was born.

In 1925 Jutzi moved to Berlin, where he worked as a documentary cameraman for the Communist film company Welt-Film; in 1928/29 he directed the semidocumentary film The Shadow of a Mine. From 1926 he worked as a director for the leftist Prometheus Film, and on the basis of such films as Mother Krause's Journey to Happiness (1929) became known as a leading director of proletarian films. At the beginning of 1928 he became a member of the Communist Party, but left it at the end of 1929.

After the completion of Berlin-Alexanderplatz (1931), based on the Alfred Döblin novel, his political orientation changed drastically. In March 1933 Jutzi joined the Nazi Party, and under the Nazi regime became a prolific director, from 1933 to 1941 directing 49 short films (he was rarely allowed to make feature movies because of his political past). In 1934/35 he directed the German spy film Asew with Fritz Rasp and Olga Chekhova, following it with the Austrian spy drama The Cossack and the Nightingale with Iván Petrovich und Jarmila Novotná. But he was not by any means a renowned director, and continued to have financial difficulties until the end of his life. During the 1940s his health worsened and he became unfit for work. After the end of World War II he returned to his native Altleiningen; he died the following year in Neustadt an der Weinstraße.

== Selected filmography ==
- The Great Opportunity (1925)
- Children's Tragedy (1928)
- The Living Corpse (1929)
- The Shadow of a Mine (1929)
- Mother Krause's Journey to Happiness (1929)
- Die Todeszeche (1930)
- Berlin-Alexanderplatz (1931)
- Eine wie Du (1932/33)
- Asew (1935)
- The Cossack and the Nightingale (1935)
- Shoulder Arms (1939)
