= Tales of a Long Night =

Novel by Alfred Döblin

- Cover of the first edition
- Author: Alfred Döblin
- Original title: Hamlet oder Die lange Nacht nimmt ein Ende
- Language: German
- Genre: novel
- Publisher: Rütten & Loening, East Berlin
- Publication date: 1956
- Publication place: Germany
- Media type: Print (Hardcover & Paperback)
- LC Class: PT2607.O35 H3

Tales of a Long Night (German: Hamlet oder Die lange Nacht nimmt ein Ende) (1956) is the last novel of German author Alfred Döblin. Set in England immediately after the Second World War, the novel narrates the story of Edward Allison, an English soldier who had been badly wounded during the war. Back among his family, Edward must deal with his war trauma, long buried family conflicts, and his destabilized sense of self. The novel treats such themes as the search for the self, guilt and responsibility, the struggle between the sexes, war and violence, and religion, among others.

Döblin wrote the novel between August 1945 and October 1946, although it was not published until a decade later. Upon its 1956 release by the East Berlin publishing house Rütten & Loening, the novel was well received.

The reference to Hamlet in the German title was likely motivated by Döblin's reading of Sigmund Freud's interpretation of Shakespeare's Hamlet.
