= The Cossack and the Nightingale =

- Directed by: Phil Jutzi
- Written by: Paul Frank (novel); Leo Perutz (novel); Georg C. Klaren
- Starring: Jarmila Novotna; Iván Petrovich; Gerda Maurus; Rudolf Klein-Rogge
- Cinematography: Eduard Hoesch
- Edited by: Alwin Elling
- Music by: Willy Schmidt-Gentner
- Production company: Atlantis-Film
- Distributed by: Universal Pictures
- Release date: 2 June 1935
- Country: Austria
- Language: German

The Cossack and the Nightingale (German: Der Kosak und die Nachtigall) is a 1935 Austrian romantic thriller film directed by Phil Jutzi and starring Jarmila Novotna, Iván Petrovich and Gerda Maurus. The film's art direction was by Julius von Borsody.

== Cast ==
- Jarmila Novotna as Vera Starschenska, Sängerin
- Iván Petrovich as Gregor Ogolenski
- Gerda Maurus as Sonja Lubinskaja, called 'B27'
- Rudolf Klein-Rogge as Dschahid-Bey, Tabakgroßhändler
- Herbert Hübner as Dr. Frederik Hammersvelt
- Siegfried Schürenberg as Herr von Tremoliere
- Erich Fiedler as Stanley Shrimp, Maler
- Alexa von Porembsky as Nina, Vera's Maid
- Rudolf Carl as Andruschna, Diener bei Ogolenski
- Fritz Imhoff as Kienhäusl, Veras Impresario
- Franz Schafheitlin as R 12
- Mihail Xantho as Dschahid Beys Sekretär

== Bibliography ==
- Bock, Hans-Michael & Bergfelder, Tim. The Concise CineGraph. Encyclopedia of German Cinema. Berghahn Books, 2009.
