= Ilse Trautschold =

German actress

- Born: 27 February 1906; Berlin, Germany
- Died: 17 May 1991 (aged 85); Berlin, Germany
- Occupation: Actress
- Years active: 1929–1983

Ilse Trautschold (27 February 1906 – 17 May 1991) was a German actress. She appeared in 45 films and television shows between 1929 and 1983.

== Selected filmography ==
- Mother Krause's Journey to Happiness (1929)
- The Empress's Favourite (1936)
- The Green Emperor (1939)
- The Merciful Lie (1939)
- The Beaver Coat (1949)
- The Ambassador (1960)
- Possession (1981)
