= Léo Lania =

Ukrainian journalist, playwright and screenwriter

Leo Lania
- Born: Lazar Herrmann; 13 August 1896; Kharkov, Russian Empire (now Ukraine)
- Died: 9 November 1961 (aged 64–65); Munich, West Germany
- Occupations: Screenwriter, journalist, playwright
- Years active: 1929-1962 (film)

Leo Lania (13 August [O.S. 1 August] 1896 – 9 November 1961) was a journalist, playwright and screenwriter.

He was born Lazar Herrmann to a Jewish family in Kharkov. Although born in Russian Empire, Lania immigrated to Vienna and served in the Austro-Hungarian Army during the First World War. After the war, he became increasingly involved with far-left politics and political theatre. In Germany, he worked for the Communist-affiliated Prometheus Film and wrote The Shadow of a Mine (1929) for the Volksfilmverband. He also produced the screenplay for G. W. Pabst's The Threepenny Opera (1931). During the late Weimar era, Lania worked with the celebrated theatre directors Max Reinhardt and Alexis Granowsky. Lania's play Konjunktur (Oil Boom) premiered in Berlin in 1928, directed by Erwin Piscator, with incidental music by Kurt Weill. Three oil companies fight over the rights to oil production in a primitive Balkan country, and in the process exploit the people and destroy the environment. Weill's songs from this play, like "Die Muschel von Margate" are still performed.

Lania was forced to emigrate from Germany following the Nazi takeover in 1933. He eventually settled in France. He worked on several screenplays, including fellow emigre Robert Wiene's Ultimatum (1938). Following the outbreak of the Second World War, Lania was interned by the Daladier government. Lania subsequently made his way to the United States via Spain and Portugal.

Following the United States' entry into the war, Lania was employed by the Office of War Information. He later returned to Germany and settled in Munich.

== Selected filmography ==
- Um's Taegliche Brot - Hunger in Waldenburg (1929)
- The Shadow of a Mine (1929)
- The Threepenny Opera (1931)
- The Trunks of Mr. O.F. (1931)
- A Woman Alone (1936)
- Ultimatum (1938)
- The Shanghai Drama (1938)
- The Corsican Brothers (1939)
- The White Slave (1939)
- Cose da pazzi (1954)
- Melody of Hate (1962)

== Bibliography ==
- Barton, Ruth. Hedy Lamarr: The Most Beautiful Woman in Film. University Press of Kentucky, 2010.
- Murray, Bruce Arthur. Film and the German Left in the Weimar Republic: From Caligari to Kuhle Wampe. University of Texas Press, 1990.
