= Wolfgang Doeblin =

French-German mathematician (1915–1940)

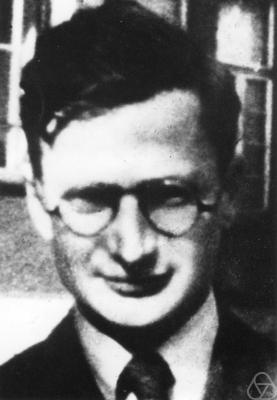
- ca.1938
- Born: 17 March 1915; Berlin, Germany
- Died: 21 June 1940 (aged 25); Housseras, France
- Education: Université de Paris
- Known for: Doeblin's condition for Markov processes, Doeblin's central limit theorem
- Scientific career
- Fields: Mathematics
- Thesis: Sur les propriétés asymptotiques de mouvements régis par certains types de chaînes simples (1938)
- Doctoral advisor: Paul Lévy; Maurice René Fréchet

Wolfgang Doeblin, known in France as Vincent Doblin (17 March 1915 – 21 June 1940), was a French-German mathematician.

== Life ==
A native of Berlin, Wolfgang was the son of the Jewish-German novelist and physician, Alfred Döblin, and Erna Reiss. His family escaped from Nazi Germany to France where he became a French citizen. Studying probability theory at the Université de Paris under Fréchet, he quickly made a name for himself as a gifted theorist. He received his doctorate at age 23.

Drafted in November 1938, after refusing to be exempted from military service, he was a soldier in the French army when World War II broke out in 1939, and was stationed at Givet, in the Ardennes, as a telephone operator. There, he wrote down his latest work on the Chapman–Kolmogorov equation, and sent this as a "pli cacheté" (sealed envelope) to the French Academy of Sciences. His company, sent to the sector of the Saare on the ligne Maginot in April 1940, was caught in the German attack in the Ardennes in May, withdrew to the Vosges, and capitulated on 22 June 1940. Finding himself cut off from his unit and with Wehrmacht troops approaching to take him prisoner, Doeblin burned his mathematical notes and then shot himself on 21 June in a barn near the village of Housseras (a small village near Epinal) in the Vosges.

He was initially buried as an unknown soldier in the village cemetery; identification of his remains not taking place until 1944. Following their deaths his parents were buried in Housseras beside him in 1957.

== Legacy ==
The sealed envelope was opened in 2000, revealing that Doeblin had obtained major results on the Chapman-Kolmogorov equation and the theory of diffusion processes.

His life was the subject of a 2007 movie by Agnes Handwerk and Harrie Willems, A Mathematician Rediscovered.

When he became a French citizen in 1938, he chose the official name of Vincent Doblin. However, he later chose to sign his papers as Wolfgang Doeblin and it is under this name that all his mathematical papers and professional letters were published.
