= Asphalt literature =

German literary term

Asphalt literature is a term that was used in Germany to refer to "metropolitan literature that is no longer rooted in its homeland". The term was first used in 1918, and became popular in the Third Reich when Joseph Goebbels used it in his speech on 10 May 1933 at the burning of books on Berlin's Opernplatz. Meyer's Lexikon defined asphalt literature in the 1936 edition as a "designation for rootless urban writers", which before 1933 had been a "phenomenon of fashion and decay, partly of foreign origin".

Asphalt literature included works by Alfred Döblin, Bertolt Brecht, Lion Feuchtwanger, Erich Kästner and other writers who were persecuted by the Nazi regime.

== Literature ==
- Thomas B. Schumann: Asphaltliteratur. 45 Aufsätze und Hinweise zu im Dritten Reich verfemten und verfolgten Auforen (Bibliothek Anpassung und Wiederstand). Klaus Guhl, 1983, ISBN 978-3-88220-152-9
