= The Shadow of a Mine =

1929 film

- Directed by: Phil Jutzi
- Written by: Léo Lania
- Starring: Holmes Zimmermann; Sybille Schloß
- Cinematography: Phil Jutzi
- Production companies: Weltfilm; Volksfilmverband
- Release date: 16 March 1929
- Country: Germany
- Languages: Silent; German intertitles

The Shadow of a Mine is a 1929 German silent drama film directed by Phil Jutzi and starring Holmes Zimmermann and Sybille Schloß. Its original German title is Um's tägliche Brot (Our Daily Bread). It is also known as Hunger in Waldenburg.

The film was produced by the left-wing Volksfilmverband in partnership with Weltfilm and the Theater am Schiffbauerdamm. Using a docudrama format, the film highlights the hardships faced by Silesian coal miners in Waldenburg. It premiered at the Tauenzienpalast in Berlin on 16 March 1929.

The film was screened in Britain by the London Workers' Film Society in December 1929. This is now the only print of the film which survives.

== Cast ==
- Holmes Zimmermann as Junger Weber
- Sybille Schloß

== Bibliography ==
- Bock, Hans-Michael & Bergfelder, Tim. The Concise CineGraph. Encyclopedia of German Cinema. Berghahn Books, 2009.
- Murray, Bruce Arthur. Film and the German Left in the Weimar Republic: From Caligari to Kuhle Wampe. University of Texas Press, 1990.
