= Houying =

Houying 侯营镇
- Town
- Location in Shandong Houying (China)
- Coordinates: 36°24′06″N 115°52′54″E
- Country: People's Republic of China
- Province: Shandong
- Prefecture-level city: Liaocheng
- District: Dongchangfu
- Time zone: UTC+8 (China Standard)

Houying (Chinese: 侯营镇) is a town in Dongchangfu District, Liaocheng, in western Shandong province, China.
