= Shazhen =

Shazhen 沙镇镇
- Town
- Location in Shandong Shazhen (China)
- Coordinates: 36°20′03″N 115°47′01″E
- Country: People's Republic of China
- Province: Shandong
- Prefecture-level city: Liaocheng
- District: Dongchangfu
- Time zone: UTC+8 (China Standard)

Shazhen (Chinese: 沙镇镇) is a town in Dongchangfu District, Liaocheng, in western Shandong province, China.
