= Siegfried Schürenberg =

German actor (1900–1993)

- Born: Siegfried Wittig; 12 January 1900; Detmold, Germany
- Died: 31 August 1993 (aged 93); Berlin, Germany
- Occupation: Actor
- Years active: 1933–1974

Siegfried Schürenberg (12 January 1900 – 31 August 1993) was a German film actor. He appeared in more than 80 films between 1933 and 1974. He was born in Detmold, Germany and died in Berlin, Germany in 1993, at age 93.

Although Schürenberg never played leading roles, he was a well-known supporting actor who played the role of Scotland Yard director Sir John in numerous of the German Edgar Wallace crime films during the 1960s. Schürenberg was also a busy dubbing actor, for example as the German voice for Clark Gable in most of his films, including Rhett Butler in Gone with the Wind.

== Selected filmography ==
- The Marathon Runner (1933)
- A Man Wants to Get to Germany (1934) - Conner, British friend
- Master of the World (1934) - Werner Baumann
- Asew (1935) - Sawinkoff
- The Cossack and the Nightingale (1935) - Herr von Tremoliere
- Forget Me Not (1935) - Hellmut von Ahrens - Erster Offizier
- The Higher Command (1935) - Lord Beckhurst
- The Traitor (1936) - Neumann
- Men Without a Fatherland (1937) - Hauptmann Angermann
- To New Shores (1937) - Kapitän Gilbert
- The Man Who Was Sherlock Holmes (1937)
- Nights in Andalusia (1938) - Rittmeister Moraleda
- Rubber (1938) - Ein Mitglied der Konferenz (uncredited)
- The Green Emperor (1939) - Verteidiger
- Escape in the Dark (1939) - Werkslaborant Dr. Marlow
- Madame Butterfly (1939) - Paul Fieri
- The Sensational Casilla Trial (1939) - James, ihr Dienter
- Fahrt ins Leben (1940) - 1. Offizier
- Am Abend auf der Heide (1941) - Jensen
- Conchita and the Engineer (1954)
- The Plot to Assassinate Hitler (1955) - Generaloberst Friedrich Fromm
- Du mein stilles Tal (1955) - Herr Widmeier
- Alibi (1955) - Vorsitzender des Gerichts
- Pulverschnee nach Übersee (1956) - Mister Frank Jones (narrator, uncredited)
- My Father, the Actor (1956) - Gustav, Intendant
- The Story of Anastasia (1956) - Amerikanischer Anwalt
- A Heart Returns Home (1956) - Dr. Weißbach
- Stresemann (1957) - Lord d'Abernon
- Made in Germany (1957) - Cullampton Bubble
- Glücksritter (1957) - Brack
- The Night of the Storm (1957) - Herr Herterich
- Der Stern von Afrika (1957) - Rektor
- Different from You and Me (1957) - Staatsanwalt
- Goodbye, Franziska (1957) - Harris
- Gejagt bis zum Morgen (1957) - Polizeiinspektor
- Die Schönste (1957) - Wiedemann
- Lilli (1958) - Holland
- Das verbotene Paradies (1958) - Direktor Krailing
- As Long as the Heart Still Beats (1958) - Dr. Wieler
- The Journey (1959) - Von Rachlitz
- And That on Monday Morning (1959) - Herr von Schmitz
- The Rest Is Silence (1959) - Johannes Claudius
- Menschen im Hotel (1959) - Dr. Behrend
- Die Brücke (1959) - Lt. Colonel
- Old Heidelberg (1959) - Staatsminister Haugk
- Ich schwöre und gelobe (1960) - Krankenhausdirektor (uncredited)
- The Avenger (1960) - Maj. Staines
- Frau Irene Besser (1961)
- The Last Chapter (1961) - Konsul Ruben
- The Door with Seven Locks (1962) - Sir John
- The Inn on the River (1962) - Sir John
- The Squeaker (1963) - Sir Geoffrey Fielding
- The Indian Scarf (1963) - Sir Henry Hockbridge
- Room 13 (1964) - Sir John
- The Curse of the Hidden Vault (1964) - Sir John
- Der Hexer (1964) - Sir John
- Neues vom Hexer (1965) - Sir John
- The Sinister Monk (1965) - Sir John
- The Hunchback of Soho (1966) - Sir John
- The Trygon Factor (1966) - Sir John - German Version (uncredited)
- The Oldest Profession (1967) - (segment "Belle époque, La")
- Creature with the Blue Hand (1967) - Sir John
- The Jungle Book (1967) - Shere Khan (voice, German Version)
- The College Girl Murders (1967) - Sir John
- The Hound of Blackwood Castle (1968) - Sir John
- Asterix and Cleopatra (1968) - Julius Caesar (German version, narrator)
- Klassenkeile (1969) - Chefredakteur Berg
- Herzblatt oder Wie sag' ich's meiner Tochter? (1969) - Rektor
- The Sex Nest(1970) - Werner Zibell alias Der General
- Gentlemen in White Vests (1970) - Kommissar Berg
- Musik, Musik - da wackelt die Penne (1970) - Minister
- Who Laughs Last, Laughs Best (1971) - General Pusch
- The Devil Came from Akasava (1971) - Sir Philip
- The Body in the Thames (1971) - Sir John
- The Love Keys (1971) - Gottwald Baumgartner
- X312 - Flug zur Hölle (1971) - Bankpräsident Alberto Rupprecht
- The Deadly Avenger of Soho (1972) - Dr. Bladmore
- When Mother Went on Strike (1974) - Onkel Walter Habinger
- The Immortal Bachelor (1975) - Man at sewer (uncredited) (final film role)
