= The Green Emperor =

1939 film

- Directed by: Paul Mundorf
- Written by: Hans Meddin (novel); Frank Thiess; Géza von Cziffra
- Produced by: Karl Schulz
- Starring: Gustav Diessl; Carola Höhn; René Deltgen
- Cinematography: Willy Winterstein
- Edited by: Axel von Werner
- Music by: Hans Ebert
- Production company: UFA
- Distributed by: UFA
- Release date: 13 February 1939
- Running time: 88 minutes
- Country: Germany
- Language: German
- Budget: 541,000 Reichsmarks

The Green Emperor (German: Der grüne Kaiser) is a 1939 German crime film directed by Paul Mundorf and starring Gustav Diessl, Carola Höhn and René Deltgen. It was inspired by the real-life case of a Belgian financier who had gone missing during a flight across the English Channel.

The film's sets were designed by the art director Erich Kettelhut. Location shooting took place in the countryside outside Berlin during 1938. It premiered in Vienna in February 1939.

== Synopsis ==
A shady British businessmen frames his pilot for his staged murder. After being released from prison, the pilot attempts to track down his former employer who is still alive.

== Cast ==
- Gustav Diessl as Henry Miller / Hendrik Mylius
- Carola Höhn as Joana Martinez
- René Deltgen as Jan Karsten
- Ellen Bang as Eva Latour
- Aribert Wäscher as Bankier Vandermer
- Hilde Hildebrand as Nora
- Paul Westermeier as Hoyens
- Alexander Engel as Sekretär Favard
- Albert Hörrmann as Marcel Carraux
- Hans Leibelt as Picard
- Hans Halder as Bankier Jaquine
- Otto Matthies as Agent van't Hoff
- Eduard von Winterstein as Gerichtsvorsitzender im 2. Prozeß
- Edwin Jürgensen as Prosecutor in the first trial
- Franz Schafheitlin as Prosecutor in the second trial
- Erwin Biegel as Diener Pieter auf der Fazenda
- Ilse Trautschold as Hoysens Sekretärin
- Ingolf Kuntze as Gerichtsvorsitzender im 1. Prozeß
- Siegfried Schürenberg as Defense lawyer
- Bruno Hübner as Geschworener
- Aribert Grimmer as Geschworener
- Walther Süssenguth as Geschworener
- Eric Helgar as Singender Arbeiter auf der Fazenda
- Erich Fiedler as Reporter

== Bibliography ==
- Waldman, Harry (2008). Nazi Films in America, 1933–1942. McFarland. ISBN 978-0-7864-3861-7.
