= The Three Leaps of Wang Lun =

1915 novel by Alfred Döblin

- Cover of the first edition
- Author: Alfred Döblin
- Original title: Die drei Sprünge des Wang-lun
- Translator: C.D. Godwin
- Language: German
- Genre: Historical novel
- Publisher: S. Fischer
- Publication date: 1915/1916
- Publication place: Germany
- Media type: Print (Hardcover and paperback)

The Three Leaps of Wang Lun (Die drei Sprünge des Wang-lun) is a historical novel by the German author Alfred Döblin that narrates upheaval and revolution in 18th-century China. Published in 1916 (although back-dated to 1915), this epic historical novel was Döblin's third novel (although it was the first to be published as a book). It earned him the Fontane Prize. Favorably received by critics, who praised its detailed and exotic depictions of China, it was a literary breakthrough for Döblin. Wang Lun also had an influence on younger German writers, including Lion Feuchtwanger, Anna Seghers and Bertolt Brecht; for the latter, it provided an impulse for the development of the theory of epic theatre. In commercial sales, it is Döblin's most successful novel after Berlin Alexanderplatz. The title of the novel refers to the rebel leader Wang Lun.
