= Tangyi, Shandong =

Tangyi 堂邑镇
- Town
- Location in Shandong Tangyi (China)
- Coordinates: 36°29′19″N 115°46′35″E
- Country: People's Republic of China
- Province: Shandong
- Prefecture-level city: Liaocheng
- District: Dongchangfu
- Time zone: UTC+8 (China Standard)

Tangyi (Chinese: 堂邑镇) is a town in Dongchangfu District, Liaocheng, in western Shandong province, China.
