= Dongchangfu, Liaocheng =

Dongchangfu 东昌府区
- District
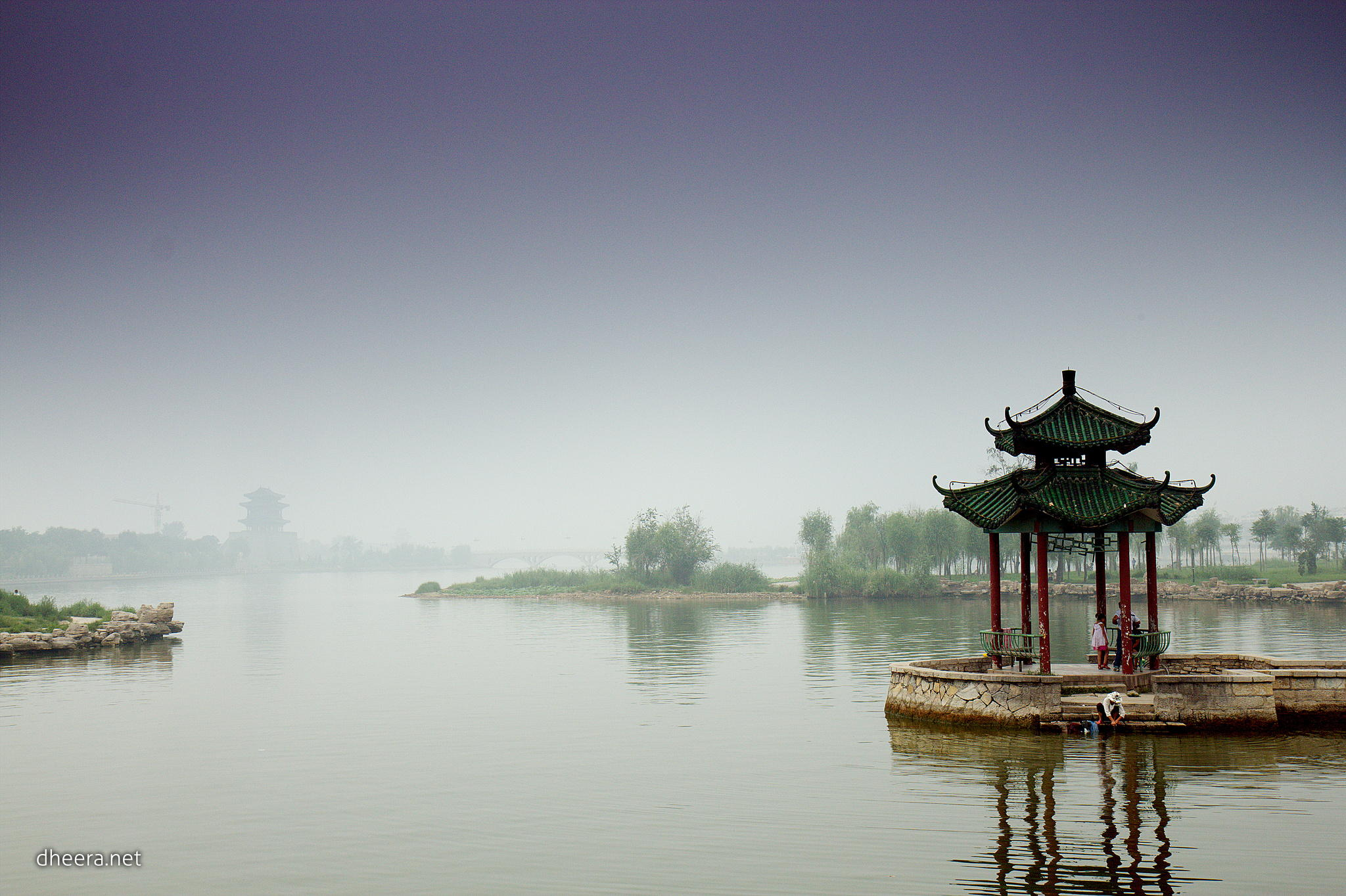
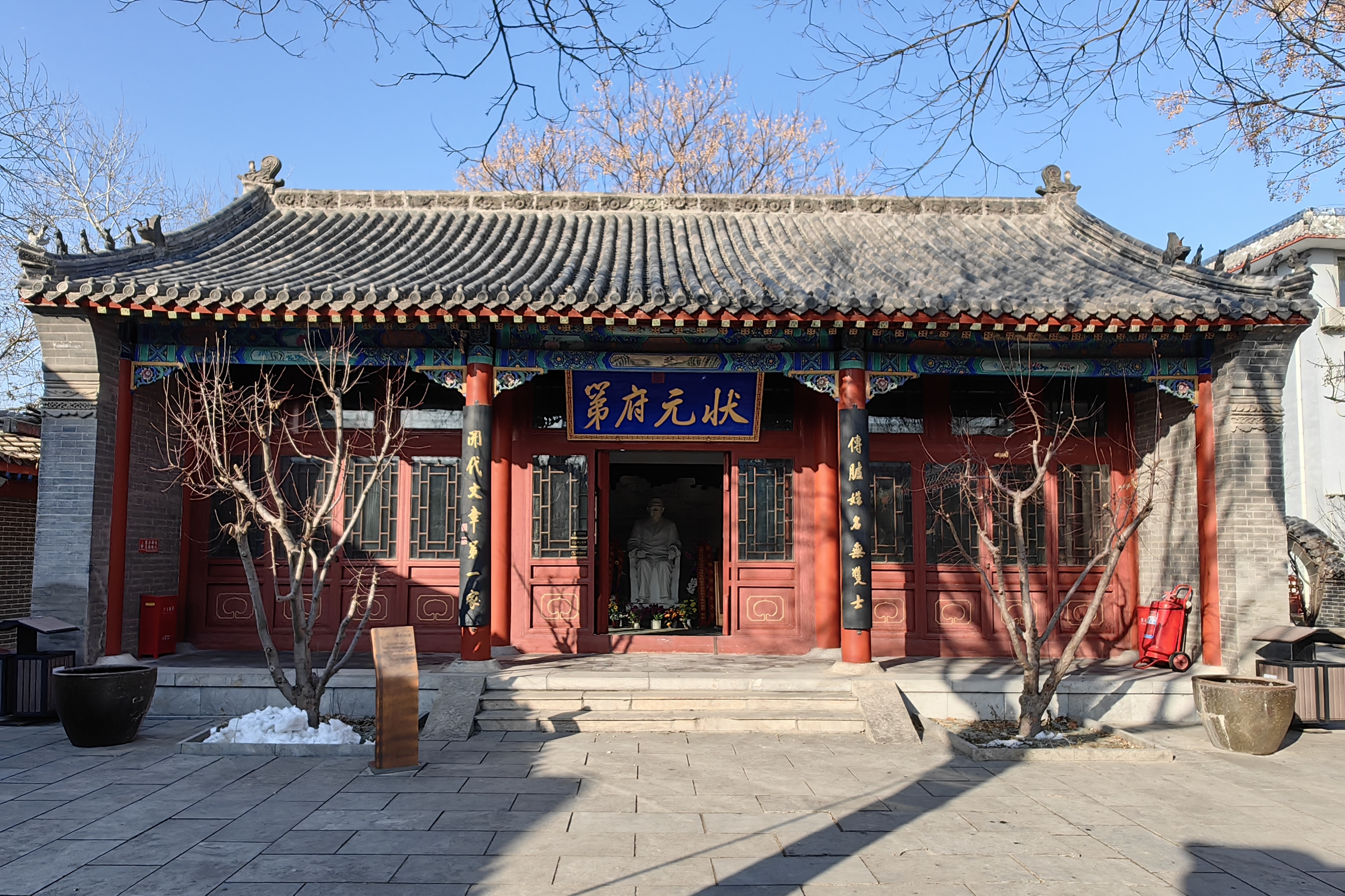
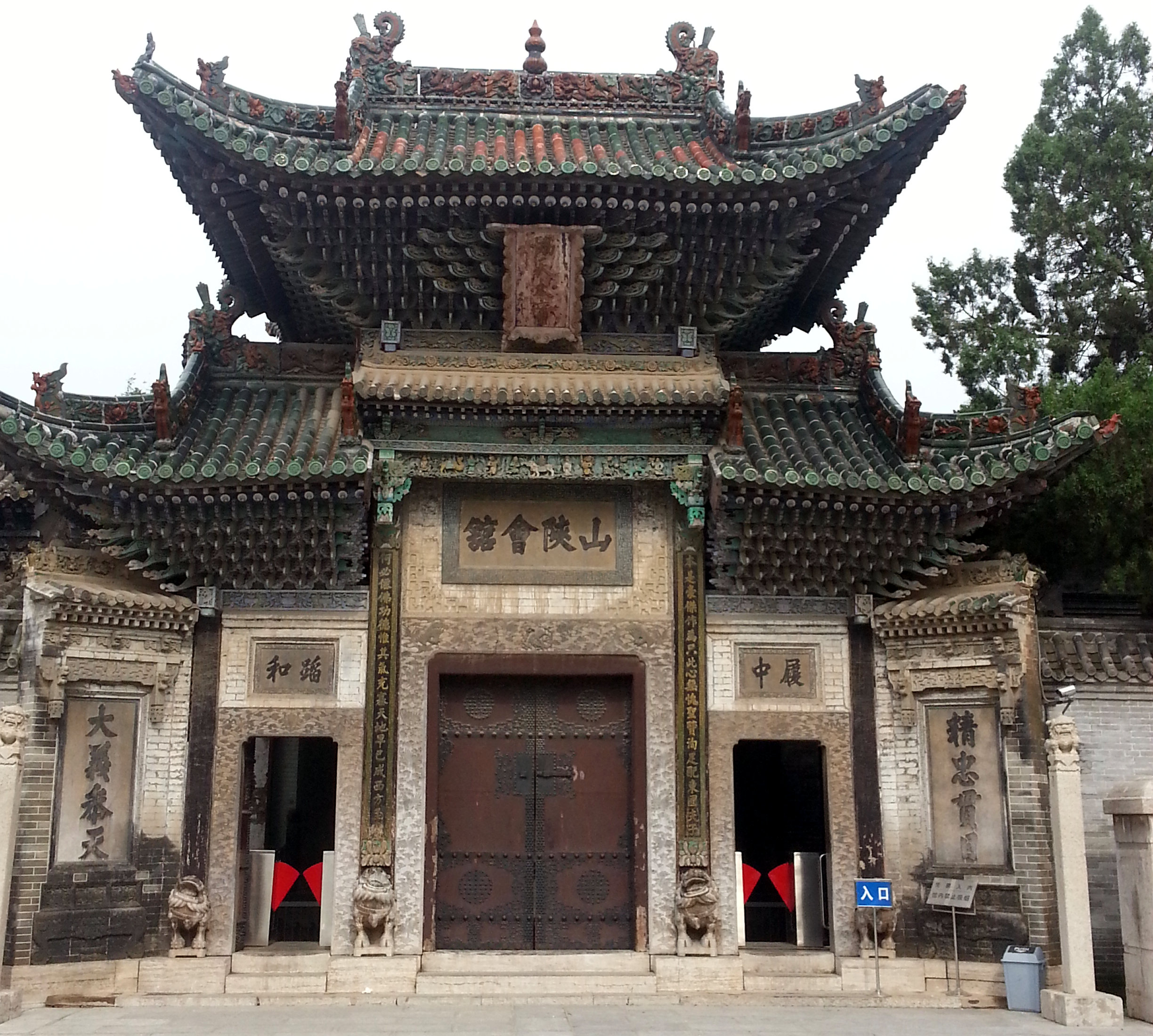
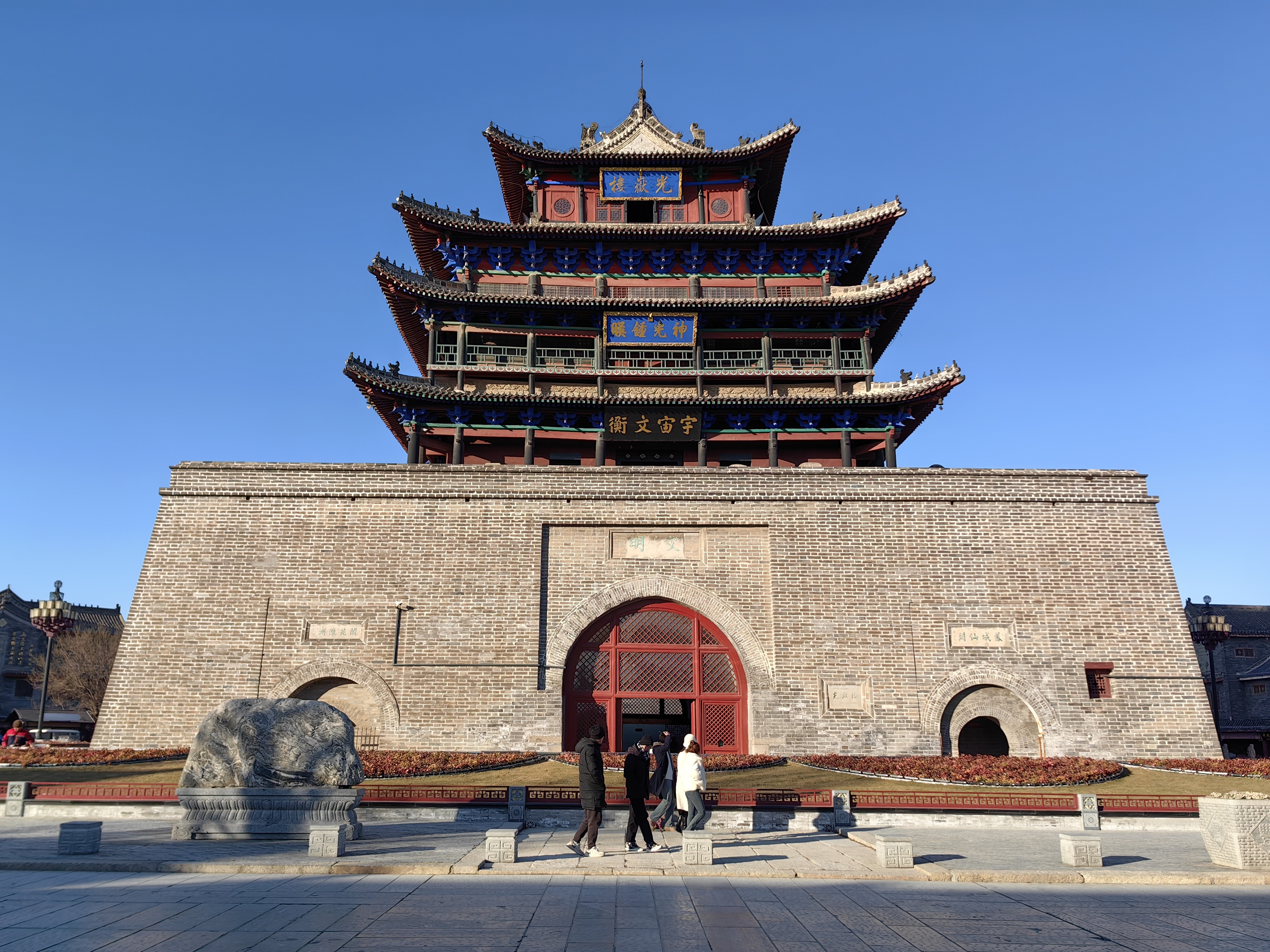
- Dongchang Lake Fu Famliy's Ancestral Temple Shanshan Assembly Hall Guangyue Tower

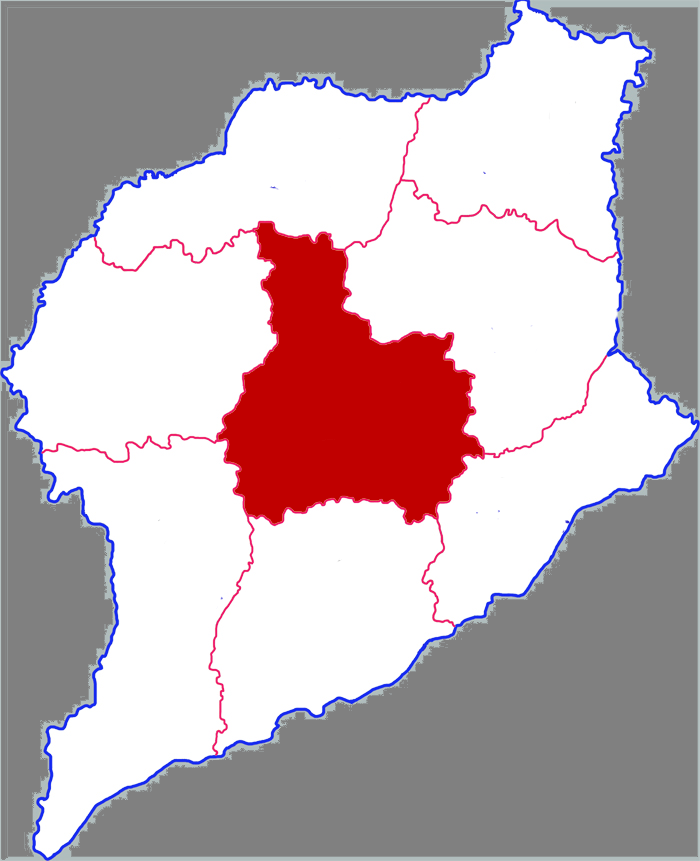
- Dongchangfu in Liaocheng

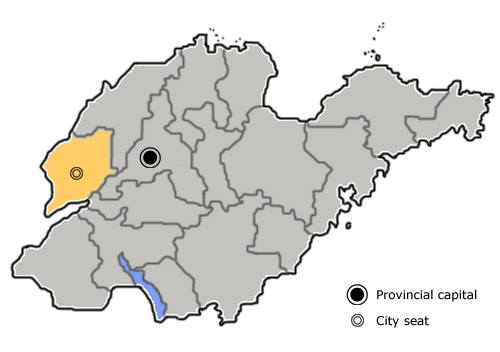
- Liaocheng in Shandong
- Coordinates: 36°26′05″N 115°59′18″E
- Country: People's Republic of China
- Province: Shandong
- Prefecture-level city: Liaocheng

Area
  - Total: 1,443 km^{2} (557 sq mi)

Population (2019)
  - Total: 904,700
  - Density: 627.0/km^{2} (1,624/sq mi)
- Time zone: UTC+8 (China Standard)
- Postal code: 252000

Dongchangfu (simplified Chinese: 东昌府区; traditional Chinese: 東昌府區; pinyin: Dōngchāngfǔ Qū) is a district of the city of Liaocheng, Shandong province, China. It is administered by Liaocheng. It has an area of 1,254 km^{2} (484 sq mi) and around 1 million inhabitants (2003).

== Administrative divisions ==
As of 2012, this District is divided to 10 subdistricts, 8 towns and 2 townships.

Subdistricts

- Gulou Subdistrict (古楼街道)
- Liuyuan Subdistrict (柳园街道)
- Xinqu Subdistrict (新区街道)
- Huxi Subdistrict (湖西街道)
- Daokoupu Subdistrict (道口铺街道)
- Yansi Subdistrict (阎寺街道)
- Fenghuang Subdistrict (凤凰街道)
- Beicheng Subdistrict (北城街道)
- Dongcheng Subdistrict (东城街道)
- Jiangguantun Subdistrict (蒋官屯街道)

Towns

- Houying (侯营镇)
- Shazhen (沙镇镇)
- Tangyi (堂邑镇)
- Liangshui (梁水镇)
- Douhutun (斗虎屯镇)
- Zhengjia (郑家镇)
- Zhangluji (张炉集镇)
- Yuji (于集镇)

Townships

- Xuying Township (许营乡)
- Zhulaozhuang Township (朱老庄乡)
