= Maria Bard =

German actress

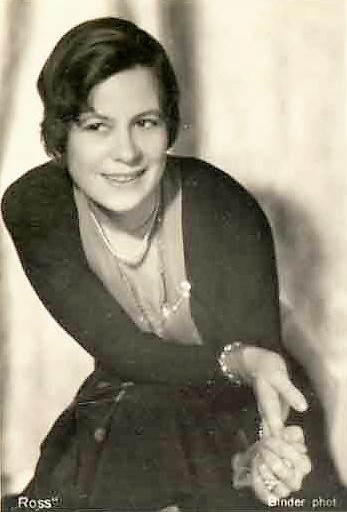
- Bard c. 1925
- Born: 7 July 1900; Schwerin, German Empire
- Died: 8 April 1944 (aged 43); Potsdam, Nazi Germany
- Occupation: Actress
- Years active: 1924–1942 (film)
- Spouses: Werner Krauss (m. 1931; div. 1940) Hannes Stelzer (m. 1940; died 1944)

Maria Bard (7 July 1900 – 8 April 1944) was a German stage actress, who made several films in the silent era for Rimax, her first husband Wilhelm Graaff's company.

By 1930, her marriage with Graaff was over, and she appeared with Werner Krauss in the stage production of Der Kaiser von Amerika or The King of America. Bard and Krauss became romantically involved. When Krauss' wife learned of their affair, she died by suicide. In 1931, Bard and Krauss married.

Bard's third husband was the actor Hannes Stelzer.

Bard died by suicide in April 1944, reportedly for political reasons.

== Selected filmography ==
- Berlin-Alexanderplatz (1931)
- Man Without a Name (1932)
- Premiere (1937)
- Capers (1937)
- Above All Else in the World (1941)
