= Berlin-Alexanderplatz (1931 film) =

1931 film directed by Phil Jutzi

- Directed by: Phil Jutzi
- Written by: Alfred Döblin; Karlheinz Martin; Hans Wilhelm
- Based on: Berlin Alexanderplatz by Alfred Döblin
- Produced by: Arnold Pressburger; William A. Szekeley
- Starring: Heinrich George; Maria Bard; Margarete Schlegel
- Cinematography: Nicolas Farkas; Erich Giese
- Edited by: Geza Pollatschik
- Music by: Allan Gray
- Production company: Cine-Allianz Tonfilm
- Distributed by: Süd-Film
- Release date: 8 October 1931
- Running time: 90 minutes
- Country: Germany
- Language: German

Berlin-Alexanderplatz or The Story of Franz Biberkopf (German: Die Geschichte vom Franz Biberkopf) is a 1931 German drama film directed by Phil Jutzi and starring Heinrich George, Maria Bard and Margarete Schlegel. It was adapted from the 1929 novel of the same title by Alfred Döblin, who also co-wrote the screenplay.

== Plot ==
A blue collar Berliner and small-time criminal recently released from prison finds himself being drawn into the Berlin underworld of the 1920s after his prostitute lover is murdered.

"Yet, despite social upheaval, ...the good among the working class still prove able to live an honest and decent life."

== Production ==
It was filmed on various locations around Berlin including the Alexanderplatz. Jutzi cut out much of the novel's complex story, preferring to focus on just one character.

The Film Review Board released the film on 30 September 1931, but with the restriction that it was forbidden for young people. The premiere took place on 8 October 1931 in the Berlin Capitol am Zoo. The film was distributed by Südfilm AG (Berlin).

== Cast ==
- Heinrich George as Franz Biberkopf
- Maria Bard as Cilly
- Margarete Schlegel as Sonja / Mieze
- Bernhard Minetti as Reinhold
- Gerhard Bienert as Klempner-Karl
- Albert Florath as Pums
- Paul Westermeier as Henschke
- Jakob Tiedtke as Guest at Henschke
- Hans Deppe as Guest at Henschke
- Käthe Haack as Schwester Paula
- Julius Falkenstein as Dieb
- Jakob Tiedtke as Gast bei Henschke
- Siegfried Berisch
- Karel Štěpánek
- Ernst Behmer
- Paul Rehkopf
- Anna Müller-Lincke
- Heinrich Schroth
- Heinrich Gretler
- Willi Schur
- Walter Werner
- Karl Harbacher
- Franz Weber
- Paul Kemp

== Critical response ==
The New York Times's Mordaunt Hall praised the film's acting but was critical of its story, which he characterized it as "unrelieved and sluggish."

Leonard Maltin was enthusiastic: "Ambitious, fascinating early filmization of Alfred Döblin's epic novel of Germany between the wars, centering on the plight of Franz Biberkopf (George), a basically decent but deeply flawed Everyman. Reflects the dreary economic reality of post-WW 1 Germany and offers a peek into Berlin street life just before Hitler came to power."

In a list of the 100 most important German films, compiled in 1994 by the Association of German Cinémathèques, Berlin-Alexanderplatz was placed at #30.

== Bibliography ==
- Murray, Bruce Arthur (1990). Film and the German Left in the Weimar Republic: From Caligari to Kuhle Wampe. Austin: University of Texas Press. ISBN 978-0-292-72465-5.
- Reimer, Robert C.; Reimer, Carol J. (2010). The A to Z of German Cinema. Lanham, MD: Scarecrow Press. ISBN 978-0-8108-7611-8.
