= November 1918: A German Revolution =

Books by Alfred Döblin

- Cover of the first edition of the first volume
- Author: Alfred Döblin
- Original title: November 1918, eine deutsche Revolution
- Language: German
- Genre: Historical novel
- Publication date: 1937–1943
- Publication place: Germany
- Media type: Print (hardcover & paperback)

November 1918: A German Revolution (German: November 1918, eine deutsche Revolution) is a tetralogy of novels by German writer Alfred Döblin about the German Revolution of 1918–1919. The four volumes—Vol. I: Bürger und Soldaten (Citizens and Soldiers), Vol. II Verratenes Volk (A People Betrayed), Vol. III, Heimkehr der Fronttruppen (Return of the Frontline Troops), and Vol. IV, Karl und Rosa (Karl and Rosa)—together comprise the most significant work from Döblin's period of exile (1933–1945). The work was highly praised by figures such as Bertolt Brecht, and critic Gabriele Sander has described the tetralogy as representing the culmination of Döblin's work in the genre of the historical novel.
