= Alfred Döblin =

German novelist, essayist, and doctor (1878–1957)

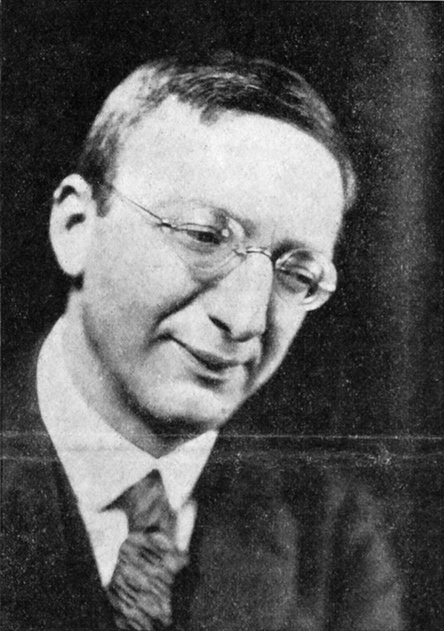
- Döblin c. 1930
- Born: Bruno Alfred Döblin; 10 August 1878; Stettin, Pomerania, German Empire (now Szczecin, Poland)
- Died: 26 June 1957 (aged 78); Emmendingen, West Germany
- Occupations: Writer, doctor
- Spouse: Erna Reiss
- Children: Bodo Kunke; Peter Döblin; Wolfgang Doeblin; Klaus Döblin; Stephan Döblin
- Relatives: Hugo Döblin (brother)
- Writing career
- Pen name: Linke Poot
- Period: 20th century
- Genres: Novel, essay
- Notable works: Berlin Alexanderplatz, The Three Leaps of Wang Lun, Wallenstein, Berge Meere und Giganten, Manas, November 1918: A German Revolution, Tales of a Long Night

Bruno Alfred Döblin (German: [ˈalfʁeːt døːˈbliːn]; 10 August 1878 – 26 June 1957) was a German novelist, essayist, and doctor, best known for his novel Berlin Alexanderplatz (1929). A prolific writer whose œuvre spans more than half a century and a wide variety of literary movements and styles, Döblin is one of the most important figures of German literary modernism. His complete works comprise over a dozen novels ranging in genre from historical novels to science fiction to novels about the modern metropolis; several dramas, radio plays, and screenplays; a true crime story; a travel account; two book-length philosophical treatises; scores of essays on politics, religion, art, and society; and numerous letters—his complete works, republished by Deutscher Taschenbuch Verlag and Fischer Verlag, span more than thirty volumes. His first published novel, Die drei Sprünge des Wang-lung (The Three Leaps of Wang Lun), appeared in 1915 and his final novel, Hamlet oder Die lange Nacht nimmt ein Ende (Tales of a Long Night) was published in 1956, one year before his death.

Born in Stettin, Germany (now Szczecin, Poland), to assimilated Jews, Döblin moved with his mother and siblings to Berlin when he was ten years old after his father had abandoned them. Döblin would live in Berlin for almost all of the next forty-five years, engaging with such key figures of the prewar and Weimar-era German cultural scene as Herwarth Walden and the circle of Expressionists, Bertolt Brecht, and Thomas Mann. Only a few years after his rise to literary celebrity with the 1929 publication of Berlin Alexanderplatz, Döblin was forced into exile by the rise of the Nazi dictatorship. Works by Döblin were also considered "Asphalt literature". He spent 1933–1940 in France and then was forced to flee again at the start of the Second World War. Like many other German émigrés he spent the war years in Los Angeles, where he converted to Catholicism. He moved to West Germany after the war but did not feel at home in postwar Germany's conservative cultural climate and returned to France. His final years were marked by poor health and financial difficulties, and his literary work was met with relative neglect.

Despite the canonic status of Berlin Alexanderplatz, Döblin is often characterized as an under-recognized or even as a forgotten author; while his work has received increasing critical attention (mostly in German) over the last few decades, he is much less well known by the reading public than other German novelists such as Thomas Mann, Günter Grass or Franz Kafka.

== Life ==
=== Early life ===
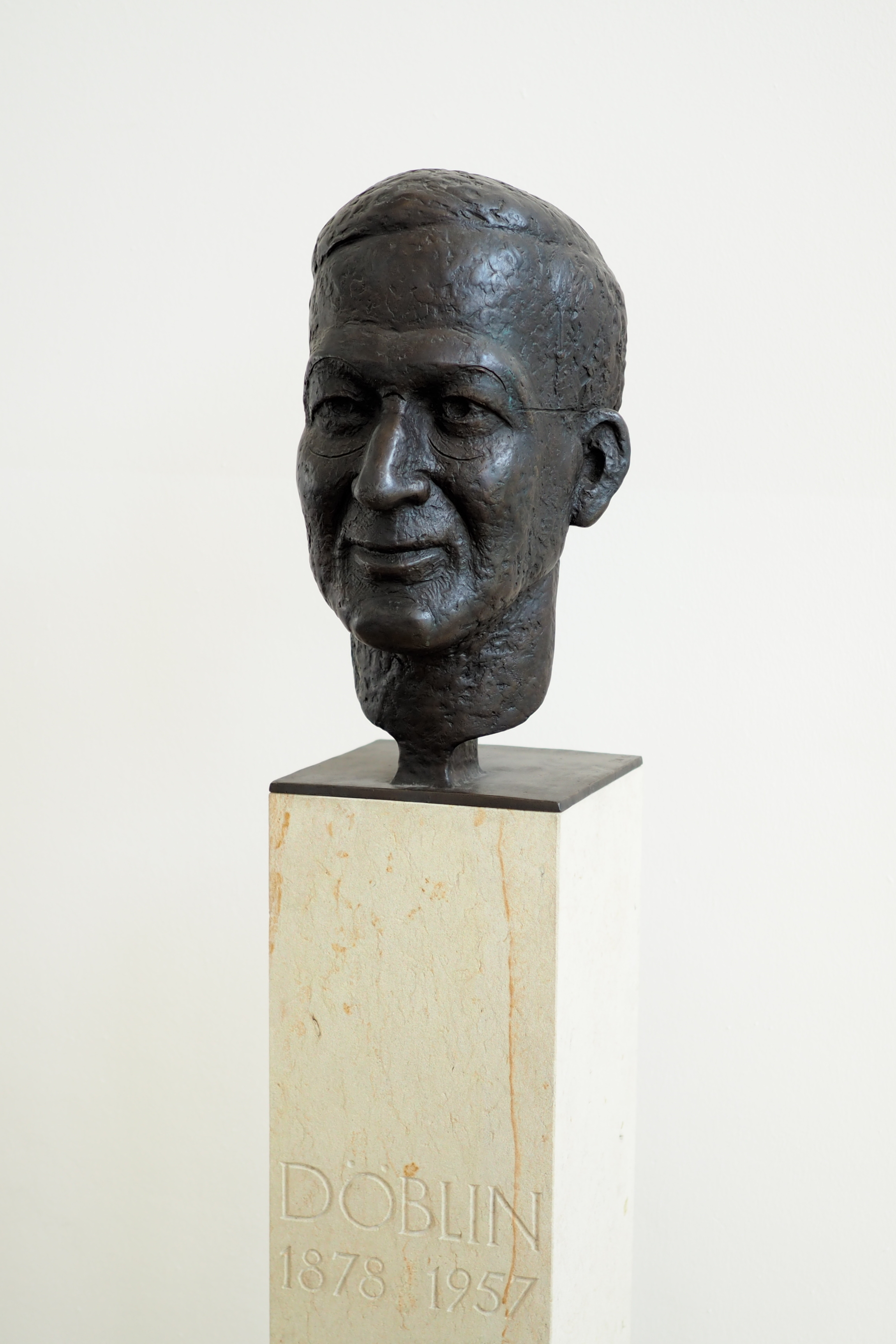
Alfred Döblin bronze bust, by Siegfried Wehrmeister

Bruno Alfred Döblin was born on 10 August 1878 at the house at Bollwerk 37 in Stettin (Szczecin), a port city in what was then the Province of Pomerania. He was the fourth of five children born to Max Döblin (1846–1921), a master tailor from Posen (Poznań), and Sophie Döblin (1844–1920), née Freudenheim, the daughter of a merchant. His older brother was actor Hugo Döblin. His parents' marriage was characterized by a tension between Max's multifaceted artistic interests—to which Döblin would later attribute his and his siblings' artistic inclinations—and Sophie's cool pragmatism. The Döblins were assimilated Jews, and Alfred became aware of a broad, societal anti-Semitism early on.

His parents' marriage dissolved in July 1888, when Max Döblin eloped with Henriette Zander, a seamstress twenty years his junior, and moved to America to start a new life. The catastrophic loss of his father was a central event in Döblin's childhood and would be formative for his later life. Shortly thereafter, in October 1888, Sophie and the five children moved to Berlin and took up residence in a small shabby apartment on the Blumenstraße in Berlin's working-class east. Döblin's parents briefly reconciled in 1889, when Max returned penniless from America; the family moved to Hamburg in April 1889, but when it came to light that Max had brought his lover back with him and was leading a double life, Sophie and the children returned to Berlin in September 1889.

The sense of being déclassé, along with rocky experiences at school, made this a difficult time for Döblin. Although he had early been a good student, starting in his fourth year of Gymnasium his performance tended toward the mediocre. Furthermore, his oppositional tendencies against the stern conventionality of the patriarchal, militaristic Wilhelminian educational system, which stood in contrast to his artistic inclinations and his free thought, earned him the status of a rebel among his teachers. Despite his hatred for school, Döblin early became a passionate writer and reader, counting Spinoza, Schopenhauer, and Nietzsche, as well as Heinrich von Kleist, Friedrich Hölderlin, and Fyodor Dostoyevsky among his most important early influences. He wrote his first novel, Jagende Rosse (Rushing Steeds), before completing school and dedicated it to the "Manes of Hölderlin". He sent a copy to the prominent critic and philosopher Fritz Mauthner who returned it a few days later. However, wishing to hide his artistic inclinations from his mother, Döblin had sent the manuscript under a false name, and was not able to retrieve it at the post office; he thus had to rewrite it entirely.

=== 1900–1914: University years and early career ===
After receiving his Abitur in 1900, Döblin enrolled at Friedrich Wilhelm University (now Humboldt University of Berlin) and began studying general medicine. In May 1904 he moved to Freiburg im Breisgau to continue his studies, concentrating on neurology and psychiatry. He began his dissertation ("Disturbances of memory in Korsakoff's Psychosis") in the winter semester of 1904–1905 at the Freiburg psychiatric clinic. His dissertation, completed in April 1905, was published that year by Berlin's Klett Verlag. He applied for assistantships in Berlin and in Stettin, where he was apparently turned down on account of his Jewish origins, before taking a short-lived position as assistant doctor at a regional asylum in Regensburg. On 15 October 1906 he took up a position at the Berlin psychiatric clinic in Buch where he worked as an assistant doctor for nearly two years. He then transferred to the city hospital "Am Urban", where he dedicated himself to internal medicine with a renewed interest. He opened his first private practice in October 1911 at Blücherstraße 18 in Berlin's Kreuzberg neighborhood, before moving the practice to Frankfurter Allee 184 in Berlin's working-class east.

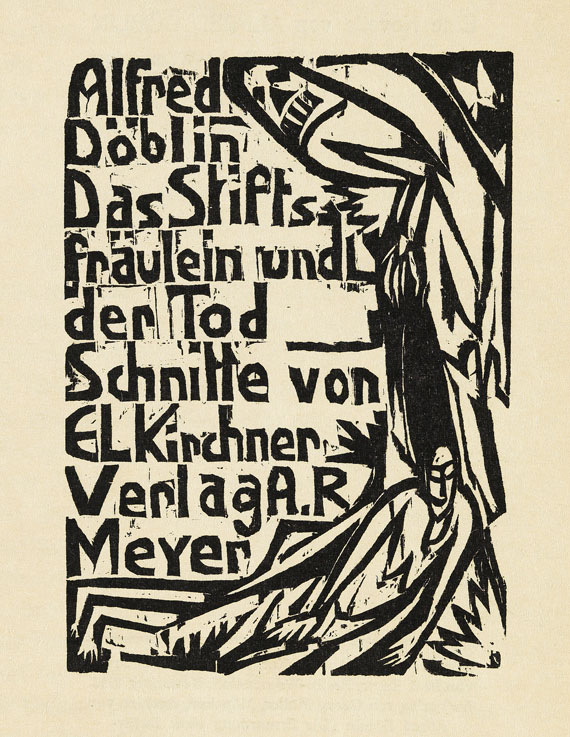
Illustrated title page of Döblin's novella "Das Stiftsfräulein und der Tod"; woodcut by Ernst Ludwig Kirchner

While working in Buch he met Friede Kunke, a 16-year-old nurse from a Protestant background with whom he became romantically involved. In the spring of 1909 he began seeing the 21-year-old Erna Reiss, a medical student and daughter of a wealthy Jewish factory owner. Despite his continued involvement with Kunke, at the urging of his family he was reluctantly engaged to Reiss on 13 February 1911 and married her on 23 January 1912; his older brother Hugo and Herwarth Walden served as best men. During the early part of his engagement to Reiss, he had been unaware that Kunke was pregnant: their son Bodo was born on 14 October 1911 and was raised by his grandmother, Elise Kunke, in Schleswig-Holstein following Friede's death from tuberculosis in 1918. Until the end of his life, Döblin maintained loose contact with Bodo, and his treatment of Friede became a lasting source of guilt. Döblin's first son with Erna Reiss, Peter Döblin, was born on 27 October 1912, and was baptized a Protestant. Peter later attended Schule am Meer, where he was registered as such.

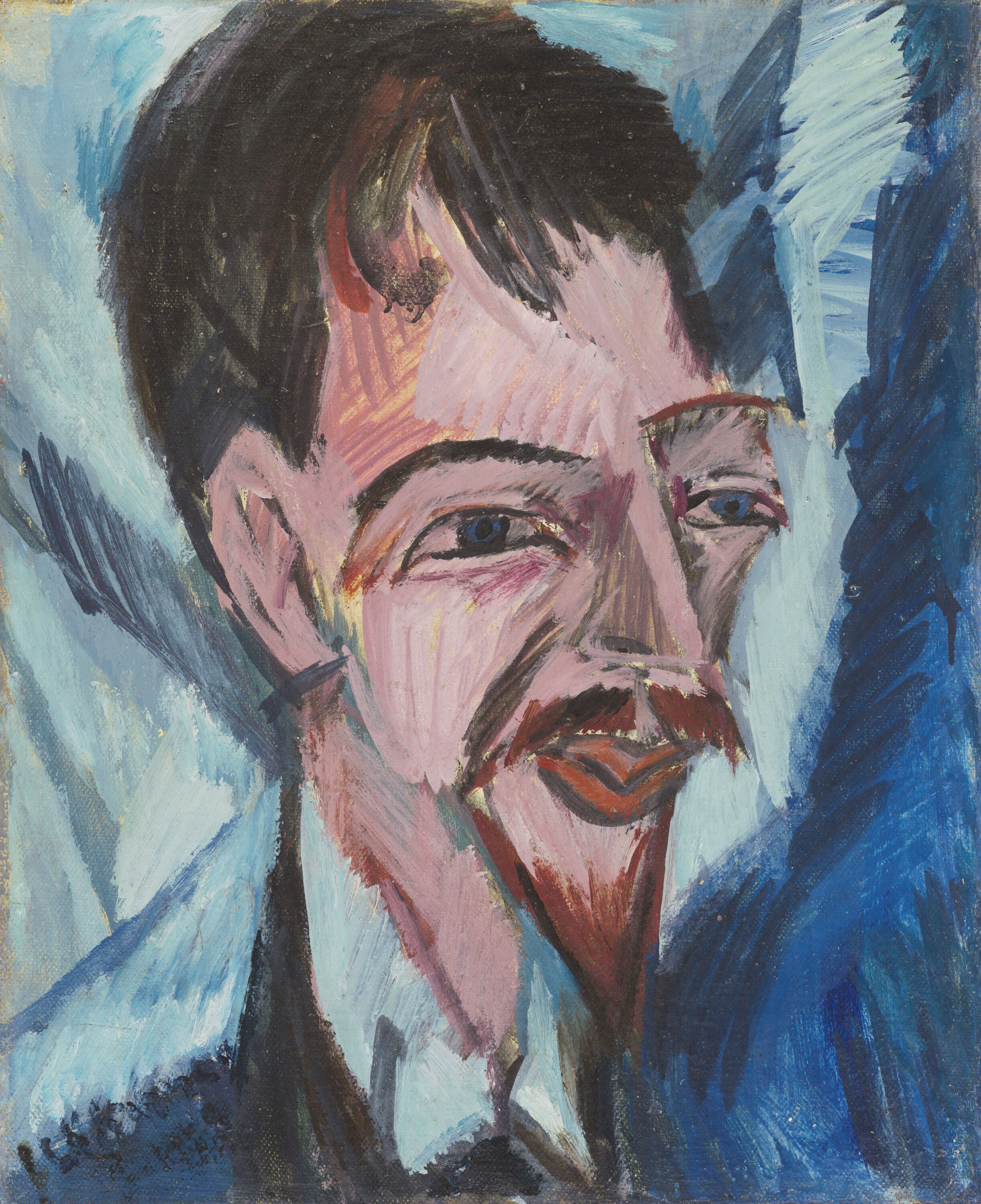
Ernst Ludwig Kirchner's portrait of Alfred Döblin

During his studies in Berlin, Döblin had written his second novel, Der Schwarze Vorhang (The Black Curtain). The novel portrays the developing sexuality of its protagonist, Johannes, and explores the themes of love, hate, and sadism; in its use of literary montage, The Black Curtain already presages the radical techniques that Döblin would later pioneer in Berlin Alexanderplatz. Introduced by a mutual acquaintance, Döblin met Georg Lewin, a music student better known as Herwarth Walden, who founded the Expressionist journal Der Sturm in 1910. Der Sturm, modeled after Karl Kraus's newspaper Die Fackel (The Torch), would soon count Döblin among its most involved contributors, and provided him with a venue for the publication of numerous literary and essayistic contributions. Through Walden Döblin made the acquaintance of poet Else Lasker-Schüler. At regular meetings at the Café des Westens on Kurfürstendamm or at the wine bar Dalbelli, Döblin got to know the circle of artists and intellectuals that would become central to the Expressionist movement in Berlin, including Peter Hille, Richard Dehmel, Erich Mühsam, Paul Scheerbart, and Frank Wedekind, among others. In October 1911 he met the painter Ernst Ludwig Kirchner, who painted several portraits of Döblin between 1912 and 1914 and illustrated some of Döblin's literary works. Döblin's early novel Der Schwarze Vorhang was published in Der Sturm, and in November 1912 the Munich publishing house Georg Müller published his collection of novellas under the title Die Ermordung einer Butterblume und andere Erzählungen. In May 1913, he completed his third novel The Three Leaps of Wang Lun (Die drei Sprünge des Wang-lun). Published in 1916, this historical novel about political uprising in 18th-century China was a literary breakthrough for Döblin, earning him literary acclaim, public recognition, and the prestigious Fontane Prize. He began writing Wadzeks Kampf mit der Dampfturbine (Wadzek's Struggle with the Steam Turbine) the following year, completing it by December 1914 although it was not published until 1918.

=== 1915–1933: The First World War and the Weimar years ===
To avoid conscription, Döblin volunteered in December 1914 and was posted to Saargemünd (Sarreguemines) as a doctor. Despite sharing in the widespread early enthusiasm for the war among German intellectuals, he soon developed a pacifist disposition. His son Wolfgang was born on 17 March 1915, followed by the births of Klaus on 20 May 1917 and Stefan on 7 December 1926. In Saargemünd the family lived in a small apartment at Neunkircherstraße 19; due to their financial situation they had to give up their Berlin apartment at the end of February 1915.

Cover of the first edition of Die drei Sprünge des Wang-lun

At the end of August, 1916, Döblin was awarded the Fontane Prize (including a monetary award of 600 Marks) for The Three Leaps of Wang Lun (Die drei Sprünge des Wang-lun). Following this recognition, Döblin set himself to work on his historical novel Wallenstein, set during the Thirty Years' War. Döblin had to interrupt work on the novel in March 1917 because he had caught typhus, but was able to use the university library at Heidelberg during his convalescence in April and May to continue researching the Thirty Years' War. Back in Saargemünd he came into conflict with his superiors due to the poor treatment of the patients; on 2 August 1917 he was transferred to Hagenau (Haguenau) in Alsace, where the library of nearby Strassbourg helped complete Wallenstein by the beginning of 1919.

At the beginning of 1919, Döblin moved into his new apartment and medical practice at Frankfurter Allee 340 in Berlin. The immediate postwar period was a turbulent time for him—his financial situation was dire, and the death of his sister Meta on 12 March 1919 as the result of an injury sustained during skirmishes between the Spartacists and nationalist troops in Berlin showed how volatile the situation in Germany was in the aftermath of the November Revolution. The years during and immediately after the war also marked Döblin's growing politicization; although he never joined a party he identified with the political left. During this time Döblin wrote a number of satirical and polemical political essays under the pseudonym "Linke Poot", a dialectical variation of "Linke Pfote" (Left Paw), eleven of which were published in 1921 in a volume called Der deutsche Maskenball (The German Masked Ball).

In February 1921, he met the 21-year-old photographer Charlotte ("Yolla") Niclas; the close romantic relationship between the two was to last many years, despite their age difference. The same year, following a family vacation to the Baltic coast, he began preparatory work on his science fiction novel Berge Meere und Giganten (Mountains Seas and Giants), which would be published in 1924. In 1920 Döblin joined the Association of German Writers (Schutzverband Deutscher Schriftsteller), and in 1924 he became its president. In November 1921 he began reviewing plays for the Prager Tagblatt, and in 1925 joined the Gruppe 1925, a discussion circle of progressive and communist intellectuals including Bertolt Brecht, Johannes R. Becher, Ernst Bloch, Hermann Kasack, Rudolf Leonhard, Walter Mehring, Robert Musil, Joseph Roth, Ernst Toller, Kurt Tucholsky, and Ernst Weiß, among others. It was likely Brecht, who counted Döblin among his significant influences, who introduced him to Erwin Piscator in 1928.

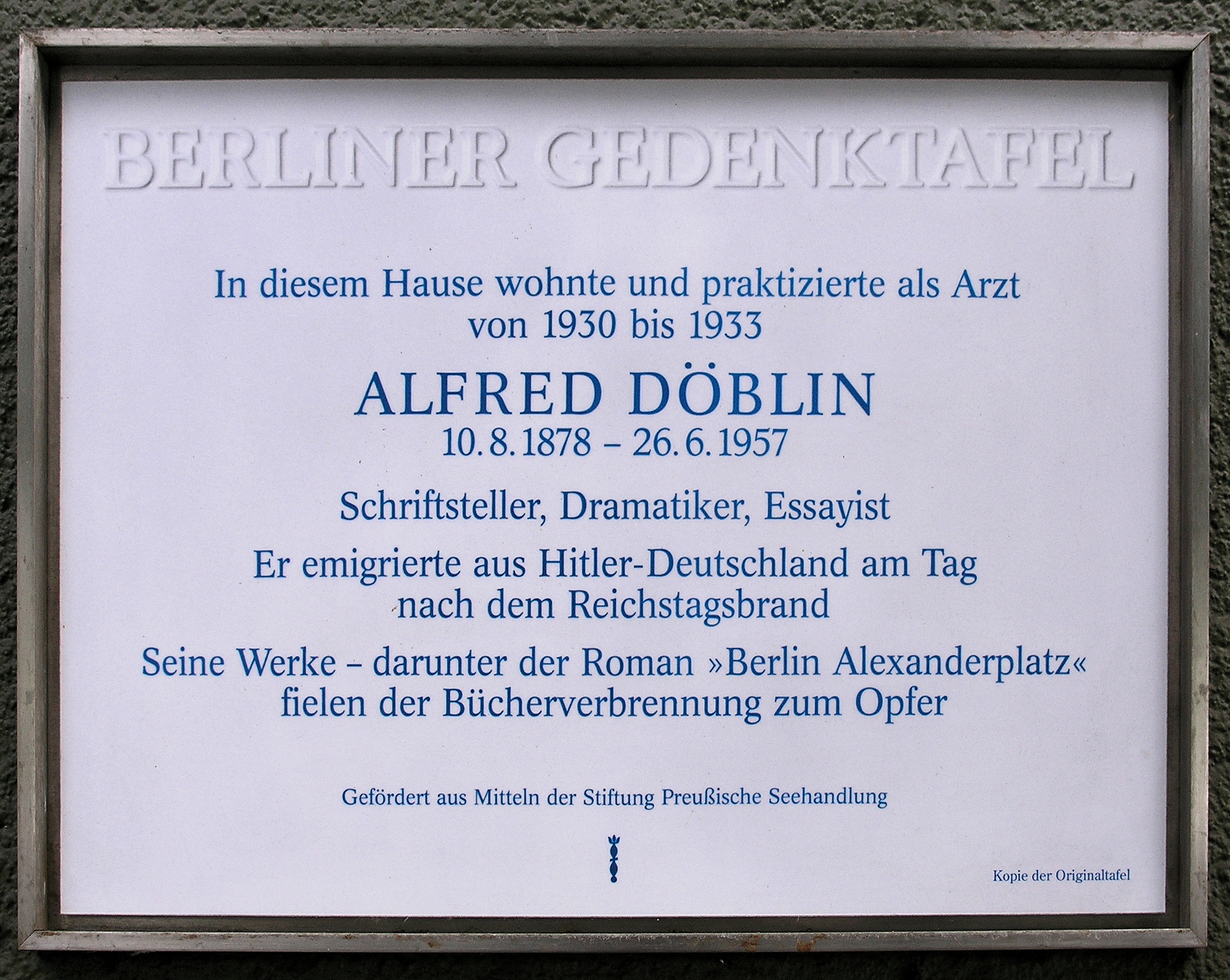
Commemorative plaque on Döblin's Berlin residence

At the end of September 1924, he set out on a two-month trip through Poland, subsidized by the Fischer Verlag and prompted in part by the anti-Semitic pogroms in Berlin's Scheunenviertel of 1923, an event that awakened Döblin's interest in Judaism. His description of his travels to Warsaw, Vilnius, Lviv, and Kraków, among other cities, was published in November 1925 under the title Reise in Polen (Journey to Poland). From 1926 to 1927 Döblin worked on his free verse epic Manas, about a figure from Indian mythology, which was published in May 1927. Manas, like his philosophical tract Das Ich über der Natur published the same year, proved to be a failure with the public. Thus despite his continued rise to prominence within the intellectual world of the Weimar Republic—in 1928, for example, he was elected to the prestigious Prussian Academy of Arts with the persistent support of Thomas Mann—literary and economic success continued to elude Döblin.

This changed with the October 1929 publication of his novel Berlin Alexanderplatz which earned him national and global fame. One of the best known appraisals of the novel is Walter Benjamin's essay, "Die Krisis des Romans" ("The Crisis of the Novel") which sees in Berlin Alexanderplatz's radical use of montage a solution to the impasses of the traditional novel. Döblin soon began transforming Berlin Alexanderplatz into a radio play and agreed to cowrite the screenplay for the film version that premiered on 8 October 1931. The early 1930s marked the high point of Döblin's fame. During this time he busied himself with lectures, readings, and the effort to contribute to a collective intellectual response to the growing power of the National Socialists. Just over a month after Hitler's ascension to power, Döblin left Germany, crossing into Switzerland on 2 March 1933.

=== 1933–1957: Exile and later life ===
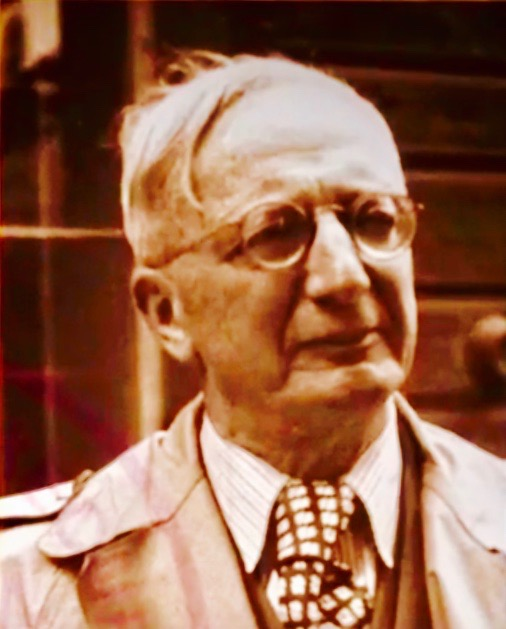
Alfred Döblin, ca. 1946

On May 10 there will be the auto-da-fé, I believe the Jew with my name will also be present, fortunately only in paper form. In this way they honor me. ... how will it be later on, in 1 year, 2 years, when will the publishing houses also be "coordinated"? Abroad, I can't be a doctor anymore, and why write, for whom? I cannot think about this fatal chapter.

— Alfred Döblin, letter of 28 April 1933 to Ferdinand Lion, on the imminent Nazi book burnings

After a brief stay in Zürich, the family moved to Paris. Döblin's closest acquaintances during this time were Claire and Yvan Goll, Hermann Kesten, Arthur Koestler, Joseph Roth, Hans Sahl, and Manès Sperber. Here he also saw Robert Musil, with whom he had kept up a sporadic relationship for over a decade, for the last time. Döblin finished his novel Babylonische Wandrung at the end of 1933. In 1935, he began work on his Amazon Trilogy, which narrates the colonization and Christianization of South America and was published in 1937–1938. During this time he also began work on his four-part novel project November 1918 about the revolution in Germany at the end of the First World War. He acquired French nationality in October 1936. In May 1939, he briefly visited the United States to take part in a PEN congress in New York. With other writers, he met with President Franklin D. Roosevelt at the White House, and saw his old Berlin acquaintance Ernst Toller again, who was suffering from severe depression and killed himself shortly thereafter.

After the start of the Second World War the family fled Paris, while Döblin's manuscripts were stored in the basement of the Sorbonne. Between the start of the war in 1939 and the German occupation of France in 1940, Döblin worked for the French ministry of information, writing counter-propaganda texts against Nazi Germany with a group of French Germanists and journalists, as well as artists like Frans Masereel.

In 1940, aged 62, Döblin was again uprooted by the German invasion of France, and spent weeks in a refugee camp in Mende. During this time, he began attending mass at the cathedral in Mende, taking a turn towards Christianity that would culminate in his religious conversion the following year. On 3 September 1940, Alfred, Erna, and Stefan boarded the Nea Hellas in Lisbon, reaching New York six days later; in October they moved to Los Angeles. Döblin worked briefly for Metro Goldwyn Mayer writing screenplays for $100 a week, but his contract expired in October 1941 and was not renewed, despite the interventions of Thomas Mann and others. Alfred, Erna, and Stefan were baptized as Roman Catholics in Hollywood's Blessed Sacrament Church on 30 November 1941.

Döblin completed work on November 1918 in the spring of 1943, but was unable to find a publisher. The only work of his that was published in German during his American exile was a private printing of 250 copies of the Nocturno episode from November 1918. Döblin was embittered by his isolation and setbacks in exile, drawing a strong distinction between his own situation and that of more successful writers less oppressed by material concerns, such as Lion Feuchtwanger and Thomas Mann. In honor of his 65th birthday, Helene Weigel organized a party on 14 August 1943 in Santa Monica. In attendance were Thomas Mann, Franz Werfel, Lion Feuchtwanger, and Bertolt Brecht, among others. Heinrich Mann gave a speech, Fritz Kortner, Peter Lorre, and Alexander Granach read aloud from Döblin's works, and he was presented with notes of congratulation and praise from Brecht, Max Horkheimer, and Alfred Polgar, among others. Compositions by Hanns Eisler were performed, and Blandine Ebinger sang Berlin chansons. Yet the festivities were dampened when Döblin gave a speech in which he mentioned his conversion to Catholicism; the religious, moral tone proved alienating, and fell on unsympathetic ears.

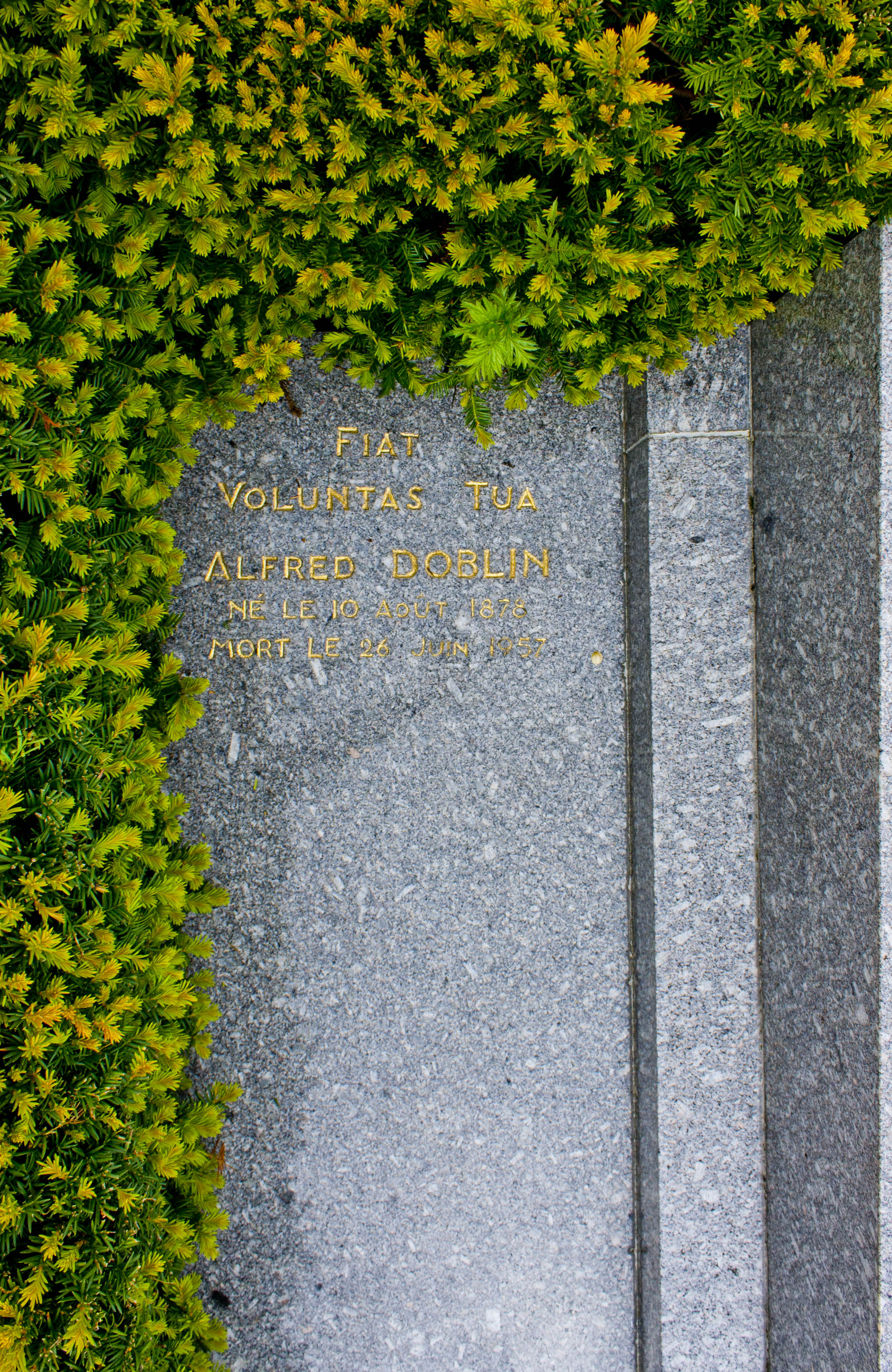
Döblin's gravestone in Housseras, France

In 1945, Döblin's 18-year-old son Stefan was called up for military service in the French army. That spring had brought the good news that Klaus was alive and in Switzerland after a period working for the French resistance, and the grim tidings that Wolfgang was dead, having committed suicide five years to avoid being captured by troops of the Wehrmacht. In October 1945, Alfred and Erna arrived in New York, sailing aboard the Argentine back to Europe. They first settled in Baden-Baden, where Döblin worked for the French military government as official representative for the office of public education; he was tasked with approving manuscripts for publication, and vehemently opposed the approval of any texts by authors who had sympathized with National Socialism, such as Ernst Jünger or Gottfried Benn. In postwar Germany's conservative cultural climate, Döblin was unable to draw on his earlier success as an author, yet continued his literary engagement with a series of publications and journals that aimed to rebuild Germany's intellectual and cultural life, reintroducing the literature banned by the Nazis and fostering the growth of younger writers. Despite these efforts, Döblin was disappointed by the apparent continuity between the Nazi years and the postwar climate. His growing pessimism was fueled by his sense of isolation and marginalization within the postwar German literary scene. In 1953, Alfred and Erna returned to Paris despite the invitation by Brecht and Johannes R. Becher to settle in East Berlin.

His last novel, Hamlet oder Die lange Nacht nimmt ein Ende (Tales of a Long Night), was published in 1956, and was favorably received. Döblin's remaining years were marked by poor health (he had Parkinson's disease) and lengthy stays in multiple clinics and hospitals, including his alma mater, Freiburg University. Through the intervention of Theodor Heuss and Joachim Tiburtius, he was able to receive more money from the Berlin office in charge of compensating victims of Nazi persecution; this, and a literary prize from the Mainz Academy in the sum of 10,000 DM helped finance his growing medical expenses.

Alfred Döblin died in the hospital in Emmendingen on 26 June 1957 and was buried two days later in the village cemetery at Housseras next to his son Wolfgang. Erna soon joined them in the same cemetery when after turning on the gas tap in the family apartment in Paris on 15 September, she forgot to light the flame.

== Major works ==
=== The Three Leaps of Wang Lun ===
Die drei Sprünge des Wang-lun (The Three Leaps of Wang Lun) was Döblin's third novel (although it was the first to be published as a book), and garnered him the Fontane Prize. Published in 1916, (although back-dated to 1915), this epic historical novel narrates upheaval and revolution in 18th-century China, and was favorably received by critics, who praised its detailed and exotic depictions of China. Wang Lun also had an influence on younger German writers, including Lion Feuchtwanger, Anna Seghers, and Bertolt Brecht; for the latter, Wang Lun provided an impulse for the development of the theory of epic theatre. In commercial sales, it is Döblin's most successful novel after Berlin Alexanderplatz.

=== Wadzeks Kampf mit der Dampfturbine ===
Cover of the first edition of Wadzeks Kampf mit der Dampfturbine

Döblin's 1918 comic novel has been seen, in its experimental narrative technique, its refusal to psychologize its characters, and its depictions of Berlin as modern metropolis, as a precursor to Döblin's better-known Berlin Alexanderplatz. Wadzeks Kampf mit der Dampfturbine (Wadzek's Battle with the Steam Turbine) tells the story of Wadzek, a factory owner locked in a losing battle with a more powerful competitor. His futile and increasingly delusional countermeasures culminate in the fortification and quixotic defense of his family's garden house in suburban Reinickendorf. Following the dissipation of this endeavor, he suffers a breakdown and finally flees the country, eloping aboard a steamship bound for America that is powered by the steam turbines of his victorious competitor. Döblin wrote the novel in the fall of 1914, submitting it to extensive stylistic revisions while serving as a doctor on the Western front; it was published in May 1918 by the Fischer Verlag. In its stringent refusal of a tragic tone, the book earned the praise of a young Bertolt Brecht.

=== Wallenstein ===
Although Döblin's 1920 epic about the Thirty Years' War was in general favorably received by critics, he was disappointed with the reception because he felt he had created in Wallenstein a peerless work; as a consequence, he wrote a scathing critique of critics which he published in 1921 under the title Der Epiker, sein Stoff und die Kritik (The Epic Poet, his Material, and Critique). The novel centers on the tension between Ferdinand II, Holy Roman Emperor and his general, Albrecht von Wallenstein; Wallenstein represents a new type of warfare characterized by ruthless Realpolitik and capitalist expansion while Ferdinand becomes increasingly overwhelmed by the course of events and gradually retreats from politics altogether. Döblin's approach to narrating the war differed from prevailing historiography in that, rather than interpreting the Thirty Years' War primarily as a religious conflict, he portrays it critically as the absurd consequence of a combination of national-political, financial, and individual psychological factors. Döblin saw a strong similarity between the Thirty Years' War and the First World War, during which he wrote Wallenstein. The novel is counted among the most innovative and significant historical novels in the German literary tradition.

=== Berge Meere und Giganten ===
Döblin's 1924 science fiction novel recounts the course of human history from the 20th to the 27th century, portraying it as a catastrophic global struggle between technological mania, natural forces, and competing political visions. Berge Meere und Giganten (Mountains Seas and Giants) presciently invokes such topics as urbanization, the alienation from nature, ecological devastation, mechanization, the dehumanization of the modern world, as well as mass migration, globalization, totalitarianism, fanaticism, terrorism, state surveillance, genetic engineering, synthetic food, the breeding of humans, biochemical warfare, and others. Stylistically and structurally experimental, it was regarded as a difficult work when it first came out and has often polarized critics. Among others, Günter Grass has praised the novel's continued relevance and insight. On June 15, 2021, Galileo Publishing released the first English translation of the novel, by Chris Godwin, under the title Mountains Oceans Giants: An Epic of the 27th Century.

=== Manas ===
This remarkable but almost totally neglected epic in free verse immediately preceded Döblin's best-known work Berlin Alexanderplatz. That both works were closely associated in Döblin's mind is shown by a remark in his Afterword to the 1955 East German edition of his big-city masterpiece: it was Manas with a Berlin accent, Praised on its publication by Robert Musil among others (I assert with confidence that this work should have the greatest influence!) it has attracted strangely little attention from Döblin scholars. Manas Part 1 tells the story of a war-hero suddenly struck with an existential realisation of Death. He demands to be taken to Shiva's Field of the Dead in the high Himalaya to commune with Souls on their way to dissolution. Having imbibed several dreadful life stories he falls unconscious, and his body is invaded by three demons who plan to use it to go down to the human world. Manas' guardian, Puto, attempting to drive out the demons, inadvertently kills the body, and Manas's soul wafts back onto the Field. Puto conveys the body back to Udaipur, then returns to the mountains to fight the demons. In Part 2, Savitri, Manas' wife, refuses to believe her husband is dead, and makes her arduous way up into the mountains to find him. Shiva becomes aware of her presence on his Field, and makes contact across their different dimensions. Savitri is able to couple with Manas' soul, and he is reborn into his body. Savitri, revealed now as the Universal Female, rejoins Shiva on Mount Kailash. In Part 3, the reborn Manas rejoices in his physicality, but does not understand where he fits into the world. He comes upon Puto fighting the three demons, captures them, and is carried by them back down into the world. A village priest declares that Manas and the demons make up a single new terrible being: likely meaning a human no longer innocent but equipped with Id, Ego and Superego. When Manas destroys a temple, Shiva comes down to subdue him, but Manas' Ego calls out to the natural world, and Shiva has to release him, transforming the demons into sleek winged panthers on which Manas rides to connect Souls longing to return with humans tired of life. This powerful and sometimes puzzling story is told in a vigorous, direct and dramatic language, with constantly shifting moods and voices. In order to make it more accessible to English readers in the absence of any guidance from reviewers, the translator C D Godwin has adapted it as a Play for Voices, available for download at the website Beyond Alexanderplatz: Alfred Döblin's OTHER writings, in English.

=== Berlin Alexanderplatz ===
Generally considered Döblin's masterpiece, Berlin Alexanderplatz has become an iconic text of the Weimar Republic. Published in 1929, its innovative use of literary montage as well as its panoramic portrayal of a modern metropolis have earned it a place among the key works of literary modernism. Berlin Alexanderplatz tells the story of Franz Biberkopf, who as the novel opens has just been released from prison for killing his lover. Although he seeks to become respectable, he is quickly drawn into a struggle "with something that comes from without, that is unpredictable and looks like a destiny." Biberkopf suffers a series of setbacks and catastrophes, including the murder of his lover and the loss of an arm. The novel earned Döblin global recognition and literary celebrity, and was translated into English in 1931 by Eugene Jolas, a friend of James Joyce. It has been filmed twice, once in the 1931 Berlin-Alexanderplatz, directed by Phil Jutzi and starring Heinrich George as Biberkopf, and then again in Rainer Werner Fassbinder's 1980 14-part television film. In a 2002 poll of 100 noted writers from around the world, Berlin Alexanderplatz was named among the top 100 books of all time.

=== November 1918: A German Revolution ===
November 1918: A German Revolution (November 1918, eine deutsche Revolution) is a novel tetralogy about the German Revolution of 1918–1919. The four volumes—Vol. I: Bürger und Soldaten (Citizens and Soldiers), Vol. II Verratenes Volk (A People Betrayed), Vol. III, Heimkehr der Fronttruppen (Return of the Frontline Troops), and Vol. IV, Karl und Rosa (Karl and Rosa)—together comprise the most significant work from Döblin's period of exile (1933–1945). The work was highly praised by figures such as Bertolt Brecht, and critic Gabriele Sander has described November 1918 as representing the culmination of Döblin's work in the genre of the historical novel.

=== Tales of a Long Night ===
Hamlet oder Die lange Nacht nimmt ein Ende (Tales of a Long Night) (1956) was Döblin's last novel. Set in England immediately after the Second World War, the novel narrates the story of Edward Allison, an English soldier who had been badly wounded during the war. Back among his family, Edward must deal with his war trauma, long buried family conflicts, and his destabilized sense of self. The novel treats such themes as the search for the self, guilt and responsibility, the struggle between the sexes, war and violence, and religion, among others. Döblin wrote the novel between August 1945 and October 1946, although it was not published until a decade later. Upon its 1956 release by the East Berlin publishing house Rütten & Loening, the novel was well received. The reference to Hamlet in the German title was likely motivated by Döblin's reading of Sigmund Freud's interpretation of Shakespeare's Hamlet.

== Legacy ==
Döblin is generally considered one of the most important German writers of the twentieth century; yet popular perception of his work rests almost exclusively on Berlin Alexanderplatz, considered the canonical German novel of the modern metropolis ("Großstadtroman"). His writing is characterized by an innovative use of montage and perspectival play, as well as what he dubbed in 1913 a "fantasy of fact" ("Tatsachenphantasie")—an interdisciplinary poetics that draws on modern discourses ranging from the psychiatric to the anthropological to the theological, in order to "register and articulate sensory experience and to open up his prose to new areas of knowledge." His engagement with such key movements of the European avant-garde as futurism, expressionism, dadaism, and Neue Sachlichkeit has led critic Sabina Becker to call him "perhaps the most significant representative of literary modernism in Berlin."

In a 1967 essay, Günter Grass declared: "Without the Futurist elements of Döblin's work from Wang Lun to Berlin Alexanderplatz, my prose is inconceivable." Döblin was also an influence on writers such as W.G. Sebald and Bertolt Brecht; as Brecht wrote in 1943, "I learned more about the essence of the epic from Döblin than from anyone else. His epic writing and even his theory about the epic strongly influenced my own dramatic art."

Modern, well-edited, critical volumes of almost the complete œuvre have been appearing in German since the 1980s, published by Deutscher Taschenbuch Verlag and, since 2008, by the Fischer Verlag; and the Internationale Alfred-Döblin Kolloquien have been held every two years since the early 1980s. Döblin's papers and manuscripts are housed at the German Literature Archive in Marbach am Neckar.

== See also ==
- Exilliteratur
- Expressionism
- Modernist literature
