= Berlin Alexanderplatz =

1929 novel by Alfred Döblin

- Reproduction of the 1st edition cover
- Author: Alfred Döblin
- Cover artist: George Salter
- Language: German
- Genre: Novel
- Publisher: S. Fischer Verlag, Berlin
- Publication date: 1929
- Publication place: Germany
- English publication date: 1931

Berlin Alexanderplatz (German: [bɛʁˈliːn ʔalɛkˈsandɐˌplats]) is a 1929 novel by Alfred Döblin. It is considered one of the most important and innovative works of the Weimar Republic. In a 2002 poll of 100 noted writers, the book was named among the top 100 books of all time.

== Summary ==
The story concerns a murderer, Franz Biberkopf, fresh from prison. When his friend murders the prostitute on whom Biberkopf has been relying as an anchor, he realizes that he will be unable to extricate himself from the underworld into which he has sunk. He must deal with misery, lack of opportunities, crime and the imminent ascendancy of Nazism. During his struggle to survive against all odds, life rewards him with an unsuspected surprise, but his happiness does not last as the story continues.

== Focus and narrative technique ==
The novel is set in the working-class district near Alexanderplatz in 1920s Berlin. Although its narrative style is sometimes compared to that of James Joyce, critics such as Walter Benjamin have drawn a distinction between Ulysses’ interior monologue and Berlin Alexanderplatz's use of montage. Oliver Kamm, writing in the London Times, says Döblin's methods are more akin to Kafka in his use of "erlebte Rede (roughly, experienced speech — a blending of first-person and third-person narrative)". The novel is told from multiple points of view, and uses sound effects, newspaper articles, songs, speeches, and other books to propel the plot.

== Translations ==
The novel was translated into English in 1931 by Eugene Jolas, a friend of James Joyce. The translation was not well received; it particularly was criticised for the way in which it rendered everyday working-class speech. A 2018 English translation by Michael Hofmann, published by New York Review Books, was given a starred review from Kirkus Reviews, which called it "vigorous and fresh" and a "welcome refurbishing of a masterpiece of literary modernism". According to Oliver Kamm, "Dialogue is the most difficult thing to get right in translation" which Hofmann has rendered "in cockney dialect. It reads fluently, even at the risk of being possibly obscure to a non-British audience".

== Film adaptations ==
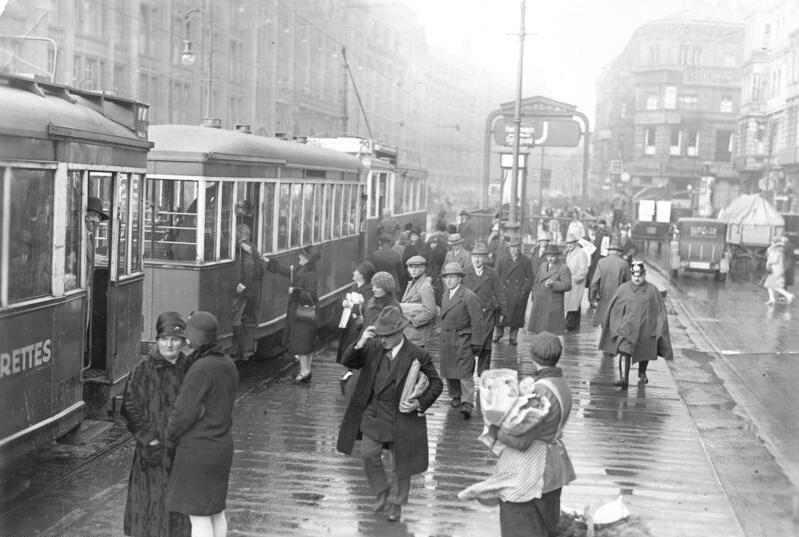
Alexanderplatz in 1928

The novel has been adapted three times for film. In 1931 Berlin-Alexanderplatz was directed by Piel Jutzi. Döblin worked on the adaptation, along with Karlheinz Martin and Hans Wilhelm. The film starred Heinrich George, Maria Bard, Margarete Schlegel, Bernhard Minetti, Gerhard Bienert, Albert Florath and Paul Westermeier.

The second adaptation, Berlin Alexanderplatz, was directed by Rainer Werner Fassbinder. Produced for and shown on German television in 1980 as a 14-part miniseries, it also has been shown theatrically. It runs for 15 hours (NTSC and film releases expand the runtime by a half hour). Upon its release in New York City, ticket holders were required to come to the theatre for three consecutive nights to see the entire film.

Both films were released in November 2007 by the Criterion Collection in the US in a multi-disc DVD. A Region 2 edition of the Fassbinder version was released in the UK by Second Sight in October that year.

Burhan Qurbani directed the most recent film adaptation, Berlin Alexanderplatz, which premiered at the 70th Berlin International Film Festival in 2020. Qurbani's version recontextualised the lead role of Franz as Francis, an Afro-German refugee from Guinea-Bissau.

== See also ==
- List of fiction set in Berlin
- Museum of Modern Literature, where the original manuscript is held
- Best German Novels of the Twentieth Century
