= The Student of Prague =

The Student of Prague (in German, Der Student von Prag) may refer to:

- The Student of Prague (1913 film), a German silent film by Stellan Rye
- The Student of Prague (1926 film), a remake of the original film by Henrik Galeen
- The Student of Prague (1935 film), a German film directed by Arthur Robison and starring Anton Walbrook
- The Student of Prague (painting), a 1983 painting by Julian Schnabel
