= The Great Unknown (1927 film) =

1927 film

- Directed by: Manfred Noa
- Written by: Edgar Wallace (novel); Herbert Juttke; Georg C. Klaren
- Starring: Jack Trevor; Arthur Kraußneck; Andrée Lafayette
- Cinematography: Franz Planer
- Music by: Hans May
- Production company: Noa-Film
- Distributed by: Bavaria Film
- Release date: 17 November 1927
- Country: Germany
- Languages: Silent; German intertitles

The Great Unknown (German:Der große Unbekannte) is a 1927 German silent crime film directed by Manfred Noa and starring Jack Trevor, Arthur Kraußneck and Andrée Lafayette. It is based on a novel by Edgar Wallace.

The film's sets were designed by the art director Karl Machus. It was shot at the Bavaria Studios in Munich.

== Cast ==
- Jack Trevor as Major Paul Roy Amery
- Arthur Kraußneck as Maurice Tarn
- Andrée Lafayette as Else Marlowe, Tarns Mündel
- Eugen Neufeld as Inspektor Wille von Scotland Yard
- Ernst Reicher as Polizeikommissar Bickerson
- Evi Eva as Jessie Damm
- Nien Soen Ling as Feng Ho
- John Loder as Dr. Ralf Hallam
- Kurt Gerron as Bankier Tupperwill
- Sig Arno as Mauropolus
- Hugo Werner-Kahle as Mr. Damm, Jessies Vater
- Ruth Weyher

== Bibliography ==
- Bergfelder, Tim. International Adventures: German Popular Cinema and European Co-Productions in the 1960s. Berghahn Books, 2005.
