= Small Town Sinners =

1927 film

- Directed by: Bruno Rahn
- Written by: Hans Alfred Kihn (play Meiseken); Herbert Juttke; Georg C. Klaren
- Starring: Asta Nielsen; Hermann Picha; Maria Paudler
- Cinematography: Guido Seeber
- Production company: Rahn-Film
- Distributed by: Pantomim-Film
- Release date: 13 September 1927
- Country: Germany
- Languages: Silent; German intertitles

Small Town Sinners (German:Kleinstadtsünder) is a 1927 German silent film directed by Bruno Rahn and starring Asta Nielsen, Hermann Picha and Maria Paudler. The film was released on 13 September 1927.

== Cast ==
- Asta Nielsen as Selma Karchow
- Hermann Picha as Meiseken
- Maria Paudler as Hedwig, Tochter Rohdes
- Hans Adalbert Schlettow as Wilhelm Bostelmann
- Henry Bender as Ein Versicherungsagent
- Hans Wassmann as August Karchow
- Ferdinand von Alten as Arthur Canisius, Assessor
- Max Maximilian as Rohde
- Julietta Brandt as Ein Wandervogel
- Bobbie Bender
- Alexandra Schmitt
- Emmy Wyda

== Bibliography ==
- Eric Rentschler. German Film & Literature. Routledge, 2013.
