= Lord of the Night =

1927 film

- Directed by: Carl Heinz Wolff
- Written by: Ernst Fiedler-Spies; Paul Rosenhayn
- Produced by: Carl Heinz Wolff
- Starring: Kurt Brenkendorf; Aud Egede-Nissen; Rudolf Klein-Rogge
- Cinematography: Paul Holzki
- Production company: Kowo-Schicht
- Distributed by: Hirschel-Sofar-Film
- Release date: 26 April 1927
- Country: Germany
- Languages: Silent; German intertitles

Lord of the Night (German: Der Herr der Nacht) is a 1927 German silent thriller film directed by Carl Heinz Wolff and starring Kurt Brenkendorf, Aud Egede-Nissen, and Rudolf Klein-Rogge.

The film's art direction was by Botho Hoefer and August Rinaldi.

== Cast ==
In alphabetical order

- Kurt Brenkendorf as Ludwig Mylius
- Aud Egede-Nissen as Magda Mylius
- Magda Elgen as Denise Lavallière
- Hugo Flink as Engl. Varieté-Direktor
- Antonie Jaeckel as Ludwig Mylius Frau
- Erich Kaiser-Titz as Rudolf Thomany
- Rudolf Klein-Rogge as Eugen Lascano
- Elizza La Porta as Die perle des wedding-palais 'trude treffe
- Theodor Loos as Dr. Lanz
- Charlotte Schmidt as Denise Lavallières Zofe
- Grete Schmidt as Privatsekretärin bei Lascano
- Hans Schüren
- Sylvia Torf as Gadrobiere
- Gustav Trautschold

== Bibliography ==
- Grange, William (2008). Cultural Chronicle of the Weimar Republic. Lanham, MD: Scarecrow Press. ISBN 978-0-8108-5967-8.
