= Incest (film) =

1929 film directed by James Bauer

- Directed by: James Bauer
- Written by: Herbert Juttke; Georg C. Klaren
- Produced by: Josef Hahn
- Starring: Walter Rilla; Erna Morena; Olga Chekhova
- Cinematography: Karl Hasselmann
- Music by: Pasquale Perris
- Production company: Ines Internationale Spielfilm
- Distributed by: Biograph-Film
- Release date: 16 October 1929
- Running time: 81 minutes
- Country: Germany
- Languages: Silent; German intertitles

Incest (German: § 173 St.G. B. Blutschande) is a 1929 German silent drama film directed by James Bauer and starring Walter Rilla, Erna Morena, and Olga Chekhova. It was shot at the Staaken Studios in Berlin. The film's sets were designed by the art director Max Heilbronner.

== Synopsis ==
Gardener Martin Hollman meets Lisbeth his much older wife Hedwig's daughter from her first marriage. She becomes his housekeeper and the two fall in love and when she falls pregnant go to get married. At the registry office they are informed that under the criminal code they are considered to have committed incest.

== Cast ==
- Walter Rilla as Martin Hollman
- Erna Morena as Hedwig Hollman seine Frau
- Olga Chekhova as Lisbeth Kröger, deren Tochter aus erster Ehe
- Olga Limburg as Margot Stein
- Grete Graal as Edith Hollman deren Tochter
- Paul Otto as Rolf van Heynen
- Paul Henckels as Amtmann
- Theodor Loos as Pastor
- Max Maximilian as Gendarm
- Ekkehard Arendt as Gärtnergehilfe
- Valy Arnheim

== Bibliography ==
- Bock, Hans-Michael; Bergfelder, Tim, eds. (2009). The Concise Cinegraph: Encyclopaedia of German Cinema. New York: Berghahn Books. ISBN 978-1-57181-655-9.
