= Witches' Night =

Witches' Night may refer to:

- Witches' Night (1927 film), German silent film
- Witches' Night (1937 film), Swedish film
