= The Hangman (1928 film) =

1928 German silent film

- Directed by: Adolf Trotz; Theodor Sparkuhl
- Written by: Emanuel Alfieri; Hans Jacoby
- Produced by: Arthur Ziehm
- Starring: Andrée Lafayette; Bernhard Goetzke; Fritz Kampers
- Cinematography: Theodor Sparkuhl; Johannes Männling
- Music by: Bernard Homola
- Production company: Hisa-Film
- Distributed by: Arthur Ziehm
- Release date: 9 August 1928
- Running time: 94 minutes
- Country: Germany
- Languages: Silent; German intertitles

The Hangman or The Prosecutor Accuses (German:Der Henker or Der Staatsanwalt klagt an) is a 1928 German silent film directed by Adolf Trotz and Theodor Sparkuhl, starring Andrée Lafayette, Bernhard Goetzke and Fritz Kampers. A public prosecutor, a merciless lawyer, is reformed by his own experiences.

== Plot summary ==
Public Prosecutor Leander is known for his strict approach to legal proceedings, frequently demanding severe punishments, including the death penalty, for defendants. After encountering a complex case firsthand, his perspective on the legal system changes as he recognizes that intense emotions can drive individuals to unexpected actions. Consequently, Leander begins to adopt a more lenient and understanding stance in his cases to prevent wrongful convictions.

After this experience, Leander takes a more lenient approach in the next case, pleading for understanding and leniency for a defendant whose jealous rage had driven him to a desperate act. In this way, Prosecutor Leander, who from now on looks at his cases from a less narrow perspective, can prevent the accused from being unjustly convicted and, moreover, reveal the true perpetrator of the murder for which the accused is in court.

== Cast ==
- Andrée Lafayette as barmaid
- Bernhard Goetzke as Prosecutor Leander
- Fritz Kampers as villain
- Max Landa as lawyer
- Georg John
- Anna von Palen
- Robert Garrison
- Antonie Jaeckel as housekeeper
- Irm Cherry
- Félix de Pomés

== Production ==
The Hangman passed the film censorship board on 6 August 1928 and premiered on 9 August 1928 at Berlin's Primus-Palast. In Austria, the film was released on 14 December 1928 under the title The Hangman. The seven-act play, which was banned for young people, was 2,363 metres long.

The film's art direction was by Victor Trivas.

== Contemporary reception ==
The Österreichische Film-Zeitung wrote: "This is a problem film, powerful and memorable. As a result, it also has a strong impact. (...) Directed with gripping vitality and very effectively played, especially by the leading actors, Bernhard Goetzke and Lafayette..."

The Kino-Journal wrote: "Both the problem itself and the portrayal are powerfully gripping. Götzke's broad conception and the poignantly powerful facial expressions create a picture of great theatrical violence."

The Illustrierte Kronen-Zeitung found several points of criticism that diminished the value of the production. It said: "A gripping, promising subject, which two directors have taken on board. (...) But instead of a double achievement, they only achieved a half-hearted one; they only describe external events; one has to imagine the mood and experience. The transformation of the prosecutor, his pangs of conscience, the actual, genuinely cinematic core of the plot, are only briefly hinted at, and otherwise appear almost comfortable and gentle. Were it not for the lead actor Bernhard Goetzke, who, without any external support, could credibly bring to life all the phases of the development of the fanatic who is led to warm humanity, the whole film would be a flop."
