= Guillotine (film) =

1924 film

- Hans Albers and Marcella Albani
- Directed by: Guido Parish
- Starring: Willy Fritsch; Marcella Albani; Hans Albers
- Cinematography: Achille Nani
- Production company: Albani-Film
- Release date: 19 September 1924
- Country: Germany
- Languages: Silent; German intertitles

Guillotine is a 1924 German silent drama film directed by Guido Parish and starring Willy Fritsch, Marcella Albani and Hans Albers.

The film's sets were designed by the art director August Rinaldi.

== Cast ==
- Willy Fritsch as Paul
- Marcella Albani as Marie und die Mutter
- Hans Albers as Gaston Brieux
- Andja Zimowa as Alice
- Leopold von Ledebur as Cartier, Bankier
- Eduard von Winterstein as Prokurist Laroche
- Georg John
- Bruno Ziener

== Bibliography ==
- Hans-Michael Bock and Tim Bergfelder. The Concise Cinegraph: An Encyclopedia of German Cinema. Berghahn Books.
