= In Werder the Trees are in Bloom =

1928 film

- Directed by: Fred Sauer
- Written by: Max Ehrlich; Herbert Juttke; Georg C. Klaren
- Starring: Teddy Bill; Fritz Schulz; Lotte Werkmeister
- Cinematography: Willy Goldberger
- Production company: Essem-Film
- Distributed by: Star-Film
- Release date: 9 August 1928
- Country: Germany
- Languages: Silent; German intertitles

In Werder the Trees are in Bloom (German: In Werder blühen die Bäume) is a 1928 German silent film directed by Fred Sauer and starring Teddy Bill, Fritz Schulz and Lotte Werkmeister.

The film's art direction was by Kurt Richter.

== Cast ==
- Teddy Bill as Karl
- Fritz Schulz as Willie
- Lotte Werkmeister as Frau Pieseke
- Evi Eva as Evi Pieseke
- Karl Elzer as Mr. Morray
- Viola Garden as Mady Morray
- Sig Arno as Herr von Blasius
- Karl Platen as Droschkenkutscher Gustav
- Sophie Pagay as Gustavs Frau
