= Witches' Night (1927 film) =

1927 film

- Directed by: James Bauer
- Written by: Eva Lindner; Armin Petersen
- Starring: Gerd Briese; Vivian Gibson; Evelyn Holt
- Cinematography: Werner Brandes; Curt Helling
- Production company: Bavaria Film
- Release date: 4 April 1927
- Country: Germany
- Languages: Silent; German intertitles

Witches' Night (German: Walpurgisnacht) is a 1927 German silent film directed by James Bauer and starring Gerd Briese, Vivian Gibson and Evelyn Holt.

The film's art direction was by Robert A. Dietrich.

== Cast ==
- Gerd Briese
- Vivian Gibson
- Evelyn Holt
- Dietrich Ulpts

== Bibliography ==
- Grange, William. Cultural Chronicle of the Weimar Republic. Scarecrow Press, 2008.
