= There Was Once a Loyal Hussar =

1929 film

- Directed by: Carl Heinz Wolff
- Starring: Grit Haid
- Release date: 1929
- Country: Germany
- Language: German

There Was Once a Loyal Hussar (German: Es war einmal ein treuer Husar) is a 1929 German film directed by Carl Heinz Wolff and starring Grit Haid. It was shot at the Halensee Studios in Berlin. It takes its title from the opening line of the traditional song "The Faithful Hussar".

== Cast ==
- Carl Auen as Prinz Achmed Effendi
- Kurt Brenkendorf as Kriminalbeamter
- Otti Dietze as Psyche
- Grit Haid as Hannerl
- Karl Harbacher as Prinz Achmed Effendi
- Melitta Klefer as Rose
- Rudolf Lettinger as Der Kronenwirt
- Olga Limburg as Kläre
- Carl Walther Meyer as Victor von Ense
- Ernst Morgan as Scheel
- Ressel Orla as Therese
- Otto Reinwald as Balduin
- Ernst Rückert as Hermann
- Hedwig von Lorée as Frau Peters
- Max Walden as Amor

== Bibliography ==
- Holmstrom, John (1996). The Moving Picture Boy: An International Encyclopaedia from 1895 to 1995. Norwich: Michael Russell. ISBN 978-0-85955-178-6.
