= Perjury (film) =

1929 film

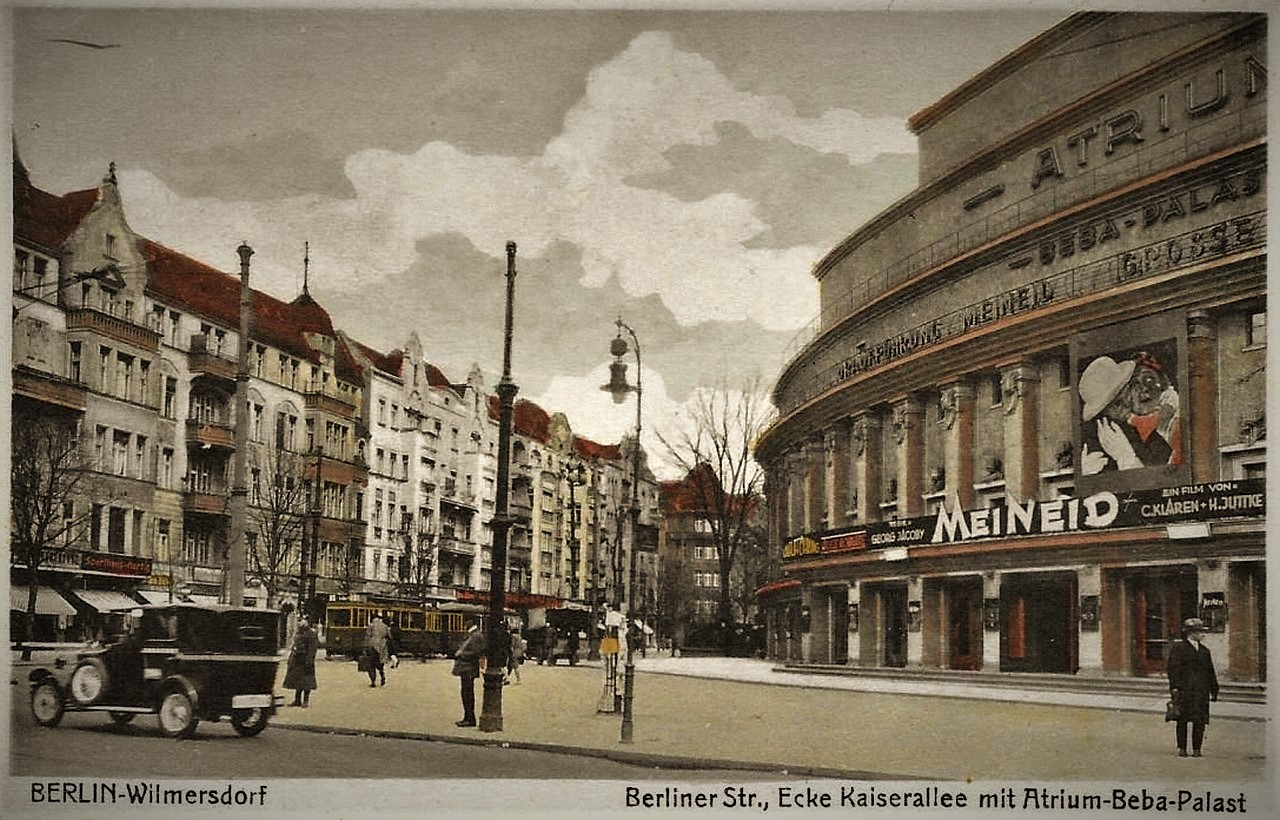
- Postcard showing the theatrical announcement of the film set on the front of the Wilmersdorf Atrium, in Berlin
- German: Meineid
- Directed by: Georg Jacoby
- Written by: Georg C. Klaren; Herbert Juttke
- Produced by: Seymour Nebenzal
- Starring: Alice Roberts; Francis Lederer; Miles Mander; Inge Landgut
- Cinematography: Willy Goldberger
- Production company: Nero Film
- Distributed by: Vereinigte Star-Film
- Release date: 26 April 1929
- Running time: 91 minutes
- Country: Germany
- Languages: Silent; German intertitles

Perjury (German: Meineid) is a 1929 German drama film directed by Georg Jacoby and starring Alice Roberts, Francis Lederer, and Miles Mander. It was shot at the Staaken Studios in Berlin. The film's sets were designed by the art director André Andrejew. The film was released at the Atrium and Primus-Palast, in Berlin, on April 26, 1929.

== Cast ==
- Alice Roberts as Inge Sperber
- Francis Lederer as Fenn
- Miles Mander as Adolf Sperber
- Inge Landgut as Elschen Sperber
- Paul Henckels as prosecutor
- La Jana as Daisy Storm
- Carl Auen as defense lawyer
- Gerd Briese as police officer
