= Call at Midnight =

1929 film directed by Mario Bonnard

- Directed by: Mario Bonnard
- Written by: Jacques Natanson (play); Claus Pretorius
- Produced by: Paul Ebner; Maxim Galitzenstein
- Starring: Marcella Albani; Ralph Arthur Roberts; Curt Bois
- Cinematography: Georg Bruckbauer; Willy Goldberger
- Production company: Maxim-Film
- Distributed by: Bavaria Film
- Release date: 1 May 1929
- Country: Germany
- Languages: Silent; German intertitles

Call at Midnight (German: Anschluß um Mitternacht) is a 1929 German silent film directed by Mario Bonnard and starring Marcella Albani, Ralph Arthur Roberts, and Curt Bois.

The film's art direction was by Heinrich Richter.

== Cast ==
- Marcella Albani as Liane
- Ralph Arthur Roberts as Michel
- Curt Bois as Emil
- Jean Bradin as Henri
- Lore Braun as Ninette
- Max Maximilian as Poker-Maxe
- Alberto Pasquali as Der gestrenge Vater

== Bibliography ==
- Goble, Alan (1999). The Complete Index to Literary Sources in Film. Berlin: Walter de Gruyter. ISBN 978-3-11-095194-3.
