= Leo Meyer (producer) =

German film producer (1873–1944)

- Born: 28 September 1891; Weener, Germany
- Died: 1 July 1942 (aged 50)
- Other name: Leo Meijer
- Occupation: Film producer
- Years active: 1926–1939

Leo Meyer (28 September 1891 – 1 July 1942) was a German film producer. He is sometimes also credited as Leo Meijer. Following the Nazi rise to power Meyer, who was Jewish, went into exile and emigrated to the Netherlands where he continued to produce films.

Amongst the films that Meyer worked on in Weimar Germany was the war film Westfront 1918.

== Selected filmography ==
- Rinaldo Rinaldini (1927)
- Circle of Lovers (1927)
- Sex in Chains (1928)
- Somnambul (1929)
- Marriage in Trouble (1929)
- Westfront 1918 (1930)
- A Thousand Words of German (1930)
- Panic in Chicago (1931)
- The First Right of the Child (1932)

== Bibliography ==
- Ashkenazi, Ofer. Weimar Film and Modern Jewish Identity. Palgrave Macmillan, 2012.
