= Why Get Married? =

1924 film

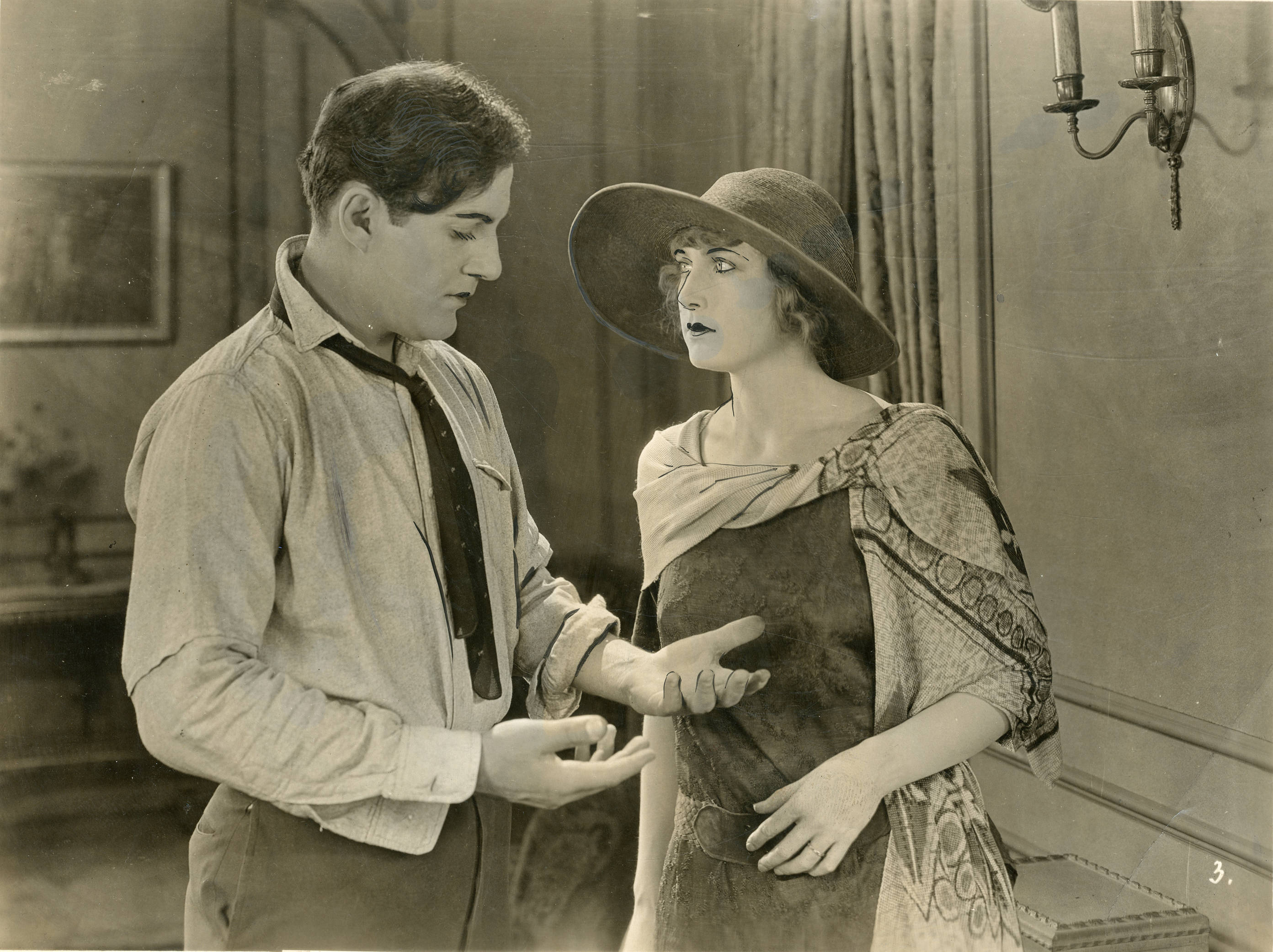
- Directed by: Paul Cazeneuve
- Written by: William M. Conselman
- Produced by: Léo-Ernest Ouimet
- Starring: Andrée Lafayette; Jack Perrin; Helen Ferguson
- Cinematography: Georges Benoît
- Production company: Laurel Productions
- Distributed by: Regal Films; Associated Exhibitors
- Release date: February 10, 1924
- Running time: 59 minutes
- Countries: Canada; United States
- Language: Silent (English intertitles)

Why Get Married? is a 1924 American-Canadian silent drama film directed by Paul Cazeneuve and starring Andrée Lafayette, Jack Perrin, and Helen Ferguson.

== Plot ==
As described in a film magazine review, Marcia Wainwright, a young married woman, works in the Robert Strong offices. Janet Carroll, another employee, leaves her job to be a housewife when she weds James Allen. Jack Wainwright, Marcia's husband, meets with misfortune and becomes a freight handler. Marcia is promoted and a breach widens between her and her husband Jack. Rodney Strong begins to pay attention to Marcia and writes her anonymous letters which injure her and the Allens by hinting at a liaison between Marcia and James Allen. Jack Wainwright makes good, discovers Rodney's plot, thrashes him, and wins back the affections of his wife. Marcia quits her position. The Allens are reconciled.

== Cast ==
- Andrée Lafayette as Marcia Wainright
- Jack Perrin as Jack Wainright
- Helen Ferguson as Janet Allen
- Bernard Randall as Rodney Strong
- Max Constant as James B. Allen
- William H. Turner as Mr. Carroll
- Orpha Alba as Mrs. Carroll
- Edwin B. Tilton as John Strong
- Buddy Smith as Boy (uncredited)

== Bibliography ==
- Connelly, Robert B. The Silents: Silent Feature Films, 1910-36, Volume 40, Issue 2. December Press, 1998.
- Munden, Kenneth White. The American Film Institute Catalog of Motion Pictures Produced in the United States, Part 1. University of California Press, 1997.
