= Herbert Juttke =

German screenwriter (1897–1952)

- Born: 24 February 1897; London, England
- Died: May 1952 (aged 55); Wiesbaden, Hesse; West Germany
- Occupation: Screenwriter
- Years active: 1922–1942

Herbert Juttke (1897–1952) was a British-born German screenwriter who worked on around fifty film screenplays during his career. He frequently collaborated with Georg C. Klaren, working on a number of Expressonist screenplays during the silent and early sound eras. They worked on the scenario for Alfred Hitchcock's 1931 German film Mary. Following the Nazi rise to power, Juttke emigrated to France.

== Filmography ==
- From Morn to Midnight (1920)
- Department Store Princess (1926)
- Die Kleine und ihr Kavalier (1926)
- I Liked Kissing Women (1926)
- Wie bleibe ich jung und schön - Ehegeheimnisse (1926)
- Assassination (1927)
- The Transformation of Dr. Bessel (1927)
- Agitated Women (1927)
- Small Town Sinners (1927)
- Flirtation (1927)
- A Murderous Girl (1927)
- The Great Unknown (1927)
- Odette (1928)
- Sex in Chains (1928)
- The Lady and the Chauffeur (1928)
- Casanova's Legacy (1928)
- In Werder the Trees are in Bloom (1928)
- Fair Game (1928)
- A Knight in London (1928)
- Kolonne X (1929)
- Devotion (1929)
- Marriage in Trouble (1929)
- The Lord of the Tax Office (1929)
- Perjury (1929)
- The Right of the Unborn (1929)
- Incest (1929)
- Cagliostro (1929)
- Somnambul (1929)
- The Hound of the Baskervilles (1929)
- A Knight in London (1929)
- Busy Girls (1930)
- Tenderness (1930)
- Between Night and Dawn (1931)
- Mary (1931)
- Madame Bluebeard (1931)
- Kitty schwindelt sich ins Glück (1932)
- Love Must Be Understood (1933)
- A Thousand for One Night (1933)
- Spies at Work (1933)
- On Secret Service (1933)
- Jeunes filles à marier (1935)
- White Cargo (1937)
- The Cheat (1937)
- The Alibi (1937)
- Un scandale aux galeries (1937)
- I Was an Adventuress (1938)
- Gunshot (1939)
- The Emigrant (1940)
- I Was an Adventuress (1940)
- Alibi (1942)

== Bibliography ==
McGilligan, Patrick. Alfred Hitchcock: A Life in Darkness and Light. HarperCollins, 2004.
