= It Happens Every Day =

1930 film

- Directed by: Hans Natge; Adolf Trotz
- Starring: Walter Rilla; Margarete Kupfer
- Cinematography: Frederik Fuglsang
- Production company: Foreign Film Corporation
- Distributed by: Länderfilm
- Release date: 29 April 1930
- Country: Germany
- Language: German

It Happens Every Day (German: Es kommt alle Tage vor...) is a 1930 German film directed by Hans Natge and Adolf Trotz.

The film's sets were designed by the art director Hermann Warm.

== Cast ==
- Walter Rilla
- Mabel Hariot
- Margarete Kupfer
- Hertha von Walther
- Hans Adalbert Schlettow
- Nicolai von Roessel
- Julius Falkenstein
- Mikhail Rasumny

== Bibliography ==
- Bock, Hans-Michael; Bergfelder, Tim, eds. (2009). The Concise Cinegraph: Encyclopaedia of German Cinema. New York: Berghahn Books. ISBN 978-1-57181-655-9.
