= The Lord of the Tax Office =

1929 film

- Directed by: Siegfried Philippi
- Written by: Herbert Juttke; Georg C. Klaren; Paul Morgan
- Produced by: Gustav Althoff
- Cinematography: Max Grix
- Production company: Aco-Film
- Release date: 24 January 1929
- Country: Germany
- Languages: Silent; German intertitles

The Lord of the Tax Office (German: Der Herr vom Finanzamt) is a 1929 German silent comedy film directed by Siegfried Philippi.

The film's sets were designed by Gustav A. Knauer.

== Cast ==
In alphabetical order

- Corry Bell as Lilly Lugo
- Hans Brausewetter as Dr. Stein
- Johanna Ewald as Alte Schachtel
- Julius Falkenstein as Udo von Langwitz
- Paul Heidemann as Dr. Mehlig
- Trude Lehmann as Rieke
- Gritta Ley as Trix
- Leo Peukert as Adolf Schümichen
- Else Reval as Adolfs Frau
- Franz Stein as Udo von Langwitzs Vater
- Leopold von Ledebur as Regierungsrat Wendel
- Emmy Wyda

== Bibliography ==
- Alfred Krautz. International directory of cinematographers, set- and costume designers in film, Volume 4. Saur, 1984.
