= Robert Lach =

- Born: 26 June 1901; Vienna, Austro-Hungarian Empire
- Died: 8 April 1971 (aged 69); Vienna, Austria
- Other name: Walter Robert Lach
- Occupation: Cinematographer
- Years active: 1925-1940 (film )

Robert Lach (1901–1971) was an Austrian cinematographer.

== Selected filmography ==
- Joyless Street (1925)
- Secrets of a Soul (1926)
- Unmarried Daughters (1926)
- Sex in Chains (1928)
- The Insurmountable (1928)
- The Woman in the Advocate's Gown (1929)
- Tragedy of Youth (1929)
- The Right of the Unborn (1929)
- Somnambul (1929)
- Eros in Chains (1929)
- Three Days Confined to Barracks (1930)
- Poor as a Church Mouse (1931)
- Weekend in Paradise (1931)
- For Once I'd Like to Have No Troubles (1932)
- A Thousand for One Night (1933)
- Judgement Day (1940)

== Bibliography ==
- Kreimeier, Klaus. The Ufa story: a history of Germany's greatest film company, 1918–1945. University of California Press, 1999.
