= The Curse of Vererbung =

1927 film

- Directed by: Adolf Trotz
- Written by: Curt Thomalla
- Starring: Marcella Albani; Maly Delschaft; Carl de Vogt
- Cinematography: Johannes Männling; Theodor Sparkuhl
- Music by: Felix Bartsch
- Production company: Bieber Film-Produktion
- Distributed by: Filmhaus Bruckmann
- Release date: 26 August 1927
- Country: Germany
- Languages: Silent; German intertitles

The Curse of Vererbung (German:Der Fluch der Vererbung) (The Curse of Heredity: Those Who Should Not Be Mothers) is a 1927 German silent film directed by Adolf Trotz and starring Marcella Albani, Maly Delschaft and Carl de Vogt.

The film's sets were designed by the art director Leopold Blonder.

== Cast ==
- Marcella Albani as Olga
- Maly Delschaft as Magda
- Carl de Vogt as Dr. Münchow
- Leopold von Ledebur as Hartmann. Olgas Mann
- Alex Allin as Franz, sein Sohn
- Fritz Kampers as Karl, sein zweiter Sohn
- Georg John as Portier
- Irma Green as Betty, Zofe
- Frida Richard as Olgas Mutter
- Carla Bartheel as Krankenschwester

== Bibliography ==
- Rogowski, Christian. The Many Faces of Weimar Cinema: Rediscovering Germany's Filmic Legacy. Camden House, 2010.
