= Sixteen Daughters and No Father =

1928 film

- Directed by: Adolf Trotz
- Written by: Richard Jäger; Leo Mittler
- Starring: Paul Graetz; Camilla Spira
- Cinematography: Marius Holdt
- Music by: Pasquale Perris
- Production company: Essem-Film
- Distributed by: Vereinigte Star-Film
- Release date: 23 October 1928
- Country: Germany
- Languages: Silent; German intertitles

Sixteen Daughters and No Father (German: Sechzehn Töchter und kein Papa) is a 1928 German silent comedy film directed by Adolf Trotz and starring Paul Graetz and Camilla Spira.

The film's art direction was by August Rinaldi.

== Cast ==
In alphabetical order

- Maly Delschaft
- Lia Eibenschütz
- Paul Graetz
- Helmut Körnig
- René Molnar
- Anton Pointner
- Else Reval
- Camilla Spira
- Walter Steinbeck
- Kurt Vespermann
- Emmy Wyda

== Bibliography ==
- James Robert Parish. Film Actors Guide. Scarecrow Press, 1977.
