= The Hound of the Baskervilles (1929 film) =

1929 film directed by Richard Oswald

- Screenshot of Watson (left) and Holmes (right) on the moors
- Directed by: Richard Oswald
- Written by: Georg C. Klaren; Herbert Juttke
- Based on: The Hound of the Baskervilles; 1902 novel by Sir Arthur Conan Doyle
- Produced by: Fred Lyssa; F. W. Kraemer
- Starring: Carlyle Blackwell; Alexander Murski; Livio Pavanelli; Fritz Rasp
- Cinematography: Frederik Fuglsang
- Production company: Erda-Film
- Distributed by: Süd-Film
- Release date: 28 August 1929
- Running time: 87 minutes
- Country: Germany
- Languages: Silent; German intertitles

The Hound of the Baskervilles (1929) by Richard Oswald

The Hound of the Baskervilles (German: Der Hund von Baskerville) is a 1929 German silent mystery film directed by Richard Oswald and is an adaptation of the 1902 Sherlock Holmes novel The Hound of the Baskervilles by Arthur Conan Doyle. The film stars Carlyle Blackwell as Sherlock Holmes and George Seroff as Dr. Watson, with Betty Bird, Alexander Murski, and Livio Pavanelli in supporting roles. It tells the story of Holmes (Blackwell) investigating the mysterious death of Sir Charles Baskerville, believed to be caused by a supernatural hound haunting the Baskerville family. This was the last Sherlock Holmes adaptation of the silent film era.

The Hound of the Baskervilles featured an unusually international cast, including American actor Carlyle Blackwell, German actor Fritz Rasp, British actress Alma Taylor, Russian actor Alexander Murski, and Italian actor Livio Pavanelli.

The Hound of the Baskervilles premiered on 8 August 1929 to generally positive reviews, with praise for Blackwell's portrayal of Sherlock Holmes, although some criticized its uneven pacing. Despite being a silent film released during the transition to sound cinema, it performed moderately well at the box-office.

In 2009, a tape of the film, along with other lost films from the silent cinema era, was discovered in the basement of a church in Sosnowiec, Poland. A decade later, in 2019, Flicker Alley released a digitally restored version of the film on DVD and Blu-ray, along with the 1914 version of the story.

== Plot ==
The film opens with the sudden and mysterious death of Sir Charles Baskerville. His body is discovered near his family’s ancestral home on the desolate moors of Devonshire, with a look of terror frozen on his face. Near his body, large paw prints are found, leading many to believe that the legendary Baskerville curse—the ghostly hound that haunts the family—has struck again. The curse is said to stem from a brutal crime committed by an ancestor of the Baskerville family, and the hound has been believed to torment the family for generations.

With Sir Charles dead, his heir, Sir Henry Baskerville, returns from Canada to claim his inheritance. Concerned for Sir Henry’s safety, the family’s friend, Dr. James Mortimer, approaches Sherlock Holmes for help. Dr. Mortimer recounts the legend of the hound and expresses fear that Sir Henry might be the next victim. Holmes, intrigued but skeptical about the supernatural element, agrees to take the case.

Holmes decides to send Dr. Watson to accompany Sir Henry to Baskerville Hall while he remains in London to continue his investigation in secret. Watson’s role is to observe and report back to Holmes, while also keeping Sir Henry safe. Upon arriving at Baskerville Hall, Watson notes the gloomy atmosphere of the moors and the imposing estate. He quickly realizes that there is more to the case than the legend of the hound.

During his stay, Watson encounters several suspicious characters. The family servants, Mr. and Mrs. Barrymore, act strangely, particularly at night. Watson notices the Barrymores signaling someone on the moors using a lantern, which raises his suspicions. Meanwhile, Watson meets the local naturalist Stapleton, a seemingly friendly man who lives nearby with his sister, Beryl Stapleton. Beryl, in a moment of fear, secretly warns Sir Henry to leave the moors, implying that he is in grave danger.

As Watson continues his investigation, eerie events unfold. The terrifying howls of what seem to be a large beast are heard at night across the moors, adding to the belief that the Baskerville curse is real. Watson tries to piece together the mystery, but without Holmes by his side, he feels uncertain about the strange occurrences.

Holmes, who has secretly been conducting his own investigation, eventually arrives in Devonshire. He reveals to Watson that the mysterious figure on the moors is Selden, an escaped convict who has been hiding with the help of the Barrymores, who are related to him. However, this discovery is only part of the larger mystery.

Holmes uncovers the truth: the legendary hound is not supernatural but a flesh-and-blood dog trained by Stapleton. It turns out that Stapleton is a distant relative of the Baskerville family, and his goal is to eliminate Sir Henry and claim the family estate for himself. Stapleton has been using the legend of the hound to cover up his murderous plan, taking advantage of the family’s fear of the curse.

In the film’s climax, Holmes, Watson, and Sir Henry confront the hound on the moors. The massive dog, trained to be vicious and appear terrifying, attacks Sir Henry. Holmes and Watson manage to kill the hound before it can fatally wound Sir Henry. In a desperate attempt to escape, Stapleton flees across the Grimpen Mire, a dangerous and treacherous bog. Pursued by Holmes and Watson, Stapleton becomes trapped in the mire and sinks to his death.

With the mystery solved, the curse of the Baskerville hound is exposed as a fabrication created by Stapleton’s greed and cunning. Sir Henry is saved, and peace is restored to Baskerville Hall. Holmes and Watson return to London, having put an end to the dark legacy of the Baskerville family.

== Cast ==
- Carlyle Blackwell as Sherlock Holmes
- Alexander Murski as Lord Charles Baskerville
- Livio Pavanelli as Sir Henry Baskerville
- George Seroff as Dr. Watson
- Betty Bird as Beryl
- Fritz Rasp as Stapleton
- Valy Arnheim as Barrymore
- Alma Taylor as Mrs. Barrymore
- Carla Bartheel as Laura Lyons
- Jaro Fürth as Dr. Mortimer
- Robert Garrison as Falkland

== Production ==
Richard Oswald had previously adapted Conan Doyle's The Hound of the Baskervilles for the 1914 German serial Der Hund von Baskerville. However, the 1929 film was not a remake of that serial but a direct adaptation of Doyle's original novel.

The British-based American actor Carlyle Blackwell was cast as Sherlock Holmes, selected for the role because he was considered "suitably Britannic."

The film’s sets were designed by art director Willy Schiller, and it was filmed at Staaken Studios in Berlin.

== Reception ==
Despite the high production values, the film was a commercial failure. Critic Troy Howarth noted that the film was "a commercial disaster," effectively ending German cinema's interest in Sherlock Holmes until 1936, when another version of The Hound of the Baskervilles was produced.
