= Gerd Briese =

German actor (1897–1957)

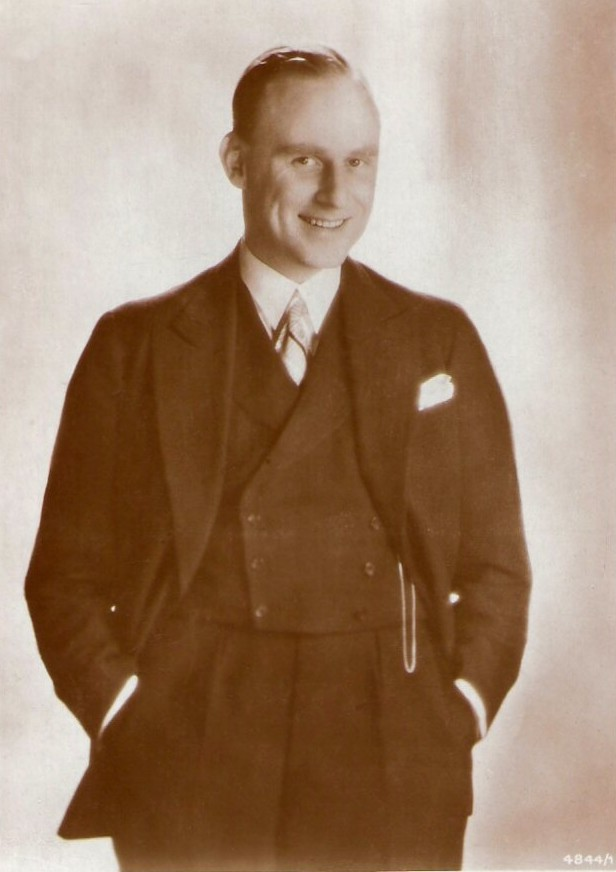
- Born: 27 December 1897; Thorn, West Prussia, German Empire
- Died: 13 August 1957 (aged 59); West Berlin, West Germany
- Other name: Gert Briese
- Occupations: Actor, theatre director
- Years active: 1924–1957

Gerd Briese (25 December 1897 – 13 August 1957) was a German stage and film actor.

Briese's film career began in 1924, and he later worked as a stage actor and director. He was killed in a traffic accident in the Wilmersdorf district of West Berlin in 1957, aged 59.

== Selected filmography ==
- Rosenmontag (1924)
- Reveille: The Great Awakening (1925)
- In the Valleys of the Southern Rhine (1925)
- Accommodations for Marriage (1926)
- The Sea Cadet (1926)
- The Flames Lie (1926)
- The Pirates of the Baltic Sea (1926)
- The Flames Lie (1926)
- U-9 Weddigen (1927)
- Linden Lady on the Rhine (1927)
- Forbidden Love (1927)
- Radio Magic (1927)
- Lützow's Wild Hunt (1927)
- A Day of Roses in August (1927)
- I Stand in the Dark Midnight (1927)
- Fair Game (1928)
- Sex in Chains (1928)
- The Lady from Argentina (1928)
- Roses Bloom on the Moorland (1929)
- Perjury (1929)
- The Customs Judge (1929)

== Bibliography ==
- Kester, Bernadette. Film Front Weimar: Representations of the First World War in German films of the Weimar Period (1919-1933). Amsterdam University Press, 2003.
