= The Customs Judge =

1929 film

- Directed by: Carl Heinz Wolff
- Written by: Marie Luise Droop
- Produced by: Gustav Althoff
- Starring: Margarete Schlegel; Gerd Briese; Margarete Kupfer
- Cinematography: Max Grix
- Music by: Michael Buchstab
- Production company: Albö-Film
- Distributed by: Albö-Film
- Release date: 31 May 1929
- Country: Germany
- Languages: Silent; German intertitles

The Customs Judge (German: Der Sittenrichter) is a 1929 German silent film directed by Carl Heinz Wolff and starring Margarete Schlegel, Gerd Briese and Margarete Kupfer.

The film's sets were designed by Gustav A. Knauer.

== Cast ==
- Margarete Schlegel as Susi Böhm
- Gerd Briese as Hans Herrmann
- Margarete Kupfer as Frau Böhm
- Rudolf Lettinger as Justizwachmeister Böhm
- Erna Morena as Liddy Lohwald
- Carl Auen as Hilmer
- Leopold von Ledebur as Dr. Lohwald
- Maria Forescu as Frau mit dem dunkeln Gewerbe
- Julius Falkenstein as Kriminalkommissar
- Ilse Nast as Eine Verurteilte
- Kurt Brenkendorf as der Vater
- Maria Kromer as die Mutter

== Bibliography ==
- Krautz, Alfred (1984). International Directory of Cinematographers, Set and Costume Designers in Film. Vol. 4. Saur.
