= Flachsmann the Educator =

1930 film

- Directed by: Carl Heinz Wolff
- Written by: Otto Ernst (play); Franz Rauch; Michael Urak
- Produced by: Carl Heinz Wolff
- Starring: Paul Henckels; Charlotte Ander; Alfred Braun
- Cinematography: Alfred Hansen; Georg Muschner
- Music by: Bernard Homola
- Production company: Carl Heinz Wolff-Filmproduktion
- Distributed by: National Film
- Release date: 7 November 1930
- Running time: 92 minutes
- Country: Germany
- Language: German

Flachsmann the Educator (German: Flachsmann als Erzieher) is a 1930 German comedy film directed by Carl Heinz Wolff and starring Paul Henckels, Charlotte Ander and Alfred Braun. It was shot at the Babelsberg Studios in Berlin. The film's sets were designed by the art director Willi Herrmann.

== Cast ==
- Paul Henckels as Jügen Heinrich Flachsmann
- Charlotte Ander as Gisa Holm
- Alfred Braun as Jan Flemming
- Gustav Rickelt as Schulrat Prell
- Hedwig Wangel as Mutter von Jan Flemming
- Lionel Royce as Karsten Diercks
- Kurt Lilien as Schuldiener Negendank
- Carl de Vogt as Vogelsang
- Rolf Weih as Römer
- Wilhelm P. Krüger as Weidenbaum
- Hans Sternberg as Riemann
- Mathilde Sussin as Betty Sturhahn

== Bibliography ==
- Bock, Hans-Michael; Bergfelder, Tim, eds. (2009). The Concise Cinegraph: Encyclopaedia of German Cinema. Berghahn Books. ISBN 978-1-57181-655-9.
