= What's Wrong with Nanette? =

1929 film

- Directed by: Holger-Madsen
- Written by: Marie Luise Droop; Hasso Price
- Produced by: Ruth Weyher
- Starring: Ruth Weyher; Georg Alexander; Harry Hardt
- Cinematography: Hans Karl Gottschalk; Günther Rittau
- Production company: Ruth Weyher Film
- Release date: 7 November 1929
- Country: Germany
- Languages: Silent; German intertitles

What's Wrong with Nanette? (German: Was ist los mit Nanette?) is a 1929 German silent film directed by Holger-Madsen and starring Ruth Weyher, Georg Alexander and Harry Hardt.

== Cast ==
In alphabetical order

- Georg Alexander as Nachtredakteur Dr. Richard Curtius
- Hanne Brinkmann as Haushälterin Maria
- Harry Gondi as Reporter Peter Flachs
- Karl Harbacher as Faktotum für alles
- Harry Hardt as Theodor 'Toto' Thomas
- Hans Junkermann as Theaterdirektor Runkel
- Margarete Kupfer as Tante Finchen
- Maria Mindzenty as Anita Morell
- Fritz Spira as Chefredakteur
- Ruth Weyher as Frau Dr. Curtius / Nanette

== Bibliography ==
- Alfred Krautz. International directory of cinematographers, set- and costume designers in film, Volume 4. Saur, 1984.
