= Caught in Berlin's Underworld =

1927 film

- Directed by: Martin Berger
- Written by: Dosio Koffler
- Produced by: Martin Berger
- Starring: Fritz Kortner; Maly Delschaft; Hans Stüwe
- Cinematography: Franz Planer
- Music by: Felix Bartsch
- Production company: William Kahn-Film
- Distributed by: Martin Berger Film
- Release date: 1 November 1927
- Running time: 92 minutes
- Country: Germany
- Languages: Silent; German intertitles

Caught in Berlin's Underworld or The Outcasts (German: Die Ausgestoßenen) is a 1927 German silent drama film directed by Martin Berger and starring Fritz Kortner, Maly Delschaft and Hans Stüwe. It was shot at the EFA Studios in Berlin and on location around Lüneburg Heath. The film's sets were designed by the art director Otto Gülstorff.

== Cast ==
- Fritz Kortner as Lord
- Maly Delschaft as Frau Nadt
- Hans Stüwe as Nadt / Dr. Themal
- Mary Johnson as Hilde Maroff
- Julia Serda as Maroffs Frau
- Rudolf Lettinger as Maroff
- Luigi Serventi as Graf Egglio
- Andreas Behrens-Klausen as Gefangener
- Johanna Hofer as Frau des Gefangenen
- Heinrich George

== Bibliography ==
- Grange, William. Cultural Chronicle of the Weimar Republic. Scarecrow Press, 2008.
