= Sin of a Beautiful Woman =

1929 film

- Directed by: Karel Lamač
- Written by: Václav Wasserman
- Starring: Josef Rovenský; Marcella Albani; Gaston Jacquet
- Cinematography: Otto Heller
- Production company: Bratři Deglové
- Distributed by: UFA
- Release date: 25 October 1929
- Country: Czechoslovakia
- Languages: Silent; Czech intertitles

Sin of a Beautiful Woman (Czech: Hříchy lásky) is a 1929 Czech silent drama film directed by Karel Lamač and starring Josef Rovenský, Marcella Albani and Gaston Jacquet. It was shot in Kavalírka studio in Prague.

== Cast ==
- Josef Rovenský as Actor Ivan Kristen
- Marcella Albani as Actress Soňa Kristenová
- Gaston Jacquet as Eduard Warren
- Walter Rilla as Actor Richard Kent
- Ladislav H. Struna as Thief Ferda Štika
- Karel Schleichert as Old Taverner
- Alois Charvát as Director of Provincial Theatre
- Josef Šváb-Malostranský as Provincial Actor
- Ludvík Veverka as Warren's Assistant
- Bronislava Livia as Mimi Stevensová
- Bohumil Kovář as Director
- Jiří Červený as Intendant of the Great Theatre
- Čeněk Šlégl as Warren's Secretary
- Betty Kysilková as Prompter
- Theodor Pištěk as Police Commissioner
- Ernst Waldow as Examining Officer

== Release ==
In 2017 the film was restored by Czech Film Archive. New electronic music was created by Johana Ožvold, Martin Ožvold and Jan Kratochvíl.
