= The Prisoner (1920 film) =

1920 film

- Directed by: Carl Heinz Wolff
- Written by: Paul Oskar Höcker; Carl Heinz Wolff
- Starring: Harry Liedtke; Käthe Dorsch; Reinhold Schünzel
- Production company: Kowo-Gesellschaft für Filmfabrikation
- Release date: 10 June 1920
- Country: Germany
- Languages: Silent; German intertitles

The Prisoner (German: Der Gefangene) is a 1920 German silent drama film directed by Carl Heinz Wolff and starring Harry Liedtke, Käthe Dorsch and Reinhold Schünzel.

== Cast ==
- Harry Liedtke as Temme, Fritz, Bräutigam, Sohn
- Käthe Dorsch as Crusius, Hertha, Tochter, Braut
- Reinhold Schünzel as Französischer Lagerkommandant
- Kurt Brenkendorf as Puppenkünstler Gustav Raitz
- Max Lehmann as Vater Huber
- Wilhelm Richter as Professor Crusius
- Hans Ritter as Unteroffizier Bartsch
- Fritz Schroeter as Bahnwärter Lehmann
- Maria Schuh-Wildner as Mutter Huber
- Ellen Stavriedes as Tänzerin Odette
- Magda Elgen as Tochter Lene Huber
- Leopold Gadiel as Abgeordneter Fabrikbesitzer Temmer
- Heinz Alexander
- Paul Bildt
- Julius Brandt
- Lia Eibenschütz
- Ilka Grüning

== Bibliography ==
- Bock, Hans-Michael & Bergfelder, Tim. The Concise CineGraph. Encyclopedia of German Cinema. Berghahn Books, 2009.
