= The Right to Live (1927 film) =

1927 film

- Directed by: Robert Wohlmuth
- Written by: Friedrich Koslowsky; Rosa Wachtel
- Starring: Maly Delschaft; Erna Morena; Elizza La Porta
- Cinematography: Ludwig Schaschek
- Production companies: Condor-Film; Ottol-Film
- Release date: 23 March 1927
- Countries: Austria; Germany
- Languages: Silent; German intertitles

The Right to Live (German: Das Recht zu leben) is a 1927 Austrian-German silent film directed by Robert Wohlmuth and starring Maly Delschaft, Erna Morena, and Elizza La Porta.

The film's sets were designed by the art directors Hans Rouc and Stefan Wessely.

== Cast ==
- Maly Delschaft
- Erna Morena
- Elizza La Porta
- Anna Kallina
- Clementine Plessner
- Hans Unterkircher
- Walter Slezak
- Viktor Franz
- Hans Peppler
- Gina Puch-Klitsch
- Willy Pouché

== Bibliography ==
- Kasten, Jürgen; Bruns, Brigitte (2005). Erna Morena. Munich: Belleville. ISBN 978-3-936298-52-9.
