= The Big Number =

1943 film directed by Karl Anton

- Directed by: Karl Anton
- Written by: Karl Anton; Erwin Biswanger; Alexander Lix; Harry Piel; Felix von Eckardt
- Produced by: Karl Anton
- Starring: Leny Marenbach; Maly Delschaft; Paul Hoffmann
- Cinematography: Georg Bruckbauer; Walter Roßkopf
- Edited by: Elise Lustig
- Music by: Friedrich Schröder
- Production company: Tobis Film
- Distributed by: Deutsche Filmvertriebs
- Release date: 8 January 1943
- Running time: 98 minutes
- Country: Germany
- Language: German

The Big Number or The Big Act (German: Die große Nummer) is a 1943 German drama film directed by Karl Anton and starring Leny Marenbach, Maly Delschaft and Paul Hoffmann. A circus film, it was originally intended to star Harry Piel but due to delays on Panic he withdrew from the project, although he had contributed to the screenplay. Location shooting took place at the Circus Sarrasani in Dresden. The film's sets were designed by the art director Willy Schiller. It was one of three entertainment-focused films playing in Berlin at the time of the Sportpalast speech by Joseph Goebbels calling for total war.

== Cast ==
- Leny Marenbach as Helga Wallner
- Maly Delschaft as Marion Wallner
- Paul Hoffmann as Heinrich Wallner
- Rudolf Prack as Peter Stoll
- Paul Kemp as Otto Gellert
- Charlott Daudert as Mariettchen
- Marina Ried as Bianca
- Karl Günther as Direktor Kroll
- Maria Horstweg as Frau Roselli
- Walter Janssen as Zeller
- Heinz Klingenberg as Dr. Buchner
- Rose Rauch as Singer
- Hans Adalbert Schlettow as Basto-Bastelmeyer

== Bibliography ==
- Echternkamp, Jörg. Germany and the Second World War Volume IX/II: German Wartime Society 1939-1945: Exploitation, Interpretations. OUP, 2014.
- Skopal, Pavel & Winkel, Roel Vande (ed.) Film Professionals in Nazi-Occupied Europe: Mediation Between the National-Socialist Cultural “New Order” and Local Structures. Springer Nature, 2021.
