= The Right of the Unborn =

1929 film

- Directed by: Adolf Trotz
- Written by: Herbert Juttke; Georg C. Klaren; Ruth Schering
- Starring: Maly Delschaft; Elizza La Porta; Hans Adalbert Schlettow; Wolfgang Zilzer
- Cinematography: Robert Lach
- Music by: Walter Ulfig
- Production company: Detro-Film
- Distributed by: Filmhaus Bruckmann
- Release date: 7 June 1929
- Country: Germany
- Languages: Silent; German intertitles

The Right of the Unborn (German: Das Recht der Ungeborenen) is a 1929 German silent drama film directed by Adolf Trotz and starring Maly Delschaft, Elizza La Porta and Hans Adalbert Schlettow. The film is in the Weimar tradition of Enlightenment films. It examines the question of abortion of unborn children. Unlike several other German films of the era, it is generally anti-abortion. It was shot at the Halensee Studios in Berlin. The film's art direction is by Hans Jacoby.

== Cast ==
- Maly Delschaft as Elsa Lohrmann
- Elizza La Porta as Elli
- Hans Adalbert Schlettow as Rolf Stürmer
- Wolfgang Zilzer as Fredy
- Fritz Kampers as Peter Mahler
- Iwa Wanja as Anni, Fredys Freundin
- Robby Roberts as Fritzchen
- Curt Cappi as Frauenarzt Dr. Wehner
- Eva Speyer

== Bibliography ==
- Prawer, S.S. (2005). Between Two Worlds: The Jewish Presence in German and Austrian Film, 1910–1933. Berghahn Books.
