= Op Hoop van Zegen (1924 film) =

1924 film by James Bauer and Henk Kleinmann

Op hoop van zegen
- Directed by: James Bauer; Henk Kleinmann
- Written by: Herman Heijermans (play); Armin Petersen
- Produced by: Henk Kleinmann
- Cinematography: Karl Hasselmann
- Release date: 12 December 1924
- Running time: 95 minutes
- Country: Netherlands
- Language: Silent

Op hoop van zegen is a 1924 Dutch silent drama film directed by James Bauer and Henk Kleinmann. it received the Publieksprijs Nederlandse Filmdagen.

The film is the second screen version of the play by Herman Heijermans.

== Cast ==
- Adele Sandrock – Kniertje
- Hans Adalbert Schlettow – Geert
- Erwin Biswanger – Bos
- Paula Batzer – Clementine
- Werner Funck – Reder Bos
- Joseph Klein – Simon
- Lotte Steinhoff
- Barbara von Annenkoff – Jo
