= Somnambul =

1929 film

- Directed by: Adolf Trotz
- Written by: Herbert Juttke; Georg C. Klaren
- Produced by: Leo Meyer
- Starring: Fritz Kortner; Erna Morena; Veit Harlan; Jaro Fürth
- Cinematography: Robert Lach
- Production company: Essem-Film
- Distributed by: Vereinigte Star-Film
- Release date: 7 February 1929
- Country: Germany
- Languages: Silent; German intertitles

Somnambul is a 1929 German silent horror film directed by Adolf Trotz and starring Fritz Kortner, Erna Morena and Veit Harlan. The film is set against the backdrop of spiritualism. The Berlin clairvoyant Elsbeth Guenther-Geffers appeared in the film. The film's art director was August Rinaldi.

== Cast ==
- Fritz Kortner as Fabrikant Bingen
- Erna Morena as Helga, seine Frau
- Veit Harlan as Kurt Bingen, beider Sohn
- Jaro Fürth as Dr. Höchster
- Eva von Berne as Amélie, seine Tochter
- Fritz Kampers as Maxe, eine zweifelhafte Existenz
- Uly Boutry as Myra, das Medium
- Julius Falkenstein as Spinelli, der Hypnotiseur
- Elsbeth Guenther-Geffers as Die Hellseherin
- Georg John as Der Wirt

== Bibliography ==
- Noack, Frank. Veit Harlan: The Life and Work of a Nazi Filmmaker. University Press of Kentucky, 2016.
- Prawer, S.S. Between Two Worlds: The Jewish Presence in German and Austrian Film, 1910–1933. Berghahn Books, 2005. ISBN 978-1-84545-074-8
