= The Duty to Remain Silent =

1928 film directed by Carl Wilhelm

- Directed by: Carl Wilhelm
- Written by: Friedrich Werner van Oestéren (novel); Alexander Alexander; Carl Wilhelm
- Starring: Marcella Albani; Vivian Gibson; Angelo Ferrari; Charlotte Susa
- Cinematography: Franz Planer
- Music by: Paul Dessau
- Production company: Ama-Film
- Distributed by: Ama-Film
- Release date: 8 February 1928
- Country: Germany
- Languages: Silent; German intertitles

The Duty to Remain Silent (German: Die Pflicht zu schweigen) is a 1928 German silent drama film directed by Carl Wilhelm and starring Marcella Albani, Vivian Gibson, and Angelo Ferrari. It was based on a novel by Friedrich Werner van Oestéren. The film's art direction was by Max Heilbronner. It premiered on 8 February 1928.

== Cast ==
- Marcella Albani as Maria Harp
- Vivian Gibson as Edith, ihre Schwester
- Angelo Ferrari as Robert Harp
- Charlotte Susa as Eva Devin, seine Geliebte
- Julia Serda as Frau Jorin
- Camilla von Hollay as Emmy, ihre Tochter
- Jack Trevor as Robert, ihr Sohn
- Gustav Fröhlich as Gerhard, ihr Sohn
- Kurt Gerron as Iwan Daniloff
- Mary Kid as Hilde Ronk
- Bruno Kastner as Dr. Garonder
- Ellen Plessow as Frau von Storch
- Paul Samson-Körner as Jack
- Sophie Pagay as Die Wirtschafterin
- Heinrich Gotho as Der Diener

== Bibliography ==
- Grange, William. Cultural Chronicle of the Weimar Republic. Scarecrow Press, 2008.
