= Cagliostro (1929 film) =

1929 film directed by Richard Oswald

- Directed by: Richard Oswald
- Screenplay by: Georg C. Klaren; Herbert Juttke
- Based on: A novel by Johannes von Guenther
- Produced by: Vladimir Vengerov; Alexandre Kamenka
- Starring: Hans Stüwe
- Cinematography: Jules Krüger; Maurice Desfassiaux
- Music by: Werner Schmidt-Boelcke
- Production companies: Les Films Albatros; Wengeroff-Film GmbH
- Release dates: 8 April 1929 (Berlin); 21 May 1929 (Paris)
- Countries: France; Germany

Cagliostro (1929)

Cagliostro is a 1929 silent drama film directed by Richard Oswald and starring Hans Stüwe, Renée Héribel and Alfred Abel. It depicts the life of the eighteenth century Italian occultist Alessandro Cagliostro, portraying him more sympathetically than in most other works. It was based on a novel by Johannes von Guenther.

== Cast ==
- Hans Stüwe as Cagliostro
- Renée Héribel as Lorenza
- Alfred Abel as Prince de Rohan
- Ivan Koval-Samborsky as Benito
- Rina De Liguoro as Laura, Marquise Espada
- Charles Dullin as Marquis de Espada-Comte de Breteil
- Illa Meery as Jeanne de la Motte
- Edmond Van Daële as Louis XVI
- Suzanne Bianchetti as Marie Antoinette
- Jules Moy as Bohmer
- Georges Deneubourg as Basange
- Alice Tissot as Duchesse de Mittau
- René Donnio as Chevreau
- Jeannie Luxeuil
- Andrée Canti
- Roger Karl
- Andrews Engelmann
- Nicolas Rimsky
- Teddy Michaud

== Release ==
Caligostro premiered in Berlin on 8 April 1929. It was later shown in Paris on 21 May 1929. In the early 1930s, Universal Pictures planned a Cagliostro film starring Boris Karloff in the title role, which was later re-written into the script for The Mummy.

== Reception ==
A reviewer in Variety commented on the film on a screening in Germany, stating that "Richard Oswald always gets somebody to invest money again in his productions and always turns out about the same sort of product. A lot of pomp, scenery and costumes and nothing that grips in the acting line." and that Oswald "leaves Continental audiences as cold as he would American ones."

== Bibliography ==
- Prawer, Siegbert Salomon (2005). Between Two Worlds: The Jewish Presence in German and Austrian Film, 1910–1933. New York: Berghahn Books. ISBN 978-1-84545-074-8.
- Pitts, Michael R. (2018). Thrills Untapped: Neglected Horror, Science Fiction and Fantasy Films, 1928-1936. McFarland. ISBN 978-1476632896.
- Workman, Christopher; Howarth, Troy (2016). Tome of Terror: Horror Films of the Silent Era. Baltimore: Midnight Marquee Press. ISBN 978-1-936168-68-2.
