= Der Hund von Baskerville =

1914 film by Rudolf Meinert

- Directed by: Rudolf Meinert
- Written by: Richard Oswald
- Based on: The Hound of the Baskervilles; 1902 novel by Sir Arthur Conan Doyle
- Produced by: Jules Greenbaum
- Starring: Alwin Neuß
- Cinematography: Werner Brandes; Karl Freund
- Music by: Joachim Bärenz
- Release date: 12 June 1914
- Running time: Five reels
- Country: Germany
- Languages: Silent; German intertitles

Der Hund von Baskerville is a 1914 German silent film adaptation of Arthur Conan Doyle's 1902 novel The Hound of the Baskervilles, the first film adaptation of the work. According to the website silentera.com, the film was considered lost, but has been rediscovered; the Russian Gosfilmofond film archive possesses a print, while the Filmmuseum München has a 35mm positive print.

In 2019, the film received a wide home media release by Flicker Alley, along with the 1929 version.

== Plot summary ==
Charles Baskerville suffers a heart attack after being terrorised by the notorious hound of the Baskervilles, a portent of doom for the male heirs of the Baskerville castle. When the family solicitor sends word to his nephew, Henry Baskerville, that he should attend a reading of the will, the man servant Barrymore adds a message warning him to stay away. He has been working with Stapleton, another Baskerville relative, in his plan to kill everyone who stands in the way of him inheriting the castle. Stapleton has been keeping the hound in an underground lair, and has also prepared various bombs to use against Henry if he arrives. Henry Baskerville saves Laura Lyons when her horses bolt and they start courting. Henry sends for Sherlock Holmes in a letter, but Stapleton blows up the postbox and disguises himself as Sherlock Holmes. The real Holmes reads in the newspaper about his supposed arrival in Devon and decides to check it out. Stapleton plants a bomb in a light fitting. Holmes defuses the bomb with a shot from a pistol. Stapleton blames Barrymore for the attack. Stapleton then tries poisoning Henry and Laura but Holmes fires his pistol at the glasses. Barrymore is blamed once again. Investigating Stapleton's room Holmes discovers a secret diary revealing his plans. Finding Holmes in his room, Stapleton activates a hidden trapdoor by turning a vase which drops Holmes into the lair of the hound. Holmes then kills the hound and escapes. He then disguises himself as Stapleton. Stapleton confronts Holmes and removes his disguise. They fight. Barrymore disguised as a suit of armour captures Stapleton. Holmes shows everyone the diary and Stapleton is arrested.

== Cast ==
- Alwin Neuß as Sherlock Holmes
- Friedrich Kühne as Stapleton
- Hanni Weisse as Laura Lyons
- Erwin Fichtner as Henry von Baskerville
- Andreas Van Horn as Barrymore – Kammerdiener
- Unknown actor as Dr. Watson

== History ==
In 1907, Richard Oswald mounted a version of The Hound of the Baskervilles in Praterstraße based on Der Hund von Baskerville: Schauspiel in vier Aufzügen aus dem Schottischen Hochland. Frei nach Motiven aus Poes und Doyles Novellen (The Hound of the Baskervilles: a play in four acts set in the Scottish Highlands. Freely adapted from the stories of Poe and Doyle) which was written by Ferdinand Bonn.

By 1914, Oswald was working as a script supervisor at Union-Vitascope studios in the Weißensee Studios. Films based on mystery novels were very successful in German cinema at the time so Oswald found himself in the position to pen a film script based on The Hound of the Baskervilles.

== Production ==
Richard Oswald penned the tale which blended Doyle's original story and Der Hund von Baskerville and Rudolf Meinert was tasked with the direction.

Alwin Neuß was cast to portray Sherlock Holmes in Der Hund von Baskerville. Neuß had previously played the role in 1910's Das Milliontestament.

Der Hund von Baskerville was so successful, it spawned five more films: Das einsame Haus, Das unheimliche Zimmer, Die Sage vom Hund von Baskerville, Dr. MacDonalds Sanatorium, and Das Haus ohne Fenster. Neuß played Holmes in the first three sequels, but was replaced in the last two by Erich Kaiser-Titz.

== See also ==
- List of rediscovered films
