= Give Me Life =

1928 film

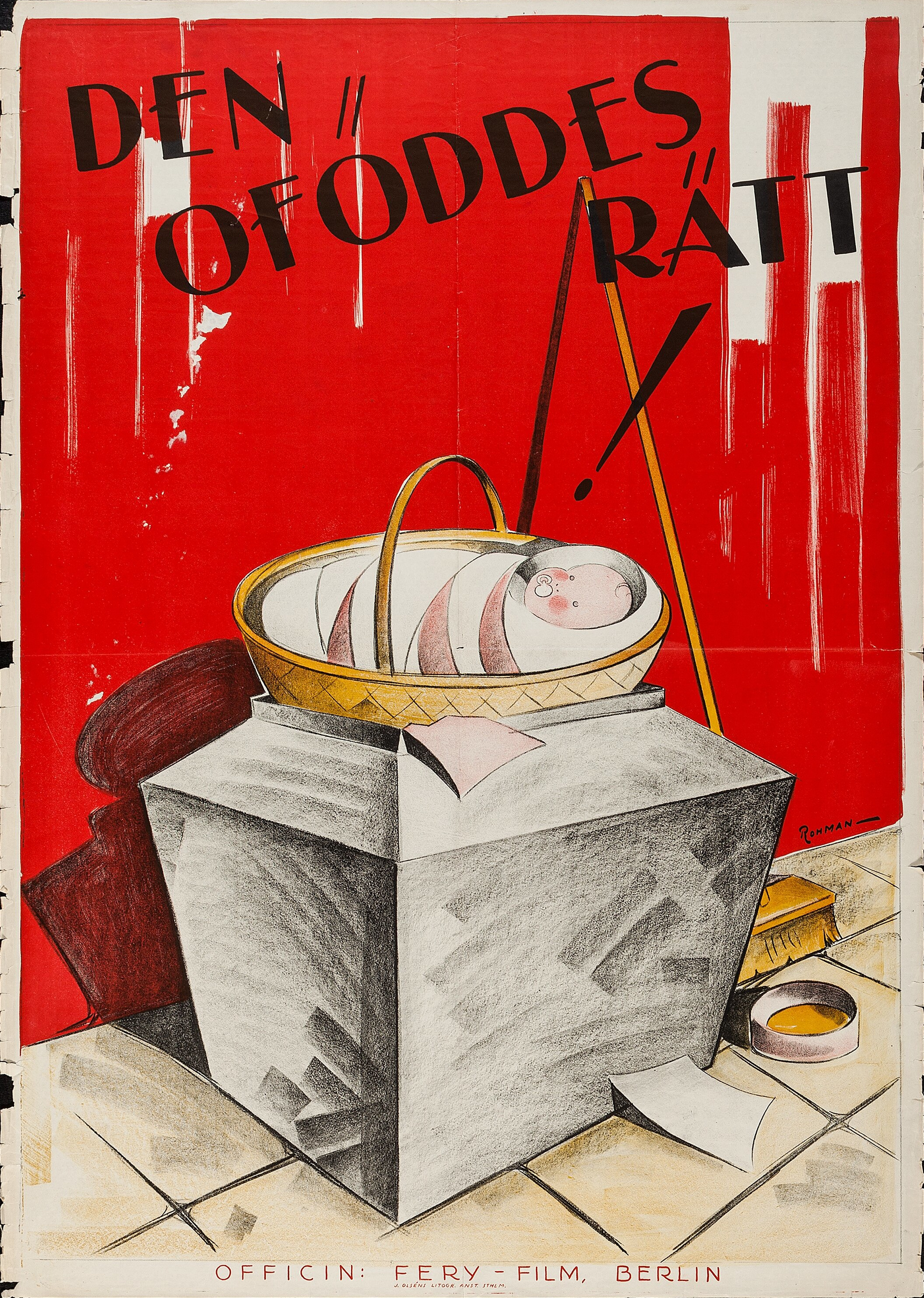
- Swedish theatrical release poster
- Directed by: Klaus Fery
- Written by: Klaus Fery; Ruth Goetz
- Produced by: Klaus Fery
- Starring: Grete Reinwald; Henry Stuart; Elizza La Porta
- Cinematography: Karl Attenberger; Guido Seeber
- Production company: Fery-Film
- Release date: January 1928
- Country: Germany
- Languages: Silent; German intertitles

Give Me Life (German: Schenk mir das Leben) is a 1928 German silent drama film directed by Klaus Fery and starring Grete Reinwald, Henry Stuart and Elizza La Porta.

The film's sets were designed by the art director Willi Herrmann.

== Cast ==
- Grete Reinwald
- Henry Stuart
- Elizza La Porta
- Jules Massaro
- Grit Haid
- Jakob Tiedtke
- Olga Limburg
- Robert Scholz
- Gertrud Arnold
- Harry Frank
- Julietta Brandt
- Victor Colani
- Hugo Döblin
- Maria Forescu
- Stefanie Hantzsch
- Antonie Jaeckel
- Oskar Karlweis
- Hilde Maroff
- Sylvia Torf
- Helen von Münchofen
- Sascha von Wanowska
- Hedwig Wangel
- Geza L. Weiss

== Bibliography ==
- Gerhard Lamprecht. Deutsche Stummfilme: 1927-1931.
