= Marcella Albani =

Italian actress (1899–1959)

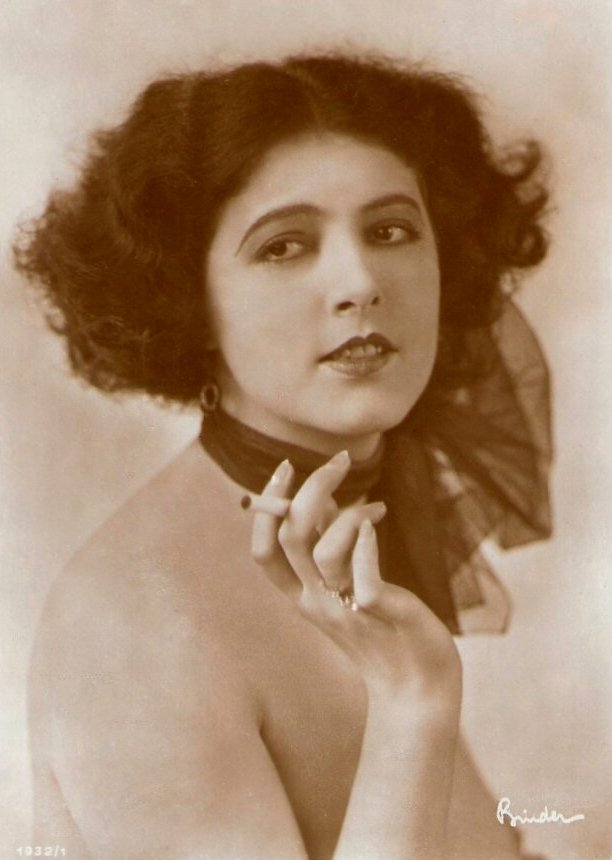
- Born: Ida Fidalma Angela Maranca; 7 December 1899; Albano Laziale, Rome, Kingdom of Italy
- Died: 11 May 1959 (aged 59); Wiesbaden, West Germany
- Occupations: Actress; writer
- Years active: 1919–1936
- Spouse: Mario Franchini (m. 1931)

Marcella Albani (born Ida Fidalma Angela Maranca; 7 December 1899 – 11 May 1959) was an Italian actress and writer. Albani was an idol of European cinema in the 1920s, and appeared in 50 films between 1919 and 1936 in 5 countries.

== Biography ==
Ida Fidalma Angela Maranca was born on 7 December 1899 (some sources say 11 December 1899) to Ezelino Maranca and Adele Maranca (née Masini). She had one sister, Ione Maranca.

Shortly after completing her exams at school, Maranca was discovered by the actor, director, and screenwriter Guido Parisch. Maranca took on the stage name Marcella Albani and she made her film debut in L'amplesso della morte (1919), directed by Parisch. Parisch would go on to direct most of Albani's early filmography.

In 1923, Albani and Parisch traveled to Berlin, and Albani made her German film debut in Im Rausch der Leidenschaft (1923), which she also produced, followed by Frauenschicksal (1923) with Carl Auen, and The Game of Love (1924). Albani quickly became a popular actress in Germany, and her career was based there for the next six years.

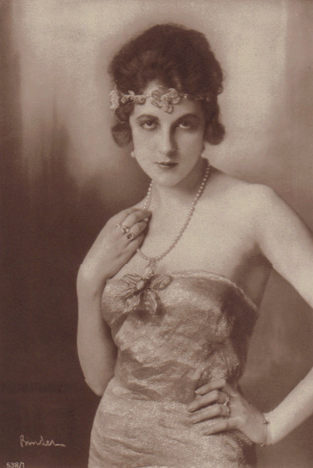
Albani c. 1922

She played a supporting role in Old Mamsell's Secret (1925), which starred Frida Richard, and acted opposite Mady Christians and Bruno Kastner in The Divorcée (1926), based on the operetta Die geschiedene Frau.

In 1926, her creative partnership with Parisch ended, and she began working with directors such as Joe May, Friedrich Zelnik, and Wilhelm Dieterle. Albani starred with Paul Richter in Dagfin (1926), in which she played Lydia, and with Sandra Milovanoff and Werner Krauss in Make Up (1927). Between 1927 and 1929, Albani was at the height of her career, and her popularity expanded to France, Austria, and Czechoslovakia.

She made her French film debut in L'évadée (1929), and in Czechoslovakia, made the drama Sin of a Beautiful Woman (1929), directed by Karel Lamač.

After the silent era ended, Albani's career began to decline, and she returned to Italy, where she starred in Before the Jury (1931). She devoted herself to literature, and wrote several novels, one of which, La città dell'amore (1934), was adapted for the screen, with Albani starring in it in addition to producing it. Her last screen appearance was in the Western Der Kaiser von Kalifornien (1936).

In 1931, Albani married director Mario Franchini. After retiring in 1936, she lived on the Ligurian Coast. Albani died of a brain tumor on 11 May 1959 in Wiesbaden, West Germany.

== Selected filmography ==
- Frauenschicksal (1922)
- Im Rausch der Leidenschaft (1923)
- Guillotine (1924)
- The Game of Love (1924)
- Old Mamsell's Secret (1925)
- Letters Which Never Reached Him (1925)
- The Circus of Life (1926)
- The Divorcée (1926)
- Circle of Lovers (1927)
- The Curse of Vererbung (1927)
- Behind the Altar (1927)
- The Lady in Black (1928)
- The Duty to Remain Silent (1928)
- Secrets of the Orient (1928)
- Prince or Clown (1928)
- Theater (1928)
- Struggle for the Matterhorn (1928)
- Masks (1929)
- Sin of a Beautiful Woman (1929)
- Call at Midnight (1929)
- Devotion (1929)
- Storm of Love (1929)
- Before the Jury (1931)
- Zaganella and the Cavalier (1932)
- Ritorno alla terra (1934)
- Stradivari (1935)
- Stradivarius (1935)
- Der Kaiser von Kalifornien (1936)
