= Reveille: The Great Awakening =

1925 film

- Directed by: Fritz Kaufmann
- Written by: Gerd Briese; Ruth Goetz
- Starring: Werner Krauss; Ruth Weyher; Gerd Briese
- Cinematography: Leopold Kutzleb
- Production company: Export Film-Vertriebs
- Distributed by: Trianon-Film
- Release date: 27 March 1925
- Country: Germany
- Languages: Silent; German intertitles

Reveille: The Great Awakening (German: Reveille, das große Wecken) is a 1925 German silent war film directed by Fritz Kaufmann and starring Werner Krauss, Ruth Weyher and Gerd Briese. It is sometimes confused with the 1924 British film Reveille by George Pearson, but the two films apparently have no links other than their similar title.

The film's sets were designed by Karl Machus.

== Cast ==
- Werner Krauss
- Ruth Weyher
- Gerd Briese
- Albert Steinrück
- Victor Colani
- Fritz Kampers
- Lilly Flohr
- Maria West
- Ernst Pittschau

== Bibliography ==
- Bock, Hans-Michael & Bergfelder, Tim. The Concise CineGraph. Encyclopedia of German Cinema. Berghahn Books, 2009.
