= Behind the Altar =

1927 film

- Directed by: Julius Brandt; William Dieterle
- Written by: William Dieterle
- Produced by: William Dieterle
- Starring: William Dieterle; Marcella Albani; Alfred Gerasch
- Cinematography: Otto Martini; Erich Nitzschmann; Giovanni Vitrotti
- Production company: Charha-Film
- Distributed by: Deutsch-Nordische Film-Union
- Release date: 8 December 1927
- Country: Germany
- Languages: Silent; German intertitles

Behind the Altar or The Secret of Abbe X (German: Das Geheimnis des Abbe X) is a 1927 German silent drama film directed by Julius Brandt and William Dieterle and starring Dieterle, Marcella Albani, and Alfred Gerasch.

The film's sets were designed by the art directors Erich Grave and Ernst Stern.

== Cast ==
- William Dieterle as Der Abbé
- Marcella Albani as Die Marchesa
- Alfred Gerasch as Der Conte
- Jeanne Helbling as Bianca, Zofe der Marchesa
- Kenneth Rive as Der junge Marchese
- Hermann Picha as Beppo, Diener des Conte
- Julius Brandt as Der Majordomus
- Paul Biensfeldt as Der alte Pfarrer
- Raimondo Van Riel as Becelli

== Bibliography ==
- Bock, Hans-Michael; Bergfelder, Tim, eds. (2009). The Concise Cinegraph: Encyclopaedia of German Cinema. New York: Berghahn Books. ISBN 978-1-57181-655-9.
