= Andrée Lafayette =

French actress (1903–1989)

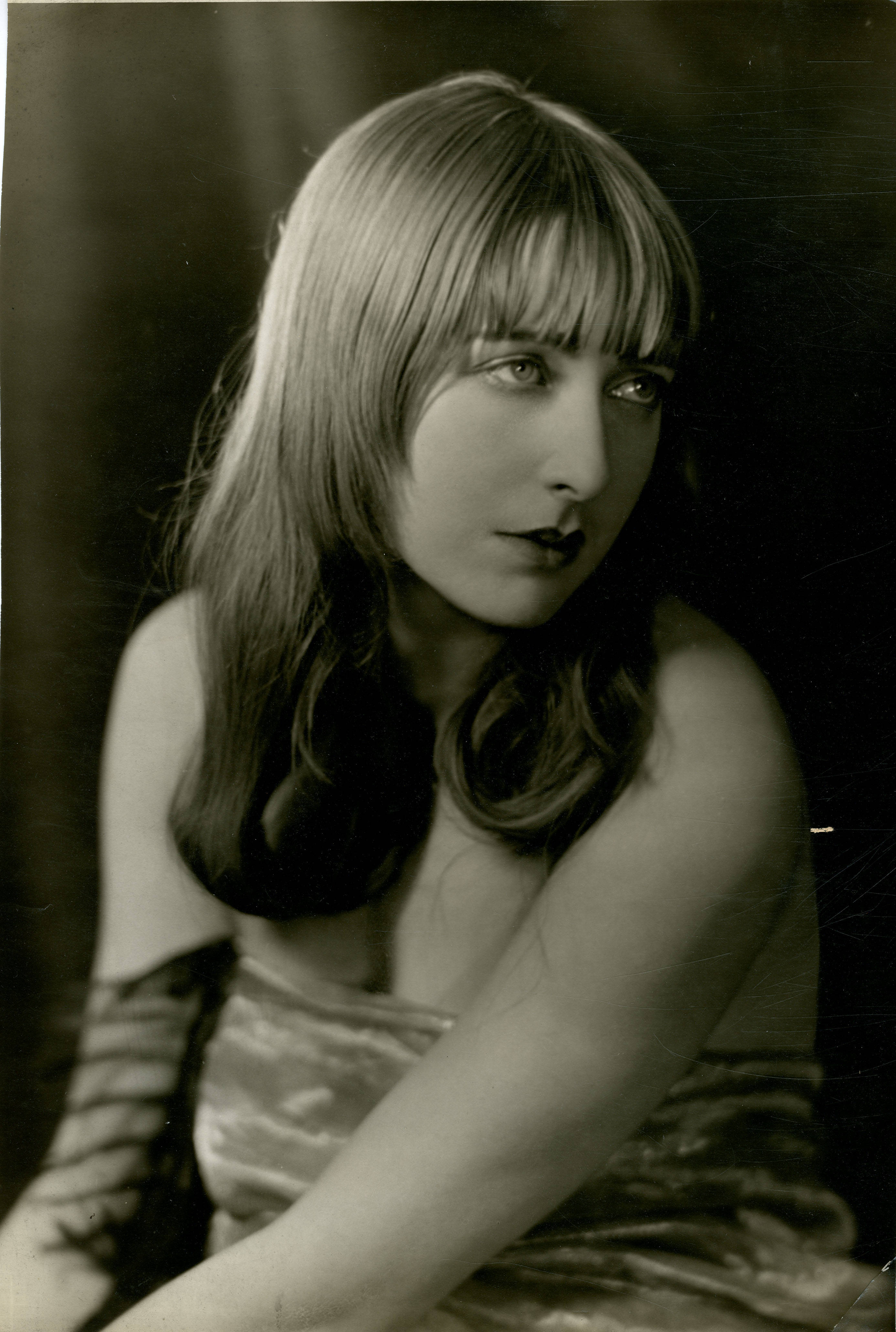
- Andrée Lafayette in 1923
- Born: Andrée Rose Godard; 19 May 1903; Achères, Yvelines, France
- Died: 3 October 1989 (aged 86); Équemauville, Calvados, France
- Other name: Countess Andrée Rose Godard de la Bigne
- Occupation: Actress
- Years active: 1923–1953 (film)
- Spouse: Arthur Max Constant (m. 1923; died 1943)

Andrée Rose Godard (19 May 1903 – 3 October 1989), known by her stage-name as Andrée Lafayette, and also her self-invented title as Countess Andrée de la Bigne, was a French stage and film actress.

== Biography ==
Andrée Rose Godard was born on 19 May 1903 in Achères to Julia Pâquerette Fossey and Paul Jules Auguste Godard. She had two siblings, Paul and Margot. Her mother was the daughter of Émilie Louise Delabigne; Delabigne became an elite French courtesan and demi-mondaine, and was known by her self-invented title, Countess Valtesse de La Bigne.

Film producer and playwright Richard Walton Tully brought Lafayette to the United States to star in the film Trilby (1923), describing her as "one of the most beautiful girls in France" On 17 April 1923, she married American actor Arthur Max Constant.

In the early 1930s, Lafayette met Prince Andrew of Greece and Denmark, who became her lover. He was the father of Prince Philip, husband of Elizabeth II, Queen of the United Kingdom.

Lafayette's husband died in 1943 while piloting an airplane. She continued her career until 1953 in France and the United States, and died in France on 3 October 1989.

== Selected filmography ==
- Trilby (1923)
- Why Get Married? (1924)
- Queen of the Boulevards (1927)
- The Eighteen Year Old (1927)
- The Great Unknown (1927)
- The Hangman (1928)
- Casanova's Legacy (1928)
- The Three Musketeers (1932)
- Fanatisme (1934)
- The Lady of the Camellias (1934)
- The Porter from Maxim's (1953)
