= Trilby (1923 film) =

1923 film by James Young

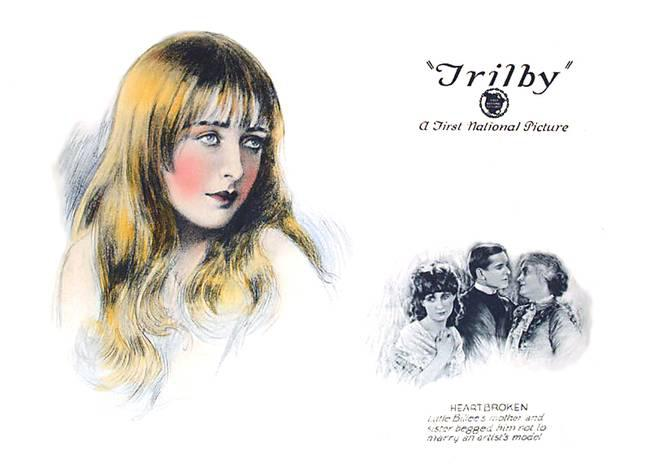
- Lobby card
- Directed by: James Young
- Written by: Richard Walton Tully
- Based on: Trilby by George du Maurier
- Produced by: Richard Walton Tully
- Starring: Andrée Lafayette; Creighton Hale; Arthur Edmund Carewe
- Cinematography: Georges Benoît
- Production company: Richard Walton Tully Productions
- Distributed by: First National Pictures
- Release date: July 29, 1923
- Running time: 80 minutes
- Country: United States
- Language: Silent (English intertitles)

Trilby is a 1923 American silent drama film directed by James Young and starring Andrée Lafayette, Creighton Hale, and Arthur Edmund Carewe. It is an adaptation of the 1894 novel Trilby by George du Maurier about a young woman named Trilby who falls under the power of the domineering mesmerist Svengali.

== Plot ==
A beautiful young model named Trilby falls in love with a young man named Little Billee when they meet in a laundry. A vile mesmerist named Svengali also encounters the girl and becomes obsessed over her. After Little Billee proposes marriage to Trilby, Svengali kidnaps her and uses his hypnotic powers to mesmerize her. He finds that although he can erase her will and make her do anything, he cannot make her love him. Svengali uses his powers to turn Trilby into a talented singer, and tours the capitals of Europe with her as her manager. Svengali dies from a heart attack, and Trilby immediately loses her ability to sing and dies as well shortly thereafter.

== Cast ==
- Andrée Lafayette as Trilby
- Creighton Hale as Little Billee
- Arthur Edmund Carewe as Svengali
- Philo McCullough as Taffy
- Wilfred Lucas as The Laird
- Maurice de Canonge as Zouzou
- Gordon Mullen as Durien
- Martha Franklin as Madame Vinard
- Gilbert Clayton as Reverend Bagot
- Edward Kimball as Impresario
- Francis McDonald as Geko
- Max Constant as Dodor
- Gertrude Olmstead as Miss Bagot
- Evelyn Sherman as Mrs. Bagot
- Rose Dione as Laundress
- Robert DeVilbiss as Jeannot

== Production ==
French actress Andrée Lafayette traveled to Hollywood to make this film (her first major role), then after making a picture in Canada soon after, returned to France where, after appearing in several more films, she more or less retired in the mid-1930s. "Trilby" was filmed earlier in 1915, directed by Maurice Tourneur, but the 1923 version is considered superior by critics. Variety called Andrée Lafayette "the ideal Trilby in face and figure". Interestingly, James Young (director of the 1923 version) had a small role in Tourneur's 1915 production, as it starred his wife Clara Kimball Young in the lead role of Trilby.

Arthur Edmund Carewe had a very successful career as an actor until he died in 1937, appearing in several horror classics such as The Phantom of the Opera (1925) and Mystery in the Wax Museum (1933). Creighton Hale also went on to appear in several silent horror classics as well, including The Cat and the Canary (1927) and Seven Footprints to Satan (1929).

Director Young shot two different endings for the film, one following the novel in which Trilby dies, and one in which she lives (as in the revamped 1915 version by Maurice Tourneur). At the last minute, the producers opted for the version in which she dies, because "that ending was so familiar to movie audiences at the time".

The film was remade as Svengali in Germany in 1927, which starred Paul Wegener in the title role. The first sound film version of Trilby was made in the United States in 1931 (also retitled Svengali), considered by critics to be "the definitive adaptation" today.

== Bibliography ==
- Munden, Kenneth White. The American Film Institute Catalog of Motion Pictures Produced in the United States, Part 1. University of California Press, 1997.
