= The Flames Lie =

1926 film directed by Carl Froelich

- Directed by: Carl Froelich
- Written by: Carl Froelich; Henny Porten; Wilhelm von Kaufmann
- Starring: Hans Adalbert Schlettow; Ruth Weyher; Henny Porten
- Cinematography: Axel Graatkjær
- Edited by: Walter Supper
- Production company: Henny Porten-Froelich-Produktion
- Distributed by: Parufamet
- Release date: 22 October 1926
- Running time: 110 minutes
- Country: Germany
- Languages: Silent; German intertitles

The Flames Lie (German: Die Flammen lügen) is a 1926 German silent drama film directed by Carl Froelich and starring Hans Adalbert Schlettow, Ruth Weyher and Henny Porten. It was shot at the Staaken Studios in Berlin. The film's sets were designed by Franz Schroedter. It was made by UFA and released under the Parufamet agreement.

== Cast ==
- Hans Adalbert Schlettow as Konrad Birkinger
- Ruth Weyher as Doritt Lenee, seine Freundin
- Henny Porten as Gertrud von Gehr
- Paul Bildt as Erwin von Gehr, Gertruds Vater
- Gerd Briese as Hermann von Gehr, Gertruds Bruder
- Grete Mosheim as Anne von Berke
- Ferdinand von Alten as Arken, Birkingers Privatsekretär
- Hubert von Meyerinck as Ein Liebhaber
- Lotte Steinhoff

== Bibliography ==
- Grange, William. Cultural Chronicle of the Weimar Republic. Scarecrow Press, 2008.
