= Master and Mistress =

1928 film

- Directed by: Alfred Theodor Mann
- Written by: Alfred Theodor Mann (novel)
- Starring: Hans Albers; Maly Delschaft; Carl de Vogt
- Cinematography: Willy Großstück; Reimar Kuntze
- Production company: Naxos-Film
- Release date: 7 June 1928
- Country: Germany
- Languages: Silent; German intertitles

Master and Mistress (German: Herr Meister und Frau Meisterin) is a 1928 German silent film directed by Alfred Theodor Mann and starring Hans Albers, Maly Delschaft and Carl de Vogt.

The film's art direction was by Heinrich Richter.

== Cast ==
- Hans Albers as Arthur Burger
- Maly Delschaft as Elly Nagel
- Carl de Vogt as Robert
- Carl Auen as Kunstschmied Wenzel
- Robert Garrison
- Philipp Manning as Fritz Burger
- Albert Paulig
- Eduard von Winterstein
- Ida Wüst as Witwe Frank

== Bibliography ==
- Alfred Krautz. International directory of cinematographers, set- and costume designers in film, Volume 4. Saur, 1984.
