= Old Mamsell's Secret =

1925 film

- Directed by: Paul Merzbach
- Written by: Fanny Carlsen; E. Marlitt (novel); Paul Merzbach
- Starring: Frida Richard; Guido Parish; Marcella Albani
- Cinematography: Frederik Fuglsang
- Music by: Gustav Gold
- Production company: Deutsche Vereins-Film
- Distributed by: Deutsche Fox
- Release date: 27 October 1925
- Country: Germany
- Languages: Silent; German intertitles

Old Mamsell's Secret (German:Das Geheimnis der alten Mamsell) is a 1925 German silent film directed by Paul Merzbach and starring Frida Richard, Guido Parish and Marcella Albani.

The film's art direction was by Andrej Andrejew and Gustav A. Knauer. It was distributed by the German branch of Fox Film.

== Cast ==
- Frida Richard as Dortje van Dekker
- Guido Parish as Vladimir Orlowski
- Marcella Albani as Felicitas van Dekker - van Dekkers Tochter
- Hans Mierendorff as Konsul van Dekker
- Julia Serda as Regina van Dekker
- Harry Halm as Harry
- Anton Pointner as Adrian
- Alexandra Sorina as Tora Brink
- Max Winter as Hendrik - Diener beim Konsul
- Charly Berger as Chauffeur
- Hermann Picha as Schuster
- Gerhard Ritterband as Schusterjunge
- Frederic Zelnik

== Bibliography ==
- Jill Nelmes & Jule Selbo. Women Screenwriters: An International Guide. Palgrave Macmillan, 2015.
