= The Mexican (1918 film) =

- Directed by: Carl Heinz Wolff
- Written by: Oskar Schubert-Stevens
- Starring: Ferdinand Bonn; Conrad Veidt
- Production company: Kowo-Gesellschaft für Filmfabrikation
- Release date: 1918
- Country: Germany
- Languages: Silent; German intertitles

The Mexican (German: Die Mexikanerin) is a 1918 German silent film directed by Carl Heinz Wolff and starring Ferdinand Bonn and Conrad Veidt. It is a lost film.

== Cast ==
- Ferdinand Bonn
- Conrad Veidt
- Kurt Brenkendorf
- Magda Elgen
- Kurt Katch

== Bibliography ==
- Bock, Hans-Michael & Bergfelder, Tim. The Concise CineGraph. Encyclopedia of German Cinema. Berghahn Books, 2009.
