= A Knight in London =

1928 film

- German film poster
- German: Eine Nacht in London
- Directed by: Lupu Pick
- Written by: Charles Lincoln; Georg C. Klaren; Herbert Juttke
- Produced by: Jerome Jackson
- Starring: Lilian Harvey; Ivy Duke; Robin Irvine; Bernard Nedell
- Cinematography: Robert Baberske; Karl Freund
- Edited by: Michael Powell
- Music by: Eduard Künneke
- Production company: Blattner Film
- Distributed by: Warner Brothers
- Release dates: 17 December 1928 (Germany); March 1929 (UK)
- Running time: 6,750 feet
- Countries: Germany; United Kingdom
- Languages: Silent Version; Sound Version (Synchronized); German/English Intertitles

A Knight in London (German: Eine Nacht in London) is a 1928 British-German silent drama film directed by Lupu Pick and starring Lilian Harvey, Ivy Duke and Robin Irvine. A sound version was released in 1930. While the sound version has no audible dialog, it features a synchronized musical score with sound effects. The film was one of a significant number of co-productions between the two countries in the late 1920s. The film's direction and the cinematography by Karl Freund were widely praised.

== Cast ==
- Lilian Harvey as Aline Morland
- Ivy Duke as Lady Morland
- Robin Irvine as Harry Erskine
- Bernard Nedell as Prince Zalnoff
- Robert English as Mr. McComber
- Kenneth Rive as Boy
- Zena Dare
- Harry Nestor
