= The Bordellos of Algiers =

1927 film by Wolfgang Hoffmann-Harnisch

- Directed by: Wolfgang Hoffmann-Harnisch
- Written by: Robert Reinert
- Starring: Maria Jacobini; Camilla Horn; Warwick Ward
- Cinematography: Carl Hoffmann
- Music by: Artur Guttmann
- Production company: UFA
- Distributed by: Parufamet
- Release date: 10 May 1927
- Running time: 93 minutes
- Country: Germany
- Languages: Silent; German intertitles

The Bordellos of Algiers (German: Die Frauengasse von Algier) is a 1927 German silent drama film directed by Wolfgang Hoffmann-Harnisch and starring Maria Jacobini, Camilla Horn and Warwick Ward. The film was shot on location in North Africa. The film's sets were designed by the art directors Hans Jacoby and Bruno Krauskopf. It premiered at the UFA-Palast am Zoo in Berlin.

== Cast ==
- Maria Jacobini as Frau Brison / Musa Samarra
- Camilla Horn as Adrienne Brisson
- Warwick Ward as Nicola Molescu
- Jean Bradin as Prosecutor René Cadillac
- Elizza La Porta as Mira
- Franz Schafheitlin
- Hans Adalbert Schlettow as Miras Bruder
- Paul Otto as Oberst Guignard
- Karl Etlinger as Notar Bernasquez
- Georg John as Portier
- Frigga Braut as 1. Wärterin
- Maria Forescu as 2. Wärterin
- Lydia Potechina as Driennes Gesellschafterin
- Egon Erwin Kisch as Bettler

== Bibliography ==
- Segel, Harold B. (1997). Egon Erwin Kisch, the Raging Reporter: A Bio-anthology. West Lafayette, IN: Purdue University Press. ISBN 978-1-55753-100-1.
