= Maly Delschaft =

German actress (1898–1995)

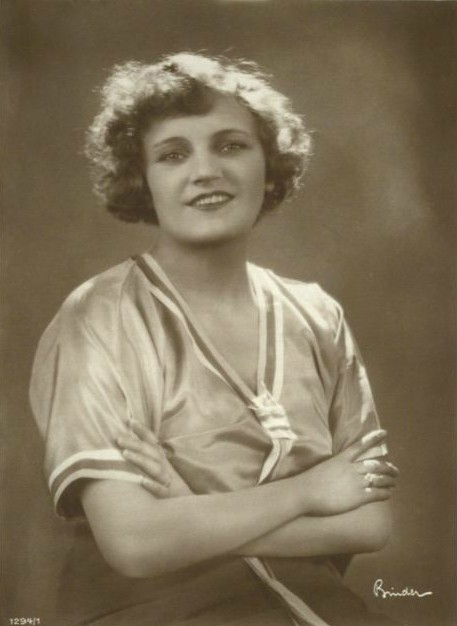
- Born: Martha Amalia Delschaft; 4 December 1898; Hamburg, German Empire
- Died: 20 August 1995 (aged 96); Berlin, Germany
- Other name: Amalie Köster-Delschaft
- Occupations: Film actress Stage actress
- Years active: 1921–1961

Martha Amalia "Maly" Delschaft (4 December 1898 – 20 August 1995) was a German stage and film actress. After beginning in theatre, Delschaft switched to silent films. She appeared in mainly supporting roles during the Weimar and Nazi eras. After the Second World War she worked in East Germany for the state-controlled studio DEFA.

== Selected filmography ==
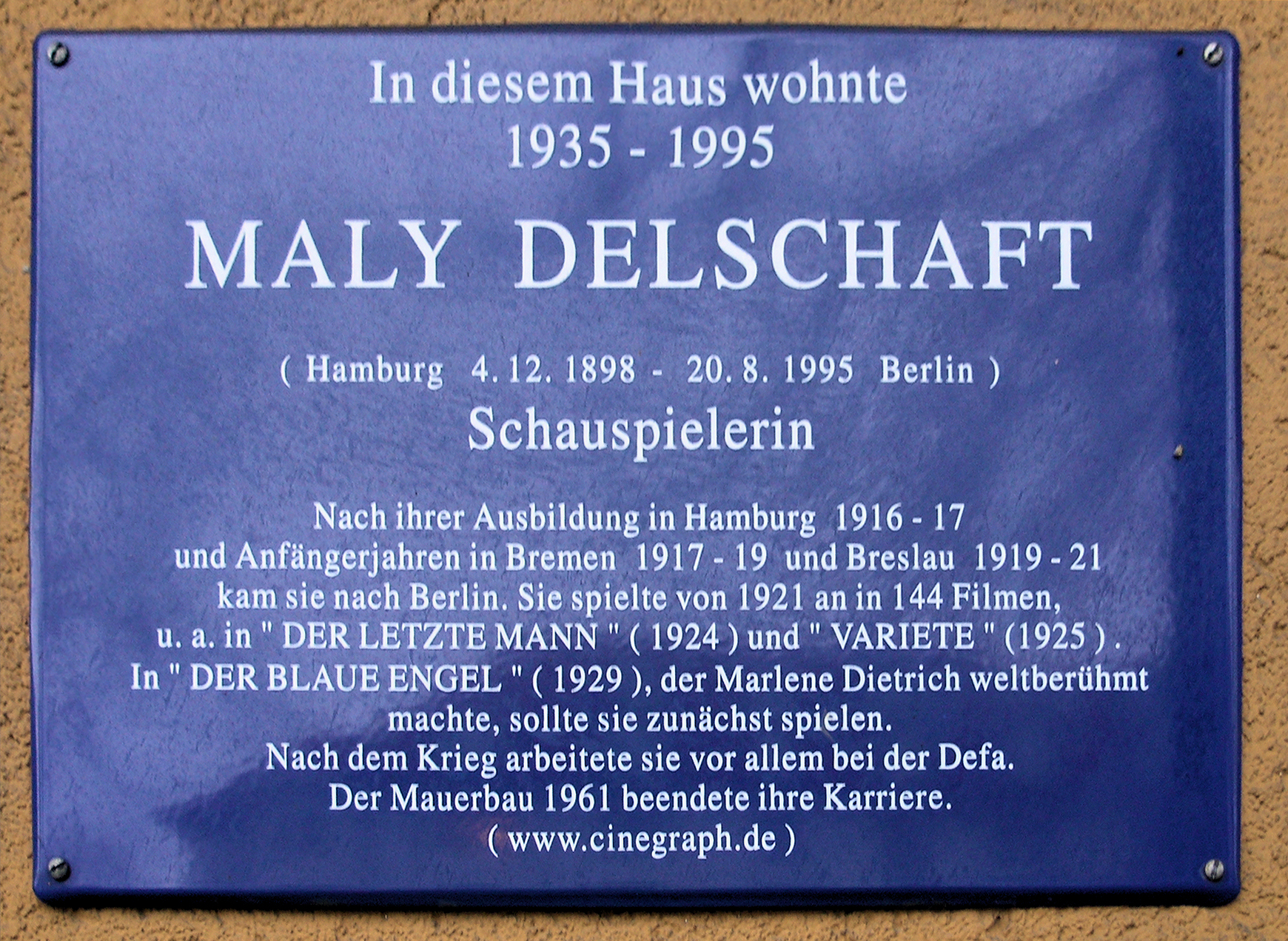
A plaque in Berlin commemorating Delschaft.

- Danton (1921)
- The Lady and Her Hairdresser (1922)
- Dudu, a Human Destiny (1924)
- The Last Laugh (1924)
- When I Came Back (1925)
- Cock of the Roost (1925)
- Variety (1925)
- The Man on the Comet (1925)
- The Iron Bride (1925)
- Three Waiting Maids (1925)
- Rags and Silk (1925)
- Den of Iniquity (1925)
- If You Have an Aunt (1925)
- Anne-Liese of Dessau (1925)
- When I Came Back (1926)
- The Man Without Sleep (1926)
- The Last Horse Carriage in Berlin (1926)
- The White Horse Inn (1926)
- The Woman's Crusade (1926)
- The Ones Down There (1926)
- Hunted People (1926)
- Linden Lady on the Rhine (1927)
- The Curse of Vererbung (1927)
- The Right to Live (1927)
- Excluded from the Public (1927)
- Caught in Berlin's Underworld (1927)
- The Ways of Love Are Strange (1927)
- Casanova's Legacy (1928)
- Master and Mistress (1928)
- The Fate of the House of Habsburg (1928)
- Sixteen Daughters and No Father (1928)
- The Right of the Unborn (1929)
- Eros in Chains (1929)
- The Chaste Coquette (1929)
- Andreas Hofer (1929)
- Echo of a Dream (1930)
- Duty Is Duty (1931)
- My Wife, the Impostor (1931)
- Without Meyer, No Celebration is Complete (1931)
- William Tell (1934)
- The Private Life of Louis XIV (1935)
- Don't Lose Heart, Suzanne! (1935)
- Paradies der Junggesellen (1939)
- Bachelor's Paradise (1939)
- With the Eyes of a Woman (1942)
- The Golden Spider (1943)
- The Big Number (1943)
- Blum Affair (1948)
- Familie Benthin (1950)
- Der Kahn der fröhlichen Leute (1950)
- The Sonnenbrucks (1951)
- Anna Susanna (1953)
- Before God and Man (1955)
- Alibi (1955)
- I Was an Ugly Girl (1955)
- Thomas Müntzer (1956)
- Widower with Five Daughters (1957)
- Man in the River (1958)
- The Csardas King (1958)
- My Wife Makes Music (1958)
- Emilia Galotti (1958)
- No Trouble with Cleopatra (1960)
- Two Among Millions (1961)

== Bibliography ==
- Prawer, S.S. Between Two Worlds: The Jewish Presence in German and Austrian Film, 1910-1933. Berghahn Books, 2005.
- St. Pierre, Paul Matthew. E.A. Dupont and His Contribution to British Film. Fairleigh Dickinson Univ Press, 2010.
