= Karriere in Paris =

1952 film

- Directed by: Hans-Georg Rudolph; Georg C. Klaren
- Release date: 1952
- Country: East Germany
- Language: German

Karriere in Paris is a 1952 East German film. It is based on the novel Père Goriot by Honoré de Balzac.
