= The Last Horse Carriage in Berlin =

1926 film directed by Carl Boese

- Directed by: Carl Boese
- Written by: Leo Heller; Rudolf Strauß
- Produced by: Lupu Pick
- Starring: Lupu Pick; Hedwig Wangel; Maly Delschaft; Albert Florath
- Cinematography: Toni Frenguelli
- Music by: Giuseppe Becce
- Production company: Rex-Film
- Distributed by: UFA
- Release date: 18 March 1926
- Running time: 75 minutes
- Country: Germany
- Languages: Silent; German intertitles

The Last Horse Carriage in Berlin (German: Die letzte Droschke von Berlin) is a 1926 German silent comedy drama film directed by Carl Boese and starring Lupu Pick, Hedwig Wangel, and Maly Delschaft. The film's art direction was by Franz Schroedter. The film premiered in Berlin on 18 March 1926.

== Synopsis ==
A taxi driver in Berlin refuses to give up his horse and switch to motor transport.

== Cast ==
- Lupu Pick as Gottlieb Lüdecke
- Hedwig Wangel as Auguste Lüdecke
- Maly Delschaft as Margot Lüdecke
- Hans Adalbert Schlettow as Erich Flottmann
- Albert Florath as Wilhelm Lemke
- Evi Eva as Anna Lemke
- Werner Pittschau as Karl Lüdecke
- Hugo Fischer-Köppe as Oskar Hempel
- Karl Falkenberg as Strolch

== Bibliography ==
- Grange, William. Cultural Chronicle of the Weimar Republic. Scarecrow Press, 2008.
