= Devotion (1929 film) =

1929 film

- Directed by: Guido Brignone
- Written by: Guido Brignone; Herbert Juttke; Georg C. Klaren
- Starring: Marcella Albani; Hans Melzer; Hans Adalbert Schlettow
- Cinematography: Max Nekut; Hans Theyer
- Production companies: Listo Film; Messtro-Film
- Distributed by: Messtro-Film
- Release date: 27 July 1929 (Vienna)
- Countries: Austria; Germany
- Languages: Silent; German intertitles

Devotion (German: Hingabe) is a 1929 Austrian-German silent drama film directed by Guido Brignone and starring Marcella Albani, Hans Melzer, and Hans Adalbert Schlettow.

The film's sets were designed by Artur Berger and Emil Stepanek.

== Cast ==
- Marcella Albani as Die Frau
- Hans Melzer as Der Vater
- Hans Adalbert Schlettow as Der Mann
- Clementine Plessner as Die Mutter
- Stewart Rome as Der Augenarzt
- Mizzi Griebl as Die Haushälterin
- Carlo Fontana

== Bibliography ==
- Gandert, Gero (1993). Der Film der Weimarer Republik: 1929. Berlin: Walter de Gruyter. ISBN 978-3-11-011183-5.
