= Casanova's Legacy =

1928 film directed by Manfred Noa

- Directed by: Manfred Noa
- Written by: Herbert Juttke; Georg C. Klaren; Margarete-Maria Langen
- Produced by: Manfred Noa
- Starring: Andrée Lafayette; Maly Delschaft; Elizza La Porta
- Cinematography: Willy Goldberger
- Music by: Willy Schmidt-Gentner
- Production company: Noa-Film
- Distributed by: Bavaria Film
- Release date: 15 May 1928
- Running time: 98 minutes
- Country: Germany
- Languages: Silent; German intertitles

Casanova's Legacy (German: Casanovas Erbe) is a 1928 German silent drama film directed by Manfred Noa and starring Andrée Lafayette, Maly Delschaft and Elizza La Porta. The film's sets were designed by the art director Alexander Ferenczy.

== Cast ==
- Andrée Lafayette
- Maly Delschaft
- Elizza La Porta
- Yvette Darnys]
- Harry Hardt
- John Loder
- Kurt Gerron
- Louis Ralph
- Olga Belajeff

== Bibliography ==
- Bock, Hans-Michael & Bergfelder, Tim. The Concise CineGraph. Encyclopedia of German Cinema. Berghahn Books, 2009.
