= Column X =

1929 film

- Directed by: Reinhold Schünzel
- Written by: Herbert Juttke; Georg C. Klaren
- Produced by: Reinhold Schünzel
- Starring: Reinhold Schünzel; Ernst Stahl-Nachbaur; Grete Reinwald; Olga Engl
- Cinematography: Willy Goldberger
- Music by: Werner Schmidt-Boelcke
- Production company: Reinhold Schünzel Film
- Distributed by: Süd-Film
- Release date: 7 August 1929
- Country: Germany
- Languages: Silent; German intertitles

Column X (German: Kolonne X) is a 1929 German silent crime film directed by Reinhold Schünzel and starring Schünzel, Ernst Stahl-Nachbaur and Grete Reinwald. The film attempted to imitate the style of American crime films, switched to a German setting. It was shot at the Tempelhof Studios in Berlin and premiered at the city's Marmorhaus cinema.

== Cast ==
- Reinhold Schünzel as Robert Sandt, Führer der Kolonne X
- Ernst Stahl-Nachbaur as Kriminalkommissar Weigert
- Grete Reinwald as Irene Mahler
- Olga Engl as Tant Eulalia
- Oskar Sima
- Arthur Duarte
- Gerhard Ritterband as Mitglied der Kolonne X
- Otto Wallburg

== Bibliography ==
- Prawer, Siegbert Salomon (2005). Between Two Worlds: The Jewish Presence in German and Austrian Film, 1910–1933. Berghahn Books. ISBN 978-1-84545-074-8.
