= Elizza La Porta =

Romanian actress

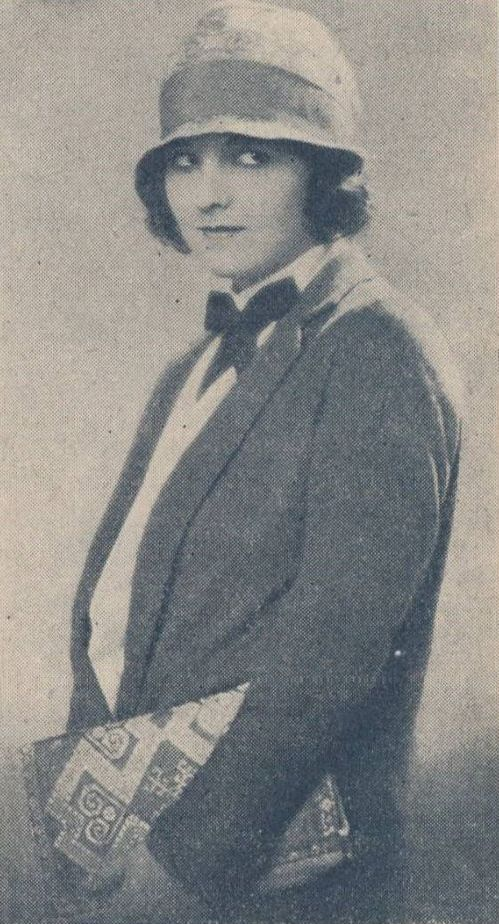
- Born: Eliza Streinu; 1 March 1902; Craiova, Kingdom of Romania
- Died: 15 November 1997 (aged 95); Los Angeles, United States
- Occupation: Actress
- Years active: 1926-1930 (Film)

Elizza La Porta (born Eliza Streinu; 1 March 1902 – 15 November 1997) was a Romanian-born film actress. La Porta was born in Craiova into a Jewish family. She appeared in a number of German films during the silent film era. She retired from acting at the onset of the sound film. She later emigrated to the United States where she died in Los Angeles in 1997, aged 95.

== Selected filmography ==
- The Student of Prague (1926)
- Light Cavalry (1927)
- The Bordellos of Algiers (1927)
- The Sporck Battalion (1927)
- The Trial of Donald Westhof (1927)
- The Vice of Humanity (1927)
- The Right to Live (1927)
- Casanova's Legacy (1928)
- Give Me Life (1928)
- Anastasia, the False Czar's Daughter (1928)
- Robert and Bertram (1928)
- The Right of the Unborn (1929)

== Bibliography ==
- Goble, Alan. The Complete Index to Literary Sources in Film. Walter de Gruyter, 1999.
