= James Bauer =

German film director (1884–1940)

- Born: 1884; Germany
- Died: 1940 (aged 55–56); Argentina
- Occupation: Film director
- Years active: 1920s–1940
- Known for: Argentine Golden Age cinema

James Bauer (1884–1940) was a German film director. Following the Nazi takeover of power in 1933, he emigrated first to Spain and later to Argentina, where he directed several films of the Golden Age of Argentine cinema until his death in 1940.

== Biography ==
Bauer was born into a Jewish merchant family in Hamburg. His father, Moses "Moritz" Ephraim, dealt in sewing machine parts. Bauer received his theatrical training under Cord Hachmann and made his debut as a stage actor in Hagen in 1902. He adopted "James Bauer" as his stage name as a tribute to the maiden name of his mother, Jeanette Bauer. In 1905, he worked as a theater director for the first time in Nysa. In 1908, he became the head of the Volks-Schauspielhaus in Hamburg and later served as director of the Hamburger Neues Theater. In 1912, he visited Berlin with his touring production Napoleon und seine Frauen. While he was on a guest performance tour in German South West Africa in 1914, World War I broke out. After a year of active service in the field, Bauer was taken prisoner of war and was unable to return from Africa to Berlin until 1919. In 1920, he began his career as a film director in Berlin, frequently collaborating with the actor and producer Hans Mierendorff. Between 1924 and 1925, he served as managing director of Lucifer-Film Co. m.b.H., succeeding Mierendorff. Subsequently, he directed for various production companies. In 1928, he founded his own film company, Ines Internationale Spielfilm GmbH, followed by Renaissance Film GmbH in 1931. Following the Nazi seizure of power in 1933, Bauer emigrated to Spain, where he directed the unsuccessful police film parody No me mates. After the outbreak of the Spanish Civil War in 1936, he emigrated to Argentina. There, he was able to continue his directing career until 1940. He died in Buenos Aires in 1947.

== Personal life ==
James Bauer was married three times: from 1909 until their divorce in 1920 to Hedwig Japhet; from 1921 until their divorce in 1928 to the actress Dorothea von Maltzan; and finally from 1928 until his death to Edith Lilge. His son, Marcel Ephraim, was born in 1928 from his last marriage.

== Selected filmography ==
- The Black Star (1922)
- The Sleeping Volcano (1922)
- Der Mitternachtszug (1923)
- Op Hoop van Zegen (1924)
- Anne-Liese of Dessau (1925)
- Walpurgisnacht (1927)
- Did You Fall in Love Along the Beautiful Rhine? (1927)
- The Foreign Legionnaire (1928)
- The Girl from the Provinces (1929)
- Incest (1929)
- The Third Confession (1929)
- Night Convoy (1932)
- The Escape to Nice (1932)
- Paraguay, tierra de promisión (1937)
- Cantando llegó el amor (1938)
- El misterio de la dama gris (1939)
- Explosivo 008 (1940)

== Bibliography ==
- Bergfelder, Tim & Bock, Hans-Michael. The Concise Cinegraph: Encyclopedia of German. Berghahn Books, 2009.
- Prawer, S.S. Between Two Worlds: The Jewish Presence in German and Austrian Film, 1910–1933. Berghahn Books, 2007.
