= The Student of Prague (painting) =

1983 painting by Julian Schnabel

- Artist: Julian Schnabel
- Year: 1983
- Medium: Oil, plates, horns, and Bondo on wood
- Dimensions: 296.2 × 555 cm (9 ft 8 3/4 in × 18 ft 2 3/4 in)
- Location: Solomon R. Guggenheim Museum, New York

The Student of Prague is an oil, plates, horns and Bondo on wood painting by Julian Schnabel created in 1983. This is one of his most famous "plate paintings", currently at the Solomon R. Guggenheim Museum, in New York. The painting comprises six panels and has the dimensions of 296.2 by 555 cm.

== History and analysis ==
Schnabel was one of the painters who reacted against the styles of minimalism and conceptualism, and became a leading name of neo-expressionism, in the United States and abroad, in the early 1980s. He was inspired for his "plate paintings" by a visit to Antoni Gaudí's Park Güell in Barcelona, and by the proportions of his closet wall in his Spanish hotel room.

This painting seems to have drawn inspiration from Christian art and references. Several crucifixes are presented among a large quantity of broken china vessels, in a structure that seems to evoque religious triptych altarpieces, from which a lone, ghost-like figure emerges. Some art historians have related the monumentality of the work to the Baroque art. Katherine Brisson states that "Despite these religious overtones and the work's flamboyant scale and sense of theatre, there is no suggestion of sublime transportation or spiritual succor. Rather, the topography of jagged fragments, eroding the harmony of the traditional two-dimensional picture plane, offers a troubling vision of a chaotic and shattered world (...)".
