= Ruth Weyher =

German actress

- Born: 28 May 1901; Neumark in Westpreußen German Empire (now Nowe Miasto Lubawskie, Poland)
- Died: 27 January 1983 (aged 81); Munich, Germany
- Occupation: Actress
- Years active: 1920–1930

Ruth Weyher (28 May 1901 – 27 January 1983) was a German film actress of the silent era. She appeared in 60 films between 1920 and 1930. She starred in the 1926 film Secrets of a Soul, which was directed by Georg Wilhelm Pabst.

== Selected filmography ==
- A Dying Nation (1922)
- Warning Shadows (1923)
- Adam and Eve (1923)
- The Ancient Law (1923)
- The Fake Emir (1924)
- A Dangerous Game (1924)
- Comedy of the Heart (1924)
- Darling of the King (1924)
- Wood Love (1925)
- The Fire Dancer (1925)
- Reveille: The Great Awakening (1925)
- Chaste Susanne (1926)
- Secrets of a Soul (1926)
- The Flames Lie (1926)
- The Trumpets are Blowing (1926)
- Lives in Danger (1926)
- Marriage Announcement (1926)
- The Woman in the Cupboard (1927)
- The Impostor (1927)
- Klettermaxe (1927)
- Parisiennes (1928)
- Milak, the Greenland Hunter (1928)
- Father and Son (1929)
- What's Wrong with Nanette? (1929)
- Bobby, the Petrol Boy (1929)
