= Hans Adalbert Schlettow =

German actor (1888–1945)

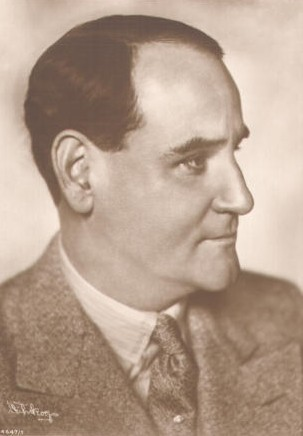
- Hans Adalbert Schlettow
- Born: 11 June 1888; Frankfurt, German Empire
- Died: 30 April 1945 (aged 56); Berlin, Germany
- Cause of death: Air raid
- Other names: Hans Adelbert Droescher von Schlettow
- Years active: 1917–1945

Hans Adalbert Schlettow (11 June 1888 – 30 April 1945) was a German film actor. Schlettow appeared in around a hundred and sixty films during his career, the majority during the silent era. Among his best-known film roles was Hagen von Tronje in Fritz Lang's film classic Die Nibelungen (1924). In 1929 he starred in the British director Anthony Asquith's film A Cottage on Dartmoor.

He was a member of the Militant League for German Culture and the National Socialist Factory Cell Organization. Schlettow died in the Battle of Berlin on the same day Adolf Hitler committed suicide.

== Selected filmography ==
- Und wenn ich lieb' nimm dich in acht...! (1917)
- Der breite Weg (1917)
- Die Gespensterstunde (1917)
- Klosterfriede (1917)
- When the Heart Burns with Hate (1917)
- Vier Finger (1919)
- The White Roses of Ravensberg (1919) as Count Ludwig Erlenstein
- Hiob (1919)
- Countess Doddy (1919)
- Dias Geheimnis der alten Truhe
- Algol (1920) as Peter Hell
- The Love of a Thief (1920) as Bandit Carlo
- Dancer of Death (1920)
- Mary Tudor (1920) as Fabiano Fabiani
- The Women of Gnadenstein (1921) as Fred Hagen
- The Golden Plague (1921) as Dr. Jonas Fjeld
- The White Death (1921) as the groom
- Don Juan (1922) as Don Juan
- The Circle of Death (1922) as Konstantin Chrenow
- On the Red Cliff (1922) as Geert Rantsau
- The Shadows of That Night (1922) as George Green
- The Love Nest (1922)
- Dr. Mabuse the Gambler (1922) as Georg the Chauffeur
- What Belongs to Darkness (1922) as Prisoner
- Die Nibelungen (1924) as Hagen of Tronje
- Malva (1924) as Tadzio
- Op Hoop van Zegen (1924) as Geert
- In the Name of the Kaisers (1925) as Lieutenant Boris
- If Only It Weren't Love (1925)
- Frisian Blood (1925) as Klaus Detlefsen
- Ship in Distress (1925) as Pieter Hansen
- The Last Horse Carriage in Berlin (1926) as Erich Flottmann
- The Flames Lie (1926) as Konrad Birkinger
- Lace (1926) as the police commissioner
- His Toughest Case (1926) as Steppke/Count Strachowsky
- German Hearts on the German Rhine (1926)
- The Owl (1927)
- My Heidelberg, I Can Not Forget You (1927) as Fritz Hansen
- The Last Waltz (1927) as Prince Alexis
- Queen Louise (1927) as Prince Louis Ferdinand of Prussia
- The Bordellos of Algiers (1927) as Mira's brother
- Klettermaxe (1927)
- Aftermath (1927) as the milice leader
- The Woman with the World Record (1927) as Tom Wobber the manager
- Thérèse Raquin (1928) as Laurent LeClaire
- Volga Volga (1928) as Stenka Rasin
- Song (1928) as Laurent LeClaire
- Guilty (1928) as Brothel-keeper Peter Cornelius
- When the Mother and the Daughter (1928)
- A Cottage on Dartmoor (1929) as Harry
- Devotion (1929) as the man
- The Right of the Unborn (1929) as Rolf Stürmer
- Prisoner Number Seven (1929) as Jenõ
- The Immortal Vagabond (1930) as Franz Lechner
- The Great Longing (1930) as himself
- It Happens Every Day (1930)
- A Girl from the Reeperbahn (1930) as Uwe Bull
- Troika (1930) as Boris
- A Woman Branded (1931) as Administrator Bodde
- The Schlemihl (1931) as Jack Brillant
- The Mad Bomberg (1932) as Baron Giesbert von Bomberg
- Sacred Waters (1932) as Sepp Blattrer
- The Naked Truth (1932)
- Chauffeur Antoinette (1932) as William P. Harrison
- Marshal Forwards (1932) as Cavalry Master von Oppen
- Secret of the Blue Room (1932) as Marine Officer Axel Brinck
- The Page from the Dalmasse Hotel (1933) as Count Tarvagna
- Refugees (1933) as the Siberian
- The Roberts Case (1933) as Reimann
- The Hunter from Kurpfalz (1933) as Baron Axel von Hollperg, Gutsherr
- The Hymn of Leuthen (1933) as Duke Moritz of Dessau
- Hubertus Castle (1934) as Schipper
- A Woman With Power of Attorney (1934) as Veidt
- At the End of the World (1934) as Le Bucheron
- Financial Opportunists (1934), as Dr. Lehmann
- You Are Adorable, Rosmarie (1934) as Sepp
- Holiday From Myself (1934) as Barthel
- The Private Life of Louis XIV (1935) as the commander of French troops in Heidelberg
- Regine (1935) as Robert
- Hundred Days (1935) as Davout
- The Schimeck Family (1935) as Franz Baumann
- Don't Lose Heart, Suzanne! (1935) as the detective
- The Haunted Castle (1936) as Kriminalassistent Bornemann
- The Empress's Favourite (1936) as Baron Axhausen
- Stjenka Rasin (1936) as Stjenka Rasin
- The Hunter of Fall (1936) as Huisen Blasi
- Yvette (1938) as Prince Kravalow
- Nights in Andalusia (1938) as Sergeant Garcia
- Women for Golden Hill (1938) as Thomas Trench
- Anton the Last (1939) as Franz Lugauer
- Stars of Variety (1939) as Tom
- Congo Express (1939) as André
- Wibbel the Tailor (1939) as Heubes
- Wunschkonzert (1940) as Kramer
- The Vulture Wally (1940) as Leander Rosenbauer
- Between Hamburg and Haiti (1940)
- Left of the Isar, Right of the Spree (1940) as Baron Wickinger
- Ohm Krüger (1941) as Commandant de Wett
- Much Ado About Nixi (1942) as the gendarm
- The Big Number (1943) as Basto-Bastelmeyer
- My Summer Companion (1943) as Kutscher Prüschke
- Melusine (1944) as Keller the chauffeur
- Why Are You Lying, Elisabeth? (1944) as Ernst Stadinger

== Bibliography ==
- Hardt, Ursula. From Caligari to California: Erich Pommer's Life in the International Film Wars. Berghahn Books, 1996.
- Ernst Klee. Das Kulturlexikon zum Dritten Reich. Wer war was vor und nach 1945. S. Fischer, Frankfurt am Main 2007, ISBN 978-3-10-039326-5, p. 626.
- Ryall, Tom. Anthony Asquith. Manchester University Press, 2005.
