= Adolf Trotz =

German film director

Adolf Trotz (September 6, 1895 – after 1937) was a German film director. He was known for his films in the Mittelfilme (mid-budget) genre.

== Early life ==
Trotz was born in Janow in what is now Poland in Silesia. He originally studied pharmacy and philosophy, but began a career in film after the first World War.

== Career ==
Trotz's 1932 film Rasputin, Demon with Women was certified as "artistically valuable"; however, in 1933, Joseph Goebbels banned the film throughout Germany and ordered all prints and advertising materials to be destroyed. Trotz smuggled both the original pictorial and soundtrack negatives to a farmhouse in Austria. At one point in 1933, he was part of the wave of German émigrés who fled to Paris. In 1936, Goebbels banned his 1933 film Ways to a Good Marriage, which depicted the path to happiness as advice based on the sexology research done by Magnus Hirschfeld, and Trotz fled to Spain in 1936. He continued producing films there until the outbreak of the Spanish Civil War.

After Spain, Trotz moved to Italy in November 1936. He died in Italy shortly before the outbreak of World War II.

== Personal life ==
In 1926, Trotz married screenwriter and editor Ruth Schweriner. They remained married until his death.

== Selected filmography ==
- Gold and Luck (1923)
- The Curse of Vererbung (1927)
- Sixteen Daughters and No Father (1928)
- The Woman in the Advocate's Gown (1929)
- Tragedy of Youth (1929)
- Somnambul (1929)
- The Right of the Unborn (1929)
- Karriere (1930)
- It Happens Every Day (1930)
- A Storm Over Zakopane (1931)
- Shooting Festival in Schilda (1931)
- Elisabeth of Austria (1931)
- Rasputin, Demon with Women (1932)
- Tatras Zauber (1933)
- Ways to a Good Marriage (1933)
