= Sex in Chains =

1928 film directed by William Dieterle

- DVD cover
- Directed by: William Dieterle
- Written by: Herbert Juttke; Georg C. Klaren
- Produced by: Leo Meyer
- Starring: William Dieterle; Gunnar Tolnæs; Mary Johnson; Paul Henckels; Hans Heinrich von Twardowski
- Cinematography: Robert Lach
- Production company: Essem-Film
- Distributed by: Vereinigte Star-Film; Nero Film (worldwide)
- Release date: 24 October 1928
- Running time: 107 minutes
- Country: Weimar Republic
- Languages: silent film German intertitles

Sex in Chains (German: Geschlecht in Fesseln – Die Sexualnot der Strafgefangenen) is a 1928 silent film directed by William Dieterle. It was one of the few films from Weimar Germany dealing with homosexuality.

== Plot ==
The film opens with Franz Sommer (Dieterle) and his newlywed wife, Helene (Mary Johnson). They are going through hard times, and Sommer is without steady employment, partly due to his honest-to-a-fault nature. Helene takes a job selling cigars and cigarettes at a restaurant. When a patron makes advances on Helene and ignores Sommer's warning to leave her alone, Sommer pushes him away. He falls and hits his head, dying some days later. Sommer is arrested and sentenced to three years in prison.

Sommer is kept in a large cell with four other people, one of whom, Steinau (Gunnar Tolnæs), is soon acquitted and promises Sommer to help his wife while he is incarcerated. This he does by giving her a better job at his business and offering her his friendship while they both work to get Sommer out.

For much of the remainder of the film, the men's sexual frustration from being separated from women is the focus, with scenes such as making nude sculptures from breadcrumbs and water and fighting for a woman's handkerchief smuggled in during visitation. At the same time, there is a strong homoerotic undercurrent throughout, though only hinted at.

The fifth act brings changes to both Helene and Sommer's stories. Helene, delirious from Sommer's absence, goes to Steinau one night after madly trying to gain entrance to the prison, and sleeps with him. Meanwhile, Sommer's relationship with fellow inmate Alfred Marquis (Hans Heinrich von Twardowski) begins to move from subtext to foreground.

At the prison church service, Sommer and Marquis sit next to each other, and as the preacher tells them to "Yield not to temptation", Marquis is writing “Franz and Alfred” in the cover of his Bible. He shows it to Sommer, who does not respond. That night, Sommer, seeing Marquis completely absorbed in thought, asks him what he is thinking about. Marquis asks if his nonresponse means he hates him and holds out his hand. Sommer takes it, and begins moving into Marquis's bed as the scene fades to an exterior night shot of the prison.

The next day, Helene arranges with the warden for a private visit with Sommer, where she intends to tell him about Steinau, but she does not. Nor does Sommer say anything. The short meeting is awkward and distant. Later, Steinau makes his presentation calling for a penal system reform, but the representative is unswayed. Steinau asks Helene to divorce Sommer and marry him, but she refuses.

Marquis is released, and Sommer shortly after him. Marquis is briefly seen by the river with another man, happily commenting that Sommer got out today. The other man cynically responds that he could make a good deal of money if Sommer is rich, to which Marquis takes offense and walks away. Though not spelled out, the suggestion is that one could use Paragraph 175 (the German law against homosexual acts) to blackmail Sommer, in the same way that it is used against Paul Körner in Different from the Others.

Sommer goes home, where his wife is happy to see him, and he is happy to be free, but confesses he no longer loves her. Helene thinks he has found out about Steinau, but when she mentions him, he knows nothing of it. It is at that point that there is a knock at the door and Helene opens it to find Marquis with a bouquet of flowers come to see Sommer. Helene then figures it all out. Sommer, now even more depressed, sends him away. He leaves the flowers on the newelpost in the hallway while offering his apologies to Helene, who sees him out.

Going back inside, she sees Sommer eyeing the gas valve on the heater. He tells her he cannot go on living and urges her to leave, but she will not. He turns on the gas and together, they both die.
