= Carl Heinz Wolff =

German filmmaker

- Born: 11 February 1884; Werdau, Kingdom of Saxony, German Empire
- Died: 9 December 1942 (aged 58); Berlin, Germany
- Occupations: Director, Producer, Writer
- Years active: 1915–1940 (film)

Carl Heinz Wolff (1884–1942) was a German screenwriter, producer and film director.

== Selected filmography ==
=== Director ===
- The Mexican (1918)
- The Prisoner (1920)
- Lord of the Night (1927)
- The Customs Judge (1929)
- Youthful Indiscretion (1929)
- Rag Ball (1930)
- Flachsmann the Educator (1930)
- Such a Greyhound (1931)
- Errant Husbands (1931)
- Mrs. Lehmann's Daughters (1932)
- The Country Schoolmaster (1933)
- Pipin der Kurze (1934)

== Bibliography ==
- Grange, William. Cultural Chronicle of the Weimar Republic. Scarecrow Press, 2008.
