= The Student of Prague (1926 film) =

1926 film

- Directed by: Henrik Galeen
- Screenplay by: Henrik Galeen; Hanns Heinz Ewers
- Produced by: Henry Sokal
- Starring: Conrad Veidt; Werner Krauss; Elizza La Porta; Fritz Alberti; Grafin Agnes
- Music by: Willy Schmidt-Gentner
- Production company: Sokal-Film GmbH
- Release date: 25 October 1926 (Berlin)
- Running time: 91 minutes, 113 minutes (restored version)
- Country: Germany
- Language: Silent

The Student of Prague (German: Der Student von Prag) is a 1926 German Expressionist silent film by actor and filmmaker Henrik Galeen.

== Plot ==
In the year 1820, Balduin is a student at a university in Prague. At a student-led outing to a country inn, Balduin encounters the figure Scapinelli who offers him money "for very low interest." Balduin believes him to be a loan shark and ignores him to go engage in a fencing match with another student.

After the match, the viewer sees Scapinelli on a cliffside, watching a young woman (later revealed to be Margit, the daughter of a count) on horseback who is participating in a boar-hunt. He manipulates the situation such that the animals run amok and head towards the inn. Margit's horse runs away with her and Balduin catches her when she falls off. As a reward, she gives Balduin a crucifix which has fallen from her neck and later he receives an invitation to the house of her father, Count Schwarzenberg. There he becomes aware of his own poverty in comparison to Margit's fiancé, who is a baron.

Later that night, Scapinelli again comes for Balduin and makes an offer. Balduin signs a contract stipulating that Scapinelli can have anything in the room he wants in return for 600,000 florins. Balduin signs and Scapinelli takes out a small bag and proceeds to pour the entirety of the 600,000 onto the table. Scapinelli then takes his part: Balduin's reflection.

The scene then shifts to show the new lifestyle that Balduin is leading with his newfound fortune. His happiness does not last long, because his reflection, free of the mirror, runs amok, causing havoc around town, which is blamed on Balduin. Balduin, in his final confrontation, shoots his reflection. This results in his own death. The movie closes as it opens: with a shot of Balduin's grave, upon which is inscribed "Here lies Balduin. He fought the devil and lost".

== Cast ==
- Conrad Veidt as Balduin, The Student
- Werner Krauss as Scapinelli
- Elizza La Porta as Lyduschka, a flowergirl
- Agnes Esterhazy as Margit von Schwarzenberg
- Fritz Alberti as Count of Schwarzenberg, Margit's Vater
- Ferdinand von Alten as Baron of Waldis, Margit's fiancé
- Erich Kober as Student
- Max Maximilian as Student
- Sylvia Torf
- Marian Alma
- Horst Wessel extra in some scenes

== Production ==
It is considered as Galeen's most important film since The Golem (1915) and is regarded as his magnum opus.

The film's screenplay was written by Galeen and Hanns Heinz Ewers and was influenced by the story of Faust. The film had previously been made as The Student of Prague.

It was shot at the Staaken Studios in Berlin. Among the crew was designer Hermann Warm; cinematographer Günther Krampf; and the actors Werner Krauss, Conrad Veidt, Dagny Servaes, Leni Riefenstahl and Elizza La Porta. Der Student von Prag made La Porta a well-known actress. The film featured impressive special effects for its time, especially the finale in which the lead character is forced to confront his other half, with seamlessly executed split screen technology.

== Release ==
The Student of Prague was shown in Berlin on 25 October 1926. The film was remade as a sound film in 1935, directed by Arthur Robinson. The Munich Film Archive released a 113 minute restored version in 1999, featuring new music and tinting.

== Reception ==
From retrospective reviews, Troy Howarth wrote in his book Tome of Terror that the film was a "marked improvement" over the 1913 version of the film which was "creaky and antiquated by comparison".
