= August Rinaldi =

German art director (1883–1962)

- Born: 16 September 1883; German Empire
- Died: 6 December 1962 (aged 79); Los Angeles, California, United States
- Occupation: Art director
- Years active: 1916–1932 (film )

August Rinaldi (1883–1962) was a German art director. He worked on around fifty films during the silent era. Rinaldi was of Jewish descent.

== Selected filmography ==
- Let There Be Light (1917)
- Diary of a Lost Woman (1918)
- The Face Removed (1920)
- Blackmailed (1920)
- Waves of Life and Love (1921)
- The Railway King (1921)
- Circus People (1922)
- The Game of Love (1924)
- The Circus of Life (1926)
- The Tales of Hermann (1926)
- The Field Marshal (1927)
- A Girl of the People (1927)
- Girls, Beware! (1928)
- Sixteen Daughters and No Father (1928)
- The Women's War (1928)
- Somnambul (1929)
- Sin and Morality (1929)
- Crucified Girl (1929)
- Miss Midshipman (1929)
- Marriage Strike (1930)

== Bibliography ==
- Prawer, S.S. Between Two Worlds: The Jewish Presence in German and Austrian Film, 1910-1933. Berghahn Books, 2005.
