= Georg C. Klaren =

Austrian screenwriter and film director

- Born: 10 September 1900; Vienna, Austro-Hungarian Empire
- Died: 18 November 1962 (aged 62); Sawbridgeworth, Hertfordshire, England
- Other name: Georg Eugen Moritz Alexander Klaric
- Occupations: Screenwriter; Film director
- Years active: 1926–1955

Georg C. Klaren (1900–1962) was an Austrian screenwriter and film director. He worked on a number of screenplays with Herbert Juttke during the silent and early sound eras including Alfred Hitchcock's 1931 film Mary. After the Second World War, Klaren became the head dramaturge at the East German state-owned studio DEFA.

== Selected filmography ==
=== Screenwriter ===
- Nanette Makes Everything (1926)
- Department Store Princess (1926)
- I Liked Kissing Women (1926)
- Assassination (1927)
- The Transformation of Dr. Bessel (1927)
- Flirtation (1927)
- Casanova's Legacy (1928)
- Sex in Chains (1928)
- Fair Game (1928)
- The Lady and the Chauffeur (1928)
- Odette (1928)
- A Knight in London (1929)
- Kolonne X (1929)
- The Lord of the Tax Office (1929)
- Somnambul (1929)
- Devotion (1929)
- Cagliostro (1929)
- Marriage in Trouble (1929)
- Perjury (1929)
- Peter the Mariner (1929)
- The Right of the Unborn (1929)
- The Hound of the Baskervilles (1929)
- Busy Girls (1930)
- Oh Those Glorious Old Student Days (1930)
- Elisabeth of Austria (1931)
- The Lovers of Midnight (1931)
- Mary (1931)
- Madame Bluebeard (1931)
- Gloria (1931)
- Chauffeur Antoinette (1932)
- Antoinette (1932)
- The Love Contract (1932)
- The Secret of Johann Orth (1932)
- Three from the Unemployment Office (1932)
- A Woman Like You (1933)
- There Is Only One Love (1933)
- The Little Crook (1933)
- Frasquita (1934)
- Pillars of Society (1935)
- The Cossack and the Nightingale (1935)
- Ave Maria (1936)
- A Woman Between Two Worlds (1936)
- Shadows of the Past (1936)
- The Love of the Maharaja (1936)
- The Chief Witness (1937)
- Heimweh (1937)
- The Beaver Coat (1937)
- The Holm Murder Case (1938)
- The False Step (1939)
- Clarissa (1941)
- Doctor Crippen (1942)
- Voyage Without Hope (1943)
- Love's Carnival (1955)

=== Director ===
- Manolescu, Prince of Thieves (1933)
- Wozzeck (1947)
- Semmelweis – Retter der Mütter (1950)
- The Sonnenbrucks (1951)
- Call Over the Air (1951)
- Karriere in Paris (1952)
- Daughter of the Regiment (1953)

== Bibliography ==
- McGilligan, Patrick. Alfred Hitchcock: A Life in Darkness and Light. HarperCollins, 2004.
