= Unheimliche Geschichten =

Unheimliche Geschichten may refer to:

- Unheimliche Geschichten (1919 film), a silent film starring Conrad Veidt
- Unheimliche Geschichten (1932 film), a talkie film starring Paul Wegener
