= I Lost My Heart in Heidelberg =

I Lost My Heart in Heidelberg (German:Ich hab mein Herz in Heidelberg verloren) may refer to:

- I Lost My Heart in Heidelberg (song), a 1925 song composed by Fred Raymond
- I Lost My Heart in Heidelberg (musical), a 1927 musical composed by Fred Raymond
- I Lost My Heart in Heidelberg (1926 film), a German silent film directed by Arthur Bergen
- I Lost My Heart in Heidelberg (1952 film), a West German film directed by Ernst Neubach
