= We Belong to the Imperial-Royal Infantry Regiment =

1926 film by Richard Oswald

- Directed by: Richard Oswald
- Written by: Richard Oswald
- Produced by: Richard Oswald
- Starring: Mary Kid; Paul Heidemann; Fritz Spira; Colette Brettel
- Cinematography: Arpad Viragh
- Music by: Hans May
- Production company: Richard-Oswald-Produktion
- Distributed by: Bavaria Film
- Release date: 29 June 1926
- Running time: 107 minutes
- Country: Germany
- Languages: Silent; German intertitles

We Belong to the Imperial and Royal Infantry Regiment (German: Wir sind vom K. u. K. Infanterie-Regiment) is a 1926 German silent comedy film starring Mary Kid, Paul Heidemann and Fritz Spira. It was shot at the Halensee Studios in Berlin and on location in Vienna. The film's art direction was by Heinrich Richter. Oswald, an Austrian by birth, intended it as a tribute to the atmosphere of Imperial Vienna.

== Cast ==
- Mary Kid as Lilly
- Paul Heidemann as Pepi Pfundmeier
- Fritz Spira as Oberst von Fahrnbach
- Colette Brettel as Trudl
- Grit Haid as Gretl
- Lydia Potechina as Pepis Erbtante
- Hans Brausewetter as Pepis Diener
- Hans Albers as Oberleutnant Ahrens
- Paul Morgan as Sanitätsunteroffizier
- Camilla Spira as Köchin
- Mira Hildebrand as Hausmädchen
- Jolly as Rekrut
- Julius Falkenstein as Rekrut
- Leo Morgenstern as Rekrut
- Wilhelm Bendow
- Fritz Kampers

== See also ==
- Imperial and Royal Infantry

== Bibliography ==
- Prawer, S.S. Between Two Worlds: The Jewish Presence in German and Austrian Film, 1910–1933. Berghahn Books, 2005.
