= Secret Sinners =

Secret Sinners may refer to:

- Secret Sinners (1926 film), a German silent film
- Secret Sinners (1933 film), an American drama film
