= Madame Récamier (disambiguation) =

Madame Récamier or Juliette Recamier (1777-1849) was a historical French figure.

Madame Récamier may also refer to:

- Madame Récamier (1920 film), a German silent film
- Madame Récamier (1928 film), a French silent film
