= Bernd Aldor =

German actor (1881–1950)

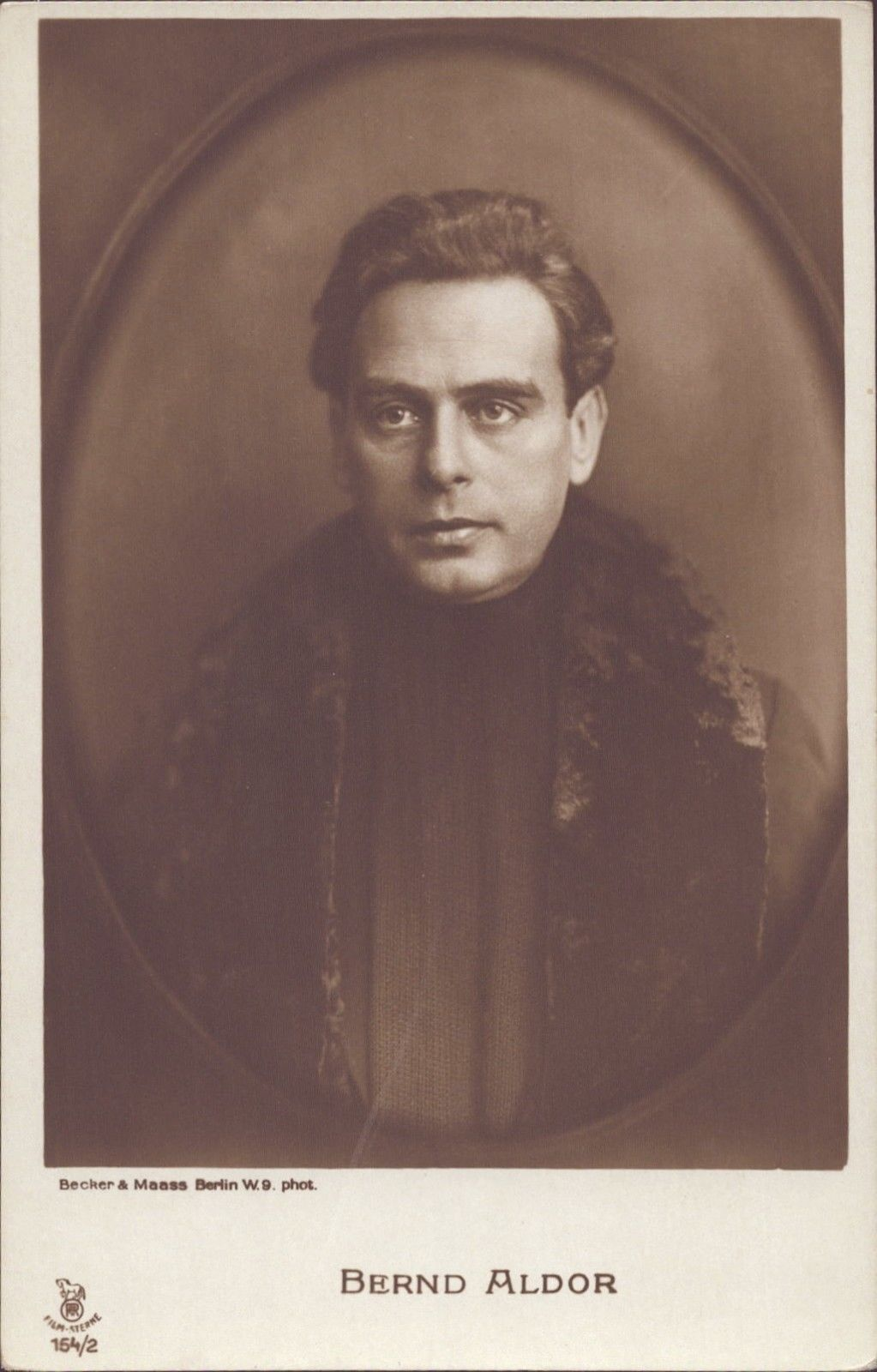
- Born: 23 March 1881; Constantinople, Ottoman Empire
- Died: 20 October 1950 (aged 69); Vienna, Austria
- Occupations: Film actor Stage actor
- Years active: 1900–1931

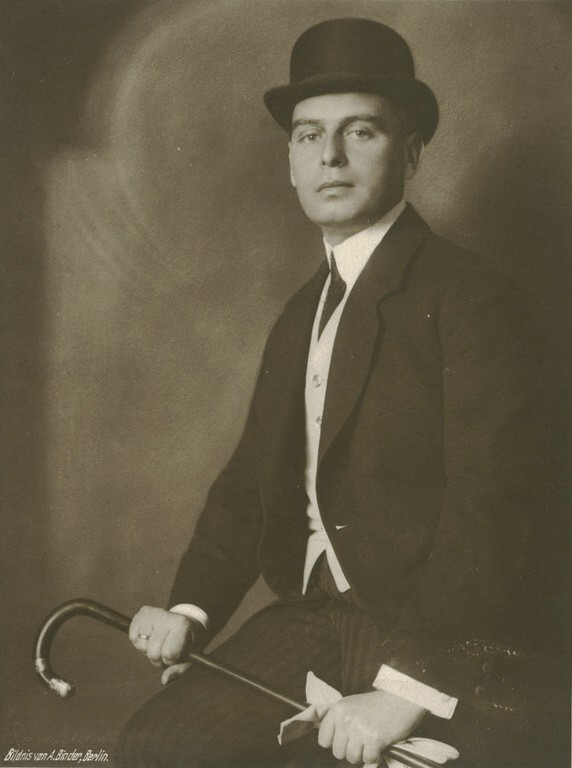
Aldor, c.1921

Bernd Aldor (23 March 1881 – 20 October 1950) was a German stage and film actor. Aldor was a leading star of German cinema during the 1910s and 1920s. He appeared regularly in the films of Richard Oswald and Lupu Pick, often in detective thrillers. Aldor also notably appeared in the 1917 social enlightenment film Let There Be Light.

== Selected filmography ==
- The Picture of Dorian Gray (1917)
- Let There Be Light (1917)
- The Lord of Hohenstein (1917)
- The Mirror of the World (1918)
- Madame Récamier (1920)
- The Fear of Women (1921)
- Count Cohn (1923)
- The Misanthrope (1923)
- Orient Fever (1923)
- The Affair of Baroness Orlovska (1923)
- The Doomed (1924)
- Semi-Silk (1925)
- Ash Wednesday (1925)
- The Old Fritz (1928)
- Indizienbeweis (1929)
- Vendetta (1929)
- Dreyfus (1930)
- Two People (1930)
- Elisabeth of Austria (1931)

== Bibliography ==
- Kay Weniger: 'Es wird im Leben dir mehr genommen als gegeben ...'. Lexikon der aus Deutschland und Österreich emigrierten Filmschaffenden 1933 bis 1945. Eine Gesamtübersicht. p. 68, Acabus-Verlag, Hamburg 2011, ISBN 978-3-86282-049-8
- Rogowski, Christian. The Many Faces of Weimar cinema: Rediscovering Germany's Filmic Legacy. Camden House, 2010.
