= Vienna, City of Song =

1930 film

- Directed by: Richard Oswald
- Written by: Max Ehrlich; Ernst Morgan; Ernst Neubach
- Produced by: Richard Oswald
- Starring: Charlotte Ander; Paul Morgan; Igo Sym; Sig Arno
- Music by: Hans May
- Production company: Richard-Oswald-Produktion
- Distributed by: Atlas-Filmverleih
- Release date: 3 April 1930
- Running time: 101 minutes
- Country: Germany
- Language: German

Vienna, City of Song (German: Wien, du Stadt der Lieder) is a 1930 German musical comedy film directed by Richard Oswald and starring Charlotte Ander, Paul Morgan and Igo Sym. It was shot at the Babelsberg Studios in Berlin. The film's sets were designed by the art director Franz Schroedter.

== Cast ==
- Charlotte Ander as Steffi
- Paul Morgan as Pokorny, Scheidermeister
- Igo Sym as Pepi, Pokornys Sohn
- Max Hansen as Burgstaller, Fleischermeister
- Siegfried Arno as Ferdinand, Zahlkellner
- Paul Graetz as Piefke, Reisender aus Berlin
- Max Ehrlich as Old Printer
- Sigi Hofer as Ignaz Korn, Steffis Vater
- Dora Hrach as Emilie, Ingaz Frau
- Irene Ambrus as Ilona, Verkäuferin
- Grete Natzler as Frau Bock, Cafétiere
- Gustl Gstettenbaur as Gustl, Pikkolo
- Luigi Bernauer as Natursänger

== Bibliography ==
- Bock, Hans-Michael & Bergfelder, Tim. The Concise CineGraph. Encyclopedia of German Cinema. Berghahn Books, 2009.
- Prawer, S.S. Between Two Worlds: The Jewish Presence in German and Austrian Film, 1910-1933. Berghahn Books, 2005.
