= Should We Be Silent? =

1926 film

- Directed by: Richard Oswald
- Written by: Richard Oswald
- Produced by: Heinrich Nebenzahl; Richard Oswald
- Starring: Conrad Veidt; Walter Rilla; Henri De Vries; Mary Parker
- Cinematography: Gustav Ucicky; Eduard von Borsody
- Music by: Hans May
- Production company: Nero Film
- Distributed by: Bavaria Film
- Release date: 6 April 1926
- Running time: 89 minutes
- Country: Germany
- Languages: Silent; German intertitles

Should We Be Silent? (German: Dürfen wir schweigen?) is a 1926 German silent drama film directed by Richard Oswald and starring Conrad Veidt, Walter Rilla and Henri De Vries. It was made at the Johannisthal Studios in Berlin. The film's art direction was by Heinrich Richter-Berlin. The film exists only in fragmentary form.

== Cast ==
- Conrad Veidt as Paul Hartwig, painter
- Walter Rilla as Dr. Georg Mauthner
- Henri De Vries as Henry Pierson, town councillor
- Mary Parker as Leonie Pierson, his daughter
- Elga Brink as assistant
- Frida Richard as old woman
- Fritz Kortner as announcing doctor
- John Gottowt as his factotum
- Maria Forescu as 1st patient
- Else Plessner as 2nd patient
- Betty Astor as Inge
- Ernő Verebes as Gerd
- Albert Paulig as waiter

== Bibliography ==
- Soister, John T. & Battle, Pat Wilks. Conrad Veidt on Screen: A Comprehensive Illustrated Filmography. McFarland, 2002.
