= I Was a Student at Heidelberg =

1927 German silent film directed by Wolfgang Neff

- Directed by: Wolfgang Neff
- Written by: Paul Beyer
- Starring: Mary Kid; Eva Speyer
- Cinematography: Emil Schünemann
- Music by: Walther Bransen; Gustav Gold
- Production company: F.P.G. Film
- Release date: 1 July 1927
- Country: Germany
- Languages: Silent; German intertitles

I Was a Student at Heidelberg (German: Ich war zu Heidelberg Student) is as a 1927 German silent film directed by Wolfgang Neff and starring Mary Kid and Eva Speyer.

The film's art direction was by Gustav A. Knauer.

== Cast ==
In alphabetical order

- Franz Baumann
- Friedrich Benfer
- Wilhelm Diegelmann
- Hugo Döblin
- Werner Fuetterer
- Robert Garrison
- Fritz Greiner
- Charles Willy Kayser
- Alice Kempen
- Mary Kid
- Hermann Picha
- Eva Speyer
- Eduard von Winterstein
- Lotte Werkmeister

== Bibliography ==
- Douglas B. Thomas. The early history of German motion pictures, 1895-1935. Thomas International, 1999.
