= Suzy Saxophone =

1928 film

- Directed by: Karel Lamač
- Written by: Bobby E. Lüthge; Tom Maro; Hans H. Zerlett (play)
- Starring: Anny Ondra; Hans Albers
- Cinematography: Otto Heller
- Production company: Hom-AG für Filmfabrikation
- Distributed by: Süd-Film
- Release date: 26 October 1928
- Running time: 109 minutes
- Countries: France; Germany
- Languages: Silent; German intertitles

Suzy Saxophone or Saxophone Suzy (German: Saxophon-Susi) is a 1928 French-German silent comedy film directed by Karel Lamač and starring Anny Ondra and Hans Albers. It was shot at the Johannisthal Studios in Berlin. The film's art direction was by Carl Ludwig Kirmse.

== Cast ==
- Anny Ondra as Anni von Aspen
- Mary Parker as Susi Hille
- Gaston Jacquet as Baron von Aspen
- Olga Limburg as Baronin von Aspen
- Malcolm Tod as Lord Herbert Southcliffe
- Grit Haid as La Tanja
- Margarete Kupfer as Mrs. Hille
- Paul Biensfeldt as Mr. Hille
- Mira Dore as Mrs. Triller
- Karl Eichberger as Georg Philipps
- Theodor Pištěk as John
- Oreste Bilancia as Jack Brown
- John Franklyn as Dancer
- Hans Albers as Harry Holt
- Carl Walther Meyer
- Hermann Picha
- Gyula Szőreghy

== Bibliography ==
- Grange, William (2008). Cultural Chronicle of the Weimar Republic. Lanham, MD: Scarecrow Press. ISBN 978-0-8108-5967-8.
