= Klettermaxe =

Klettermaxe may refer to:

- Klettermaxe (1927 film), directed by Willy Reiber
- Klettermaxe (1952 film), directed by Kurt Hoffmann
