= Ship of Girls =

1929 film

- Directed by: Robert Wohlmuth
- Written by: Siegfried Bernfeld
- Produced by: Fritz Deitz
- Starring: Margot Landa; Luigi Serventi; Attila Hörbiger
- Cinematography: Hans Theyer
- Production company: Hegewald Film
- Release date: 28 October 1929
- Countries: Austria; Germany
- Languages: Silent; German intertitles

Ship of Girls or Living Goods (German: Lebende Ware or Das Mädchenschiff) is a 1929 Austrian-German silent drama film directed by Robert Wohlmuth and starring Margot Landa, Luigi Serventi and Attila Hörbiger. Its plot concerns white slavery.

== Cast ==
- Margot Landa as Miss Europe
- Luigi Serventi as Charles Barrow
- Theodor Pištěk as Jack Brown
- Attila Hörbiger as RIII
- Eugen Neufeld as Prefect of Costo Roma
- El' Dura as Myrrha
- Paula Pfluger

== Bibliography ==
- Gandert, Gero. 1929. Walter de Gruyter, 1993.
