= The Fear of Women =

1921 film

- Directed by: Hanna Henning
- Written by: Georg Engel (novel); Hanna Henning
- Starring: Bernd Aldor; Wilhelm Diegelmann; Otto Gebühr; Robert Leffler
- Cinematography: Charles Paulus
- Production company: Continental-Film
- Distributed by: Bremer Film
- Release date: 23 June 1921
- Country: Germany
- Languages: Silent; German intertitles

The Fear of Women (German:Die Furcht vor dem Weibe) is a 1921 German silent drama film directed by Hanna Henning and starring Bernd Aldor, Wilhelm Diegelmann and Otto Gebühr. The film was based on a novel by Georg Engel. It premiered in Berlin on 23 June 1921. The film's art direction was by Julian Ballenstedt.

== Cast ==
In alphabetical order

- Bernd Aldor as Stubengelehrter
- Wilhelm Diegelmann
- Otto Gebühr
- Robert Leffler
- Marija Leiko as Reederstochter
- Max Pohl
- Paula Conrada Schlenther
- Hermine Straßmann-Witt
- Ernst Wurmser
- Toni Zimmerer

== Bibliography ==
- Grange, William. Cultural Chronicle of the Weimar Republic.Scarecrow Press, 2008.
