= Upstairs and Downstairs (1925 film) =

1925 German film

- Hans Albers (left) in a scene from the film
- Directed by: Richard Oswald; Carl Wilhelm
- Written by: Richard Oswald
- Produced by: Richard Oswald
- Starring: Max Adalbert; Mary Kid; Valeska Stock
- Cinematography: Emil Schünemann
- Music by: Felix Bartsch
- Production company: Transatlantische Film
- Distributed by: Deulig-Verleih
- Release date: 30 November 1925
- Running time: 70 minutes
- Country: Germany
- Languages: Silent; German intertitles

Upstairs and Downstairs (German: Vorderhaus und Hinterhaus) is a 1925 German silent film directed by Richard Oswald and Carl Wilhelm and starring Max Adalbert, Mary Kid and Valeska Stock.

The film's sets were designed by the art director Heinrich Richter.

== Cast ==
- Max Adalbert as Adalbert Marx
- Mary Kid as Ilse, seine Tochter
- Valeska Stock as Frau Brenneis
- Mary Parker as Iduna, Frau Brenneis Tochter
- Sig Arno as Graf A. Rohnstein
- Hans Albers as Otto Flaschenhals
- Betty Astor as Dolly
- Trude Hesterberg as Auguste, Mädchen für alles
- Kurt Gerron
- Harry Hardt

== Bibliography ==
- Bock, Hans-Michael & Bergfelder, Tim. The Concise CineGraph. Encyclopedia of German Cinema. Berghahn Books, 2009.
