= The Green Alley =

1928 silent film

- German release poster
- Directed by: Richard Oswald
- Written by: Else Jerusalem (novel); Franz Schulz
- Produced by: Richard Oswald
- Starring: Grete Mosheim; Gustav Fröhlich; Marija Leiko; Else Heims
- Cinematography: Franz Planer
- Production company: Richard-Oswald-Produktion
- Distributed by: Deutsche Universal
- Release date: 24 September 1928
- Running time: 89 minutes
- Country: Germany
- Languages: Silent; German intertitles

The Green Alley (German: Die Rothausgasse) is a 1928 German silent drama film directed by Richard Oswald and starring Grete Mosheim, Gustav Fröhlich and Marija Leiko. The film was made by the German branch of Universal Pictures and was based on the novel Der heilige Skarabäus by Else Jerusalem. It was shot at the Staaken Studios in Berlin. The art direction was overseen by Gustav A. Knauer and Willy Schiller.

== Cast ==
- Grete Mosheim as Milada Rezek
- Gustav Fröhlich as Gustav Brenner
- Marija Leiko as Katherina Rezek
- Else Heims as Frau Goldschneider
- Camilla von Hollay as Fritzi, Wirtschafterin
- Hilde Jennings as Helenka
- Paul Otto as Dr. Brenner
- Oskar Homolka as Dr. Horner
- Betty Astor as Miladas Freundin
- Lotte Stein
- Hermann Picha
- Hans Brausewetter

== Bibliography ==
- Weniger, Kay. 'Es wird im Leben dir mehr genommen als gegeben ...' Lexikon der aus Deutschland und Österreich emigrierten Filmschaffenden 1933 bis 1945. ACABUS Verlag, 2011.
