= The Mistress and her Servant =

1929 film directed by Richard Oswald

The Mistress and Her Servant
- Igo Sym and Henny Porten
- Directed by: Richard Oswald
- Written by: Georg Engel (novel); Friedrich Raff
- Produced by: Wilhelm von Kaufmann; Henny Porten
- Starring: Henny Porten; Mary Kid; Fritz Kampers; Igo Sym
- Cinematography: Friedl Behn-Grund
- Production company: Henny Porten Film
- Distributed by: Vereinigte Star-Film
- Release date: 28 December 1929
- Running time: 104 minutes
- Country: Germany
- Languages: Silent; German intertitles

The Mistress and Her Servant (German: Die Herrin und ihr Knecht) is a 1929 German silent drama film directed by Richard Oswald and starring Henny Porten, Mary Kid and Fritz Kampers. It was based on the novel of the same title by Georg Engel. It was shot at the EFA Studios in Berlin. The film's sets were designed by the art director Franz Schroedter.

== Cast ==
- Henny Porten as Johanna von Grothe
- Mary Kid as Marianne, Johannas Schwester
- Fritz Kampers as Oberst Sassin
- Igo Sym as Fürst Fergussow
- Alexander Wiruboff as Erster Adjutant
- Alexander Sascha as Zweiter Adjutant
- Bruno Ziener as Baumgartner
- Renée Stobrawa as Frau Matjunke
- Gustl Gstettenbaur as Hans

== Bibliography ==
- Belach, Helga. Henny Porten.: Der erste deutsche Filmstar. 1890 - 1960.. Haude & Spener, 1986.
- Weniger, Kay. 'Es wird im Leben dir mehr genommen als gegeben ...' Lexikon der aus Deutschland und Österreich emigrierten Filmschaffenden 1933 bis 1945. ACABUS Verlag, 2011.
