= The Misanthrope (1923 film) =

1923 film

- Directed by: Rudolf Walther-Fein
- Produced by: Rudolf Dworsky
- Starring: Werner Krauss; Bernd Aldor; Reinhold Schünzel
- Production company: Aafa-Film
- Distributed by: Aafa-Film
- Release date: 26 April 1923
- Country: Germany
- Languages: Silent; German intertitles

The Misanthrope (German: Der Menschenfeind) is a 1923 German silent film directed by Rudolf Walther-Fein and starring Werner Krauss, Bernd Aldor and Reinhold Schünzel.

== Plot ==
The son of a greedy merchant, a young museum employee, loves a girl whose father is heavily in debt. The debtor owes money to his future father-in-law. The young woman, however, loves a colleague at the museum, but accepts the museum employee's proposal because he could help her father with her father's money. On their wedding night, his newlywed confesses that she does not love him and rejects the young husband. He learns that his father ultimately forced his new wife into the marriage. Deeply angry and disappointed, the young husband then demands a divorce and subsequently embarks on a long journey. Back home, the ex-husband discovers that his former wife has remarried. This second husband is stealing money from the museum to finance his expensive lifestyle.

To avoid dragging his ex-spouse down with him, the divorced museum employee covers for the thief, but the thief repays him with ingratitude by accusing the museum employee of attempted theft. The honest ex-husband is then removed from his position. His wife does not defend him, as she does not want to see the name of the child she has with her second husband tarnished. Deeply bitter and disappointed by all the evil that surrounds him, the former museum employee goes into the solitude of the mountains, where he is only cured of his budding misanthropy by the kindness of an honest creature. When his ex-wife and her cheating husband show up there, they are killed in an avalanche. But their child, who has done nothing wrong, is saved and adopted by the first husband.

== Cast ==
- Werner Krauss
- Bernd Aldor
- Reinhold Schünzel
- Dagny Servaes
- Ilka Grüning
- Lili Alexandra
- Eduard von Winterstein
- Leopold von Ledebur
- Erwin Biswanger
- Wilhelm Diegelmann
- Margarete Kupfer

== Reception ==
The Kino-Journal stated: "This inherently attractive subject is enriched by artistically perfect images of the winter mountains.The pure splendor and beauty of the magnificent nature offers a kind of contrast to the petty activities of the people, and one understands that only in the solitude of the mountains can a wounded soul find healing."

Die Stunde wrote: "The film's photography deserves full admiration, especially the parts of the film set in snowy landscapes and the descent of an avalanche are technically excellently shot."

== Bibliography ==
- Grange, William. Cultural Chronicle of the Weimar Republic. Scarecrow Press, 2008.
