= Harry Domela =

Latvian imposter

- Born: 1905; Kurland, Russian Empire (present-day Courland, Latvia)
- Died: 4 October 1979 (aged 73–74); Maracaibo, Venezuela
- Occupation: Imposter
- Known for: Pretending to be a deposed German crown prince

Harry Domela (1905 – 4 October 1979) was a Russian-born impostor who pretended to be a deposed German crown prince.

== Biography ==
Harry Domela was born to German parents in 1905 in Kurland, Russian Empire. At the age of fifteen he fought in the first Freikorps against Baltic rebels. He moved to Germany after World War I. His brothers and his father had died in the war.

Domela was too young to join the army corps after the war and thus held numerous menial jobs. At this same time he was imprisoned several times for his experimenting with impostures of various titles including Baron Korff.

His big break came when he went to Heidelberg and impressed himself on the members of German nobility who had been stripped of their official titles by the Weimar Republic. He presented himself as "Prince Lieven of Latvia", but managed to create an impression that this was only part of the truth. Aristocrats noticed his resemblance to Prince Wilhelm of Prussia, grandson of the deposed Wilhelm II, German Emperor. In no time, upper class circles were rife with rumors that he was in fact the heir of the German throne who was traveling incognito.

As a result, when he travelled in Thuringia and Prussia local pro-monarchy dignitaries and businessmen entertained him at their own expense. He never asked for or received money from them. Soon however he began to attract the attention of the press and thus suspected that his imposture would soon be over. Eventually he decided to leave for France to try to join the French Foreign Legion. He was arrested when he was boarding the train.

For the next seven months he was in prison in Cologne, waiting for his trial. He used this time to write the narrative of his experiences, A Sham Prince: The Life and Adventures of Harry Domela as Written by Himself in Prison at Cologne, January to June 1927. In the trial, the court ruled that his imposture had been harmless and he was acquitted of the charges.

Domela's book sold well, and soon he had sold the movie rights to it. There were two plays about his life; in one he played himself (he sued the actor who played him in the other one, but lost the lawsuit). In 1927 he starred in a film The False Prince, based on his own experiences. However, by 1930 he had disappeared from the public life.

Domela left Germany for the Netherlands in 1933 and lived with false papers as "Victor Zsajka". He befriended Dutch author Jef Last who acquainted him with André Gide. Domela served with Last in the Spanish Republican forces during the Spanish Civil War. Afterwards he stayed in Belgium until he moved to France where he was interned by the Vichy France regime. Gide helped him to leave for Mexico.

Domela later resurfaced as a teacher in Venezuela and contacted Jef Last in 1965. After last being seen in 1978 according to research by Weimar-based scholar Jens Kirsten, Domela died in 1979 in Maracaibo.

== Filmography ==
- The False Prince (1927)

== See also ==
- List of solved missing person cases: 1950–1999
