= Durand Versus Durand =

1931 film

- Directed by: Eugen Thiele; Léo Joannon
- Written by: Roger Féral; Henry Gilbert; Jacques Monteux
- Produced by: Nikolaus Nowik; Edgar Röll
- Starring: Roger Tréville; Paul Asselin; Jeanne Helbling
- Cinematography: Georg Bruckbauer; Viktor Gluck
- Music by: Jim Cowler; Leo Leux
- Production companies: Nowik & Roell-Film; Societé Internationale Cinématographique
- Release date: 27 November 1931
- Running time: 85 minutes
- Countries: France; Germany
- Language: French

Durand Versus Durand (French: Durand contre Durand) is a 1931 French-German comedy film directed by Eugen Thiele and Léo Joannon and starring Roger Tréville, Paul Asselin and Jeanne Helbling. The film's sets were designed by the art director Heinrich Richter. A separate German-language version Einer Frau muß man alles verzeih'n was also released.

== Cast ==
- Roger Tréville as Max Durand I (champagne)
- Paul Asselin as Max Durand II (couture)
- Jeanne Helbling as Suzy
- Clara Tambour as Gaby Pirouette
- Henri Kerny as Dieudonné
- Henri Chomette as Le pianiste
- Jules Mondos as Lévy-Bloch
- Doumel as Le coiffeur
- Simone Simon as Éliane
- Mady Berry as Mme Dieudonné

== Bibliography ==
- Philippe Rège. Encyclopedia of French Film Directors, Volume 1. Scarecrow Press, 2009.
