= Erwin Biswanger =

German actor and screenwriter (1896–1944)

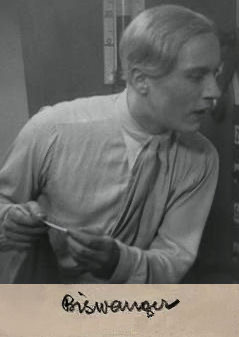
Biswanger in 1926

Erwin Paul Biswanger (26 November 1896 in Berlin – 28 October 1944 in Berlin) was a German actor and screenwriter most famous for his role as Georgy in Metropolis (1927).

== Life and work ==
Little is known about Biswanger's life and career. The son of the saddler and upholsterer Carl Biswanger and his wife Marie, née Wilke, he was born in Berlin where he was in education until 1918 and, according to his own statement, was a student at the beginning of the Weimar Republic. Despite his claim to have served in World War I, he was brought into films by Richard Eichberg in 1918. Biswanger also appeared on stage after his engagement at the Berlin Lessing Theater (1920/21 season). Until 1926, the blonde actor with the distinctive middle parting appeared in front of the camera in a series of mostly less important productions, only his Giselher in Fritz Lang's legendary Nibelungen films and his worker number 11811, Georgy, in Metropolis by the same director stand out.

In 1926 his film career came to an abrupt end, and although he was still listed in the stage yearbooks until the 1930s, Biswanger was no longer permanently engaged at a theatre. Instead, he devoted himself to writing screenplays around the early phase of World War II. In the early 1940s in particular, he collaborated several times with other authors such as the Austrian Alexander Lix. Later, he worked on Harry Piel’s film Panik. He died in 1944 in the sanatorium and care facility in Berlin-Buch.

== Filmography (selection) ==
As an actor

- 1918: Der Narr hat sie geküßt
- 1919: Morphium
- 1919: Die Hoffnung auf Segen
- 1920: Dieb und Weib
- 1920: Uriel Acosta
- 1920: Wildes Blut
- 1921: Der Mann ohne Nerven
- 1921: Unter Räubern und Bestien
- 1923: Erdgeist
- 1923: Der Menschenfeind
- 1924: Die Nibelungen, Part 1
- 1924: Die Nibelungen, Part 2
- 1924: Die Fahrt ins Verderben
- 1926: Eternal Allegiance
- 1927: Metropolis

As screenwriter

- 1939: In letzter Minute
- 1940: Tip auf Amalia
- 1943: Die große Nummer
- 1940–43/53: Panik

== Bibliography ==
- Hans Richter (Hrsg.): Filmstern. Richters Handbuch der Schauspieler, Regisseure und Schriftsteller des Films (= Kinojahrbuch. Band 4). Hans Hermann Richter Verlag, Berlin-Wilmersdorf 1921/1922, ZDB-ID 1342234-0, S. 13.
