= Secret Sinners (1926 film) =

1926 film

- Directed by: Franz Seitz
- Written by: Max Ferner
- Starring: Dorothea Wieck; Mary Kid; Margarete Kupfer
- Cinematography: Karl Attenberger
- Music by: Hans May
- Production company: Münchner Lichtspielkunst
- Distributed by: Bavaria Film
- Release date: 22 June 1926
- Country: Germany
- Languages: Silent; German intertitles

Secret Sinners (German:Heimliche Sünder) is a 1926 German silent film directed by Franz Seitz and starring Dorothea Wieck, Mary Kid and Margarete Kupfer.

The film's art direction was by Willy Reiber. It was made at the Emelka Studios in Munich.

== Cast ==
- Dorothea Wieck
- Mary Kid
- Margarete Kupfer
- Maria Kamradek
- Hans Leibelt
- Victor Colani
- Hermann Pfanz
- Felix Gluth

== Bibliography ==
- Horst O. Hermanni. Das Film ABC Band 5: Von La Jana bis Robert Mulligan. 2011.
