= Unheimliche Geschichten (1919 film) =

German silent anthology film by Richard Oswald

- Theatrical release poster bearing the alternate title Grausige Nächte
- Directed by: Richard Oswald
- Screenplay by: Richard Oswald; Robert Liebmann
- Based on: Edgar Allan Poe; Robert Louis Stevenson
- Produced by: Richard Oswald
- Starring: Conrad Veidt; Reinhold Schünzel; Anita Berber
- Cinematography: Carl Hoffmann
- Production company: Richard Oswald-Film AG
- Release date: 5 November 1919 (Berlin)
- Running time: 95 minutes
- Country: Germany
- Language: German

Unheimliche Geschichten (lit. Uncanny Stories), also known as Grausige Nächte (lit. Nights of Terror) or Eerie Tales, is a 1919 German silent anthology film directed by Richard Oswald and starring Conrad Veidt, Reinhold Schünzel, and Anita Berber. The film is divided into five segments: "The Apparition" (based on a story by Anselm Heine), "The Hand" (based on a story by Robert Liebmann), "The Black Cat" (based on the short story by Edgar Allan Poe), "The Suicide Club" (based on the short stories by Robert Louis Stevenson) and "Der Spuk" ("The Spectre", an original work by Oswald).

Unheimliche Geschichten is also known under the titles Weird Tales, Five Sinister Stories, or Tales of the Uncanny. The original negative of the film is considered lost, though a restoration sourced from a nitrate print by the Cinémathèque française has been released.

A remake by the same name, also directed by Oswald, was released in 1932.

== Plot ==
Full film

A still from Unheimliche Geschichten

At midnight in a closed antiquarian bookshop, three figures – Death, the Devil and the Harlot – step out of paintings and read five macabre stories. The first story is The Apparition, about a man and a woman who check into a hotel. When the woman vanishes, everyone there denies she ever existed. It is later revealed that she died of the plague and the hotel management wanted to cover it up. The second story is called The Hand, about two men who compete over a woman they desire. The loser kills his opponent, which leads to the victim's ghostly hand avenging itself on his murderer. The third story is The Black Cat, about a drunk who murders his wife and walls up her body in his cellar. The family cat reveals his murderous secret to the police. The fourth story is The Suicide Club, about a detective who discovers a secret society only to be chosen as their next victim via a card game. The final story called The Spectre is about a braggart baron who encourages his wife to have an affair with a total stranger. With the completion of the fifth tale, the clock in the shop strikes one and the three ghostly storytellers retreat back into their paintings.

== Cast ==
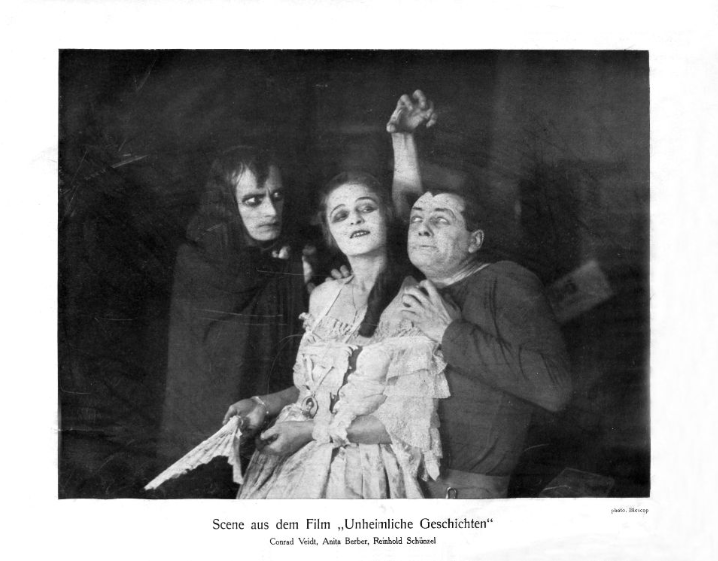
Promotional still

- Anita Berber as Harlot
- Reinhold Schünzel as the Devil
- Conrad Veidt as Death
- Hugo Döblin
- Paul Morgan
- Georg John
- Bernhard Goetzke

== Production ==
Unheimliche Geschichten was directed, produced and co-written by Richard Oswald. The film stars Anita Berber, Reinhold Schünzel and Conrad Veidt as the Harlot, the Devil and Death in the opening sequence, but they also play various other roles in each of the five stories. Each story was based on an author's work, including Anselm Heine (The Apparition, 1912), Robert Liebmann (The Hand), Edgar Allan Poe (The Black Cat, 1843), Robert Louis Stevenson ("The Suicide Club", 1878) and Richard Oswald's own contribution (Der Spuk/ The Spectre).

== Release ==
Unheimliche Geschichten was first shown in Berlin on November 5, 1919. In the book Directory of World Cinema: Germany, Volume 10 Katharina Loew described the film as the "critical link between the more conventional German mystery and detective films of the mid 1910s and the groundbreaking fantastic cinema of the early 1920s". The film is sometimes referred to in reference works as Weird Tales, Eerie Tales, Five Sinister Stories or Tales of the Uncanny.

== Reception ==
From contemporary reviews in Germany, the Berliner Tageblatt praised the acting of Conrad Veidt, the lighting and that the film was effective without having a cast of thousands. The review commented that the pace of the film did stagger at times. Der Kinematograph, also praised Veidt and Oswalds' mastery of film.

From retrospective reviews, Loew has stated that the film did not age well, specifically pointing out the acting which would strike "today's viewers as rather labored." Loew also critiqued the interiors of the film as "unconvincing and ramshackle" and the episodes of the film were uneven.

Troy Howarth comments "The film set something of a standard for subsequent German anthologies, including Fritz Lang's Destiny and Paul Leni's Waxworks.....its tone vacilates clumsily between the macabre and the farcical....". He also comments there are too many stories occupying the running time, saying "its abundance of stories and lack of screen time ultimately work against each other.....Only Conrad Veidt makes much of an impression. He constantly rises above the mediocre quality of the rest of the picture."
