= Love in May =

1928 film

- Directed by: Robert Wohlmuth
- Written by: Siegfried Bernfeld; Fritz Zoreff
- Starring: Wolf Albach-Retty; Betty Astor; Igo Sym
- Cinematography: Nicolas Farkas
- Production company: Grünhut Produktion
- Release date: 1928
- Country: Austria
- Languages: Silent; German intertitles

Love in May (German: Liebe im Mai) is a 1928 Austrian silent film directed by Robert Wohlmuth and starring Wolf Albach-Retty, Betty Astor and Igo Sym. The film's sets were designed by the art directors Artur Berger and Emil Stepanek.

== Cast ==
In alphabetical order

- Wolf Albach-Retty
- Betty Astor
- Oscar Beregi Sr.
- Eugen Guenther
- Hanni Hoess
- Hans Junkermann
- Igo Sym
- Hugo Thimig

== Bibliography ==
- Roman Dziergwa. Am Vorabend des Grauens: Studien zum Spannungsfeld Politik, Literatur, Film in Deutschland und Polen in den 30er Jahren des 20. Jahrhunderts. 2005.
