= Miss Midshipman =

1929 film

- Directed by: Fred Sauer
- Written by: Walter Reisch; Alfred Schirokauer
- Produced by: Leo Meyer
- Starring: Mary Parker; Willi Forst; Fritz Schulz
- Cinematography: Robert Lach; Artur von Schwertführer
- Production company: Essem-Film
- Distributed by: Nero-Film
- Release date: 1 March 1929
- Country: Germany
- Languages: Silent; German intertitles

Miss Midshipman (German: Fräulein Fähnrich) is a 1929 German silent comedy film directed by Fred Sauer and starring Mary Parker, Willi Forst and Fritz Schulz. The film's sets were designed by the art director August Rinaldi.

== Cast ==
- Mary Parker as Nanette von Tankerfang
- Willi Forst as Oberleutnant Mellnitz
- Fritz Schulz as Fähnrich Peter Pfiff
- Leo Peukert as Kapitän Strupps
- Johannes Roth as Kasimir Nolpe
- Valeska Stock as Frau Kapitän Strupps
- Ida Wüst as Vorsteherin des Offizierstöchterheims
- Albert Paulig as Admiral von Tankerang
- Karl Platen as Hauswart
- Paul Morgan as Oberstabsarzt
- Fritz Kampers as Sanitätskorporal
- Emmy Wyda as Leiterin des 'Grauen Hauses'

== Bibliography ==
- Bock, Hans-Michael & Bergfelder, Tim. The Concise CineGraph. Encyclopedia of German Cinema. Berghahn Books, 2009.
