= Tales of Hoffmann (film) =

1916 film directed by Richard Oswald

- German: Hoffmanns Erzählungen
- Directed by: Richard Oswald
- Written by: Fritz Friedmann-Frederich; E. T. A. Hoffmann; Richard Oswald
- Starring: Kurt Wolowsky
- Cinematography: Ernst Krohn
- Release date: 25 February 1916
- Country: Germany
- Language: Silent with German intertitles

Tales of Hoffmann (German: Hoffmanns Erzählungen) is a 1916 silent German drama film directed by Richard Oswald. An incomplete print is held in the collection of the Friedrich Wilhelm Murnau Foundation.

== Cast ==
- Kurt von Wolowski as young Hoffmann
- Max Ruhbeck as Uncle
- Paula Ronay as Aunt
- Werner Krauss as Conte Dapertutto
- Friedrich Kühne as Coppelius, eyeglass merchant
- Lupu Pick as Spalanzani, Museum Director
- Ernst Ludwig as Councillor Crespel
- Nelly Ridon as Mrs Crespel
- Ruth Oswald as little Antonia
- Andreas von Horn as Dr. Mirakel
- Erich Kaiser-Titz as E. T. A. Hoffmann
- Ferdinand Bonn as Municipal Councillor Lindorf
- Käte Oswald as Actress
- Alice Hechy as Olympia, Automaton (as Alice Scheel-Hechy)
- Thea Sandten as Giulietta
- Louis Neher as Schlemihl
- Ressel Orla
