= The False Prince (film) =

1927 film

- Directed by: Heinz Paul
- Written by: Harry Domela (book); Heinz Paul; Hella Moja
- Produced by: Lothar Stark
- Starring: Harry Domela; Ekkehard Arendt; John Mylong; Hans Heinrich von Twardowski
- Cinematography: Gustave Preiss
- Production company: Lothar Stark-Film
- Distributed by: Bavaria Film
- Release date: 1 December 1927
- Running time: 110 minutes
- Country: Germany
- Languages: Silent; German intertitles

The False Prince (German: Der falsche Prinz) is a 1927 German silent adventure film directed by Heinz Paul and starring Harry Domela, Ekkehard Arendt and John Mylong. It was shot at the Johannisthal Studios in Berlin. The film's art direction was by Karl Machus. The film was based on Domela's book recounting his own adventures in post-First World War Germany when he briefly masqueraded as Prince.

== Cast ==
- Harry Domela as Harry Domela
- Ekkehard Arendt as Baron von Korff, His Friend
- John Mylong as Fritz Stein, His Friend
- Hans Heinrich von Twardowski as Wolf, His Friend
- Hans Mierendorff as Wolf's father
- Mary Kid as Wolf's Sister
- Corry Bell as Elizza, a Refugee
- Adolphe Engers as Frabrikant Müller
- Else Reval as His Wife
- Alexander Murski as Baron Von Raaden
- Carl Auen as Legationsrat Garry
- Wilhelm Bendow as The Hotel Director
- Ferdinand Bonn as The Seward
- Hans Sternberg as The Bürgermeister
- Josefine Dora as his wife
- Maria Forescu
- Herta Laurin
- Trude Lehmann
- Sophie Pagay
- Lotte Stein
- Lotte Spira
- Siegfried Berisch
- Carl Geppert
- Willy Kaiser-Heyl
- Hans Leibelt
- Alfred Loretto
- Edgar Pauly
- Paul Rehkopf
- Fritz Richard
- Robert Scholz

== Bibliography ==
- Hermanni, Horst O. Das Film ABC Band 5: Von La Jana bis Robert Mulligan. Books on Demand, 2011.
