= Else Jerusalem =

Austrian writer (1877–1942)

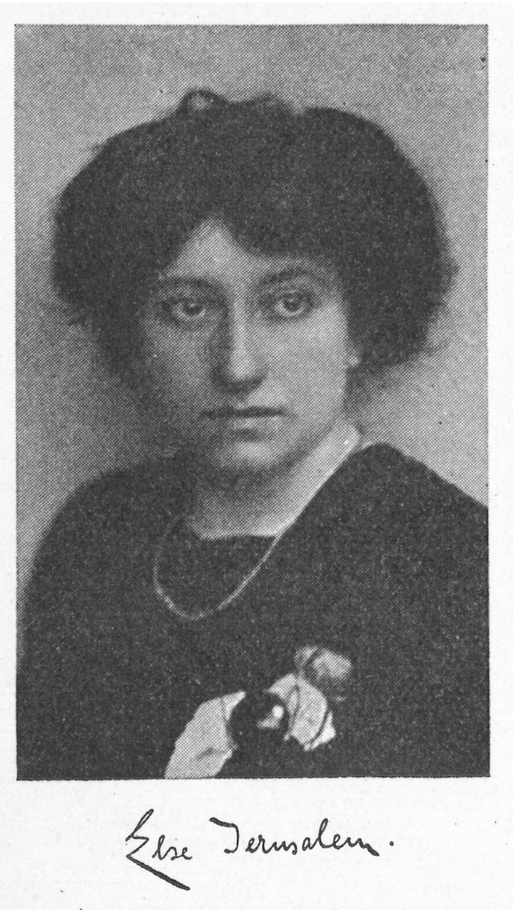
- Else Jerusalem, photographed before 1911.
- Born: Else Kotányi; November 23, 1876; Vienna, Austria
- Died: January 20, 1943 (aged 66); Buenos Aires, Argentina
- Occupations: Feminist writer and researcher
- Writing career
- Language: German
- Notable work: Der heilige Skarabäus (1909)

Else Jerusalem (November 23, 1876 – January 20, 1943) was an Austrian writer and feminist intellectual. Considered a "thought leader" of the period, she is known for her best-selling 1909 novel Der heilige Skarabäus, which was based on her research on prostitution in Vienna.

== Early life and education ==
Else Jerusalem was born Else Kotányi in Vienna in 1876. Her parents, Henriette and Max Kotányi, were middle-class Jews of Hungarian origin; her father worked as a wine merchant.

Though she was denied a full university education, she studied philosophy as a guest student at the University of Vienna, becoming one of the first women to attend the school.

== Writing ==
Jerusalem is best known as a writer and public intellectual. Her work centered on the then extremely controversial topic of female sexuality. Early writing on the subject included Venus am Kreuz (1899) and Komödie der Sinn (1902).

At the turn of the century, she became an influential feminist intellectual in Vienna, serving as a "thought leader" and criticizing such anti-feminist works as Otto Weininger's Geschlecht und Charakter ("Sex and Character"). She also wrote for such magazines as Maximilian Harden's Die Zukunft. Jerusalem is considered an important member of the fin-de-siècle bourgeois women's movement in Austria.

In her 1902 work Gebt uns die Wahrheit! ("Give Us the Truth!"), based on a speech she had given the previous year, she advocated for sex education to prepare young women for married life.

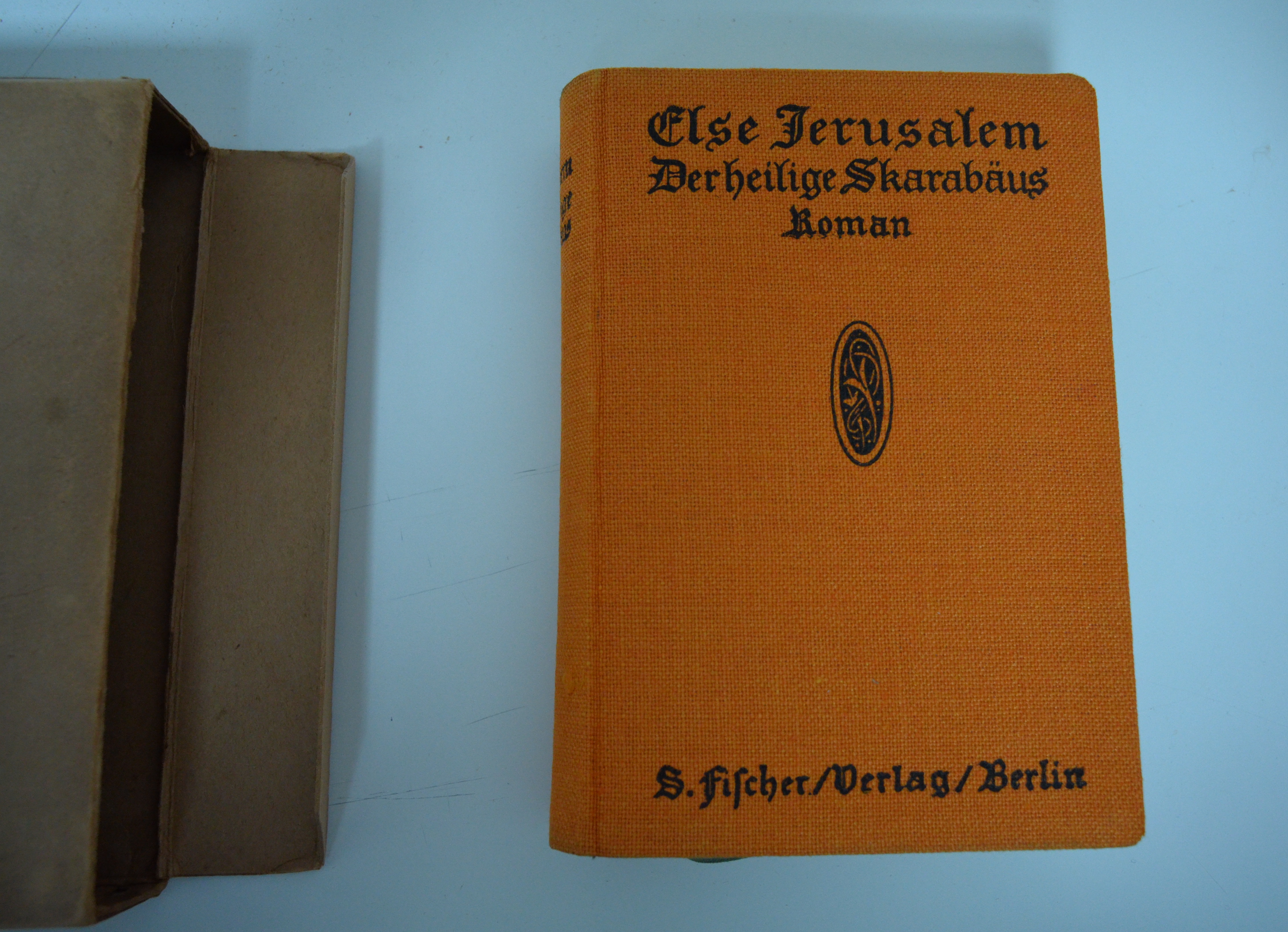
A first-edition copy of Der heilige Skarabäus.

Jerusalem conducted independent research on prostitution in early 20th-century Vienna. In 1909, she published the 700-page book Der heilige Skarabäus ("The Sacred Scarab"), which became a best-seller. The novel was based on her own investigative research. Set in a Vienna brothel, its content was scandalous for the period.

In 1928, Der heilige Skarabäus was adapted into the German silent film The Green Alley. It was published in an abridged English translation as The Red House in 1932. However, when the Nazis took power later in the decade, they banned the book. After decades out of print, Der heilige Skarabäus was republished in Austria in 2016 by the publisher Das vergessene Buch, accompanied by research from the scholar Brigitte Spreitzer. A complete English translation, by Stephanie Gorrell Ortega, was published in 2024.

After emigrating to Argentina in 1911, Jerusalem also produced a play, Steinigung in Sakya (1929), and a philosophical treatise, Die Dreieinigkeit der menschlichen Grundkräfte (1939).

== Personal life ==
She married her first husband, the factory owner Alfred Jerusalem, in 1901, and had two children with him: Edith and Fritz Albert. Her son would go on to become the communist writer Fritz Jensen. After she divorced Alfred, she married Viktor Widakowich in 1910. She denounced her Jewish faith in 1911 and was baptized as part of her marriage to her new husband.

In 1912, she moved with Widakowich to Argentina, where she conducted ethnological research. With her new husband, she had a daughter, Miriam. Never satisfied with her life in Argentina, Jerusalem traveled to Europe frequently. She died in Buenos Aires in 1943, at the age of 66.

== Selected works ==
- Venus am Kreuz (1899)
- Komödie der Sinn (1902)
- Gebt uns die Wahrheit! (1902)
- Der heilige Skarabäus (1909)
  - The Red House, abridged translation by R. L. Marchant. New York: The Macaulay Company, 1932
  - Red House Alley, complete translation by Stephanie Gorrell Ortega, 2024
- Steinigung in Sakya (1929)
- Die Dreieinigkeit der menschlichen Grundkräfte (1939)
