= Georg Engel =

German literary critic

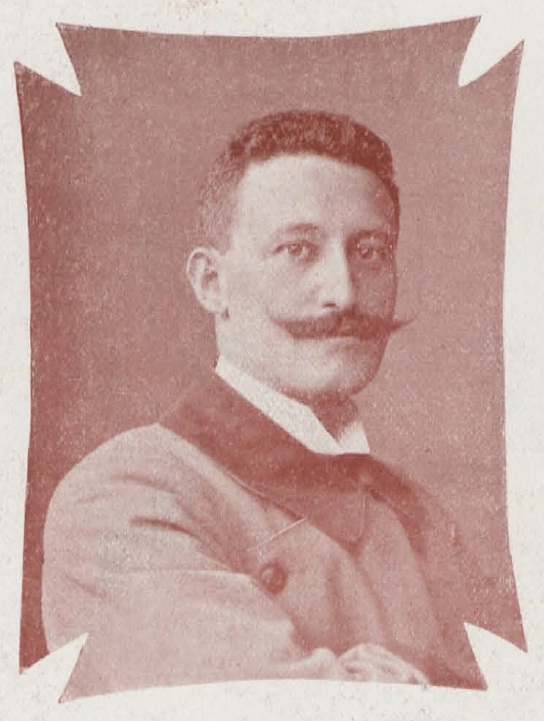
Georg Engel (before 1900)

Georg Julius Leopold Engel (born 22 October 1866 in Greifswald; died 19 October 1931 in Berlin), also known as Johannes Jörgensen, was a German writer, dramatist and literary critic. His novels appeared in large print runs.

== Life ==
Engel spent his youth in Breslau. After studying philosophy and history in Berlin from 1887 to 1890, he worked as an art and theatre critic for the Berliner Tageblatt newspaper and from 1891 he was active as a writer in Berlin.

In his novel Hann Klüth, der Philosoph (1905) and in his collection of novellas Die Leute von Moorluke (1910), set in Greifswald and surrounds, he portrayed lively and life-affirming north German characters. He wrote many dramas, but they are no longer performed. Engel was the President of the Imperial Union of German Literatur (Reichsverband des deutschen Schrifttums). This organisation provided social security for independent authors. He acquired recognition and awards of merit for this.

During the National Socialist period, his work was considered undesirable as Engel was non-Aryan by the state's definition. The commemorative plaque was removed from the house in Greifswald where he was born, his gravestone in Elisenhain (a forest in Greifswald) was knocked over. Some of Engel's books were banned, removed from libraries and burnt. His grave was fixed after 1945.

== Works ==
=== Fiction ===
- "Ahnen und Enkel", 1892
- "Das Nächsten Weib", 1893
- "Blind und andere Novellen", 1894
- Zauberin Circe, 1894
- Die Last, 1898
- Die Furcht vor dem Weibe, 1899
- Hann Klüth, der Philosoph, 1905 (translated into English as "The Philosopher and the Foundling" (1932))
- Der verbotene Rausch, 1909
- Der Reiter auf dem Regenbogen, 1909
- Die Leute von Moorluke, 1910
- Die verirrte Magd, 1911
- Die vier Könige, 1913
- Der Fahnenträger, 1914
- Die Herrin und ihr Knecht, 1917
- Kathrin, 1918
- Claus Störtebeker, 1920
- Die Prinzessin und der Heilige, 1922
- Die Mauer, 1923
- Erlebtes und Erträumtes, 1923
- Die Mauer, 1923
- Die Liebe durch die Luft, 1925
- Uhlenspiegel, 1927
- Des Äthers und der Liebe Wellen, 1929
- Das Gericht, 1931

=== Drama ===
- Der Hexenkessel, 1894
- Hadasa, 1895
- Sturmglocken, 1899
- Der Ausflug in's Sittliche, 1900
- Über den Wassern, 1902
- Jim Hafen, 1906
- Die Hochzeit von Poël, 1906
- Das lachende Mirakel, 1906
- Die heitere Residenz, 1913
- Die Unsichtbaren, 1920
- Die Diplomaten, 1925

=== Films based on his works ===
- The Fear of Women (1921) based on Die Furcht vor dem Weibe
- The Mistress and her Servant (1929) based on Die Herrin und ihr Knecht

== Bibliography ==
- Lutz Mohr: Greifswald-Eldena und das Kloster Hilda. Ein Streifzug und Wegweiser durch die Greifswalder Ortsteile Eldena und Friedrichshagen in Vergangenheit und Gegenwart. Neue Greifswalder Museumshefte, Heft 1/1977, 2. erw. Aufl. Greifswald 1979
- Lutz Mohr: "Ein verfemter Grab- und Gedenkstein in Greifswald (Mecklenburg-Vorpommern)". In: Steinkreuzforschung (SKF). Studien zur deutschen und internationalen Flurdenkmalforschung. ed. by Rainer H. Schmeissner. Reihe B (Sammelbände), Sammelband Nr. 25 (NF 10), Regensburg 1998, p. 83-
