= Folly of Love =

1928 film directed by Robert Wiene

- Directed by: Robert Wiene
- Written by: Alexander Castell (novel); Max Glass
- Produced by: Max Glass
- Starring: Maria Jacobini; Jack Trevor; Betty Astor; Angelo Ferrari
- Cinematography: Giovanni Vitrotti
- Music by: Giuseppe Becce
- Production company: Max Glass Film
- Distributed by: Terra Film
- Release date: 14 November 1928
- Country: Germany
- Languages: Silent; German intertitles

Folly of Love (German: Unfug der Liebe) is a 1928 German silent comedy film directed by Robert Wiene and starring Maria Jacobini, Jack Trevor and Betty Astor. While several of Wiene's previous films had met with mixed responses, Folly of Love was universally praised by critics. The film was made at the Marienfelde Studios of Terra Film. It was Wiene's last silent film. His next work was the 1930 sound film The Other.

== Cast ==
- Maria Jacobini
- Jack Trevor
- Betty Astor
- Angelo Ferrari
- Ferry Silka
- Oreste Bilancia
- Willi Forst
- Reza Sarijlou
- Dan Gillen

== Bibliography ==
- Jung, Uli & Schatzberg, Walter. Beyond Caligari: The Films of Robert Wiene. Berghahn Books, 1999.
