= Dorothea Wieck =

German actress (1908–1986)

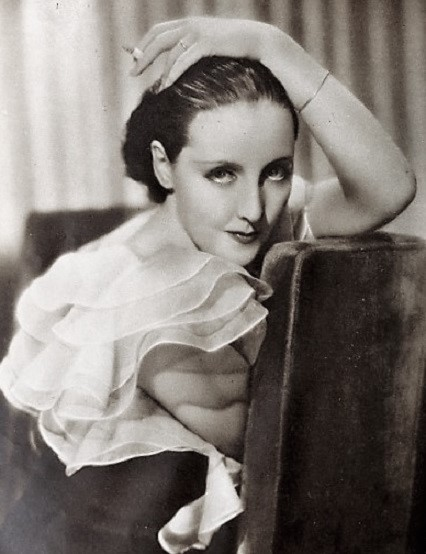
Dorothea Wieck, 1933

Dorothea Wieck, born Dora Bertha Olavia Wieck (3 January 1908 in Davos, Switzerland – 19 February 1986 in Berlin, West Germany), (Note: The Concise Cinegraph: Encyclopaedia of German Cinema lists her date of death as 9 February 1986) was a German theatre and film actress.

== Early years ==
Dorothea Wieck was born Dora Bertha Olavia Wieck and grew up in southern Germany and Sweden. She was descended from musician Clara Schumann.

By the time Wieck was six years old, her father (an artist) and her mother (a musician) felt that she should be an actress. She imitated people who visited their home, and she wrote short plays for her friends and herself. She attended an academy that trained her in music, dancing, and art, but not in acting. When she was 15 years old, she began studying under Max Reinhardt and went to the Josephstaedter Theatre in Vienna, where she began to act.

== Career ==
Wieck launched her acting career on stage in 1924 and made her screen debut in German films in 1926, appearing in several silent films. She became widely known through her leading role in the 1931 film Mädchen in Uniform (Girls in Uniform). Her American film debut came in Cradle Song (1933).

Wieck appeared in around 50 films and played on the stages of many large theatres, notably at the Deutsches Theater and the Schillertheater, Berlin. She also worked as a theatre director. After World War II, she appeared in films only in supporting roles, and she withdrew from films almost entirely in the early 1960s. In 1973, Wieck received the Film Ribbon in Gold of the Deutscher Filmpreis for long and outstanding achievements in German film.

== Personal life and death ==
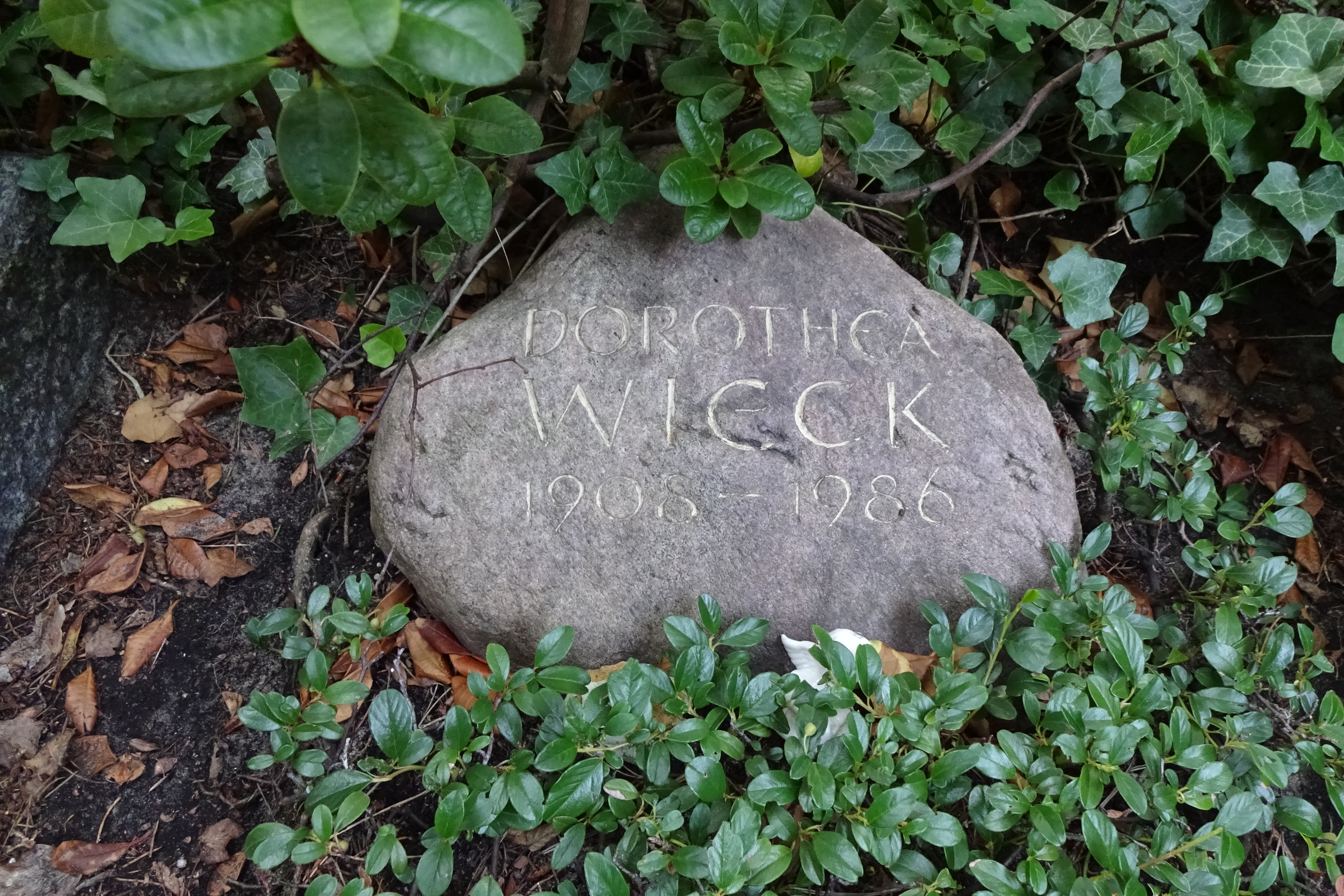
Dorothea Wieck is buried in Friedhof Heerstraße, Berlin-Westend.

From 1932 to 1935, Wieck was married to Baron Ernest von der Decken, a journalist, publisher and writer, "a man of reputed influence in the Nazi regime". During World War II, German Propaganda Minister Joseph Goebbels gave a reception at which Wieck was the guest of honor.

DNB, the German official news agency, erroneously reported in March 1945 that Wieck had been killed in an air attack on Dresden by Allied forces.

She actually died on 19 February 1986 in Berlin, West Germany, aged 78. She is buried at the cemetery Friedhof Heerstraße in Berlin.

== Partial filmography ==
- Secret Sinners (1926)
- I Lost My Heart in Heidelberg (1926, directed by Arthur Bergen) - Klärchen - seine Tochter
- Little Inge and Her Three Fathers (1926) - Inge
- Klettermaxe (1927)
- Valencia (1927, directed by Jaap Speyer) - Nicolessa
- My Heidelberg, I Can Not Forget You (1927, directed by James Bauer) - Klärchen Schröder
- Storm Tide (1927)
- Did You Fall in Love Along the Beautiful Rhine? (1927) - Lieselotte, dessen Pflegeschwester
- The Foreign Legionnaire (1928) - Lore
- Mädchen in Uniform (1931, directed by Leontine Sagan) - Governess Fräulein von Bernburg
- A Mad Idea (1932, directed by Kurt Gerron) - Mabel Miller
- Teilnehmer antwortet nicht (Party Doesn't Answer) (1932, directed by Rudolf Katscher and Marc Sorkin) - Doris
- Countess Mariza (1932) - Gräfin Mariza
- Theodor Körner (1932, directed by Carl Boese) - Toni Adamberger
- Trenck (1932, directed by Heinz Paul and Ernst Neubach) - Amalie, Prinzessin von Preußen
- Anna and Elizabeth (1933, directed by Frank Wisbar) - Elisabeth
- Cradle Song (1933, directed by Mitchell Leisen) - Sister Joanna
- Miss Fane's Baby Is Stolen (1934, directed by Alexander Hall) - Miss Madeline Fane
- Streak of Steel (1935) - Wiggers, Enja
- The Private Life of Louis XIV (1935, directed by Carl Froelich) - Madame de Maintenon
- The Student of Prague (1935, directed by Arthur Robison) - Julia
- The Impossible Woman (1936, directed by Johannes Meyer) - Ileana Manescu
- Love Can Lie (1937) - Sigrid Mallé
- The Yellow Flag (1937, directed by Gerhard Lamprecht) - Krankenschwester Dolores
- The Fourth Is Not Coming (1939) - Dr. med. Irene Andersen
- Dein Leben gehört mir (1939)
- Kopf hoch, Johannes! (1941, directed by Viktor de Kowa)
- Andreas Schlüter (1942, directed by Herbert Maisch) - Kurfürstin
- Special Correspondents (1943) - Lidia Warren
- The Green Salon (1944, directed by Boleslaw Barlog) - Edith Retzlaff, geb. Bütow
- Leb' wohl, Christina (1945) - Julia von Gallas
- The Murder Trial of Doctor Jordan (1949, directed by Erich Engels) - Constanze Jordan
- Five Suspects (1950, directed by Kurt Hoffmann) - Frau Berling
- Das seltsame Leben des Herrn Bruggs (1951, directed by Erich Engel) - Fräulein Holder - Kunstgewerblerin
- No Greater Love (1952, directed by Harald Braun) - Therese von Gobat
- Behind Monastery Walls (1952) - Subpriorin
- Man on a Tightrope (1953, directed by Elia Kazan) - Duchess (uncredited)
- Elephant Fury (1953, directed by Harry Piel) - Hella Thiele
- The Man of My Life (1954) - Schwester Brigitte
- Der Froschkönig (1954) - Fürstin Than
- Das Fräulein von Scuderi (1955) - Frau von Maintenon
- Operation Sleeping Bag (1955) - Frau Gravenhorst
- The Forest House in Tyrol (1955) - Dorothee Attinger, Försterwitwe
- Roman einer Siebzehnjährigen (1955) - Frau Berndorff
- The Story of Anastasia (1956, directed by Falk Harnack) (Note: Anastasia, die letzte Zarentochter (1956) is not to be confused with Anastasia, also from 1956.) - Großherzogin Olga Romanow
- A Time to Love and a Time to Die (1958, directed by Douglas Sirk) - Frau Lieser
- Aus dem Tagebuch eines Frauenarztes (1959) - Sabine Hennemann
- Menschen im Hotel (1959, directed by Gottfried Reinhardt) - Suzanne
- Morgen wirst du um mich weinen (1959) - Äbtissin
- Brainwashed (1960, directed by Gerd Oswald) - Countess (uncredited)
- Das Mädchen und der Staatsanwalt (1962, directed by Jürgen Goslar) - Oberin
