= A Crazy Night =

1927 film directed by Richard Oswald

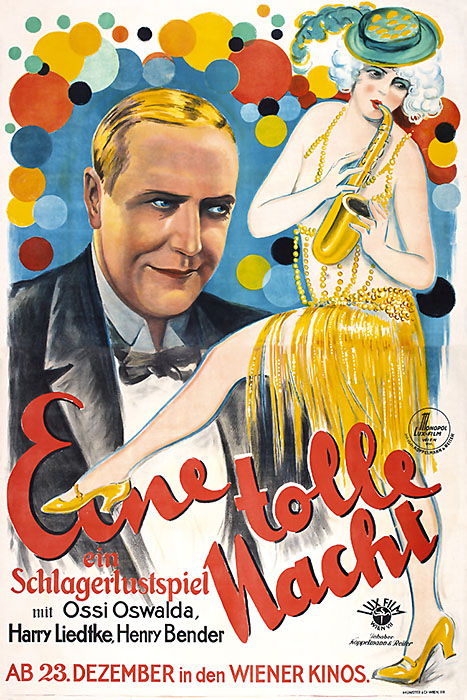
- Directed by: Richard Oswald
- Written by: Julius Freund (play); Wilhelm Mannstaedt (play); Paul Morgan; Richard Oswald
- Produced by: Richard Oswald
- Starring: Ossi Oswalda; Harry Liedtke; Henry Bender
- Cinematography: Otto Kanturek; Edgar S. Ziesemer
- Production company: Richard-Oswald-Produktion
- Distributed by: Deutsch-Nordische Film-Union
- Release date: 21 January 1927
- Running time: 70 minutes
- Country: Germany
- Languages: Silent; German intertitles

A Crazy Night (German: Eine tolle Nacht) is a 1927 German silent comedy film directed by Richard Oswald and starring Ossi Oswalda, Harry Liedtke and Henry Bender. It was shot at the EFA Studios in Berlin. The film's sets were designed by the art director Heinrich Richter.

== Cast ==
- Ossi Oswalda as Margot Olschinsky, Varieté-Tänzerin
- Harry Liedtke as Odoardo Bonaventura, Der Kanonenkönig
- Henry Bender as Florian Pieper, Insektenpulverfabrikant aus Essig an der Gurke
- Mira Hildebrand as Therese, seine Frau
- Ferdinand Bonn as Ruhesanft, Küster an Essig an der Gurke
- Paul Graetz as Pille, Apotheker in Essig an der Gurke
- Maria Forescu as Frau Lindemann aus Essig an der Gurke
- Hedy Waldow as Nellz, Frau Lindemanns Nichte
- Bobbie Bender as Dr. Grednitz, Syndikus in der Scala
- Hermann Picha as Frau Meier, Hebamme
- Kurt Gerron as Wachtmeister Lehmkuhl
- Paul Westermeier as Lattenfritze
- Kurt Lilien as Palisandenkarf
- Hella Kürty as Adelina, eine Privatiere
- Lola Legro as Zofe der Olschinsky
- Wilhelm Bendow as Ein Schuhkünstler
- Otto Kermbach as Ein Musiker

== Bibliography ==
- Bock, Hans-Michael & Bergfelder, Tim. The Concise CineGraph. Encyclopedia of German Cinema. Berghahn Books, 2009. ISBN 978-0-85745-565-9.
