= Elephant Fury =

1943 film directed by Harry Piel

- Directed by: Harry Piel
- Written by: Erwin Biswanger; Erwin Kreker; [lexander Lix; Harry Piel
- Starring: Harry Piel; Hans Zesch-Ballot; Dorothea Wieck
- Cinematography: Willi Peter Block; E.W. Fiedler; Karl Puth; [rich Schmidtke; Klaus von Rautenfeld
- Edited by: Hilde Grebner
- Music by: Werner Bochmann; Fritz Wenneis
- Production companies: Ariel Film; Fabrikation Deutscher Filme
- Distributed by: UFA
- Release date: 13 October 1953
- Running time: 100 minutes
- Country: West Germany
- Language: German

Elephant Fury (German: Gesprengte Gitter) is a 1953 West German drama war film directed by and starring Harry Piel. It also features Herbert A.E. Bohme, Hans Zesch-Ballot and Dorothea Wieck. The film had a troubled production history. Originally made between 1940 and 1943 under the title of Panic, it faced censorship problems. Following the end of the Second World War, Piel recovered the negative which had fallen into the hands of the occupying Soviet forces. He re-shot some scenes, and the film was eventually released more than a decade after it had first begun shooting.

== Synopsis ==
During the Second World War, an air raid on a zoo leads to the animals escaping across the city.

== Cast ==
- Harry Piel as Großtierfänger Peter Volker
- Herbert A.E. Böhme as Mitarbeiter Fritz Kröger
- Hans Zesch-Ballot as Zoodirektor Thiele
- Dorothea Wieck as Hella Thiele
- Wilhelm P. Krüger as Farmer A. R. Brinkmann
- Ruth Eweler as Christa Brinkmann
- Fritz Hoopts as Farmer H. Sander
- Maria Krahn as Farmerin Küppers
- Julius Riedmueller as Affenwärter Alois Leitner
- Julius Frey as Elefantenwärter F. Müller
- L. Krüger-Roger as Raubtierwärter J. Huber
- Beppo Brem as Tiergartenbesucher während eines Fliegerangriffs
- Peter Strunk as Tierwärter Becker
- Karl Hellmer
- Maria Hofen
- Eva Klein-Donath
- Joe Münch-Harris
- Albert Parsen
- Karl-Heinz Peters
- Rudolf Vogel

== Bibliography ==
- Rentschler, Eric. The Ministry of Illusion: Nazi Cinema and Its Afterlife. Harvard University Press, 1996.
