= Valeska Stock =

German actress

- Born: 17 May 1887; Breslau, German Empire
- Died: 7 January 1966 (aged 78); Berlin, Germany
- Occupations: Film actress Stage actress
- Years active: 1922–1949 (film)

Valeska Stock (1887–1966) was a German actress who appeared in around thirty films in supporting roles. Stock originally trained as a ballet dancer in her native Breslau, before moving into theatre and then into the film industry. She played the wife of Paul Wegener's Fabrikant Dreißiger in the 1927 film The Weavers. Her final appearance was a small role in the 1949 East German production Rotation.

== Partial filmography ==
- Der Bekannte Unbekannte (1922) - Magd
- Semi-Silk (1925) - Frau Weber
- Upstairs and Downstairs (1925) - Frau Brenneis
- The Mill at Sanssouci (1926) - seine Frau
- Cab No. 13 (1926) - Mme Coco
- Der Prinz und die Tänzerin (1926)
- The Captain from Koepenick (1926)
- The Prince and the Dancer (1926)
- Poor Little Colombine (1927) - Frau Rabe
- Der Sieg der Jugend (1927) - Jesus Kümmelbackes Frau
- The Weavers (1927) - Frau Dreißiger
- Männer vor der Ehe (1927) - Ihre Mutter, Vermieterin
- The Trial of Donald Westhof (1927)
- Mädchenschicksale (1928) - Die Hebamme
- The Abduction of the Sabine Women (1928) - Frau Professor Gollwitz
- You Walk So Softly (1928) - Mutter Krause
- Miss Midshipman (1929) - Frau Kapitän Strupps
- The Shot in the Sound Film Studio (1930) - Witwe Bollmann
- Dolly Gets Ahead (1930)
- Die lustigen Musikanten (1930) - Frau Selbinger
- Sein Scheidungsgrund (1931)
- Die Koffer des Herrn O.F. (1931)
- You Don't Forget Such a Girl (1932) - Angebe Nebenrolle
- Love Conquers All (1934)
- Artist Love (1935) - Frau Memminger
- The Castle in Flanders (1936) - (uncredited)
- The Muzzle (1938) - Schmitz` Frau
- Five Million Look for an Heir (1938) - Hausbewohnerin (uncredited)
- Schwarzfahrt ins Glück (1938) - Frau Powileit
- Ich verweigere die Aussage (1939) - Frau Stanecke
- Fritze Bollmann wollte angeln (1943) - Gemüsefrau
- Rotation (1949) - Hebamme (final film role)

== Bibliography ==
- Eisner, Lotte H. The Haunted Screen: Expressionism in the German Cinema and the Influence of Max Reinhardt. University of California Press, 2008.
