= Semi-Silk =

1925 film directed by Richard Oswald

- Directed by: Richard Oswald
- Written by: Richard Oswald
- Produced by: Richard Oswald
- Starring: Bernd Aldor; Mary Parker; Valeska Stock
- Cinematography: Emil Schünemann
- Production company: Transatlantische Film
- Distributed by: Deulig-Verleih
- Release date: 26 November 1925
- Country: Germany
- Languages: Silent; German intertitles

Semi-Silk (German: Halbseide) is a 1925 German silent film directed by Richard Oswald and starring Bernd Aldor, Mary Parker and Valeska Stock.

The film's art direction was by Heinrich Richter.

== Cast ==
- Bernd Aldor as Dr. Gonzales / Dr. Ranzau
- Mary Parker as Liane, Frau Gonzales
- Valeska Stock as Frau Weber
- Mary Kid as Kitty
- Bertl Byllardo as Rita, Kittys Tochter
- Karl Beckersachs as Kurt / Arthur von Hiller
- Hans Albers as Alex Bums / Pumm
- Kurt Gerron as Willi Krach, ein Ringer
- Fritz Kampers as Paul Körner / Hart, Ingenieur

== Bibliography ==
- Hans-Michael Bock and Tim Bergfelder. The Concise Cinegraph: An Encyclopedia of German Cinema. Berghahn Books, 2009.
