= Did You Fall in Love Along the Beautiful Rhine? =

1927 film directed by James Bauer

- Directed by: James Bauer
- Written by: Ritter von Eberlein
- Starring: Philipp Manning; Oskar Marion; Dorothea Wieck
- Cinematography: Curt Helling
- Production company: Münchner Lichtspielkunst
- Distributed by: Bavaria Film
- Release date: 7 November 1927
- Country: Germany
- Languages: Silent; German intertitles

Did You Fall in Love Along the Beautiful Rhine? (German: Hast Du geliebt am schönen Rhein?) is a 1927 German silent romance film directed by James Bauer and starring Philipp Manning, Oskar Marion, and Dorothea Wieck.

It was made at the Emelka Studios in Munich. The film's sets were designed by the art director Ludwig Reiber.

== Cast ==
- Philipp Manning as Weingutsbesitzer Günther
- Oskar Marion as Hans Günther, sein Sohn
- Dorothea Wieck as Lieselotte, dessen Pflegeschwester
- Karl Platen as Dr. Birkel
- Georg H. Schnell as Mr. Shiffer, New York
- Wera Engels as Ellen Shiffer, seine Tochter
- Harry Hardt as Mr. Dillon
- Charles Willy Kayser as Reinhold Werner, ein Globetrotter

== Bibliography ==
- Grange, William (2008). Cultural Chronicle of the Weimar Republic. Lanham, MD: Scarecrow Press. ISBN 978-0-8108-5967-8.
