= Once at Midnight =

1929 film

- Directed by: Karl Otto Krause
- Written by: Karl Otto Krause
- Produced by: Karl Otto Krause
- Starring: Betty Astor; Alfons Fryland; Kurt Middendorf
- Cinematography: Marius Holdt
- Production company: Karl Otto Krause-Film
- Distributed by: Karl Otto Krause-Film
- Release date: 14 September 1929
- Country: Germany
- Languages: Silent; German intertitles

Once at Midnight (German: Einmal um Mitternacht) is a 1929 German silent comedy film directed by Karl Otto Krause and starring Betty Astor, Alfons Fryland, and Kurt Middendorf.

== Cast ==
- Betty Astor as Blondine
- Alfons Fryland as Automechaniker und Tenor
- Kurt Middendorf as Impresssario
- Hertha von Walther as Kammersängerin

== Bibliography ==
- Gerhard Lamprecht. Deutsche Stummfilme: 1927–1931.
