= Rags and Silk =

1925 film directed by Richard Oswald

- Directed by: Richard Oswald
- Written by: Heinz Goldberg; Adolf Lantz; Richard Oswald
- Produced by: Richard Oswald
- Starring: Reinhold Schünzel; Mary Parker; Johannes Riemann
- Cinematography: Mutz Greenbaum; Emil Schünemann
- Music by: Hugo Hirsch
- Production company: Richard-Oswald-Produktion
- Release date: 9 January 1925
- Country: Germany
- Languages: Silent; German intertitles

Rags and Silk (German: Lumpen und Seide) is a 1925 German silent comedy film directed by Richard Oswald and starring Reinhold Schünzel, Mary Parker and Johannes Riemann.

The film's sets were designed by the art director Kurt Richter.

== Cast ==
- Reinhold Schünzel Max
- Mary Parker as Irene
- Johannes Riemann as Erik, Irenes Mann
- Einar Hanson as Werner, Eriks Bruder
- Maly Delschaft as Ulrike, Gesellschafterin
- Mary Kid as Hilde, ein Mädchen aus dem Volke
- Ferdinand Bonn as Hildes Vater

== Bibliography ==
- Grange, William. Cultural Chronicle of the Weimar Republic. Scarecrow Press, 2008.
