= Betty Astor =

German actress (1905–1972)

- Born: Berta Baesel; 21 April 1905; Germany
- Died: 1972 (aged 66); Germany
- Other names: Berti Byllardo
- Occupation: Actor
- Years active: 1925-1930

Betty Astor (21 April 1905 – 1972) was a German film actress. She was born Berta Baesel in Germany.

== Selected filmography ==
- Upstairs and Downstairs (1925)
- Should We Be Silent? (1926)
- The Transformation of Dr. Bessel (1927)
- Two Under the Stars (1927)
- The Green Alley (1928)
- Docks of Hamburg (1928)
- Folly of Love (1928)
- Hurrah! I Live! (1928)
- Love in May (1928)
- Who Invented Divorce? (1928)
- Once at Midnight (1929)
- Roses Bloom on the Moorland (1929)
- Masks (1929)
- The Third Confession (1929)
- Oh Those Glorious Old Student Days (1930)
- Gigolo (1930)
- Shooting Festival in Schilda (1931)

== Bibliography ==
- Jung, Uli & Schatzberg, Walter. Beyond Caligari: The Films of Robert Wiene. Berghahn Books, 1999.
