= What Price Love? =

1929 film

- German: Was kostet Liebe?
- Directed by: E. W. Emo
- Written by: Irma von Cube
- Starring: Igo Sym
- Cinematography: László Schäffer
- Music by: Walter Ulfig
- Production company: Strauss-Film
- Distributed by: Strauss-Film
- Release date: 6 April 1929
- Country: Germany
- Languages: Silent; German intertitles

What Price Love? (German: Was kostet Liebe?) is a 1929 German silent film directed by E. W. Emo and starring Igo Sym.

The film's art direction was by József Pán.

== Cast ==
In alphabetical order

- Corry Bell as Celestine
- Max Freiburg as a servant
- Mizzi Griebl
- Leopold Kramer as banker Leblanc
- Hans Melzer as doctor
- H. M. Reinhardt as detective
- Von Stolberg as Latin
- Igo Sym as Lucien
- Hilde von Stolz as Denise
- Richard Waldemar
