= Orient Fever =

1923 film

- Directed by: Edmund Linke
- Produced by: Oskar Linke; Willi Münzenberg
- Production companies: Film-Industrie u. Handels; Orient-Film Linke
- Release date: 1923
- Country: Germany
- Languages: Silent; German intertitles

Orient Fever (German:Orientfieber) is a 1923 German silent film directed by Edmund Linke and starring Bernd Aldor, Friedrich Kühne and Otti Ottera.

== Cast ==
- Bernd Aldor as Reginald Astor
- Friedrich Kühne
- Otti Ottera as Liane, Reginalds Favoritin
