= Let There Be Light (1917 film) =

1917 film directed by Richard Oswald

- Poster for Part 2
- Directed by: Richard Oswald
- Written by: Ewald André Dupont; Richard Oswald; Lupu Pick
- Produced by: Richard Oswald
- Starring: Bernd Aldor; Hugo Flink; Nelly Lagarst
- Cinematography: Max Fassbender
- Production company: Richard-Oswald-Produktion
- Release date: 2 March 1917
- Country: Germany
- Languages: Silent; German intertitles

Let There Be Light (German: Es werde Licht!) is a 1917 German silent drama film directed by Richard Oswald and starring Bernd Aldor, Hugo Flink and Nelly Lagarst. It was followed by three sequels. The film was a protest against Germany's anti-abortion law, and also touched on the dangers of syphilis. It is a lost film.

The film's sets were designed by the art director August Rinaldi. Manfred Noa was employed as an artistic consultant.

== Cast ==
- Bernd Aldor as Georg Mauthner, Arzt
- Hugo Flink as Paul Maunther, Maler, Georgs Bruder
- Nelly Lagarst as Assistantin
- Ernst Ludwig as Stadtrat Kaufherr
- Leontine Kühnberg as Else, dessen Tochter
- Lupu Pick as Dr. Franzius, annoncierender Arzt
- Max Gülstorff as Patient
- Kurt Vespermann as Gerd
- Kathe Oswald as Ingeborg
- Conrad Veidt as Herr Kramer

== Bibliography ==
- Kreimeier, Klaus (1999). The Ufa Story: A History of Germany's Greatest Film Company, 1918–1945. University of California Press. ISBN 978-0-520-22069-0.
