= The Transformation of Dr. Bessel =

1927 film directed by Richard Oswald

- Directed by: Richard Oswald
- Written by: Herbert Juttke; Georg C. Klaren
- Based on: Doktor Bessels Verwandlung by Ludwig Wolff
- Produced by: Richard Oswald
- Starring: Jakob Tiedtke; Sophie Pagay; Hans Stüwe; Agnes Esterhazy
- Cinematography: Axel Graatkjær
- Production company: Richard Oswald-Film
- Release date: 8 December 1927
- Running time: 70 minutes
- Country: Germany
- Languages: Silent; German intertitles

The Transformation of Dr. Bessel (German: Dr. Bessels Verwandlung) is a 1927 German silent film directed by Richard Oswald and starring Jakob Tiedtke, Sophie Pagay and Hans Stüwe. The film was based on a novel by Ludwig Wolff. It premiered at the Ufa-Palast am Zoo. It has thematic similarities with Ernst Lubitsch's 1932 film The Man I Killed. Whereas that film featured a French soldier partially assuming the identity of a dead German, in Oswald's film a German is able to survive by pretending to be French.

The film's sets were designed by the art director Franz Seemann and Bruno Lutz.

== Synopsis ==
During the First World War, a German soldier escapes capture on the battlefield by taking the uniform of a French soldier. He then marries and settles down in Marseille, abandoning any sense of national identity. Due to his language skills he is able to become a major success in international commerce.

== Cast ==
- Jakob Tiedtke as Fabrikant Julius Bessel
- Sophie Pagay as Frau Bessel
- Hans Stüwe as Alexander, ihr Sohn
- Agnes Esterhazy as Helene Bissel, Alexanders Frau
- Gertrud Eysoldt as Frau Pelagie Trouille
- Agnes Petersen-Mozzuchinowa as Germaine, ihre Nichte
- Kurt Gerron as der Grieche Georgakopoulos
- Angelo Ferrari as der Spanier Pedro de Ferrante
- Betty Astor as Karin Lundbye, ein Modell
- Sig Arno as Chevallier, ein französischer Soldat
- Rosa Valetti as Die Wirtin des Hotel garni
- Hella Kürty as Paulette, Hotelstubenmädchen
- Hermann Picha as Ein französischer Buchhändler
- Max Neufeld as Ein französischer Major
- Otto Wallburg as Ein französischer Sergeant
- Curt Bois as Simche Regierer
- Ilka Grüning as Frau Regierer
- Ferdinand Bonn as Oberst Jovan Simonitsch
- Lydia Potechina as Frau Simonitsch
- Hertha von Walther as Eine Miß
- Georg Burghardt as Ein französischer Offizier
- Eva Speyer
- Jaro Fürth
- Hugo Döblin
- Friedrich Kühne
- Harry Nestor

== Bibliography ==
- Hales, Barbara, Petrescu, Mihaela & Weinstein, Valerie. Continuity and Crisis in German Cinema, 1928-1936. Camden House, 2016.
- Rogowski, Christian. The Many Faces of Weimar Cinema: Rediscovering Germany's Filmic Legacy. Camden House, 2010.
