= The Silent Mill =

1914 film directed by Richard Oswald

- Directed by: Richard Oswald
- Written by: Hermann Sudermann (novel); Richard Oswald
- Produced by: Paul Davidson
- Starring: Alfred Abel; Ferdinand Bonn; Robert Valberg
- Production company: Vitascope Film
- Distributed by: PAGU
- Release date: 15 December 1914
- Running time: 66 minutes
- Country: Germany
- Languages: Silent; German intertitles

The Silent Mill or The Story of the Silent Mill (German: Die Geschichte der stillen Mühle) is a 1914 German silent drama film directed by Richard Oswald and starring Alfred Abel, Ferdinand Bonn and Robert Valberg.

The film's sets were designed by the art director Hermann Warm. It was shot at the Tempelhof Studios.

== Cast ==
- Alfred Abel as Johann
- Ferdinand Bonn as Mühlknecht David
- Robert Valberg as Martin
- Leontine Kühnberg as Gertrude - Martin's Frau
- Otto Reinwald
- Friedrich Kühne

== Bibliography ==
- Bock, Hans-Michael & Bergfelder, Tim. The Concise CineGraph. Encyclopedia of German Cinema. Berghahn Books, 2009.
