= Mary Parker (German actress) =

German actress

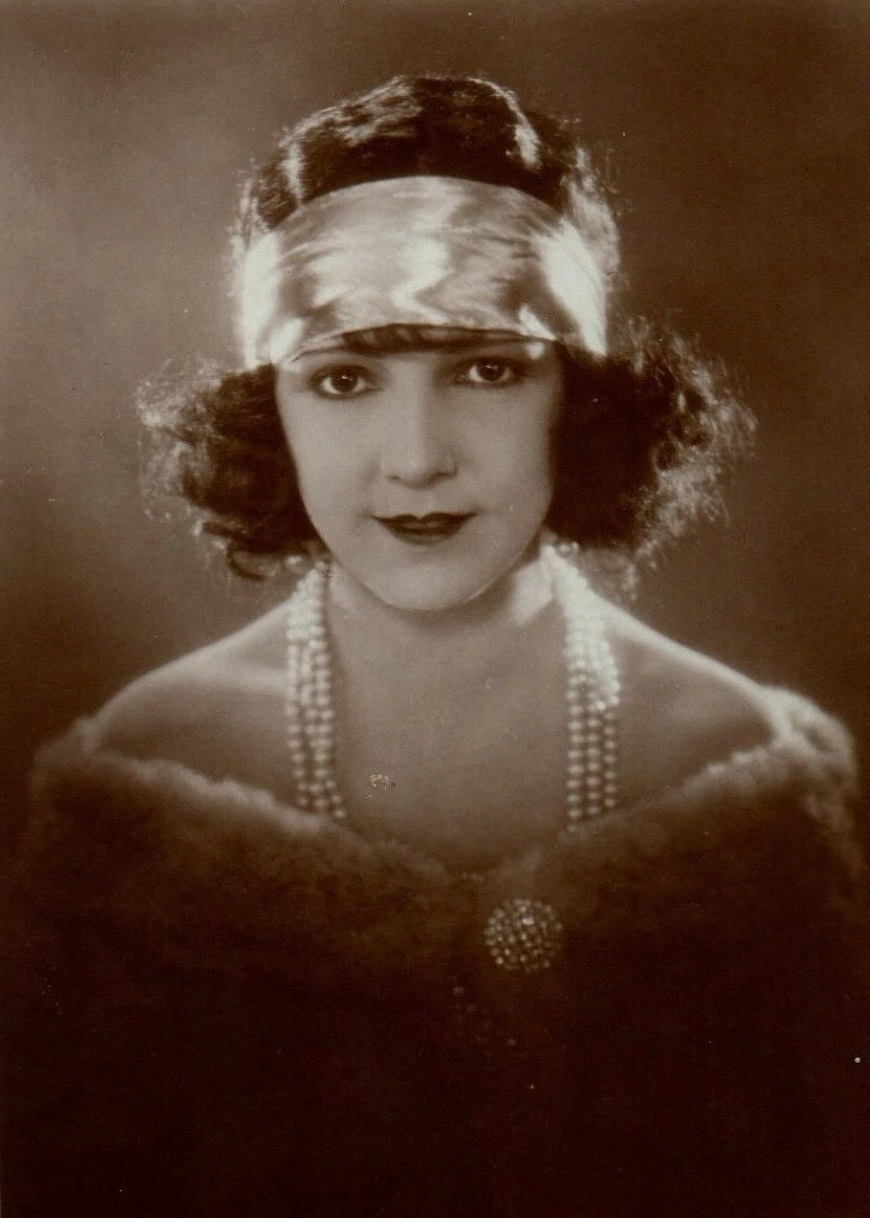
- Born: Magdalena Prohaska; 3 November 1902; Breslau, Silesia, German Empire
- Occupation: Actress
- Years active: 1924-1937 (film)

Mary Parker (born 3 November 1902) was a German film actress active during the silent and early sound eras. She was born in Breslau in Silesia and made her first screen appearance in 1924. She acted in over twenty films in a mixture of leading and supporting roles. In 1932 she appeared in the horror film Uncanny Tales.

== Selected filmography ==
- Battle of the Butterflies (1924)
- The Most Beautiful Woman in the World (1924)
- Struggle for the Soil (1925)
- Semi-Silk (1925)
- Rags and Silk (1925)
- Upstairs and Downstairs (1925)
- Should We Be Silent? (1926)
- I Lost My Heart in Heidelberg (1926)
- The Sweet Girl (1926)
- Suzy Saxophone (1928)
- Today I Was With Frieda (1928)
- Yes, Yes, Women Are My Weakness (1929)
- Miss Midshipman (1929)
- Susanne Cleans Up (1930)
- Uncanny Tales (1932)

== Bibliography ==
- Hans, Anjeana K. Gender and the Uncanny in Films of the Weimar Republic. Wayne State University Press, 2014.
- Schwientek, Sabine. Conrad Veidt, Demon of the Silver Screen: His Life and Works in Context. McFarland, 2023.
