= Robert Wohlmuth =

Austrian film director and screenwriter

- Born: 28 May 1902; Vienna, Austro-Hungarian Empire
- Died: 29 April 1987 (aged 84); Lake Worth, Florida; United States
- Other name: Robert Wilmot
- Occupations: Director, Screenwriter
- Years active: 1927-1945 (film)

Robert Wohlmuth (1902–1987) was an Austrian film director and screenwriter. Following the Anschluss of 1938, Wohlmuth was forced to flee Austria. He went to America where he worked under the name Robert Wilmot.

== Selected filmography ==
=== Director ===
- The Right to Live (1927)
- Love in May (1928)
- When the White Lilacs Bloom Again (1929)
- Ship of Girls (1929)
- The Cabinet of Doctor Larifari (1930) (parodying The Cabinet of Doctor Caligari)
- Fräulein Lilli (1936)

=== Screenwriter ===
- Hollywood and Vine (1945)

== Bibliography ==
- Joshua Parker, Ralph J. Poole. Austria and America: Cross-Cultural Encounters 1865-1933. LIT Verlag Munster, 2014.
