= Ferdinand Bonn =

German actor (1861–1933)

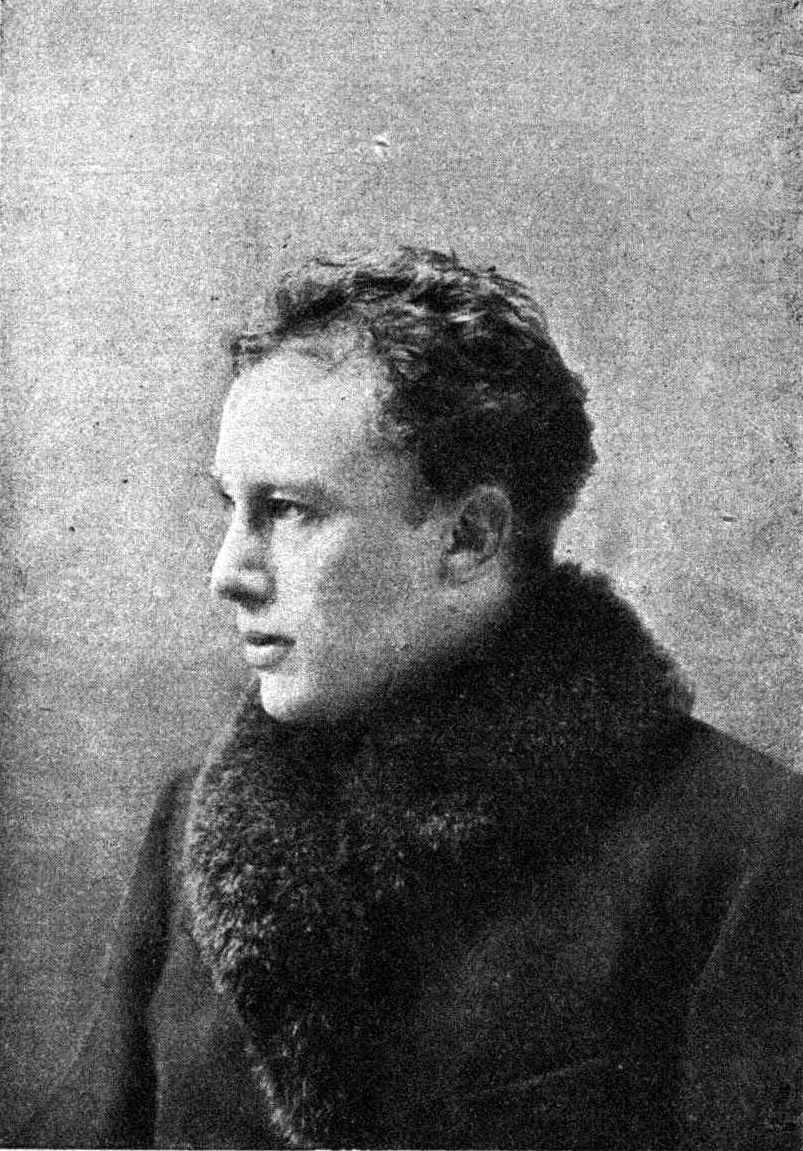
Bonn in 1901

Ferdinand Bonn (20 December 1861 – 24 September 1933) was a German stage and film actor.

Bonn was born in Donauwörth, Kingdom of Bavaria and died at age 71 in Berlin.

== Selected filmography ==
- Svengali (1914)
- The Silent Mill (1914)
- Laugh Bajazzo (1915)
- Robert and Bertram (1915)
- Tales of Hoffmann (1916)
- Professor Erichsons Rivale (1916)
- The Spy (1917)
- The Mexican (1918)
- Prostitution (1919)
- The Moon of Israel (1924)
- The Curse (1924)
- Rags and Silk (1925)
- The Golden Butterfly (1926)
- The Bank Crash of Unter den Linden (1926)
- The Woman in Gold (1926)
- When I Came Back (1926)
- The White Horse Inn (1926)
- The Gypsy Baron (1927)
- The Transformation of Dr. Bessel (1927)
- A Crazy Night (1927)
- Always Be True and Faithful (1927)
- The False Prince (1927)
- You Walk So Softly (1928)
- Strauss Is Playing Today (1928)
- Rasputins Liebesabenteuer (1928)
- Misled Youth (1929)
- The Woman in the Advocate's Gown (1929)
- The Great Longing (1930)
- Danube Waltz (1930)
- Dreyfus (1930)
- A Storm Over Zakopane (1931)
- A Waltz by Strauss (1931)
- In the Employ of the Secret Service (1931)
- Frederica (1932)

== Bibliography ==
- Grange, William. Historical Dictionary of German Theater. Scarecrow Press, 2006.
