= Susanne Cleans Up =

1930 film

- Directed by: Eugen Thiele
- Written by: Eugen Thiele; Wolfgang Wilhelm
- Produced by: Guido Bagier
- Starring: Truus Van Aalten; Francis Lederer; Albert Paulig
- Cinematography: Werner Bohne; Willy Hameister
- Edited by: Alexander Uralsky
- Music by: Artur Guttmann; Leo Leux
- Production company: Tofa-Film
- Distributed by: Fritz Stein-Filmverleih
- Release date: 22 November 1930
- Running time: 80 minutes
- Country: Germany
- Language: German

Susanne Cleans Up (German: Susanne macht Ordnung) is a 1930 musical comedy film directed by Eugen Thiele and starring Truus Van Aalten, Francis Lederer and Albert Paulig. The film's sets were designed by the art director Willi Herrmann.

== Synopsis ==
Susanne Braun is keen to meet her father who she has never seen, but who supports her financially. She visits the Berlin lawyer who oversees the monthly maintenance payments, but he sets her on completely the wrong track. Consequently she encounters several potential fathers.

== Cast ==
- Truus Van Aalten as Susanne Braun
- Francis Lederer as Robert
- Mary Parker as Dolores
- Albert Paulig as Voeller, Firmeninhaber
- Martin Kettner as Bing, Firmeninhaber
- Max Ehrlich as Wasservogel, Prokurist
- S.Z. Sakall as Dr. Fuchs, juristischer Berater
- Maria Hofen as Frau von Dr. Fuchs
- Kurt Lilien as Klingenberg, Freund Dr. Fuchs'
- Senta Söneland as Frau Klingenberg
- Lotte Stein as Frau Bing
- Maria Forescu as Frl. Laron, Pensionats-Vorsteherin
- Irma Godau as Tänzerin Georgette

== Bibliography ==
- Bock, Hans-Michael & Bergfelder, Tim. The Concise Cinegraph: Encyclopaedia of German Cinema. Berghahn Books, 2009.
