= Circumstantial Evidence (1929 German film) =

1929 film

- German: Indizienbeweis
- Directed by: Georg Jacoby
- Written by: Marie Corelli (novel); Stefan Markus
- Produced by: Stefan Markus
- Starring: Fritz Alberti; Ruth Weyher; Valy Arnheim; Henry Edwards
- Cinematography: Hans Karl Gottschalk; Günther Krampf
- Production company: Ama-Film
- Distributed by: Ama-Film (Germany); Williams and Pritchard Films (UK)
- Release date: 15 February 1929
- Country: Germany
- Languages: Silent; German intertitles

Circumstantial Evidence (German: Indizienbeweis) is a 1929 German silent crime film directed by Georg Jacoby and starring Fritz Alberti, Ruth Weyher, Valy Arnheim and Henry Edwards. It is based on the 1886 novel Vendetta by Marie Corelli. Countess Romani grows bored of her life in Corsica and wishes to go elsewhere. It is also known by the alternative title Vendetta. It premiered on 15 February 1929.

== Cast ==
- Ruth Weyher as Countess Romani
- Olaf Fjord as Georges
- Henry Edwards as Count Fabio Romani
- Suzy Vernon as Maria Ferrat
- Inge Landgut as Stella
- Hilde Jennings as Zofe der Gräfin
- Bernd Aldor as alter Diener
- Félix P. Soler as Hassan Salem
- Fritz Alberti as Gerichtspräsident
- Paul Nikolaus as Prosecutor
- Max Neufeld as Defense lawyer
- Otto Kronburger as Kommissar
- Valy Arnheim as Detektiv
- Karl Elzer as Oberkellner
