= Lützow's Wild Hunt (film) =

1927 German silent war film

- Directed by: Richard Oswald
- Written by: Theodor Körner (poem); Max Jungk
- Produced by: Richard Oswald
- Starring: Ernst Rückert; Arthur Wellin; Mary Kid; Paul Bildt
- Cinematography: Ewald Daub
- Music by: Gustav Gold
- Production company: Richard-Oswald Film
- Distributed by: Richard-Oswald Film
- Release date: 21 February 1927
- Running time: 118 minutes
- Country: Germany
- Languages: Silent; German intertitles

Lützow's Wild Hunt (German: Lützows wilde verwegene Jagd) is a 1927 German silent war film directed by Richard Oswald and starring Ernst Rückert, Arthur Wellin and Mary Kid. The film's art direction was by Ernst Stern. It is part of the cycle of Prussian films and portrays the fight of Prussian troops under the command of Ludwig Adolf Wilhelm von Lützow against the French during the Napoleonic Wars, commemorated in the poetry of Theodor Körner.

== Cast ==
- Ernst Rückert as Theodor Körner
- Arthur Wellin as Major von Lützow
- Mary Kid as Toni Adamberger, Schauspielerin am Burgtheater
- Paul Bildt as Napoleon Bonaparte
- Wera Engels as Eleanore Prochaska, ein Bürgermädchen
- Gerd Briese as Friedrich Wilhelm von Seydlitz
- Sig Arno as Franz I of Austria
- Leopold von Ledebur as Johann Wolfgang von Goethe
- Albert Steinrück as Ludwig van Beethoven
- Friedrich Kühne as Klemens von Metternich
- Harry Nestor as Friedrich Wilhelm III, King of Prussia
- Robert Hartberg as Archduke Franz Karl of Austria
- Carl Zickner as Joseph Fouché
- Eduard von Winterstein as Gebhard Leberecht von Blücher
- Paul Marx as Hardenberg
- Eugen Jensen as Freiherr vom Stein
- Josef Karma as Direktor des Burgtheaters
- Hugo Döblin as Burgtheaterfaktotum
- Emil Sondermann as Schmierendirektor
- Theodor Burghardt

== Bibliography ==
- Prawer, S.S. Between Two Worlds: The Jewish Presence in German and Austrian Film, 1910-1933. Berghahn Books, 2005.
