= Unheimliche Geschichten (1932 film) =

German comedy horror film by Richard Oswald

- Directed by: Richard Oswald
- Screenplay by: Heinz Goldberg; Eugen Szatmári
- Produced by: Richard Oswald; G. Pasqual
- Starring: Paul Wegener; Harald Paulsen; Roma Bahn; Mary Parker; Gerhald Bienert
- Cinematography: Heinrich Gärtner
- Edited by: Max Brenner; Friedel Buckow
- Music by: Bert Reisfeld; Rolf Marbot
- Production companies: Roto-Film; G.P. Films
- Release date: 7 September 1932
- Country: Germany

Unheimliche Geschichten (lit. Uncanny Stories), titled The Living Dead in English, is a 1932 German comedy horror film, directed by Richard Oswald, starring Paul Wegener, and produced by Gabriel Pascal. It is a remake of Oswald's 1919 film of the same name.

The story is a merging of three separate short stories, Edgar Allan Poe's "The Black Cat," "The System of Doctor Tarr and Professor Fether" and Robert Louis Stevenson's The Suicide Club, set within a frame story of a reporter's hunt for a mad scientist. It is a black comedy revisiting many of the classic themes of the horror genre. It was Paul Wegener's first talking movie.

== Plot ==
A crazed scientist, Morder (Paul Wegener), driven even crazier by his nagging wife, murders her and walls her up in a basement, à la Poe's "The Black Cat". He then flees as the police and a reporter, Frank Briggs (Harald Paulsen), set out to track him down.

Morder eventually escapes, by pretending to be insane, into an insane asylum. Here, the patients have managed to free themselves, lock up the guards, and take charge (inspired by Poe's "The System of Doctor Tarr and Professor Fether"). After Morder's final escape, he turns up as president of a secret Suicide Club (based on the short story by Stevenson).

== Cast ==
- Paul Wegener
- Maria Koppenhöfer
- Blandine Ebinger
- Eugen Klöpfer
- Harald Paulsen
- Roma Bahn
- Mary Parker
- Paul Henckels
- Gerhard Bienert
- John Gottowt
- Erwin Kalser
- Franz Stein
- Gretel Berndt
- Ilse Fürstenberg
- Carl Heinz Charrell

== Release ==
Unheimliche Geschichten was released in Germany on 7 September 1932. It was released in the United States in 1940 as The Living Dead.

== Reception ==
In contemporary reviews, the German film magazine Film-Kurier praised the performances, specifically that of Paul Wegener and that the film was overall a successful follow-up to the silent version of Unheimliche Geschichten (1919). Variety declared in 1932 that Oswald had "succeeded in creating an effectively gruesome picture", specifically praising the sound, acting and photography as "excellent". In 1940, Bosley Crowther reviewed The Living Dead for The New York Times, declaring it "a nightmare reminder of the old pre-Nazi macabre school of German films, which did all right by such things as M, but apparently had its bad moments, too."

== Footnotes ==
=== References ===
- "Unheimliche Geschichten". Film-Kurier (in German). 8 September 1932 – via Filmportal.de.
- Pitts, Michael R. (2018). Thrills Untapped: Neglected Horror, Science Fiction and Fantasy Films, 1928-1936. McFarland. ISBN 978-1476632896.
- Rigby, Jonathan (2017). Euro Gothic. Signum Books. ISBN 978-0-957-64815-9.
