= Mary Kid =

German actress

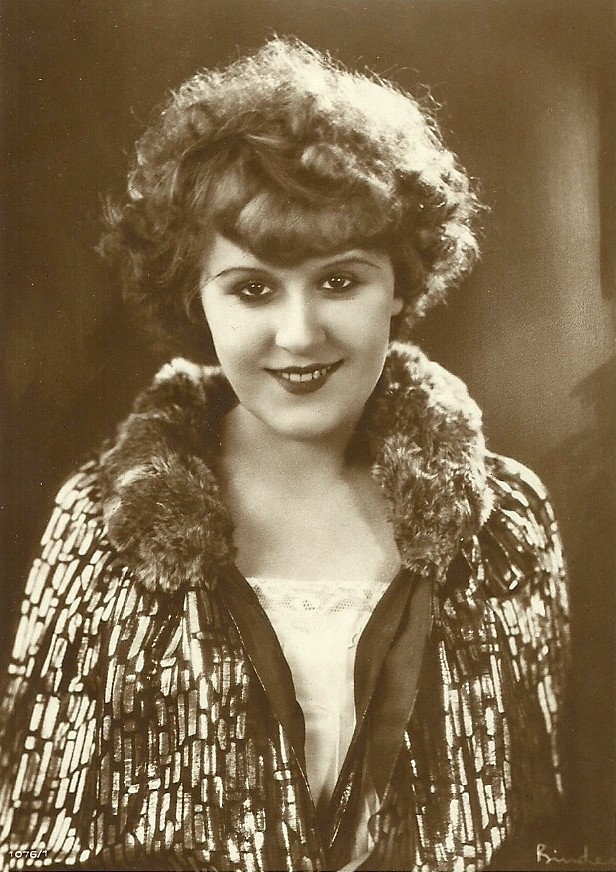
- Mary Kid
- Born: Marie Anna Albertine Keul; 8 August 1901; Hamburg, German Empire
- Died: 29 October 1988 (aged 87); Hamburg, West Germany
- Occupation: Actress
- Years active: 1923 - 1931 (film)

Mary Kid (born Marie Anna Albertine Keul; 8 August 1901 – 29 October 1988) was a German actress. She appeared in more than forty films during the Weimar Republic, but her career came to an end in the early sound era.

== Selected filmography ==
- Harun al Raschid (1924)
- Jealousy (1925)
- Semi-Silk (1925)
- Love and Trumpets (1925)
- Rags and Silk (1925)
- Upstairs and Downstairs (1925)
- Accommodations for Marriage (1926)
- We Belong to the Imperial-Royal Infantry Regiment (1926)
- White Slave Traffic (1926)
- The Glass Boat (1927)
- The Lady with the Tiger Skin (1927)
- Lützow's Wild Hunt (1927)
- The False Prince (1927)
- I Was a Student at Heidelberg (1927)
- Circus Renz (1927)
- The Beloved of His Highness (1928)
- Rasputin (1928)
- Scampolo (1928)
- The Duty to Remain Silent (1928)
- Song (1928)
- The Missing Wife (1929)
- The Mistress and her Servant (1929)
- Lieutenant of His Majesty (1929)
- Diary of a Coquette (1929)
- General Babka (1930)
- The Uncle from Sumatra (1930)
- The Charmer (1931)
- Kennst Du das Land (1931)

== Bibliography ==
- Hardt, Ursula. From Caligari to California: Erich Pommer's Life in the International Film Wars. Berghahn Books, 1996.
