= Madame Récamier (1920 film) =

1920 film directed by Joseph Delmont

- Directed by: Joseph Delmont
- Written by: Hans Gaus
- Produced by: Fern Andra; Georg Bluen
- Starring: Fern Andra; Bernd Aldor; Albert Steinrück
- Cinematography: Emil Schünemann
- Production companies: Fern Andra-Film; Sächsische Kunstfilm
- Release date: 25 October 1920
- Country: Germany
- Languages: Silent; German intertitles

Madame Récamier is a 1920 German silent historical film directed by Joseph Delmont and starring Fern Andra and Bernd Aldor. The film portrays the life of Juliette Récamier, a French society figure of the Napoleonic Era.

== Cast ==
- Fern Andra as Madame Récamier
- Bernd Aldor as Talma
- Albert Steinrück
- Ferdinand von Alten as Napoleon Bonaparte
- Johanna Mund as Joséphine de Beauharnais
- Viktor Senger as Pierre Bernard
- Else Wasa as Marie
- Rudolf Lettinger as Jacques Récamier
- Hermann Böttcher as Fouche
- Adolf E. Licho as Robert
- Emil Rameau as Dufrand
- Walter Formes as Graf Artois
- Doris Schlegel as Blanche
- Boris Michailow as Constand

== Bibliography ==
- Klossner, Michael. The Europe of 1500-1815 on Film and Television: A Worldwide Filmography of Over 2550 Works, 1895 Through 2000. McFarland, 2002.
