= I Lost My Heart in Heidelberg (1926 film) =

1926 film

- Werner Fuetterer and Dorothea Wieck in an advertising postcard for the film
- Directed by: Arthur Bergen
- Written by: Max Ferner
- Starring: Emil Höfer; Gertrud de Lalsky; Werner Fuetterer; Mary Parker
- Cinematography: Franz Koch
- Music by: Hans May
- Production company: Bavaria Film
- Distributed by: Bavaria Film
- Release date: 13 July 1926
- Country: Germany
- Languages: Silent; German intertitles

I Lost My Heart in Heidelberg (German: Ich hab mein Herz in Heidelberg verloren) is a 1926 German silent film directed by Arthur Bergen and starring Emil Höfer, Gertrud de Lalsky and Werner Fuetterer. The title alludes to the popular 1925 song I Lost My Heart in Heidelberg composed by Fred Raymond with lyrics by Fritz Löhner-Beda and Ernst Neubach. The film taps into the nostalgic reputation of Old Heidelberg.

== Cast ==
- Emil Höfer as Pastor Schönhoff
- Gertrud de Lalsky as Sophie, seine Frau
- Werner Fuetterer as Rudolf – sein Sohn
- Mary Parker as Charlotte, seine Tochter
- Sylvester Bauriedl as Fritz Merkelbach – Cand.med. Erstchargierter
- Harry Halm as Alex Winkler, Fuchsmajor
- Karl Platen as Georg Schröder – Corpsdiener
- Dorothea Wieck as Klärchen – seine Tochter
- Viktor Gehring as Ingenieur Frank
- Carla Färber as Trude – Klärchens Freundin
- I.W. Lautsch as Bornschläger
- Maria Meyerhofer as seine Frau
- Josef Eichheim as Schneidermeister Stenglein
- Else Kündinger as seine Frau
- Frau Heuberger-Schönemann as Frau Klinger
- Georg Irmer as Fritz Merkelbach

== Bibliography ==
- Lamb, Andrew. 150 Years of Popular Musical Theatre. Yale University Press, 2000.
