= I Lost My Heart in Heidelberg (song) =

1925 song

"I Lost My Heart in Heidelberg" (German: Ich hab' mein Herz in Heidelberg verloren) is a German song composed in 1925 by Fred Raymond with lyrics by Fritz Löhner-Beda and Ernst Neubach. The song was an immediate popular hit, and in 1927 Raymond included it in a musical of the same name. Two films, released in 1926 and in 1952, take their titles from the song. It remains the theme song of Heidelberg. It was recorded in Britain by the duo Bob and Alf Pearson.

The English-language lyrics used in The Student's Romance (1935) are by Harry S. Pepper.

== Lyrics ==
Es war an einem Abend,
Als ich kaum 20 Jahr',
Da küßt' ich rote Lippen
Und gold'nes, blondes Haar.
Die Nacht war blau und selig,
Der Neckar silberklar,
Da wußte ich, da wußte ich,
Woran, woran ich war:

Refrain:
Ich hab' mein Herz in Heidelberg verloren,
In einer lauen Sommernacht.
Ich war verliebt bis über beide Ohren
Und wie ein Röslein hat ihr Mund gelacht.
Und als wir Abschied nahmen vor den Toren
Beim letzten Kuß, da hab ich's klar erkannt:
Daß ich mein Herz in Heidelberg verloren.
Mein Herz, es schlägt am Neckarstrand.

Und wieder blüht wie damals
Am Neckarstrand der Wein,
Die Jahre sind vergangen,
Und ich bin ganz allein.
Und fragt ihr den Gesellen,
Warum er keine nahm,
Dann sag ich euch, dann sag ich euch,
Ihr Freunde, wie es kam.

Refrain

Was ist aus dir geworden,
Seitdem ich dich verließ,
Alt-Heidelberg, du Feine,
Du deutsches Paradies?
Ich bin von dir gezogen,
Ließ Leichtsinn, Wein und Glück,
Und sehne mich, und sehne mich
Mein Leben lang zurück.

Refrain
