= Heinrich Richter =

German painter and art director

- Born: 23 April 1884; Berlin, German Empire
- Died: 26 January 1981 (aged 96); Berlin, Germany
- Occupations: Painter, Art director
- Years active: 1916–1958 (film)

Heinrich Richter (1884–1981) was a German painter and art director. He designed the sets for more than a hundred films during his career.

== Selected filmography ==
- The Confessions of the Green Mask (1916)
- Uriel Acosta (1920)
- The Sensational Trial (1923)
- Upstairs and Downstairs (1925)
- Semi-Silk (1925)
- Should We Be Silent? (1926)
- A Crazy Night (1927)
- One Plus One Equals Three (1927)
- Children's Souls Accuse You (1927)
- The Trousers (1927)
- The Girl with the Five Zeros (1927)
- When the Guard Marches (1928)
- The Prince of Rogues (1928)
- The House Without Men (1928)
- Master and Mistress (1928)
- Villa Falconieri (1928)
- Sinful and Sweet (1929)
- The Man Without Love (1929)
- The Call of the North (1929)
- Daughter of the Regiment (1929)
- Come Back, All Is Forgiven (1929)
- Mischievous Miss (1930)
- The Jumping Jack (1930)
- Morals at Midnight (1930)
- The Man Who Murdered (1931)
- The Murderer Dimitri Karamazov (1931)
- A Woman Branded (1931)
- Durand Versus Durand (1931)
- The Schlemihl (1931)
- Who Takes Love Seriously? (1931)
- Two in a Car (1932)
- The Eleven Schill Officers (1932)
- Death Over Shanghai (1932)
- For Once I'd Like to Have No Troubles (1932)
- Cavaliers of the Kurfürstendamm (1932)
- The Sporck Battalion (1934)
- Every Day Isn't Sunday (1935)
- The Schimeck Family (1935)
- The Man with the Paw (1935)
- Fruit in the Neighbour's Garden (1935)
- The Adventurer of Paris (1936)
- Thunder, Lightning and Sunshine (1936)
- The Man Who Couldn't Say No (1938)
- Little County Court (1938)
- The Unfaithful Eckehart (1940)
- Passion (1940)
- Lightning Around Barbara (1941)

== Bibliography ==
- Soister, John T. Conrad Veidt on Screen: A Comprehensive Illustrated Filmography. McFarland, 2002.
