= Hugo Döblin =

German actor (1876–1960)

- Born: Hugo Emil Döblin; 29 October 1876; Stettin, Pomerania, German Empire
- Died: 4 November 1960 (aged 84); Zürich, Switzerland
- Occupation: Actor
- Years active: 1914–1949 (film)
- Relatives: Alfred Döblin (brother)

Hugo Döblin (29 October 1876 – 4 November 1960) was a German stage and film actor. He appeared in more than eighty films, most of them during the silent era. The Jewish Döblin left Germany following the Nazi Party's rise to power in 1933, and after moving first to Czechoslovakia and Austria, eventually settled in Switzerland. His younger brother was novelist, essayist, and doctor Alfred Döblin (1878–1957).

== Selected filmography ==
- Hearts are Trumps (1920)
- From Morn to Midnight (1920)
- Burning Country (1921)
- Seafaring Is Necessary (1921)
- Danton (1921)
- The House on the Moon (1921)
- The Oath of Stephan Huller (1921)
- Lady Hamilton (1921)
- Lola Montez, the King's Dancer (1922)
- The Big Shot (1922)
- Lucrezia Borgia (1922)
- The False Dimitri (1922)
- Your Valet (1922)
- The Lady and Her Hairdresser (1922)
- Die Gezeichneten (1922)
- A Glass of Water (1923)
- A Woman, an Animal, a Diamond (1923)
- Nanon (1924)
- Darling of the King (1924)
- The Game of Love (1924)
- Debit and Credit (1924)
- One Minute to Twelve (1925)
- The Venus of Montmartre (1925)
- The Telephone Operator (1925)
- The Girl with a Patron (1925)
- The Wife of Forty Years (1925)
- Only a Dancing Girl (1926)
- The Blue Danube (1926)
- The Transformation of Dr. Bessel (1927)
- The Strange Case of Captain Ramper (1927)
- Night of Mystery (1927)
- The Convicted (1927)
- The Lorelei (1927)
- My Aunt, Your Aunt (1927)
- Lützow's Wild Hunt (1927)
- Give Me Life (1928)
- The Lady and the Chauffeur (1928)
- Anastasia, the False Czar's Daughter (1928)
- The Woman in the Advocate's Gown (1929)
- What a Woman Dreams of in Springtime (1929)
- The Crimson Circle (1929)
- The White Devil (1930)
- Him or Me (1930)
- By a Nose (1931)
- The Theft of the Mona Lisa (1931)
- An Auto and No Money (1932)
- A Blonde Dream (1932)
- Madness Rules (1949)
