= Richard Oswald =

Austrian film director (1880–1963)

- Film Director
- Born: Richard W. Ornstein; 5 November 1880; Vienna, Austria-Hungary
- Died: 11 September 1963 (aged 82); Düsseldorf, West Germany
- Occupation: Film director

Richard Oswald (5 November 1880 – 11 September 1963) was an Austrian film director, producer, screenwriter, and father of German-American film director Gerd Oswald.

== Early life and career ==
Richard Oswald, born in Vienna as Richard W. Ornstein, began his career as an actor on the Viennese stage. He made his film directorial debut at age 34 with The Iron Cross (1914) and worked a number of times for Jules Greenbaum. In 1916, Oswald set up his own production company in Germany, writing and directing most of his films himself. His pre-1920 efforts include such literary adaptations as The Picture of Dorian Gray (1917), Peer Gynt (1919), the once scandalous Different from the Others (1919) and Around the World in Eighty Days (1919). Oswald directed nearly 100 films.

Some critics have suggested that Oswald was more prolific than talented, but such films as his horror film Unheimliche Geschichten (1932), produced by no less than Gabriel Pascal, would seem to refute this claim as it is viewed by some to be a forgotten classic.

He made a significant number of operetta films during his career.

== Exile ==
Being Jewish, Oswald was forced to flee Nazi Germany, first for occupied France and later emigrating to the United States. His last production was The Lovable Cheat (1949), an inexpensive adaptation of a Balzac story which boasted a cast including Charles Ruggles, Alan Mowbray, and Buster Keaton. Oswald later returned to Germany following the end of the Second World War and died in Düsseldorf, West Germany in 1963.

== Partial filmography ==
- The Iron Cross (1914)
- Ivan Koschula (1914)
- The Silent Mill (1914)
- Laugh Bajazzo (1915)
- The Vice (1915)
- Tales of Hoffmann (1916)
- A Night of Horror (1916)
- The Uncanny House (1916)
- The Lord of Hohenstein (1917)
- Let There Be Light (1917)
- The Picture of Dorian Gray (1917)
- The Sea Battle (1917)
- The Story of Dida Ibsen (1918)
- Diary of a Lost Woman (1918)
- Peer Gynt (1919)
- Prostitution (1919)
- Different from the Others (1919)
- Unheimliche Geschichten
- Around the World in Eighty Days (1919)
- Figures of the Night (1920)
- Kurfürstendamm (1920)
- Lady Hamilton (1921)
- The Love Affairs of Hector Dalmore (1921)
- The House in Dragon Street (1921)
- The Golden Plague (1921)
- Lucrezia Borgia (1922)
- The Lady and Her Hairdresser (1922)
- The Lodging House for Gentleman (1922)
- Earth Spirit (1923)
- Carlos and Elisabeth (1924)
- Rags and Silk (1925)
- Upstairs and Downstairs (1925)
- The Wife of Forty Years (1925)
- Semi-Silk (1925)
- We Belong to the Imperial-Royal Infantry Regiment (1926)
- The White Horse Inn (1926)
- When I Came Back (1926)
- Radio Magic (1927)
- Assassination (1927)
- Lützow's Wild Hunt (1927)
- A Crazy Night (1927)
- The Transformation of Dr. Bessel (1927)
- The Green Alley (1928)
- Spring Awakening (1929)
- Marriage in Trouble (1929)
- The Mistress and her Servant (1929)
- Cagliostro (1929)
- The Hound of the Baskervilles (1929)
- Dreyfus (1930)
- Alraune (1930)
- The Tender Relatives (1930)
- Poor as a Church Mouse (1931)
- Schubert's Dream of Spring (1931)
- 1914 (1931)
- Victoria and Her Hussar (1931)
- The Captain from Köpenick (1931)
- Countess Mariza (1932)
- Unheimliche Geschichten (1932)
- Die Blume von Hawaii (1933)
- A Song Goes Round the World (1933)
- Adventures on the Lido (1933)
- Honour Among Thieves (1933)
- Wenn du jung bist, gehört dir die Welt (1934)
- Bleeke Bet (1934)
- Storm Over Asia (1938)
- Isle of Missing Men (1942)
- The Captain from Köpenick (1945), aka I Was a Criminal
- The Lovable Cheat (1949)
