= List of German films of 1895–1918 =

This is a list of the most notable films produced in the German Empire until 1918, in year order.

It includes German films from the introduction of the medium to the resignation of the Emperor at the end of World War I. Many of these films laid the groundwork for German Expressionism.

For an alphabetical list of articles on films of the period see Category:Films of the German Empire.

== 1890s ==
Title	Director	Cast	Genre	Notes
1895
Akrobatisches Potpourri	Max & Emil Skladanowsky	Grunato family	Documentary	Release: Nov. 1
Bauerntanz zweier Kinder	Max Skladanowsky		Documentary	Release: Nov 1
Boxing Kangaroo	Max Skladanowsky	Mr Delaware	Documentary	Release: Nov 1
The German Emperor Reviewing His Troops	Birt Acres			Earliest known footage of Kaiser Wilhelm
Opening of the Kiel Canal	Birt Acres			Early footage of Kaiser Wilhelm
Serpentinen Tanz	Max Skladanowsky		Documentary	Release: Nov 1
1896
Leben und Treiben am Alexanderplatz	Max Skladanowsky			
1897
Apotheose II	Max Skladanowsky			
1898
Kaiser von Deutschland, der Kaiser von Österreich und der König von Sachsen am Tage der Jubiläumsfeier in Dresden				English: The Kaiser of Germany, the Kaiser of Austria and the King of Saxony on the day of the Jubilee Fair in Dresden
1899
German Lancers				A parade of the famous Second Guards, one of Emperor William's favorite regiments.
When the Bugle Sounds 'Charge'				An attack by the famous Second Guards Regiment of Emperor William's Army on the Paradefeld.

== 1900s ==
Title	Director	Cast	Genre	Notes
1900
Einzug unserer Chinakrieger in Berlin am 16.12.1900				English: The Entry of Our China Soldiers in Berlin on Dec. 16, 1900 (about Boxer Rebellion?)
Eine moderne Jungfrau von Orleans	Max Skladanowsky			English: A Modern Maid of Orleans
1901
Einzug der Königin von Holland mit ihrem Gemahl in Schwerin				English: The Entry of the Queen of The Netherlands with her Consort in Schwerin
1902
When Knighthood Was in Flower				
1903
Mr. Krebs in seiner senationellen Schleifenfahrt	Arthur Robison			English: Mr. Krebs in his Sensational Bicycleride
Der lustige Ehemann	Otto Julius Bierbaum			
1904
The Whistling Bowery Boy	Oskar Messter			
Kämpfe vor Port Arthur				English: The Campaign for Port Arthur
1905
Eine Fliegenjagd oder Die Rache der Frau Schultze	Max Skladanowsky			English: Hunting a Fly; Or, The Revenge of Frau Schultze
Afrikanische Kriegsbilder			War documentary	English: African War Pictures
1906
Apachentanz	Oskar Messter, Albert Kutzner	Henny Porten, Rosa Porten		English: Apache Dance (A French dance)
Meißner Porzellan	Franz Porten, Oskar Messter	Henny Porten, Rosa Porten		
1909
Prosit Neujahr 1910!	Guido Seeber		Animated film	First animated German film

== 1910-1912 ==
Title	Director	Cast	Genre	Notes
1910
Arsène Lupin contra Sherlock Holmes	Viggo Larsen	Viggo Larsen, Paul Otto	Crime	5 part serial
Die geheimnisvolle Streichholzdose	Guido Seeber		Animated film	Available online here
Sumurûn	Max Reinhardt			
1911
Gipsy Blood	Urban Gad	Asta Nielsen	Drama	a.k.a. Heißes Blut
Das Liebesglück der Blinden	Curt A. Stark, Heinrich Bolten-Baeckers	Henny Porten	Drama	English: The Love of a Blind Girl or The Happy Love of a Blind Girl
Den sorte drøm	Urban Gad	Asta Nielsen	Drama	a.k.a. Der schwarze Traum. German-Danish co-production
Die Suppe	Julius Pinschewer		partly animated film	An advertisement for Maggi-Wuerze Available online here
The Traitress	Urban Gad	Asta Nielsen, Max Obal, Robert Valberg	Drama	
1912
The Dance of Death	Urban Gad	Asta Nielsen	Drama	
In Nacht und Eis	Mime Misu		Disaster	English: In Night and Ice; first German Titanic film ever made
Das Mirakel	Mime Misu			
Der Nähkasten	Julius Pinschewer		animated film	
The Oath of Stephan Huller	Viggo Larsen	Viggo Larsen, Wanda Treumann	Drama	
Poor Jenny	Urban Gad	Asta Nielsen	Drama	
Der Schatten des Meeres	Curt A. Stark	Henny Porten	Drama	English: In the Shadow of the Sea
Tanz der Flaschen (Kupferberg Gold)	Julius Pinschewer		animated film	
Tanz der Flaschen (Maggi)	Julius Pinschewer		animated film	An advertisement for Maggi-Wuerze
Zweimal gelebt	Max Mack	Eva Speyer, Anton Ernst Rückert	Drama	

== 1913 ==
Title	Director	Cast	Genre	Notes
Der Film von der Königin Luise	Franz Porten	Hansi Arnstaedt	biopic	English: A Film of Queen Louise; in 3 parts
Die Insel der Seligen	Max Reinhardt	Ernst Hofmann, Willy Prager, Wilhelm Diegelmann, Leopoldine Konstantin	Fantasy	
The Life and Works of Richard Wagner	Carl Froelich; William Wauer	Giuseppe Becce, Olga Engl	biopic	
Der neue Schreibtisch	Karl Valentin	Karl Valentin	Comedy	
The Other	Max Mack	Albert Bassermann	Thriller	
Das rosa Pantöffelchen	Franz Hofer	Dorrit Weixler	Comedy	English: The Pink Slippers
Der Steckbrief	Franz Hofer	Paul Meffert, Maria Forescu		
The Student of Prague	Stellan Rye, Paul Wegener	Paul Wegener	Horror	English: A Bargain With Satan
The Weapons of Youth	Friedrich Müller	Gertrud Gräbner, Conrad Wiene		Screenplay by Robert Wiene
Where Is Coletti?	Max Mack	Hans Junkermann, Madge Lessing, Heinrich Peer	Comedy	

== 1914 ==
Title	Director	Cast	Genre	Notes
The Armoured Vault	Joe May	Ernst Reicher, Hermann Picha, Fritz Richard	Thriller	
Detektiv Braun	Rudolf Meinert	Alwin Neuß, Friedrich Kühne	Crime	
The Firm Gets Married	Carl Wilhelm	Victor Arnold, Ernst Lubitsch	Comedy	
Die geheimnisvolle Villa	Joe May	Ernst Reicher, Werner Krauss		
He This Way, She That Way	Robert Wiene	Max Zilzer, Manny Ziener	Comedy	
Der Hund von Baskerville	Rudolf Meinert	Alwin Neuß, Friedrich Kühne	Crime	
The Iron Cross	Richard Oswald	Friedrich Kühne, Hedda Vernon, Hanni Weisse	Drama	
Ivan Koschula	Richard Oswald	Rudolph Schildkraut, Hanni Weisse	Drama	
Little Angel	Urban Gad	Asta Nielsen	Comedy	
The Man in the Cellar	Joe May	Ernst Reicher, Max Landa, Olga Engl	Thriller	
Miss Piccolo	Franz Hofer	Dorrit Weixler, Ernst Lubitsch, Alice Hechy	Comedy	
The Silent Mill	Richard Oswald	Alfred Abel, Ferdinand Bonn, Robert Valberg	Drama	
Eine venezianische Nacht	Max Reinhardt	Alfred Abel, Maria Carmi	Fantasy	

== 1915 ==
Title	Director	Cast	Genre	Notes
Aufs Eis geführt	Ernst Lubitsch	Ernst Lubitsch, Albert Paulig	Comedy	
Berlin im Kriegsjahr	Carl Wilhelm		documentary	
The Canned Bride	Robert Wiene	Margarete Kupfer, Guido Herzfeld	Comedy	
The Dancer	Georg Jacoby	Leopoldine Konstantin, Bruno Kastner	Drama	
Deutsche Kriegswoche	Carl Wilhelm		documentary	
Fluch der Schönheit	D.J. Rector	Maria Carmi, Hans Mierendorff	Drama	
Der Golem	Henrik Galeen, Paul Wegener	Paul Wegener	Horror	
Ein Held des Unterseebootes	Walter Schmidthässler		documentary	
Laugh Bajazzo	Richard Oswald	Rudolph Schildkraut, Alfred Abel, Hanni Weisse	Drama	
No Sin on the Alpine Pastures	Rudolf Biebrach	Henny Porten, Emmy Wyda, Lupu Pick	Comedy	
Photographischer Wettbewerb			documentary	
Robert and Bertram	Max Mack	Eugen Burg, Ferdinand Bonn	Comedy	
The Tunnel	William Wauer	Friedrich Kayßler, Fritzi Massary	Science fiction	
The Vice	Richard Oswald	Alfred Abel, Rosa Valetti, Arthur Wellin	Drama	
Der Zahnteufel	Julius Pinschewer		partly animated film	An advertisement for Beiersdorfer Available online here
Zucker und Zimt	Ernst Lubitsch	Ernst Matray, Alice Hechy	Comedy	

== 1916 ==
Title	Director	Cast	Genre	Notes
Bogdan Stimoff	Georg Jacoby	Carl Goetz, Georg Reimers	Drama	Co-production with Austria and Bulgaria
The Confessions of the Green Mask	Max Mack	Alfred Abel, Reinhold Schünzel	Drama	
Doktor Satansohn	Edmund Edel	Hans Felix, Marga Kohler, Ernst Lubitsch	Comedy	
Frau Eva	Robert Wiene	Erna Morena, Emil Jannings	Drama	
His Coquettish Wife	Hubert Moest	Hedda Vernon, Erich Kaiser-Titz, Reinhold Schünzel	Comedy	
Homunculus	Otto Rippert	Olaf Fønss	Science fiction	6 part serial
The Knitting Needles	Hubert Moest, Otto Rippert	Erich Kaiser-Titz, Käthe Haack, Olga Engl	Comedy	
Lehmann's Honeymoon	Robert Wiene	Guido Herzfeld, Arnold Rieck	Comedy	
Leutnant auf Befehl	Ernst Lubitsch	Harry Liedtke, Max Gulstorff, Ossi Oswalda	Drama	
Die Peitsche	Adolf Gartner	Ernst Reicher	Drama	
The Queen's Love Letter	Robert Wiene	Henny Porten, Arthur Schröder	Comedy	
The Queen's Secretary	Robert Wiene	Käthe Dorsch, Ressel Orla	Comedy	
The Robber Bride	Robert Wiene	Henny Porten, Friedrich Feher	Comedy	
Rose on the Heath	Franz Hofer	Lya Ley, Fritz Achterberg	Drama	
Rübezahl's Wedding	Rochus Gliese, Paul Wegener	Paul Wegener, Lyda Salmonova	Drama	
Shoe Palace Pinkus	Ernst Lubitsch	Ernst Lubitsch, Guido Herzfeld	Comedy	
The Sin of Helga Arndt	Joe May	Mia May, Frida Richard	Drama	
Ein Tag bei der Armee Boehm-Ermolli			documentary	
Tyrannenherrschaft – Aus Polens schwerer Zeit	Franz Porten			English: Tyrannical Overlords – From Poland's Dark Time
The Uncanny House	Richard Oswald	Werner Krauss, Reinhold Schünzel, Lupu Pick	Mystery	Released in three parts
Under the Spell of Silence	Hanna Henning	Reinhold Schünzel, Olga Engl	Drama	
Vengeance Is Mine	Rudolf Meinert	Hans Mierendorff, Marie von Buelow	Crime	
The Wandering Light	Robert Wiene	Henny Porten, Bruno Decarli	Drama	
Werner Krafft	Carl Froelich	Eduard von Winterstein, Erika Glässner, Reinhold Schünzel	Drama	
The Yogi	Paul Wegener, Rochus Gliese	Paul Wegener, Lyda Salmonova	Drama	

== 1917 ==
Title	Director	Cast	Genre	Notes
Badeleben im dritten Kriegsjahr an der Ostsee	William Karfiol		documentary	
Berliner Leben im dritten Kriegsjahr Frühling 1917			documentary	
Ein Boxkampf mit John Bull	Julius Pinschewer		Animated propaganda film	Available online here
The Diamond Foundation	Johannes Guter	Ernst Reicher, Marija Leiko, Frida Richard	Crime	
Dornröschen	Paul Leni	Mabel Kaul, Harry Liedtke, Käthe Dorsch	Fairy tale	
Dr. Hart's Diary	Paul Leni	Heinrich Schroth, Käthe Haack	War	
Fear	Robert Wiene	Bruno Decarli, Conrad Veidt	Horror	
Das fidele Gefängnis	Ernst Lubitsch	Harry Liedtke, Emil Jannings	Comedy	English: The Merry Jail
Frank Hansen's Fortune	Viggo Larsen	Viggo Larsen, Lupu Pick	Western	
Germany and Its Armies Today			documentary	Compilation of war films edited together for export
The Giant's Fist	Rudolf Biebrach	Henny Porten, Johannes Riemann	Drama	
Hans Trutz in the Land of Plenty	Paul Wegener	Paul Wegener, Lyda Salmonova, Ernst Lubitsch	Fantasy	
Hilde Warren und der Tod	Joe May	Written by and starring Fritz Lang		
Imprisoned Soul	Rudolf Biebrach	Henny Porten, Paul Bildt	Drama	
Jan Vermeulen, the Miller of Flanders	Georg Jacoby	Fred Immler, Leo Lasko	War	
John Bull	Julius Pinschewer		Animated propaganda film	Available online here
Let There Be Light	Richard Oswald	Bernd Aldor, Hugo Flink	Drama	Followed by three other parts
Life Is a Dream	Robert Wiene	Emil Jannings, Bruno Decarli	Drama	
The Lord of Hohenstein	Richard Oswald	Bernd Aldor, Rita Clermont, Lupu Pick	Drama	
The Lost Paradise	Bruno Rahn	Mady Christians, Erich Kaiser-Titz	Drama	
The Love of Hetty Raimond	Joe May	Mia May, Bruno Decarli, Heinrich Peer	Drama	
Die Marokkodeutschen in der Gewalt der Franzosen	Waldemar Hecker		documentary	
The Man in the Mirror	Robert Wiene	Maria Fein, Bruno Decarli	Drama	
The Marriage of Luise Rohrbach	Rudolf Biebrach	Henny Porten, Emil Jannings	Drama	
Mountain Air	Rudolf Biebrach	Henny Porten, Paul Hartmann, Reinhold Schünzel	Comedy	
The Onyx Head	Joe May	Max Landa, Leopoldine Konstantin	Crime	
The Path of Death	Robert Reinert	Maria Carmi, Carl de Vogt, Conrad Veidt	Drama	
The Picture of Dorian Gray	Richard Oswald	Bernd Aldor	Drama	
The Princess of Neutralia	Rudolf Biebrach	Henny Porten, Paul Bildt	Comedy	
The Ring of Giuditta Foscari	Alfred Halm	Emil Jannings, Harry Liedtke, Erna Morena	Drama	
Das Säugetier	Robert L. Leonard		Animated propaganda film	Available online here
The Sea Battle	Richard Oswald	Emil Jannings, Werner Krauss, Conrad Veidt	War	
The Spy	Karl Heiland	Ferdinand Bonn, Ellen Richter, Conrad Veidt	Spy drama	
Steadfast Benjamin	Robert Wiene	Arnold Rieck, Guido Herzfeld	Comedy	
Unusable	Georg Jacoby	Adele Sandrock, Grete Diercks	Drama	
Wedding in the Eccentric Club	Joe May	Harry Liedtke, Kathe Haack, Bruno Kastner	Drama	
When Four Do the Same	Ernst Lubitsch	Ossi Oswalda, Emil Jannings	Comedy/Drama	
When the Dead Speak	Robert Reinert	Maria Carmi, Carl de Vogt, Conrad Veidt	Drama	
When the Heart Burns with Hate	Kurt Matull	Pola Negri, Hans Adalbert Schlettow	Drama	

== 1918 ==
Title	Director	Cast	Genre	Notes
The Adventure of a Ball Night	Viggo Larsen	Gertrude Welcker, Paul Bildt, Paul Biensfeldt	Adventure	
Agnes Arnau and Her Three Suitors	Rudolf Biebrach	Henny Porten, Hermann Thimig, Kurt Ehrle	Comedy	
Alraune, die Henkerstochter, genannt die rote Hanne	Eugen Illés, Joseph Klein			
Die Augen der Mumie Ma	Ernst Lubitsch			
The Ballet Girl	Ernst Lubitsch	Ossi Oswalda, Harry Liedtke, Margarete Kupfer	Comedy	
The Beggar Countess	Joe May, Bruno Ziener	Mia May, Heinrich Peer, Johannes Riemann	Drama	
The Blue Lantern	Rudolf Biebrach	Henny Porten, Ferdinand von Alten	Drama	
Bukarest im dritten Kriegsjahr			documentary	
Carmen	Ernst Lubitsch	Pola Negri, Harry Liedtke	Drama	aka Gypsy Blood
Colomba	Arzén von Cserépy	Erna Morena, Werner Krauss, Conrad Veidt	Drama	
Countess Kitchenmaid	Rudolf Biebrach	Henny Porten, Heinrich Schroth	Comedy	
Diary of a Lost Woman	Richard Oswald	Erna Morena, Conrad Veidt, Werner Krauss	Drama	
Doctor Schotte	William Wauer	Albert Bassermann, Elsa Bassermann	Drama	
Europe, General Delivery	Ewald André Dupont	Max Landa, Guido Herzfeld	Mystery	
Father and Son	William Wauer	Albert Bassermann, Elsa Bassermann	Drama	
Ferdinand Lassalle	Rudolf Meinert	Erich Kaiser-Titz, Hanna Ralph	Biopic	
The Flight of Arno Jessen	Richard Eichberg	Ernst Rückert, Eva Speyer	Drama	
The Foreign Prince	Paul Wegener	Paul Wegener, Lyda Salmonova	Drama	
Five Minutes Too Late	Uwe Jens Krafft	Mia May, Johannes Riemann, Bruno Kastner	Thriller	
The Flyer from Goerz	Georg Jacoby	Ellen Richter, Harry Liedtke	War	
The Ghost Hunt	Johannes Guter	Ernst Reicher, Esther Carena, Aruth Wartan	Crime	
His Majesty the Hypochondriac	Frederic Zelnik	Grete Diercks, Kurt Vespermann	Comedy	
The Homecoming of Odysseus	Rudolf Biebrach	Henny Porten, Bruno Decarli	Comedy	
Ikarus, the Flying Man	Carl Froelich	Gustav Botz, Esther Carena, Olga Engl	Spy drama	
In the Castle by the Lake	Eugen Burg	Wanda Treumann, Reinhold Schünzel, Karl Beckersachs	Drama	
Jettchen Gebert's Story	Richard Oswald	Mechthildis Thein, Conrad Veidt	Drama	
The Lady, the Devil and the Model	Rudolf Biebrach	Henny Porten, Alfred Abel, Eugen Rex	Drama	
Lorenzo Burghardt	William Wauer	Albert Bassermann, Elsa Bassermann, Käthe Haack	Drama	
Mania	Eugen Illés	Pola Negri, Arthur Schröder	Drama	
Midnight	Ewald André Dupont	Max Landa, Karl Beckersachs, Reinhold Schünzel	Crime	
Ich möchte kein Mann sein	Ernst Lubitsch	Ossi Oswalda, Curt Goetz, Ferry Sikla		
The Nun and the Harlequin	Alfred Halm	Frederic Zelnik, Lya Mara, Paul Bildt	Drama	
Ein neuer Dreibund	Julius Pinschewer		Animated propaganda film	Available online here
The Pied Piper of Hamelin	Paul Wegener	Paul Wegener, Lyda Salmonova, Wilhelm Diegelmann	Drama	
Precious Stones	Rudolf Biebrach	Paul Bildt, Henny Porten, Paul Hartmann	Drama	
The Prisoner of Dahomey	Hubert Moest	Fritz Delius, Paul Hartmann	Drama	
Put to the Test	Rudolf Biebrach	Henny Porten, Heinrich Schroth, Reinhold Schünzel	Comedy	
The Rat	Joe May, Harry Piel	Heinrich Schroth, Olga Engl, Käthe Haack	Crime	
Das Rätsel von Bangalor	Paul Leni, Alexander Antalffy			
The Ringwall Family	Rudolf Biebrach	Henny Porten, Bruno Decarli, Kurt Vespermann	Drama	
The Rosentopf Case	Ernst Lubitsch	Ernst Lubitsch, Trude Hesterberg, Margarete Kupfer	Comedy	
The Sacrifice	Joe May	Mia May, Harry Liedtke, Anton Edthofer	Drama	
Sadja	Adolf Gärtner, Erik Lund	Eva May, Hans Albers	Drama	
The Salamander Ruby	Rudolf Biebrach	Bruno Decarli, Mechthildis Thein, Hugo Flink	Drama	
Der Schreiber und die Biene	Julius Pinschewer		partly animated film	An advertisement for Eduard Beyer
The Seeds of Life	Georg Jacoby	Emil Jannings, Hanna Ralph	Drama	Released in three parts
The Serenyi	Alfred Halm	Lya Mara, Erich Kaiser-Titz, Conrad Veidt	Comedy	
The Sign of Guilt	Richard Eichberg	Bruno Decarli, Helga Molander, Clementine Plessner	Drama	
The Son of Hannibal	Viggo Larsen	Viggo Larsen, Käthe Haack	Drama	
Spring Storms	Fern Andra	Fern Andra, Josef Peterhans, Reinhold Schünzel	Drama	
The Story of Dida Ibsen	Richard Oswald	Anita Berber, Conrad Veidt	Drama	
The Toboggan Cavalier	Ernst Lubitsch	Ossi Oswalda, Harry Liedtke	Comedy	
The Victors	Rudolf Biebrach	Henny Porten, Arthur Bergen, Bruno Decarli	Drama	
Waves of Fate	Joe May	Mia May, Erich Kaiser-Titz, Georg John	Drama	
The Yellow Ticket	Eugen Illés	Pola Negri, Harry Liedtke, Victor Janson	Drama	
Your Big Secret	Joe May	Mia May, Käthe Haack, Johannes Riemann	Drama	
The Zaarden Brothers	William Wauer	Albert Bassermann, Elsa Bassermann, Marija Leiko	Drama	
