= Ludwig Kainer =

German draughtsperson and art collector (1885–1967)

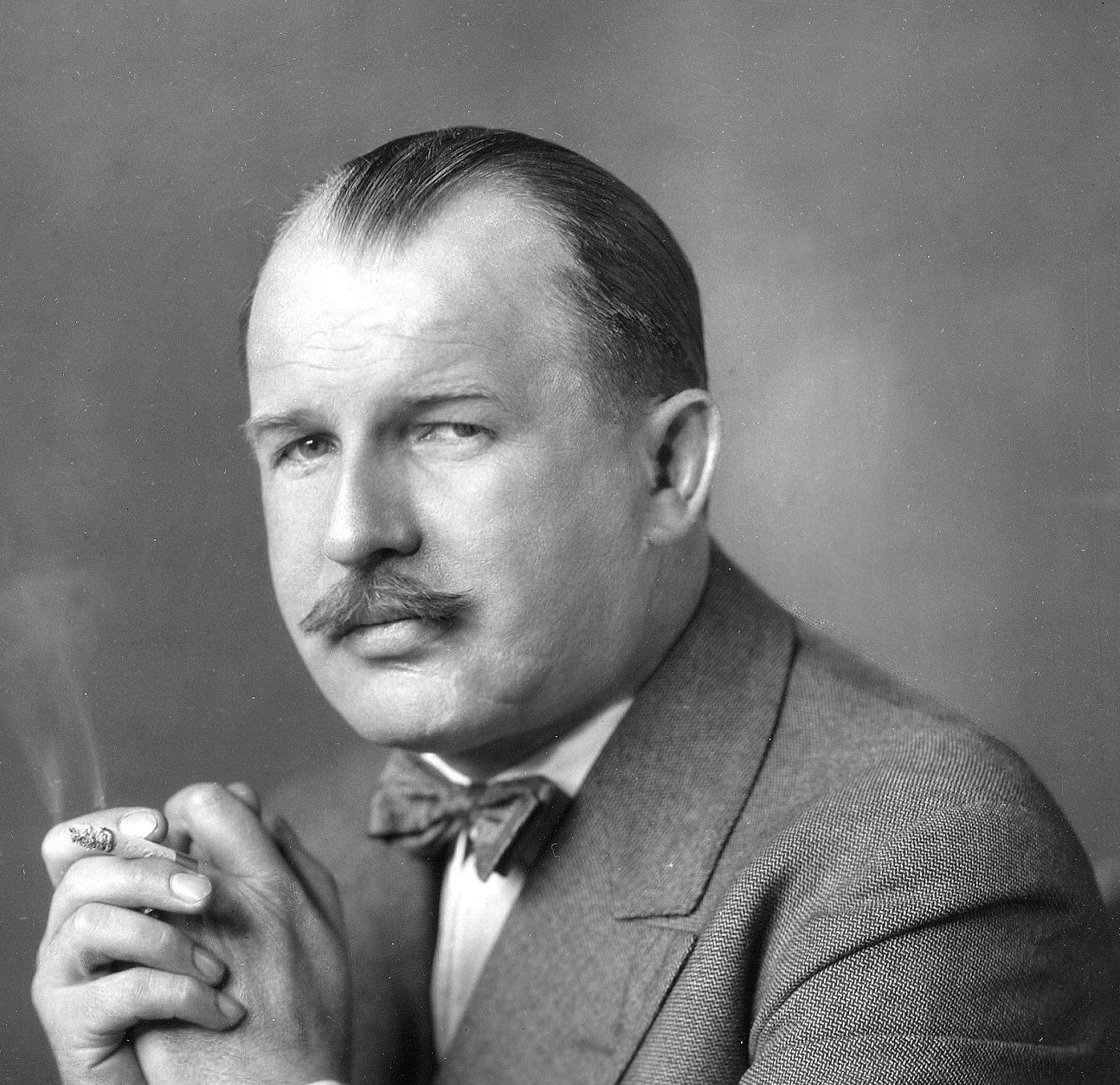
Ludwig Kainer 1926 (photo by Alexander Binder)

Ludwig Kainer (28 June 1885 – 25 April 1967) was a German graphic artist, draftsman, painter, illustrator, film architect and costume designer.

== Early life ==
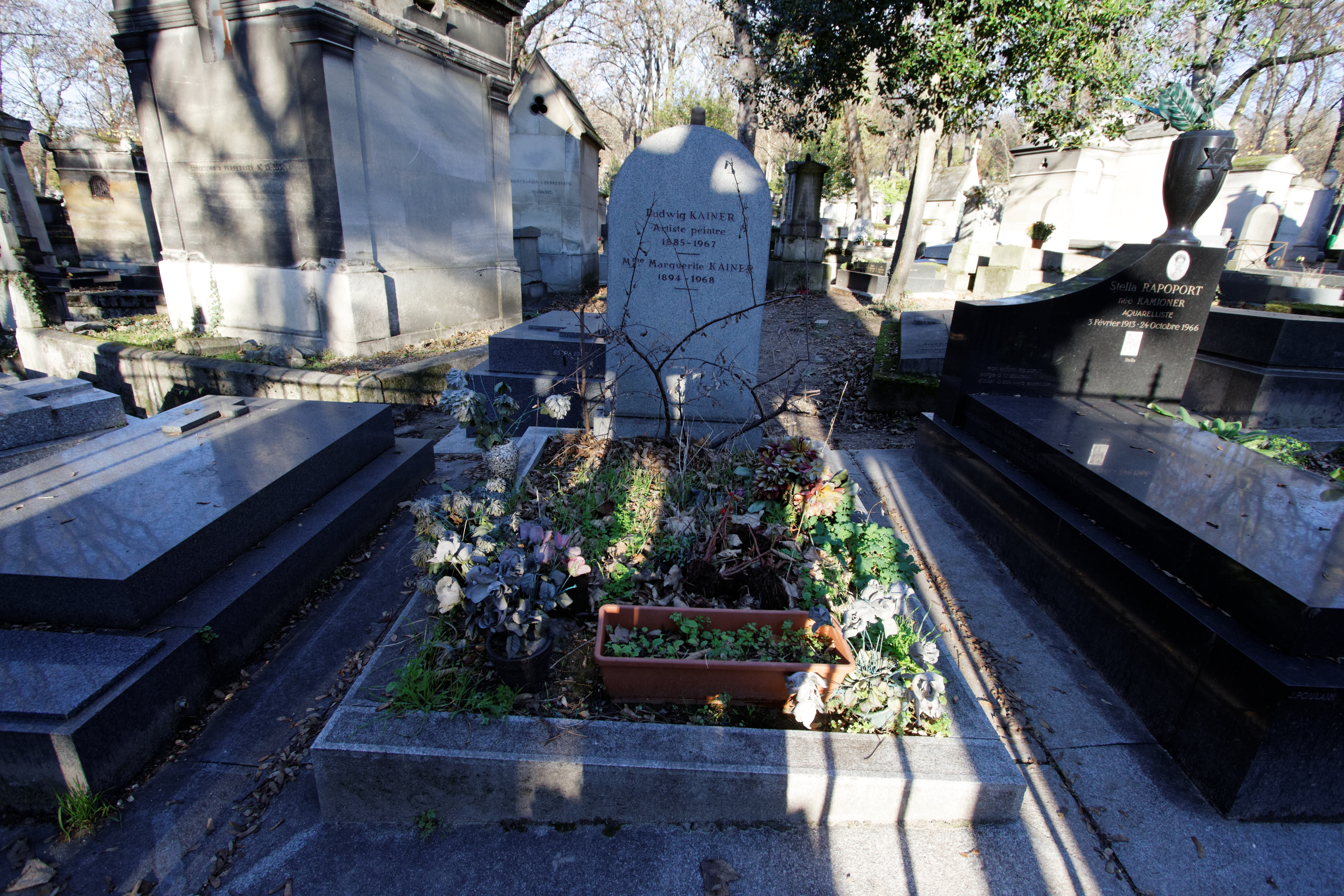
Père-Lachaise, Paris.

Kainer was born in Munich. He studied medicine before turning to art. During a stay in Paris in 1909, Kainer discovered the Impressionists (Paul Cézanne, Henri Matisse and Auguste Renoir), and taught himself the basics of this art. He entered into contact with the Ballets Russes around Sergei Djagilew and Vaslav Nijinsky and contributed to the satirical newspaper Simplicissimus (a total of 205 illustrations by 1930), He met his first wife, the Austrian painter and draftswoman Lene Schneider (1885-1971), during his first stay in Paris (1909/10).

After divorcing in 1924, Kainer married Margaret née Levy (born 26 January 1894 in Berlin, died 1968 in Paris). Margaret's father, Norbert Levy, a wealthy metals dealer, set up a foundation to benefit Margaret shortly before his death in 1927.

== Work as an artist ==
Back in Germany, Kainer settled in Berlin in 1910. He now worked primarily as a graphic artist, designing and drawing posters (e.g. for events with the grotesque dancer Valeska Gert, but also for book advertisements). From 1912 Kainer's illustrations were also featured in magazines such as Der Sturm, Styl, Kleiderkasten and Die Dame. In 1914 he designed the cover of Kurt Pinthus' Das Kinobuch, and in the same year exhibited at the Bugra in Leipzig. In 1920 he provided illustrations and cover art for a volume of stories by Erwin von Busse that courts in Berlin and Leipzig banned.

== Film ==
Immediately after the outbreak of the First World War, Kainer switched to the film industry, where he designed the sets primarily for Oskar Messter's productions, including numerous films with Henny Porten, but also for various productions by Robert Wiene. In later years, he received several commissions as a costume designer. Kainer also took over the artistic direction of Erik Charell's ballet.

After just under a decade, Kainer temporarily ended his film work in 1924 and went to India until the following year. Back home in Germany, he was also active as a stage designer; in the late 1920s and early 1930s, he can be traced as the head of set design at the Theater im Admiralspalast (Haller-Revuen) under Hermann Feiner's direction, and was ultimately a member of his artistic advisory board.

Kainer also worked as a teacher, supervising the fashion drawing department at Berlin's famous Reimann School. Several of his paintings were offered for sale in art auctions.

== Art collection ==
The Kainers owned an art collection with over 400 artworks, some of which had been inherited from Norbert Levy, Margaret Kainer's father.

== Nazi era ==
When the Nazis came to power in Germany in 1933, the Kainers were persecuted because they were Jewish. They went first to Switzerland, then to Paris, where they lived for the rest of their lives. Their art collection was seized by the Nazis and auctioned.

== Post-war ==
After 1945 Kainer worked in Germany and Switzerland as well as in his adopted country France. In 1951 he was represented at a collective exhibition in the Zurich Kunstsalon Wolfsberg, and a little later he gradually withdrew into private life.

Kainer died in Paris on 25 April 1967 at the age of 82. He grave is in Père Lachaise Cemetery (Division 7).

== UBS Scandal ==
Albert Genner, a director at the Swiss UBS bank, revived the Norbert Levy foundation, which had originally been set up to benefit Margaret Kainer (née Levy). Under UBS's management the Foundation "inherited" the artworks that had belonged to the Kainers. and sold them without informating the Kainer family of the collection's existence.

One of the paintings from Kainer's collection that the UBS-run foundation recovered and sold was Edgar Dégas' Danseuses.

When it discovered what UBS had been doing, the Kainer family sued UBS, stating:

Despite the fact that UBS AG and UBS Global Asset Management (Americas) Inc. (together, "UBS") and their predecessor Union Bank of Switzerland were longstanding trusted fiduciaries entrusted to manage the funds of Norbert Levy and his daughter Margaret Kainer, UBS and Defendants looted those assets for a dummy foundation they control. Among other flagrant misdeeds, Defendants, in 2009, without notice to or authority from Plaintiffs, wrongfully sold a painting in New York belonging to Plaintiffs and failed to obtain permission from Plaintiffs or turn over any of the proceeds of the sale with Plaintiffs.

== Restitution claims ==
In 2015, relatives of Ludwig and Margaret Kainer requested the restitution of a painting by Pissarro, The Anse des Pilotes, Le Havre (1903). In May 2021, in the Federal District Court in Atlanta, the heirs sued the family of Gerald D. Horowitz who had bought the painting from the New York dealer Achim Moeller Fine Art in 1995, for its return.

== Films ==
as film architect except where noted

- 1915: Nahira
- 1915: Der Schuß im Traum
- 1916: Feenhände
- 1916: Der Ruf der Liebe
- 1916: Das wandernde Licht
- 1916: Lehmanns Brautfahrt
- 1916: Gelöste Ketten
- 1916: Der Mann im Spiegel
- 1916: Der Liebesbrief der Königin
- 1917: Die Ehe der Luise Rohrbach
- 1917: Gräfin Küchenfee
- 1917: Höhenluft
- 1917: Gefangene Seele
- 1917: Die Faust des Riesen
- 1917: Christa Hartungen
- 1917: Die Prinzessin von Neutralien
- 1917: Furcht
- 1917: Die Claudi vom Geiserhof
- 1918: Edelsteine
- 1918: Das Geschlecht derer von Ringwall
- 1918: Agnes Arnau und ihre drei Freier (also costumes)
- 1918: Auf Probe gestellt
- 1918: Das Maskenfest des Lebens
- 1919: Ihr Sport
- 1920: Exzellenz Unterrock
- 1920: Die goldene Krone
- 1921: Die Geliebte Roswolskys (only advisory)
- 1921: Kean (also costumes)
- 1922: Sie und die Drei (also costumes)
- 1923: Inge Larsen (also costumes)
- 1923: Fräulein Raffke (only costumes)
- 1923: Das Paradies im Schnee
- 1924: Komödianten des Lebens (also costumes)
- 1928: Moulin Rouge (equipment, props)
- 1930: Ein Tango für dich (only costumes)
- 1936: In the Service of the Tsar (also costumes)
- 1939: Entente Cordiale

== Literature ==
- Gustaf Kauder: Ludwig Kainer. In: Das Plakat, Jg. 9 (1918), Heft 3/4, pp. 101–108 (online version)
