= Steadfast Benjamin =

- Directed by: Robert Wiene
- Written by: Robert Wiene
- Produced by: Oskar Messter
- Starring: Guido Herzfeld; Martha Altenberg; Arnold Rieck
- Production company: Messter Film
- Distributed by: Hansa Film
- Release date: 13 April 1917
- Country: Germany
- Languages: Silent; German intertitles

Steadfast Benjamin (German: Der standhafte Benjamin) is a 1917 German silent comedy film directed by Robert Wiene and starring Arnold Rieck, Guido Herzfeld and Martha Altenberg.

== Plot ==
After inheriting a large sum of money, a shoe store worker has to continue in his job due to his ten-year contract, but lives the high life each night.

== Cast ==
- Arnold Rieck
- Guido Herzfeld
- Magda Madeleine
- Agda Nilsson
- Emil Rameau
