= Victim of Society =

1919 German silent drama film

- Directed by: Willy Grunwald
- Written by: Robert Heymann; Robert Wiene
- Produced by: Oskar Messter
- Starring: Conrad Veidt; Kurt Brenkendorf
- Production company: Messter Film
- Distributed by: UFA
- Release date: March 1919
- Country: Germany
- Languages: Silent; German intertitles

Victim of Society (German: Opfer der Gesellschaft) is a 1919 German silent drama film directed by Willy Grunwald and starring Conrad Veidt and Kurt Brenkendorf. Originally shot in 1918, the film was not released until 1919. It is now considered a lost film.

== Cast ==
- Conrad Veidt as Prosecutor Chrysander
- Vilma Born-Junge as Martha Bellina, seine Mutter
- Anneliese Halbe as Chrysanders Verlobte
- Kurt Brenkendorf
- Willy Grunwald
- Carl Wallauer

== Bibliography ==
- Jung, Uli & Schatzberg, Walter. Beyond Caligari: The Films of Robert Wiene. Berghahn Books, 1999.
