= The Giant's Fist =

1917 film directed by Rudolf Biebrach

- Henny Porten and Eduard von Winterstein
- Directed by: Rudolf Biebrach
- Written by: Rudolph Stratz (novel); Ewald André Dupont; Robert Wiene
- Produced by: Oskar Messter
- Starring: Henny Porten; Johannes Riemann
- Cinematography: Karl Freund
- Music by: Giuseppe Becce
- Production company: Messter Film
- Distributed by: Hansa-Film-Verleih
- Release date: 18 November 1917
- Country: Germany
- Languages: Silent; German intertitles

The Giant's Fist (German: Die Faust des Riesen) is a 1917 German silent drama film directed by Rudolf Biebrach and starring Henny Porten and Johannes Riemann.

The film's sets were designed by the art director Ludwig Kainer.

== Cast ==
In alphabetical order

- Rudolf Biebrach as Gehrke
- Herr Kaufmann as Malte von Malchow
- Henny Porten as Martina von Brake
- Auguste Pünkösdy as Gustava von Klützkow
- Johannes Riemann as Leutnant Wend von Brake
- Herr Schmelzer as Runzelnick
- Eduard von Winterstein as Diether von Brake
- Anna Elisabeth Weihrauch as Hella

== Bibliography ==
- Kreimeier, Klaus. The Ufa Story: A History of Germany's Greatest Film Company, 1918-1945. University of California Press, 1999.
