= The Homecoming of Odysseus (1918 film) =

- Directed by: Rudolf Biebrach
- Written by: Robert Wiene
- Produced by: Oskar Messter
- Starring: Henny Porten; Bruno Decarli; Arthur Bergen
- Cinematography: Karl Freund
- Music by: Giuseppe Becce
- Production company: Messter Film
- Distributed by: UFA
- Release date: 25 October 1918
- Running time: 68 minutes
- Country: Germany
- Languages: Silent; German intertitles

The Homecoming of Odysseus (German: Die Heimkehr des Odysseus) is a 1918 German silent comedy film directed by Rudolf Biebrach and starring Henny Porten, Bruno Decarli and Arthur Bergen.

== Cast ==
- Henny Porten as Josepha, die Wirtin
- Bruno Decarli as Hans Immerhofer, Bergführer
- Arthur Bergen as Alois Buttermilch
- Maria Fuchs as Magd
- Rudolf Biebrach as Mond Jakob Schluifer
- Marie Fuchs as Magd
- Justus Glatz as Helli Nazi
- Joseph Uhl as Schneider Vincenz

== Bibliography ==
- Jung, Uli & Schatzberg, Walter. Beyond Caligari: The Films of Robert Wiene. Berghahn Books, 1999.
