= The Spinning Ball (1919 film) =

1919 film

- Scene from a film
- German: Die rollende Kugel
- Directed by: Rudolf Biebrach
- Written by: Henrik Galeen
- Based on: The Gambler by Fyodor Dostoevsky
- Produced by: Oskar Messter
- Starring: Ernst Hofmann; Olga Limburg; Martha Angerstein-Licho
- Production company: Messter Film
- Distributed by: UFA
- Release date: 9 May 1919
- Running time: 66 minutes
- Country: Germany
- Languages: Silent; German intertitles

The Spinning Ball (German: Die rollende Kugel) is a 1919 German silent drama film directed by Rudolf Biebrach and starring Ernst Hofmann, Olga Limburg and Martha Angerstein-Licho. It is an adaptation of the 1866 novel The Gambler by Fyodor Dostoevsky.

It was shot at the Tempelhof Studios in Berlin.

== Cast ==
- Ernst Hofmann as Vanja
- Martha Angerstein-Licho as Pauline Sagorianskij
- Rudolf Biebrach as General Sagorianskij
- Olga Limburg as Blanche
- Georg H. Schnell as Marquis de Grillet

== Bibliography ==
- Bock, Hans-Michael & Töteberg, Michael. Das Ufa-Buch. Zweitausendeins, 1992.
