= The Son of Hannibal =

The Son of Hannibal may refer to:

- The Son of Hannibal (novel), a 1914 German novel by Ludwig Wolff
- The Son of Hannibal (1918 film), a German silent film based on the novel
- The Son of Hannibal (1926 film), a German silent film, remake of the 1918 film
