= The Homecoming of Odysseus =

The Homecoming of Odysseus (German: Die Heimkehr des Odysseus) may refer to:

- The Homecoming of Odysseus (1918 film), a German silent comedy film directed by Rudolf Biebrach
- The Homecoming of Odysseus (1922 film), a German silent historical film directed by Max Obal
