= Maxim Galitzenstein =

Austrian film producer

- Born: 14 July 1886; Vienna, Austro-Hungarian Empire
- Occupation: Producer
- Years active: 1919–1929 (producer)

Maxim Galitzenstein was an Austrian film producer active in the German film industry during the silent era. Of Jewish background, Galitzenstein was associated with the film pioneer Oskar Messter before the First World War.

Along with Paul Ebner he controlled Maxim-Film which had a contract to supply films for release by UFA during the 1920s. He also produced films for distribution by Bavaria Film.

Following the arrival of sound film he left the film business and his later life is unknown.

== Selected filmography ==
- Helmsman Holk (1920)
- Romeo and Juliet in the Snow (1920)
- The Woman in Doctor's Garb (1920)
- A Woman's Revenge (1921)
- The Adventure of Doctor Kircheisen (1921)
- The Brothers Karamazov (1921)
- The Solemn Oath (1921)
- Kean (1921)
- Seafaring Is Necessary (1921)
- The Three Aunts (1921)
- Luise Millerin (1922)
- Navarro the Dancer (1922)
- Shadows of the Past (1922)
- The Island of Tears (1923)
- The Secret of Brinkenhof (1923)
- The Love of a Queen (1923)
- Claire (1924)
- The Man in the Saddle (1925)
- The Director General (1925)
- The Painter and His Model (1925)
- The Son of Hannibal (1926)
- The Master of Death (1926)
- Fedora (1926)
- Professor Imhof (1926)
- Light-Hearted Isabel (1927)
- The Woman Who Couldn't Say No (1927)
- Tragedy of a Marriage (1927)
- Ariadne in Hoppegarten (1928)
- The Veil Dancer (1929)
- The Way Through the Night (1929)
- Call at Midnight (1929)

== Bibliography ==
- Prawer, S.S. Between Two Worlds: The Jewish Presence in German and Austrian Film, 1910-1933. Berghahn Books, 2007.
