= No Sin on the Alpine Pastures =

No Sin on the Alpine Pastures (German: Auf der Alm, da gibt's ka Sünd) may refer to:

- No Sin on the Alpine Pastures (1915 film), a silent German comedy film
- No Sin on the Alpine Pastures (1950 film), an Austrian comedy film
- No Sin on the Alpine Pastures (1974 film), a West Germany comedy film
