= Imprisoned Soul =

- Directed by: Rudolf Biebrach
- Written by: Robert Wiene
- Produced by: Oskar Messter
- Starring: Henny Porten; Paul Bildt; Curt Goetz
- Cinematography: Karl Freund
- Music by: Giuseppe Becce
- Production company: Messter Film
- Release date: 31 August 1917
- Country: Germany
- Languages: Silent; German intertitles

Imprisoned Soul (German: Gefangene Seele) is a German silent drama film of 1917 directed by Rudolf Biebrach and starring Henny Porten, Paul Bildt, and Curt Goetz. A young woman, Violetta, falls under the hypnotic power of the villainous Baron von Groot. A young physician tries to rescue her from his clutches. She is finally released from Groot's power when he is found shot dead. The film's theme of hypnotic domination is very similar to that of The Cabinet of Dr. Caligari (1919) which the screenwriter Weine was to direct two years later.

== Cast ==
- Henny Porten – Violetta
- Paul Bildt – Baron von Groot
- Curt Goetz – Stefan Rainer

== Bibliography ==
- Jung, Uli & Schatzberg, Walter. Beyond Caligari: The Films of Robert Wiene. Berghahn Books, 1999.
