= Frank Hansen's Fortune =

1917 film

- Directed by: Viggo Larsen
- Written by: Robert Wiene
- Produced by: Oskar Messter
- Starring: Viggo Larsen; Lupu Pick; Kitty Dewal
- Production company: Messter Film
- Distributed by: Hansa Film
- Release date: May 1917
- Country: Germany
- Languages: Silent; German intertitles

Frank Hansen's Fortune (German: Frank Hansens Glück) is a 1917 German silent Western film directed by Viggo Larsen and starring Larsen, Lupu Pick and Kitty Dewall. Two diggers working in the Mexican diamond fields discover a very valuable diamond leading to a series of events that sees only one of them become rich.

== Cast ==
- Viggo Larsen as Frank Hansen
- Lupu Pick as George Balker
- Kitty Dewall
- Leopold Gadiel
- Viktor Senger

== Bibliography ==
- Jung, Uli & Schatzberg, Walter. Beyond Caligari: The Films of Robert Wiene. Berghahn Books, 1999.
