= The Adventure of a Ball Night =

1918 film

- Directed by: Viggo Larsen
- Written by: Hans Hyan
- Produced by: Oskar Messter
- Starring: Gertrude Welcker; Paul Bildt; Paul Biensfeldt
- Cinematography: Eugen Illés
- Music by: Giuseppe Becce
- Production company: Messter Film
- Distributed by: UFA
- Release date: May 1918
- Country: Germany
- Languages: Silent; German intertitles

The Adventure of a Ball Night (German: Das Abenteuer einer Ballnacht) is a 1918 German silent adventure film directed by Viggo Larsen and starring Gertrude Welcker, Paul Bildt, and Paul Biensfeldt.

The film's sets were designed by the art director Willy Helwig.

== Cast ==
- Gertrude Welcker as Baronesse Blanca von Walheim
- Viggo Larsen as Graf von Lahnsdorff
- Paul Bildt as Hans Freiherr von Badewitz
- Paul Biensfeldt as Der schwarze Max

== Bibliography ==
- Bock, Hans-Michael; Töteberg, Michael, eds. (1994) [1992]. Das Ufa-Buch: Kunst und Krisen, Stars und Regisseure, Wirtschaft und Politik (in German). Frankfurt: Zweitausendeins. ISBN 978-3-86150-065-0.
