= Lehmann's Honeymoon =

- Directed by: Robert Wiene
- Written by: Arthur Bergen; Robert Wiene
- Produced by: Oskar Messter
- Starring: Guido Herzfeld; Christel Lorenz; Arnold Rieck
- Music by: Giuseppe Becce
- Production company: Messter Film
- Release date: November 1916
- Country: Germany
- Languages: Silent; German intertitles

Lehmann's Honeymoon (German: Lehmanns Brautfahrt) is a 1916 German silent comedy film directed by Robert Wiene and starring Guido Herzfeld, Christel Lorenz, and Arnold Rieck. In order to persuade a daydreaming Professor of Greek History to marry his cousin, his family dress themselves up as Ancient Greeks.

== Cast ==
- Guido Herzfeld
- Christel Lorenz
- Arnold Rieck
- Hella Thornegg

== Bibliography ==
- Jung, Uli & Schatzberg, Walter. Beyond Caligari: The Films of Robert Wiene. Berghahn Books, 1999.
