= The Son of Hannibal (1918 film) =

- Directed by: Viggo Larsen
- Written by: Karl Singer (writer); Rudolf Strauß; Ludwig Wolff (novel)
- Produced by: Oskar Messter
- Starring: Viggo Larsen; Franz Verdier; Käthe Haack
- Music by: Giuseppe Becce
- Production company: Messter Film
- Distributed by: UFA
- Release date: August 1918
- Country: Germany
- Languages: Silent; German intertitles

The Son of Hannibal (German: Der Sohn des Hannibal) is a 1918 German silent film directed by and starring Viggo Larsen. It also features Franz Verdier and Käthe Haack. The film was remade in 1926.

== Bibliography ==
- Bock, Hans-Michael & Bergfelder, Tim. The Concise CineGraph. Encyclopedia of German Cinema. Berghahn Books, 2009.
