= The Woman in Doctor's Garb =

1920 film

- Directed by: Rudolf Biebrach
- Written by: Arnold Lippschitz
- Produced by: Paul Ebner; Maxim Galitzenstein
- Starring: Lotte Neumann; Felix Basch
- Cinematography: Otto Tober
- Production company: Maxim-Film
- Release date: 2 July 1920
- Running time: 50 minutes
- Country: Germany
- Languages: Silent; German intertitles

The Woman in Doctor's Garb (German: Die Frau im Doktorhut) is a 1920 German silent comedy film directed by Rudolf Biebrach and starring Lotte Neumann and Felix Basch.

The film's sets were designed by the art director Hans Sohnle.

== Cast ==
In alphabetical order

- Felix Basch as Dr. George Hill
- Charlotte Ewald as Henrika Mondschein
- Erich Heinz Hentschke as Mendelin Kümmerlein
- Lotte Neumann as Dr. Lily Guyot
- Neumann-Schüler
- Marie Rappeport as Zofe Lissy
- Ferry Sikla as Siegmund Meyer I.
- Max Wilmsen as Diener Fritz

== Bibliography ==
- Grange, William. Cultural Chronicle of the Weimar Republic. Scarecrow Press, 2008.
