= The Robber Bride (film) =

- Directed by: Robert Wiene
- Written by: Robert Wiene
- Produced by: Oskar Messter
- Starring: Henny Porten; Friedrich Feher; Artur Menzel
- Cinematography: Karl Freund
- Music by: Giuseppe Becce
- Production company: Messter Film
- Distributed by: Hansa Film
- Release date: 29 September 1916
- Country: Germany
- Languages: Silent; German intertitles

The Robber Bride (German: Die Räuberbraut) is a 1916 German silent comedy film directed by Robert Wiene and starring Henny Porten, Friedrich Feher and Artur Menzel. A young woman with romantic ideas rejects the arranged marriage her parents want for her, dreaming instead of marrying a bandit.

== Cast ==
- Henny Porten
- Friedrich Feher
- Artur Menzel
- Karl Elzer

== Bibliography ==
- Jung, Uli & Schatzberg, Walter. Beyond Caligari: The Films of Robert Wiene. Berghahn Books, 1999.
