= The Lady, the Devil and the Model =

1918 film

- Eugen Rex, Henny Porten
- Directed by: Rudolf Biebrach
- Written by: Robert Wiene
- Produced by: Oskar Messter
- Starring: Henny Porten; Alfred Abel; Eugen Rex
- Cinematography: Karl Freund
- Music by: Giuseppe Becce
- Production company: Messter Film
- Distributed by: UFA
- Release date: 16 December 1918
- Running time: 67 minutes
- Country: Germany
- Languages: Silent; German intertitles

The Lady, the Devil and the Model (German: Die Dame, der Teufel und die Probiermamsell) is a 1918 German silent drama film directed by Rudolf Biebrach and starring Henny Porten, Alfred Abel and Eugen Rex.

It was shot at the Tempelhof Studios in Berlin. The film's sets were designed by the art director Kurt Richter.

== Cast ==
- Henny Porten as Die Probiermamsell - Mannequin
- Alfred Abel as Der Baron - Kavalier
- Ida Perry as Die Dame - Millionärin
- Eugen Rex as Fritz
- Rudolf Biebrach

== Bibliography ==
- Jung, Uli & Schatzberg, Walter. Beyond Caligari: The Films of Robert Wiene. Berghahn Books, 1999.
