= Mountain Air (film) =

1917 film directed by Rudolf Biebrach

- Directed by: Rudolf Biebrach
- Written by: Siegfried Philippi
- Produced by: Oskar Messter
- Starring: Henny Porten; Paul Hartmann; Reinhold Schünzel
- Cinematography: Karl Freund
- Music by: Giuseppe Becce
- Production company: Messter Film
- Release date: 26 October 1917
- Country: Germany
- Languages: Silent; German intertitles

Mountain Air (German: Höhenluft) is a 1917 German silent comedy film directed by Rudolf Biebrach and starring Henny Porten, Paul Hartmann, and Reinhold Schünzel.

The film's sets were designed by the art director Ludwig Kainer.

== Cast ==
- Henny Porten as Fürstin von Solmsdorf
- Paul Hartmann as Egon
- Reinhold Schünzel as Von Storch
- Lupu Pick as Von Melbitz
- Max Laurence as Herzog von Isenburg
- Emmy Wyda as Von Briesen
- Rudolf Biebrach as Lämmermeier

== Bibliography ==
- Bock, Hans-Michael & Bergfelder, Tim. The Concise CineGraph. Encyclopedia of German Cinema. Berghahn Books, 2009.
