= Two Worlds (1922 film) =

1922 film

- Directed by: Richard Löwenbein
- Written by: Lothar Knud Frederik
- Starring: Sascha Gura; Arnold Rieck; Johanna Ewald
- Cinematography: Conrad Wienecke
- Production company: Deulig Film
- Release date: 8 December 1922
- Country: Germany
- Languages: Silent; German intertitles

Two Worlds (German: Zwei Welten) is a 1922 German silent film directed by Richard Löwenbein and starring Sascha Gura, Arnold Rieck, and Johanna Ewald.

The film's sets were designed by the art director Hans Sohnle.

== Cast ==
- Sascha Gura as Maria Schönhaus, Tänzerin
- Arnold Rieck as Guido Bellacasa, Tanzlehrer
- Johanna Ewald as Anette Bellacasa, seine Frau
- Ludwig Hartau as Rechnungsrat Möller
- Ilka Grüning as seine Frau
- Gerd Fricke as Hans, beider Sohn
- Auguste Prasch-Grevenberg as Alma Großkopf, Frau Möllers Mutter
- Heinrich Peer as Baron von Felden
- Jaro Fürth as Maler Steiniger
- Hedwig Schröder as Alma Großkopf
- Albert Vennefeld as Wendelin Großkopf
- Dora Friese
