= Her Sport =

- Directed by: Rudolf Biebrach
- Written by: Robert Wiene
- Produced by: Oskar Messter
- Starring: Henny Porten
- Cinematography: Willy Gaebel
- Edited by: Wally Koch
- Music by: Giuseppe Becce
- Production company: Messter Film
- Distributed by: UFA
- Release date: 12 April 1919
- Running time: 72 minutes
- Country: Germany
- Languages: Silent; German intertitles

Her Sport (German: Ihr Sport) is a 1919 German silent comedy film directed by Rudolf Biebrach and starring Henny Porten, Georg H. Schnell and Hermann Thimig. A man-hating young woman tries to break up her friend's new marriage, but while in the Alps she meets her own ideal man.

It was shot at the Tempelhof Studios in Berlin.

== Cast ==
- Henny Porten as Adelina von Gentz
- Georg H. Schnell as Rudolf Walters
- Hermann Thimig as Rudi Walters
- Wally Koch as Helga Walters
- Rudolf Biebrach

== Bibliography ==
- Jung, Uli & Schatzberg, Walter. Beyond Caligari: The Films of Robert Wiene. Berghahn Books, 1999.
