= The Blue Lantern =

1918 film directed by Rudolf Biebrach

- Directed by: Rudolf Biebrach
- Written by: Paul Lindau (novel); Robert Wiene; Irene Daland
- Starring: Henny Porten; Ferdinand von Alten
- Cinematography: Karl Freund
- Music by: Giuseppe Becce
- Production company: Messter Film
- Distributed by: UFA
- Release date: 29 November 1918
- Running time: 56 minutes
- Country: Germany
- Languages: Silent; German intertitles

The Blue Lantern (German: Die blaue Laterne) is a 1918 German silent drama film directed by Rudolf Biebrach and starring Henny Porten and Ferdinand von Alten.

The film's sets were designed by the art director Jack Winter.

== Cast ==
In alphabetical order

- Rudolf Biebrach as Korachi
- Paul Biensfeldt as Tanzlehrer Schweydam
- Bruno Eichgrün as Privatlehrer Kurt
- Karl Elzer as Bankier Fören
- Clara Heinrich as Frau Geheimrat Franzius
- Gertrude Hoffman as Hilde
- Walfried Mellin as Klein Herbert
- Henny Porten as Sabine 'Saby' Steinhardt
- Ferdinand von Alten as Legationsrat von Guntershausen
- Johanna Zimmermann as Ellen

== Bibliography ==
- Elsaesser, Thomas; Wedel, Michael, eds. (1999). The BFI Companion to German Cinema. London: British Film Institute. ISBN 978-0-85170-750-1.
