= Life Is a Dream (1917 film) =

- Directed by: Robert Wiene
- Written by: Richard Wurmfeld; Robert Wiene
- Produced by: Oskar Messter
- Starring: Emil Jannings; Bruno Decarli; Maria Fein
- Production company: Messter Film
- Distributed by: Hansa Film
- Release date: February 1917
- Country: Germany
- Languages: Silent; German intertitles

Life Is a Dream (German: Das Leben ein Traum) is a 1917 German silent drama film directed by Robert Wiene and starring Emil Jannings, Bruno Decarli and Maria Fein. A young aristocrat meets a man and marries him, but soon discovers he is a monster. After his death she grows increasingly mad, until a revolutionary new cure is attempted which makes her believe that the whole episode was simply a dream.

== Cast ==
- Emil Jannings
- Bruno Decarli
- Maria Fein
- Alexander Antalffy
- Emil Rameau

== Bibliography ==
- Jung, Uli & Schatzberg, Walter. Beyond Caligari: The Films of Robert Wiene. Berghahn Books, 1999.
