= The Woman in the Cupboard =

1927 film

- Directed by: Rudolf Biebrach
- Written by: Octave Mirbeau (play); Soulié Dussieux de Chennevières (play); Bobby E. Lüthge
- Starring: Kaethe Consee; Willy Fritsch
- Cinematography: Werner Brandes
- Music by: Gustav Gold
- Production company: UFA
- Distributed by: UFA
- Release date: 30 September 1927
- Country: Germany
- Languages: Silent; German intertitles

The Woman in the Cupboard (German: Die Frau im Schrank) is a 1927 German silent comedy film directed by Rudolf Biebrach and starring Kaethe Consee and Willy Fritsch. It was adapted by Bobby E. Lüthge from the play by Octave Mirbeau and Soulié Dussieux de Chennevières. The film's art direction was by Erich Czerwonski.

== Cast ==
In alphabetical order

- Rudolf Biebrach
- Kaethe Consee
- Willy Fritsch as Dr. Richard Marchal
- Harry Hardt as Solicitor Thibault
- Arnold Korff as Col. Gaston Belfort
- Olga Limburg
- Fee Malten as Claire Labori
- Imre Ráday
- Gyula Szőreghy
- Ruth Weyher as Lucie

== Bibliography ==
- Grange, William. Cultural Chronicle of the Weimar Republic. Scarecrow Press, 2008.
