= The Woman on the Panther =

1923 film

- Directed by: Alfred Halm
- Written by: Alfred Halm
- Starring: Grete Reinwald; Hermann Thimig; Olga Limburg
- Production company: Hermes-Film
- Release date: 25 March 1923
- Country: Germany
- Languages: Silent; German intertitles

The Woman on the Panther (German: Das Weib auf dem Panther) is a 1923 German silent film directed by Alfred Halm and starring Grete Reinwald, Hermann Thimig, and Olga Limburg.

== Cast ==
- Grete Reinwald
- Hermann Thimig
- Olga Limburg
- Ilka Grüning
- Wilhelm Diegelmann
- Karl Harbacher
- Charles Puffy
- Hans Junkermann
- Arnold Rieck

== Bibliography ==
- Bock, Hans-Michael & Bergfelder, Tim. The Concise CineGraph. Encyclopedia of German Cinema. Berghahn Books, 2009.
