= The Victors (1918 film) =

- Directed by: Rudolf Biebrach
- Written by: Felix Philippi (novel)
- Produced by: Oskar Messter
- Starring: Henny Porten; Arthur Bergen; Bruno Decarli
- Cinematography: Karl Freund
- Music by: Giuseppe Becce
- Production company: Messter Film
- Distributed by: UFA
- Release date: 27 September 1918
- Running time: 75 minutes
- Country: Germany
- Languages: Silent; German intertitles

The Victors (German: Die Sieger) is a 1918 German silent drama film directed by Rudolf Biebrach and starring Henny Porten, Arthur Bergen and Bruno Decarli.

The film's sets were designed by the art director Jack Winter.

== Cast ==
- Henny Porten as Konstanze Assing
- Arthur Bergen as Camille Düpaty
- Bruno Decarli as Siegmund Freystetter
- Rudolf Biebrach as Musikprofessor Assing
- Paul Biensfeldt as Buchbindermeister Gerum
- Elsa Wagner as Frau Freystetter

== Bibliography ==
- Hans-Michael Bock & Michael Töteberg. Das Ufa-Buch. Zweitausendeins, 1992.
