= Shadows of the Past (1922 film) =

1922 film

- Directed by: Rudolf Biebrach
- Written by: Wilhelm Auspitzer
- Produced by: Paul Ebner; Maxim Galitzenstein
- Starring: Gertrude Welcker; Ernst Hofmann; Erich Kaiser-Titz
- Cinematography: Georg Schubert
- Production company: Maxim-Film
- Distributed by: UFA
- Release date: 15 March 1922
- Country: Germany
- Languages: Silent; German intertitles

Shadows of the Past (German: Schatten der Vergangenheit) is a 1922 German silent film directed by Rudolf Biebrach and starring Gertrude Welcker, Ernst Hofmann and Erich Kaiser-Titz.

== Cast ==
- Gertrude Welcker as Helga
- Ernst Hofmann as Arvid Paulsen - Secretary
- Erich Kaiser-Titz as Löwenborg
- Anton Edthofer as Jens Holmberg - Artist
- Heinrich Schroth as Henrik Krag - Private Detective
- Rudolf Biebrach as Christensen
- Josefine Dora as Mrs. Hendersen
- Erna Hauk as Gerda

== Bibliography ==
- Hans-Michael Bock & Michael Töteberg. Das Ufa-Buch. Zweitausendeins, 1992.
