= The Queen's Secretary =

1916 film directed by Robert Wiene

- Directed by: Robert Wiene
- Written by: Robert Wiene
- Produced by: Oskar Messter
- Starring: Käthe Dorsch; Ressel Orla; Margarete Kupfer
- Production company: Messter Film
- Release date: April 1916
- Country: Germany
- Languages: Silent; German intertitles

The Queen's Secretary (German: Der Sekretär der Königin) is a 1916 German silent comedy film directed by Robert Wiene and starring Käthe Dorsch, Ressel Orla and Margarete Kupfer. A young Queen secretly marries the commander of her bodyguard, but things are complicated when his ex-lover arrives with a touring opera company. The film was widely praised for its direction, acting and cinematography.

== Cast ==
- Käthe Dorsch
- Ressel Orla
- Margarete Kupfer
- Alexander Antalffy
- Guido Herzfeld
- Heinrich Schroth

== Bibliography ==
- Jung, Uli & Schatzberg, Walter. Beyond Caligari: The Films of Robert Wiene. Berghahn Books, 1999.
