= The Canned Bride =

1915 film by Robert Wiene

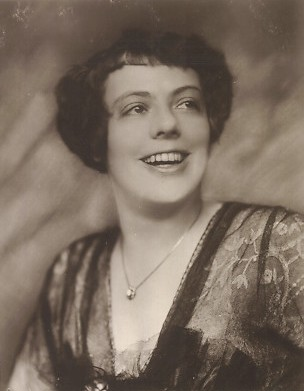
- Senta Söneland (c. 1920)
- Directed by: Robert Wiene
- Written by: Walter Turszinsky
- Produced by: Oskar Messter
- Starring: Margarete Kupfer; Senta Söneland; Bogia Horska
- Production company: Messter Film
- Distributed by: Hansa Film
- Release date: 1915
- Country: Germany
- Languages: Silent; German intertitles

The Canned Bride (German: Die Konservenbraut) is a 1915 German silent comedy film directed by Robert Wiene and starring Margarete Kupfer, Senta Söneland and Bogia Horska.

== Cast ==
- Margarete Kupfer
- Bogia Horska
- Senta Söneland
- Paul Biensfeldt
- Guido Herzfeld

== Bibliography ==
- Jung, Uli & Schatzberg, Walter. Beyond Caligari: The Films of Robert Wiene. Berghahn Books, 1999.
