= Put to the Test =

- Directed by: Rudolf Biebrach
- Written by: Robert Wiene
- Produced by: Oskar Messter
- Starring: Henny Porten; Heinrich Schroth; Reinhold Schünzel
- Cinematography: Karl Freund
- Music by: Giuseppe Becce
- Production company: Messter Film
- Distributed by: UFA
- Release date: 15 March 1918
- Country: Germany
- Languages: Silent; German intertitles

Put to the Test (German: Auf Probe gestellt) is a 1918 German silent comedy film directed by Rudolf Biebrach and starring Henny Porten, Heinrich Schroth and Reinhold Schünzel.

The film's sets were designed by the art director Ludwig Kainer.

== Cast ==
- Henny Porten as Gräfin Marlene von Steinitz
- Heinrich Schroth as Graf von Steinitz, Marlenes Schwager
- Reinhold Schünzel as Reichsgraf Adolar von Warowingen
- Hermann Thimig as Frank Merwin, Maler
- Rudolf Biebrach as Haushofmeister
- Kurt Vespermann
- Kurt Ehrle

== Bibliography ==
- Jung, Uli & Schatzberg, Walter. Beyond Caligari: The Films of Robert Wiene. Berghahn Books, 1999.
