= Werner Krafft =

1916 film directed by Carl Froelich

- Directed by: Carl Froelich
- Written by: Alfred Schirokauer
- Produced by: Oskar Messter
- Starring: Eduard von Winterstein; Erika Glässner; Reinhold Schünzel
- Production company: Messter Film
- Release date: 17 August 1916
- Running time: 73 minutes
- Country: Germany
- Languages: Silent; German intertitles

Werner Krafft is a 1916 German silent drama film directed by Carl Froelich and starring Eduard von Winterstein, Erika Glässner and Reinhold Schünzel.

== Cast ==
- Eduard von Winterstein as Werner Krafft
- Reinhold Schünzel as Heinz Kleinschmidt
- Erika Glässner as Erika
- Sybil Smolova as Anni

== Bibliography ==
- Bock, Hans-Michael & Bergfelder, Tim. The Concise CineGraph. Encyclopedia of German Cinema. Berghahn Books, 2009.
