= The Solemn Oath =

1921 film

- Directed by: Rudolf Biebrach
- Written by: Heinrich Lautensack (play); Thomas Hall
- Produced by: Paul Ebner; Maxim Galitzenstein
- Starring: Theodor Loos; Lotte Neumann; Eugen Rex; Rudolf Biebrach
- Production company: Maxim-Film
- Distributed by: UFA
- Release date: 7 June 1921
- Country: Germany
- Languages: Silent; German intertitles

The Solemn Oath (German: Das Gelübde) is a 1921 German silent comedy film directed by Rudolf Biebrach and starring Theodor Loos, Lotte Neumann and Eugen Rex. It premiered in Berlin on 7 June 1921. The film's art direction was by Hans Sohnle. It was based on a play by Heinrich Lautensack.

== Cast ==
- Theodor Loos as Graf Horst
- Lotte Neumann
- Eugen Rex
- Rudolf Biebrach
- Julie Abich
- Albert Kunze
- Albert Patry
- Erich Walter
- Hanns Waschatko

== Bibliography ==
- Grange, William. Cultural Chronicle of the Weimar Republic.Scarecrow Press, 2008.
