= The Ringwall Family =

- Directed by: Rudolf Biebrach
- Written by: Robert Wiene
- Produced by: Oskar Messter
- Starring: Henny Porten; Bruno Decarli; Kurt Vespermann
- Cinematography: Karl Freund
- Music by: Giuseppe Becce
- Production company: Messter Film
- Distributed by: UFA
- Release date: 19 April 1918
- Running time: 74 minutes
- Country: Germany
- Languages: Silent; German intertitles

The Ringwall Family (German: Das Geschlecht derer von Ringwall) is a 1918 German silent drama film directed by Rudolf Biebrach and starring Henny Porten, Bruno Decarli and Kurt Vespermann.

The film's sets were designed by the art directors Ludwig Kainer and Jack Winter.

== Cast ==
- Henny Porten as Magdalena von Ringwall
- Bruno Decarli as Magdalenas Vormund
- Kurt Vespermann as Argad, Magdalenas Brunder
- Heinz Burkart as Hans von Sendling
- Rudolf Biebrach as Der alte Wieland
- Frida Richard as Die alte Brigitte

== Bibliography ==
- Jung, Uli & Schatzberg, Walter. Beyond Caligari: The Films of Robert Wiene. Berghahn Books, 1999.
