= Seafaring Is Necessary =

1921 film

- Directed by: Rudolf Biebrach
- Written by: Gorch Fock (novel); Thomas Hall
- Produced by: Paul Ebner; Maxim Galitzenstein
- Starring: Hans Marr; Lucie Höflich; Ilka Grüning
- Cinematography: Julius Balting
- Production company: Maxim-Film
- Distributed by: UFA
- Release date: 26 August 1921
- Country: Germany
- Languages: Silent; German intertitles

Seafaring Is Necessary (German: Seefahrt ist Not) is a 1921 German silent drama film directed by Rudolf Biebrach and starring Hans Marr, Lucie Höflich and Ilka Grüning. It is based on a novel by Gorch Fock.

The film's sets were designed by the art director Hans Sohnle.

== Cast ==
- Hans Marr
- Lucie Höflich
- Ilka Grüning
- Rudolf Biebrach
- Hugo Döblin
- Albert Kuntze
- Werner Pfullmann
- Hermann Picha
- Tommy Tomborini

== Bibliography ==
- Hans-Michael Bock & Michael Töteberg. Das Ufa-Buch. Zweitausendeins, 1992.
