= Rudolf Biebrach =

German actor and director

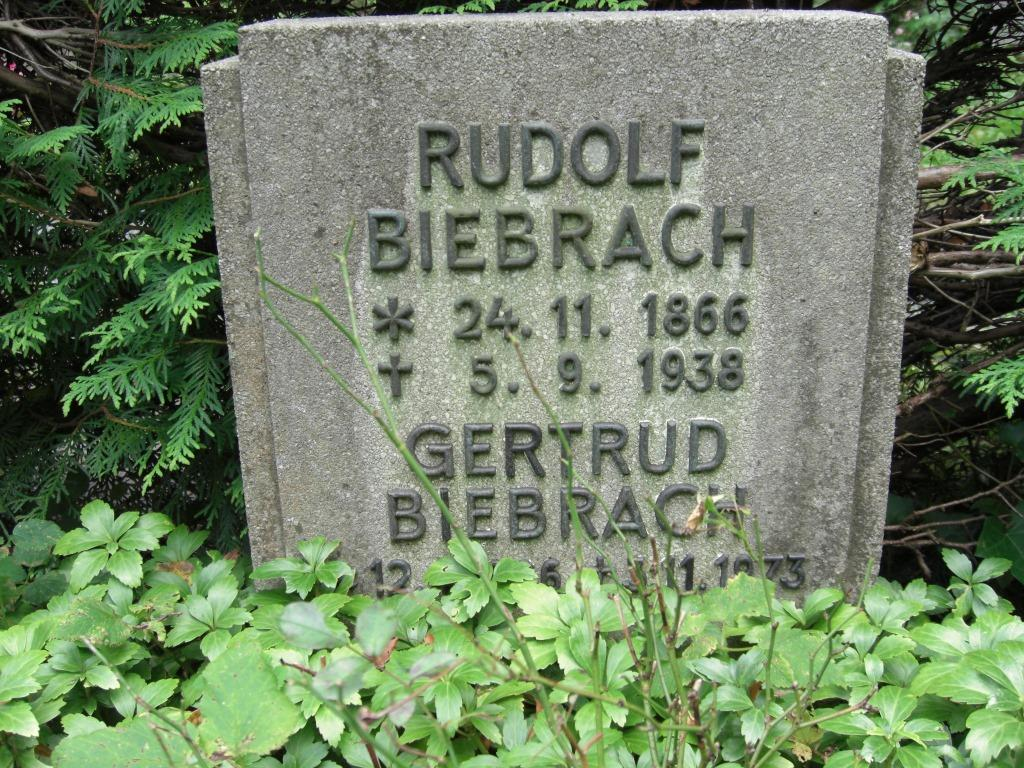
- Biebrach's grave at the Friedhof Wilmersdorf in Berlin
- Born: 24 November 1866; Leipzig, Kingdom of Saxony
- Died: 5 September 1938 (aged 71); Berlin, Germany
- Occupation(s): Film director, Actor
- Years active: 1890-1938

Rudolf Biebrach (24 November 1866 – 5 September 1938) was a German actor and film director. He directed over 70 films between 1909 and 1930; and he appeared as an actor in nearly 110 films between 1909 and 1938. In his youth, Biebrach had worked for some years as an engraver. He got his first engagement as an actor in Gießen during 1890/1891. After a long career as a stage actor, Biebrach managed to become a successful director and character actor in the German film during the 1910s. He directed many films with Henny Porten and Lotte Neumann.

== Selected filmography ==
=== Actor ===
- No Sin on the Alpine Pastures (1915)
- The Queen's Love Letter (1916)
- The Giant's Fist (1917)
- Mountain Air (1917)
- The Homecoming of Odysseus (1918)
- The Blue Lantern (1918)
- The Ringwall Family (1918)
- The Salamander Ruby (1918)
- The Lady, the Devil and the Model (1918)
- Agnes Arnau and Her Three Suitors (1918)
- Put to the Test (1918)
- The Victors (1918)
- Rose Bernd (1919)
- The Spinning Ball (1919)
- The Legend of Holy Simplicity (1920)
- Hundemamachen (1920)
- The Solemn Oath (1921)
- Seafaring Is Necessary (1921)
- Kean (1921)
- Shadows of the Past (1922)
- The Secret of Brinkenhof (1923)
- Felicitas Grolandin (1923)
- The Love of a Queen (1923)
- Carlos and Elisabeth (1924)
- The Four Marriages of Matthias Merenus (1924)
- The Adventures of Sybil Brent (1925)
- Slums of Berlin (1925)
- False Shame (1926)
- The Poacher (1926)
- Eva and the Grasshopper (1927)
- The Woman in the Cupboard (1927)
- Sajenko the Soviet (1928)
- The Beaver Coat (1928)
- Mary Lou (1928)
- Guilty (1928)
- Scandal in Baden-Baden (1929)
- Children of the Street (1929)
- The Man with the Frog (1929)
- Come Back, All Is Forgiven (1929)
- Peter the Mariner (1929)
- High Treason (1929)
- Hocuspocus (1930)
- Love in the Ring (1930)
- A Student's Song of Heidelberg (1930)
- The White Devil (1930)
- Waltz of Love (1930)
- The Street Song (1931)
- Between Night and Dawn (1931)
- Emil and the Detectives (1931)
- The Scoundrel (1931)
- The Beautiful Adventure (1932)
- Two Hearts Beat as One (1932)
- Happy Days in Aranjuez (1933)
- Love Must Be Understood (1933)
- Black Fighter Johanna (1934)
- One Too Many on Board (1935)
- If It Were Not for Music (1935)
- Inkognito (1936)
- Boccaccio (1936)
- Escapade (1936)

=== Director ===
- No Sin on the Alpine Pastures (1915)
- Christa Hartungen (1917)
- The Giant's Fist (1917)
- Imprisoned Soul (1917)
- Mountain Air (1917)
- The Marriage of Luise Rohrbach (1917)
- The Princess of Neutralia (1917)
- The Blue Lantern (1918)
- Put to the Test (1918)
- Precious Stones (1918)
- The Ringwall Family (1918)
- The Lady, the Devil and the Model (1918)
- The Salamander Ruby (1918)
- Agnes Arnau and Her Three Suitors (1918)
- Countess Kitchenmaid (1918)
- The Victors (1918)
- The Homecoming of Odysseus (1918)
- Her Sport (1919)
- The Spinning Ball (1919)
- Ruth's Two Husbands (1919)
- A Drive into the Blue (1919)
- The Living Dead (1919)
- Monika Vogelsang (1920)
- Hundemamachen (1920)
- The Woman in Doctor's Garb (1920)
- The Solemn Oath (1921)
- Seafaring Is Necessary (1921)
- The Three Aunts (1921)
- The Adventure of Doctor Kircheisen (1921)
- Shadows of the Past (1922)
- Felicitas Grolandin (1923)
- To a Woman of Honour (1924)
- The Searching Soul (1925)
- The Woman in the Cupboard (1927)
- Adam and Eve (1928)

== Bibliography ==
- Jung, Uli & Schatzberg, Walter. Beyond Caligari: The Films of Robert Wiene. Berghahn Books, 1999.
