= The Lady and Her Hairdresser =

1922 film directed by Heinz Ullstein

- Directed by: Heinz Ullstein
- Written by: Paul Merzbach; Heinz Ullstein
- Produced by: Richard Oswald; Heinz Ullstein
- Starring: Eugen Rex; Maly Delschaft; Hans Junkermann
- Production companies: Bios-Film; Heinz Ullstein-Film; Richard Oswald-Film
- Distributed by: Bios-Film
- Release date: 17 August 1922
- Country: Germany
- Languages: Silent; German intertitles

The Lady and Her Hairdresser (German: Die Dame und ihr Friseur) is a 1922 German silent comedy film directed by Heinz Ullstein and starring Eugen Rex and Maly Delschaft and Hans Junkermann.

== Cast ==
In alphabetical order

- Paul Bildt as Beamter
- Maly Delschaft
- Hugo Döblin as Papierhändler Hollmann
- Hans Junkermann as Bankier Markus
- Heinrich Peer
- Hermann Picha as Theaterfriseur
- Eugen Rex as Titular-Friseur
- Aenne Ullstein

== Bibliography ==
- Grange, William. Cultural Chronicle of the Weimar Republic. Scarecrow Press, 2008.
