= The Princess of Neutralia =

- Directed by: Rudolf Biebrach
- Written by: Robert Wiene
- Produced by: Oskar Messter
- Starring: Henny Porten; Paul Bildt; Hermann Picha
- Cinematography: Karl Freund
- Music by: Giuseppe Becce
- Production company: Messter Film
- Release date: 1 June 1917
- Country: Germany
- Languages: Silent; German intertitles

The Princess of Neutralia (German: Die Prinzessin von Neutralien) is a 1917 German silent comedy film directed by Rudolf Biebrach and starring Henny Porten, Paul Bildt and Hermann Picha.

== Plot ==
After a wealthy young woman rejects the proposals of 115 suitors, they form a club to try to gain revenge on her.

== Cast ==
- Henny Porten
- Paul Bildt
- Hermann Picha
- Alexander Antalffy
- Julius Falkenstein
- John Gottowt
- Rudolf Biebrach (likely uncredited)

== Bibliography ==
- Jung, Uli & Schatzberg, Walter. Beyond Caligari: The Films of Robert Wiene. Berghahn Books, 1999.
