= Julius Pinschewer =

German film producer

Julius Pinschewer (15 September 1883 Inowroclaw – 16 April 1961 Bern) was a German film producer who specialised in advertising films.

During the First World War, he recognised the potential of propagandistic film use and produced several films advertising war bonds.

In 1930 he married Charlotte Wohlgemuth with whom he had two children.

== Films ==
Date	Name of film	Name in English	Role(s)	genre	
1915	Der Zahnteufel	The Teeth Devil		Short animation	Available online
1925	KIPHO (KIno und PHOtoausstellung)	n/a			Publicity film for the Cinema and Photography exhibition, Berlin
1925	Der Aufstieg	The Ascent	co-directed with Walter Ruttmann	Short animation	Available online The film was made to promote the GeSoLei exhibition
