= The Weapons of Youth =

- Directed by: Friedrich Müller
- Written by: Robert Wiene
- Starring: Gertrud Gräbner; Curt Maler; Hans Staufen
- Cinematography: Charles Paulus
- Production company: Komet Film
- Distributed by: Komet Film
- Release date: 10 January 1913
- Country: Germany
- Languages: Silent; German intertitles

The Weapons of Youth (German: Die Waffen der Jugend) is a 1913 German silent film directed by Friedrich Müller and starring Gertrud Gräbner, Curt Maler and Hans Staufen.

The screenplay was written by the Robert Wiene his first known involvement with films. Wiene later went on to become a leading film director. Some reports suggest that Wiene may have served as a co-director on the film.

== Cast ==
- Gertrud Gräbner
- Curt Maler
- Hans Staufen
- Conrad Wiene

== Bibliography ==
- Jung, Uli & Schatzberg, Walter. Beyond Caligari: The Films of Robert Wiene. Berghahn Books, 1999.
