= Eugen Rex =

German actor

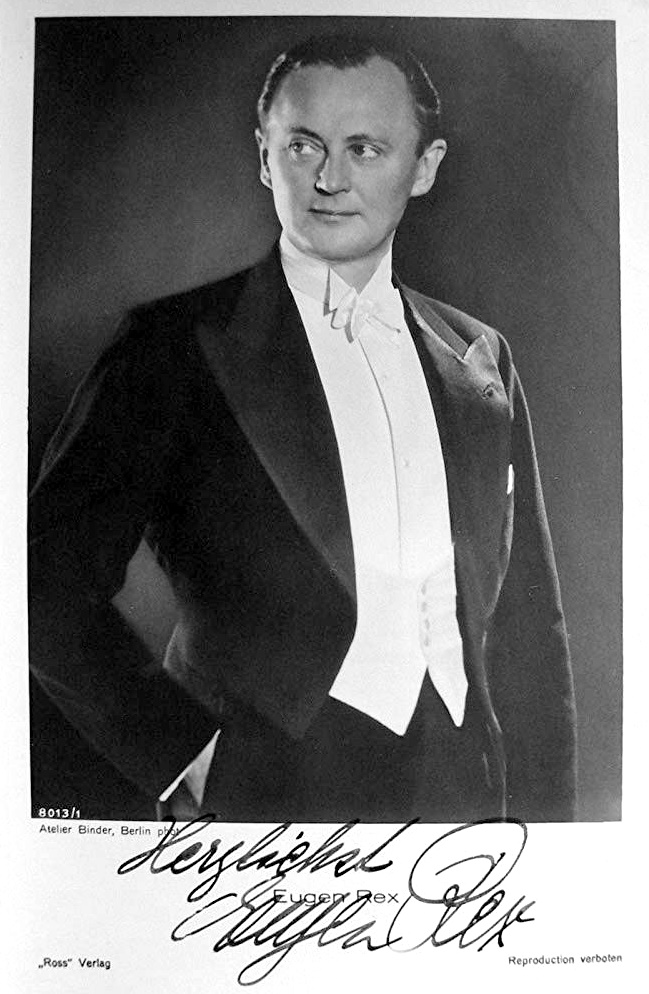
- Born: 8 July 1884; Berlin, German Empire
- Died: 21 February 1943 (aged 58); Berlin, Germany
- Occupation: Actor
- Years active: 1918–1943

Eugen Rex (8 July 1884 – 21 February 1943) was a German actor. Rex was a member of the Nazi Party.

== Selected filmography ==
- The Story of Dida Ibsen (1918) as Lude Schnack
- The Lady, the Devil and the Model (1918) as Fritz
- Ferdinand Lassalle (1918)
- During My Apprenticeship (1919)
- Around the World in Eighty Days (1919) as Passepartout
- The Princess of the Nile (1920) as Assessor Erich
- The Blockhead (1921) as Willibad Beck
- The Forbidden Way (1920) as the bailiff
- The Shadow of Gaby Leed (1921)
- The Solemn Oath (1921)
- The Story of a Maid (1921) as the provincial man
- The Lady and Her Hairdresser (1922) as the titular hairdresser
- The Love Story of Cesare Ubaldi (1922)
- Old Heidelberg (1923) as Kellermann
- Warning Shadows (1923) as the servant
- The Hungarian Princess (1923)
- The Doll Maker of Kiang-Ning (1923)
- Nanon (1924) as Hector de Marsillac
- The Doomed (1924) as Prince D'Orlando
- The Stolen Professor (1924)
- If You Have an Aunt (1925) as Hermann
- Den of Iniquity (1925)
- The Woman from Berlin (1925) as Fritz Lehner
- The Doll of Luna Park (1925)
- Oh Those Glorious Old Student Days (1925)
- The Pride of the Company (1926)
- The World Wants To Be Deceived (1926) as Jones
- Light-Hearted Isabel (1927)
- Cry for Help (1928)
- Sinful and Sweet (1929) as Meunier
- Kasernenzauber (1931)
- When the Soldiers (1931) as the chairman of the Festival Committee
- Shadows of the Underworld (1931) as Commissioner Stückli
- Between Night and Dawn (1931) as the sausage salesman
- Der Kongreß tanzt (1931)
- Sunday of Life (1931)
- Shooting Festival in Schilda (1931)
- Headfirst into Happiness (1931)
- The Office Manager (1931)
- Errant Husbands (1931)
- Bobby Gets Going (1931)
- Road to Rio (1931)
- The Captain from Köpenick (1931)
- Sacred Waters (1932)
- I by Day, You by Night (1932)
- Ship Without a Harbour (1932)
- Spies at the Savoy Hotel (1932)
- The Eleven Schill Officers (1932)
- The Empress and I (1933)
- Little Girl, Great Fortune (1933)
- The Flower of Hawaii (1933)
- The Roberts Case (1933)
- Marion, That's Not Nice (1933)
- The Black Forest Girl (1933)
- Enjoy Yourselves (1934)
- Financial Opportunists (1934)
- Don't Lose Heart, Suzanne! (1935)
- Lessons in Love (1935)
- The Old and the Young King (1935)
- His Late Excellency (1935)
- The Mysterious Mister X (1936)
- Inkognito (1936)
- Men, Animals and Sensations (1938)
- Ursula Under Suspicion (1939)
- Mask in Blue (1943)

== Bibliography ==
- Jung, Uli & Schatzberg, Walter. Beyond Caligari: The Films of Robert Wiene (1999), Berghahn Books, ISBN 1571811567
