= No Sin on the Alpine Pastures (1915 film) =

1915 film directed by Rudolf Biebrach

- Directed by: Rudolf Biebrach
- Written by: Walter Turszinsky
- Produced by: Oskar Messter
- Starring: Henny Porten; Emmy Wyda; Lupu Pick
- Music by: Giuseppe Becce
- Production company: Messter Film
- Distributed by: Hansa Film
- Release date: 1 December 1915
- Running time: 55 minutes
- Country: Germany
- Languages: Silent; German intertitles

No Sin on the Alpine Pastures (German: Auf der Alm, da gibt's ka Sünd) is a 1915 German silent comedy film directed by Rudolf Biebrach and starring Henny Porten, Emmy Wyda, and Lupu Pick. Location shooting took place in the Bavarian town of Bad Reichenhall.

== Cast ==
- Henny Porten as Käte
- Rudolf Biebrach as Kammergerichtsrat Hannemann
- Emmy Wyda as Malchen Hannemann
- Lupu Pick as Seppl
- Max Wilmsen as Dr. Walter Kreuznach
- Karl Harbacher
- Arnold Rieck

== Bibliography ==
- Bock, Hans-Michael & Bergfelder, Tim. The Concise CineGraph. Encyclopedia of German Cinema. Berghahn Books, 2009.
