= Karl Freund =

German film director and cinematographer

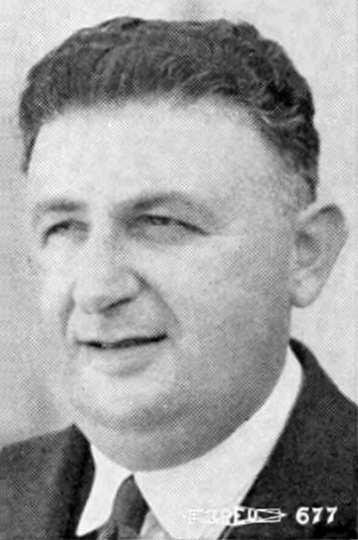
- Karl Freund in 1932
- Born: Karl W. Freund; January 16, 1890; Dvůr Králové, Bohemia, Austria-Hungary
- Died: May 3, 1969 (aged 79); Santa Monica, California, U.S.
- Occupations: Cinematographer; director; camera operator
- Years active: 1907–1960
- Known for: Pioneer of Entfesselte Kamera
- Spouses: Susette Liepmannssohn (m. 1915, divorced); Gertrude Hoffman (m. 1920)
- Children: Gerda Martel

Karl W. Freund, A.S.C. (German: [frɔʏnt]; January 16, 1890 – May 3, 1969) was a German Bohemian and American cinematographer and film director. He is best known for photographing Metropolis (1927), Dracula (1931), and television's I Love Lucy (1951–1957), and for directing The Mummy (1932). Freund was an innovator in the field of cinematography, often noted for pioneering the unchained camera technique, arguably the most important stylistic innovation of the 20th century, setting the stage for some of the most commonly used cinematic techniques of modern contemporary cinema.

== Early life ==
Karl Freund was born in Dvůr Králové, Bohemia. When he was 11, his family moved to Berlin. His career began in 1905 when, at age 15, he was hired as an apprentice projectionist for Alfred Duskes films. In 1907, he began work at the International Cinematograph and Light Effect Society. Freund was drafted by the Imperial Army to fight in World War I, but was released from duty after only three months.

== Early film career ==
Freund began his film career in 1905. He was a newsreel cameraman in 1907 and a year later was working for Sascha-Film in Vienna. In 1911, Freund moved to Belgrade to create a film laboratory for the Brothers Savic. Freund worked as a cinematographer on over 100 films, including the German Expressionist films The Golem (1920) and The Last Laugh (1924). Freund worked with director Fritz Lang on a multiple projects, of which Metropolis (1927) is the best known. Freund co-wrote, and was cinematographer on, Berlin: Symphony of a Metropolis (1927), directed by Walter Ruttmann. Between 1926 and 1929, Freund was the production head at Fox Europa Film.

Freund's only known film as an actor is Carl Theodor Dreyer's Michael (1924) in which he appears as a sycophantic art dealer who saves the tobacco ashes dropped by a famous painter.

== Innovation in cinematography ==
Early in his career Freund began to experiment with different ways of filming and new aspects of film. In 1914 he worked with Oskar Messter, a pioneering inventor and experimenter with sound film technology.

Unchained camera

Karl Freund was a pioneer of the unchained camera. In films such as Der letzte Mann, the unchained camera was a revolution in early film. For the first time, the camera was free of the tripod and could move around the set. Because it was no longer confined to one position, thousands of new shots were possible. Freund was known to wear the camera on his stomach and walk around while it was filming. He would also put the camera on a cart that moved along a track. Several other innovative ways of moving the camera were introduced by Freund, including putting the camera on a crane.

== American film and television career ==
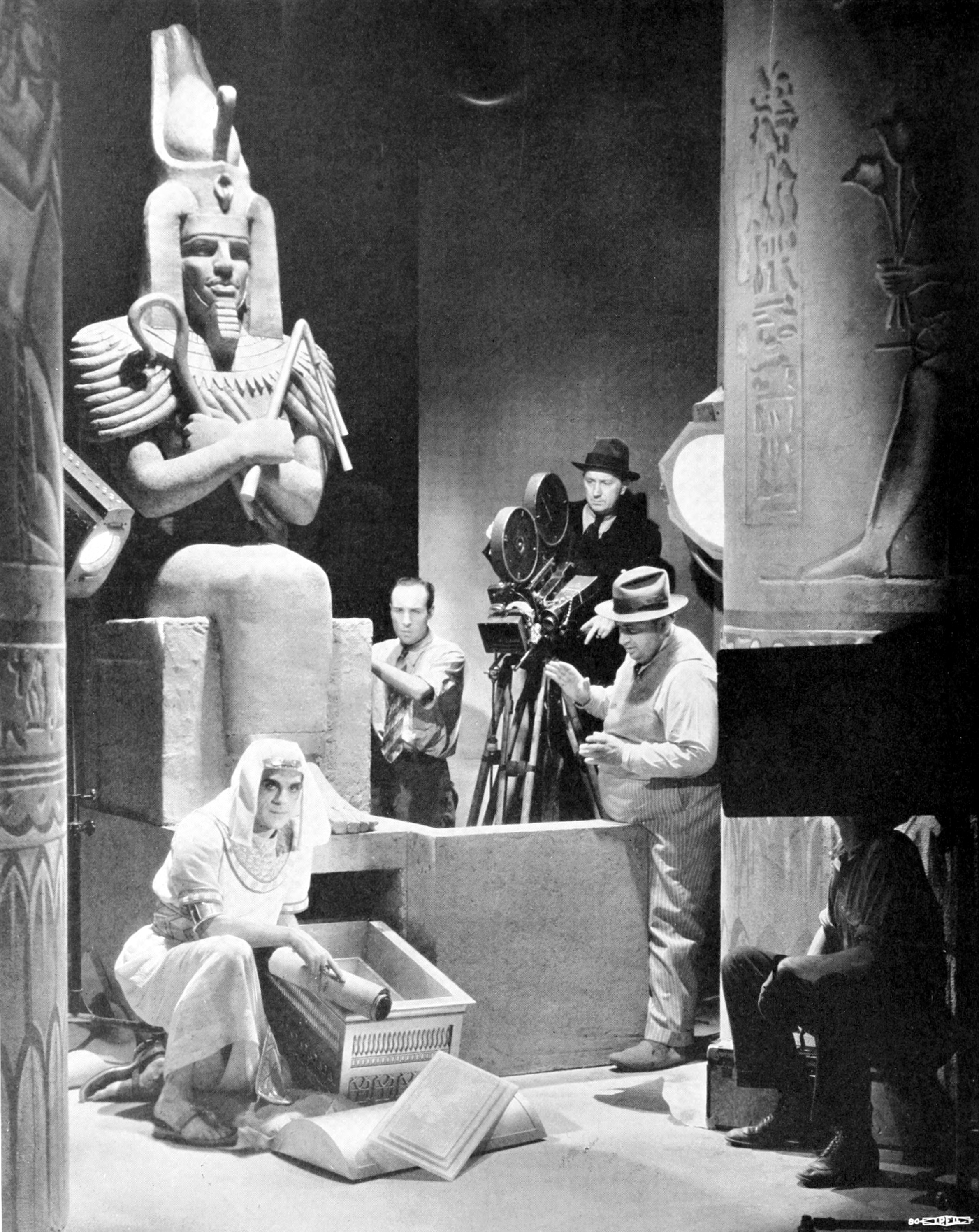
Freund directing Boris Karloff in The Mummy (1932)

Freund immigrated to the United States in 1929, where he continued to shoot well-remembered films such as Dracula (1931) and Key Largo (1948). His work on Dracula came under a mostly disorganized shoot; the usually meticulous director Tod Browning left cinematographer Freund to take over during much of filming, making Freund something of an uncredited director on the film. He won an Academy Award for Best Cinematography for The Good Earth (1937).

Between 1921 and 1935, Freund directed 10 films, notably his two credited horror films, The Mummy (1932) starring Boris Karloff, and his last film as director, Mad Love (1935) starring Peter Lorre. Freund worked under contract for MGM and Warner Bros. In 1944 he founded the Photo Research Corporation of Burbank to manufacture TV cameras and exposure meters.

In an interview, screenwriter Richard Brooks tells a story of his interactions with Freund when they worked on the film Key Largo together. Brooks also recounted useful advice he received from Freund two years later, just before Brooks' directorial debut. Freund gave Brooks reels of 16mm film, calling them "Lesson Number One." When Brooks watched the reels at home, he saw that they were pornography. The next day, Freund explained "I produced them. My pictures, 1922. Many times you will be wondering, do you put the camera here, or up here, or down here? Maybe you make the scene a little bigger, or a little smaller. Lesson Number One. Get to the fucking point."

=== I Love Lucy ===
At the beginning of the 1950s, he was persuaded by Desi Arnaz at Desilu to be the cinematographer for the television series I Love Lucy from 1951. Critics have credited Freund for the show's lustrous black and white cinematography, but more important, Freund designed the "flat lighting" system that became standard for shooting multi-camera sitcoms; this system covers the set in light, thus eliminating shadows and allowing the use of three moving cameras without having to modify the lighting between shots. While Freund did not invent the three-camera shooting system, he did perfect it for use with film cameras in front of a live audience. The cameras that were used were BNC Mitchell cameras with T-stop calibrated lenses on dollies. The center camera was for wider shots. The other two were positioned 75 to 90 degrees away from center and were primarily used for close-ups.

Despite his extensive experience in film cinematography, Freund said that switching to television was a challenge for him. Because I Love Lucy was filmed in front of a live audience there were restrictions on where the camera could be placed.

Freund and his production team also worked on other sitcoms produced at/through Desilu, such as Our Miss Brooks. He retired in 1960.

== Photo Research Corporation ==
In 1941, Freund founded Photo Research Corporation with the intent to develop products to improve the quality of motion picture photography. One early notable product was the Norwood Director direct-reading incident light meter, developed with Donald W. Norwood. After the first model's success, Freund and Norwood parted ways and Photo Research retained rights to produce and improve the model. It was now produced under the Spectra name, with continuing improvement. It was this photometer product and a direct-reading brightness meter that earned Freund two Academy Awards for technical achievement from the Motion Picture Academy of Arts and Sciences.

This Spectra spot brightness meter, Model 1415-UB, became a popular instrument, appearing in many laboratories' catalogs and accompanying 1950s astronauts on the Project ManHigh balloon missions reaching nearly 100,000 ft altitude. Lighting engineer David DiLaura described the meter's import:

In 1952, Karl Freund of Photo Research Corporation produced a luminance meter that eliminated visual photometry [visual photometery is comparing two light sources visually to determine brightness]. Freund borrowed some of the technology that had been developed by William Baum of the Palomar Observatory to measure star luminance. Compact photomultiplier tubes had been developed that could detect very small amounts of light. At the same time, miniature, high sensitivity, low power electrometer amplifier vacuum tubes had become available that could amplify the small signal currents that the photo tubes generated. Freund used this technology as the light detection system in his luminance meter.

Both Spectra and Photo Research are still producing fine measurement equipment. Spectra split off from Photo Research in 1986 as Spectra-Cine Inc. Photo Research currently exists as a subsidiary of Jadak Inc, manufacturing light and color measurement devices. The Photo Research PR-650 spectroradiometer with telescope input and Pritchard viewfinder (viewfinder invented during Freund's time) was for years the standard luminance and color measurement device used in the fields of display manufacture and psychophysiology. Like most laboratory equipment, even the equipment from the 1940s is robust and remains serviceable.

== Personal life ==
Freund married Susette Liepmannssohn in 1915. They had one daughter and later divorced, though sources differ on whether their marriage ended in 1918 or 1920. He married actress Gertrude Hoffmann in 1920. In 1930, Freund was living at the Chateau des Fleurs in Hollywood.

In 1937, Freund visited Germany to bring his daughter to the United States, saving her from almost certain death in the concentration camps. His ex-wife Susette remained in Germany, where she was first imprisoned in Ravensbrück concentration camp and then murdered at the Bernburg Euthanasia Centre in March 1942. Freund's grandson Rod Martel wrote, produced and directed an award-winning documentary titled Lost in Berlin (2020), a narrative history of this time in the Freund family.

Freund died at St. John's Hospital in Santa Monica, California on May 3, 1969, at the age of 79.

== Selected filmography ==
As cinematographer

- The Robber Bride (1916)
- The Queen's Love Letter (1916)
- The Giant's Fist (1917)
- Mountain Air (1917)
- The Princess of Neutralia (1917)
- The Man in the Mirror (1917)
- The Marriage of Luise Rohrbach (1917)
- Countess Kitchenmaid (1918)
- Put to the Test (1918)
- The Victors (1918)
- The Lady, the Devil and the Model (1918)
- The Ringwall Family (1918)
- Precious Stones (1918)
- Agnes Arnau and Her Three Suitors (1918)
- The Blue Lantern (1918)
- Die Arche (1919)
- Prostitution (1919)
- Intoxication (1919)
- The Night at Goldenhall (1920)
- Catherine the Great (1920)
- The Golem (1920)
- Der Januskopf (1920)
- The Oath of Peter Hergatz (1921)
- Children of Darkness (1921)
- The Rats (1921)
- The Story of Christine von Herre (1921)
- Lucrezia Borgia (1922)
- Louise de Lavallière (1922)
- The Last Laugh (1924)
- Michael (1924)
- Variety (1925)
- Tartuffe (1926)
- The Mill at Sanssouci (1926)
- Out of the Mist (1927)
- Doña Juana (1927)
- Metropolis (1927)
- Berlin: Symphony of a Metropolis (1927)
- A Knight in London (1929)
- Fräulein Else (1929)
- Sleeping Partners (1930)
- Bad Sister (1931)
- Dracula (1931)
- Murders in the Rue Morgue (1932)
- Back Street (1932)
- The Kiss Before the Mirror (1933)
- Camille (1936)
- The Good Earth (1937)
- Parnell (1937)
- Conquest (1937)
- Letter of Introduction (1938)
- Man-Proof (1938)
- Tail Spin (1939)
- Golden Boy (1939)
- Rose of Washington Square (1939)
- Balalaika (1939)
- Pride and Prejudice (1940)
- Green Hell (1940)
- Blossoms in the Dust (1941)
- Tortilla Flat (1942)
- Cry "Havoc" (1943)
- A Guy Named Joe (1943)
- Du Barry Was a Lady (1943)
- The Seventh Cross (1944)
- Without Love (1945)
- The Thin Man Goes Home (1945)
- A Letter for Evie (1946)
- Undercurrent (1946)
- Two Smart People (1946)
- That Hagen Girl (1947)
- This Time for Keeps (1947)
- Key Largo (1948)
- South of St. Louis (1949)
- Montana (1950)
- Bright Leaf (1950)

As director

- The Sensational Trial (1923)
- The Mummy (1932)
- Moonlight and Pretzels (1933)
- Madame Spy (1934)
- The Countess of Monte Cristo (1934)
- Uncertain Lady (1934)
- I Give My Love (1934)
- Gift of Gab (1934)
- Mad Love (1935)

As producer

- Madame Wants No Children (1926)

== See also ==
- List of German-speaking Academy Award winners and nominees
