= Arthur Bergen =

Arthur Bergen (24 October 1875 – 1943) was an Austrian Jewish actor and film director. He was murdered at Auschwitz concentration camp during the Holocaust.

== Selected filmography ==
Actor

- The Homecoming of Odysseus (1918)
- The Victors (1918)
- World by the Throat (1920)
- Humanity Unleashed (1920)
- The Oath of Stephan Huller (1921)
- The New Paradise (1921)
- The Golden Plague (1921)
- The False Dimitri (1922)
- Lola Montez, the King's Dancer (1922)
- The Passenger in the Straitjacket (1922)
- The Green Manuela (1923)
- Tragedy in the House of Habsburg (1924)
- Slums of Berlin (1925)
- Fire in the Opera House (1930)
- Panik in Chicago (1931)
- Different Morals (1931)
- Modern Dowry (1932)
- The Mad Bomberg (1932)
- Under False Flag (1932)
- Typhoon (1933)
- Greetings and Kisses, Veronika (1933)
- Today Is the Day (1933)
- The Emperor's Waltz (1933)

Screenwriter

- Lehmann's Honeymoon (1916)

Director

- I Lost My Heart in Heidelberg (1926)
- Poor Little Sif (1927)
- Only a Viennese Woman Kisses Like That (1928)

== Bibliography ==
- Jung, Uli & Schatzberg, Walter. Beyond Caligari: The Films of Robert Wiene. Berghahn Books, 1999.
