= The Man in the Mirror (1917 film) =

- Directed by: Robert Wiene
- Written by: Richard Wurmfeld; Robert Wiene
- Produced by: Oskar Messter
- Starring: Maria Fein; Bruno Decarli; Emil Rameau
- Cinematography: Karl Freund
- Music by: Giuseppe Becce
- Production company: Messter Film
- Distributed by: Hansa Film
- Release date: October 1917
- Country: Germany
- Languages: Silent; German intertitles

The Man in the Mirror (German: Der Mann im Spiegel) is a 1917 German silent drama film directed by Robert Wiene and starring Maria Fein, Bruno Decarli and Emil Rameau.

== Plot ==
A man seeks revenge on a prince who seduced his sister, and ends up killing him.

== Cast ==
- Maria Fein
- Bruno Decarli
- Emil Rameau
- Alexander Antalffy

== Bibliography ==
- Jung, Uli & Schatzberg, Walter. Beyond Caligari: The Films of Robert Wiene. Berghahn Books, 1999.
