= Der neue Schreibtisch =

1913 German film

The New Desk
- Directed by: Karl Valentin
- Produced by: Peter Ostermeier
- Starring: Karl Valentin
- Release date: 1913
- Running time: 13 minutes
- Country: German Empire
- Languages: Silent film German intertitles

Der Neue Schreibtisch (English: The New Writing Desk) is a short German comedy film made in 1913. In the plot a busy businessman tries to get comfortable at his new desk, so he starts cutting off parts of the legs, but eventually shortens the legs off entirely.
