= Henny Porten =

German actress and film producer

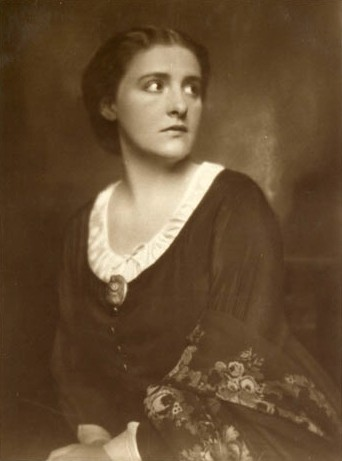
- Porten, c. 1920s
- Born: Frieda Ulricke Porten; 7 January 1890; Magdeburg, German Empire
- Died: 15 October 1960 (aged 70); West Berlin, West Germany
- Occupations: Actress, film producer
- Years active: 1906–1955
- Spouses: Curt A. Stark (m. 1912; died 1916) Wilhelm von Kaufmann (m. 1921; died 1959)
- Parents: Franz Porten; Wincenzia Wybiral
- Relatives: Rosa Porten (sister); Fritz Porten (brother)

Frieda Ulricke "Henny" Porten (7 January 1890 – 15 October 1960) was a German actress and film producer of the silent era, and Germany's first major film star. She appeared in more than 170 films between 1906 and 1955.

== Biography ==
Frieda Ulricke Porten was born in Magdeburg, in what was then the German Empire. Her father, Franz Porten, was also an actor and film director, as was her older sister Rosa Porten.

In the 1910s she worked actively in film, becoming, along with Asta Nielsen, the first German film star. She was one of the few German actresses of the era to enter film without having stage experience. Many of her earlier films were directed by her husband Curt A. Stark, who died during World War I in Transylvania on the Eastern Front in 1916.

Porten founded in 1919 a film production company of her own, which in 1924 merged with the signature of Carl Froelich. Also in 1919, Irrungen was filmed, in which criticism of a social nature was exposed. The same year she acted in the version of the work of Gerhart Hauptmann Rose Bernd. In 1920 she achieved great success with two films directed by Ernst Lubitsch, Anna Boleyn (starring Emil Jannings) and Kohlhiesels Töchter. In 1921 she continued working with renowned directors, highlighting the production directed by Ewald André Dupont Die Geierwally, Hintertreppe (1921), by Leopold Jessner, and the 1923 film by Robert Wiene I.N.R.I. She starred in the 1924 film Gräfin Donelli, which was directed by Georg Wilhelm Pabst.

The actress at first was skeptical about sound movies, but finally worked with the new medium, debuting in 1930 with the film Skandal um Eva.

On 24 June 1921, she remarried, to Wilhelm von Kaufmann (1888–1959), a doctor of Jewish origin, then director of the Sanatorium "Wiggers Kurheim", in Garmisch-Partenkirchen, who thereafter took charge of the production of Porten's films. When the Nazis took power and she refused to divorce her Jewish husband, she found that her career, while doing twelve films a year, dissolved immediately. When she resolved on emigration, she was denied an exit visa to prevent a negative impression. She made ten films during the Nazi era. Her placid and reassuring persona helped calm audiences confronted with Allied bombardment. In 1944, after an aerial mine destroyed her home, she and her husband were out on the streets, as it was forbidden to shelter a 'full Jew'. After the Second World War, Porten made two films for the East German DEFA studios.

Henny Porten died in West Berlin, West Germany, in 1960. She was buried in the Kaiser-Wilhelm-Gedächtnis Cemetery in Berlin.

In 1960, she was awarded the Order of Merit of the Federal Republic of Germany.

== Fame ==
It was in The Porcelain of Meissner (1906), that Henny Porten made her first appearance in the cinema. It was a modest role in a sound film, very short, that her father, Franz Porten, directed for Oskar Messter. In 1907, after finishing her studies at the De Múgica College for Elderly Daughters, the young Porten became a professional actress and worked with the Deutsche Mutoskop und Biograph GmbH before signing an exclusive contract with Messter and starring in the film Lohengrin (1910), based on the opera in three acts by Richard Wagner. Although without great box office success at first, its striking appearance and simple style of acting exerted a magnetic effect for the public.

It was with the film The Love of a Blind Girl (1910), that Henny became the first diva in German cinema. In 1912 she appeared in Love Masked, the first feature film of the Messters-Projection GmbH, Berlin, which followed a hundred films until 1918. This is why her name is identified with the rise of the German film industry.

== "Messter's girl" ==
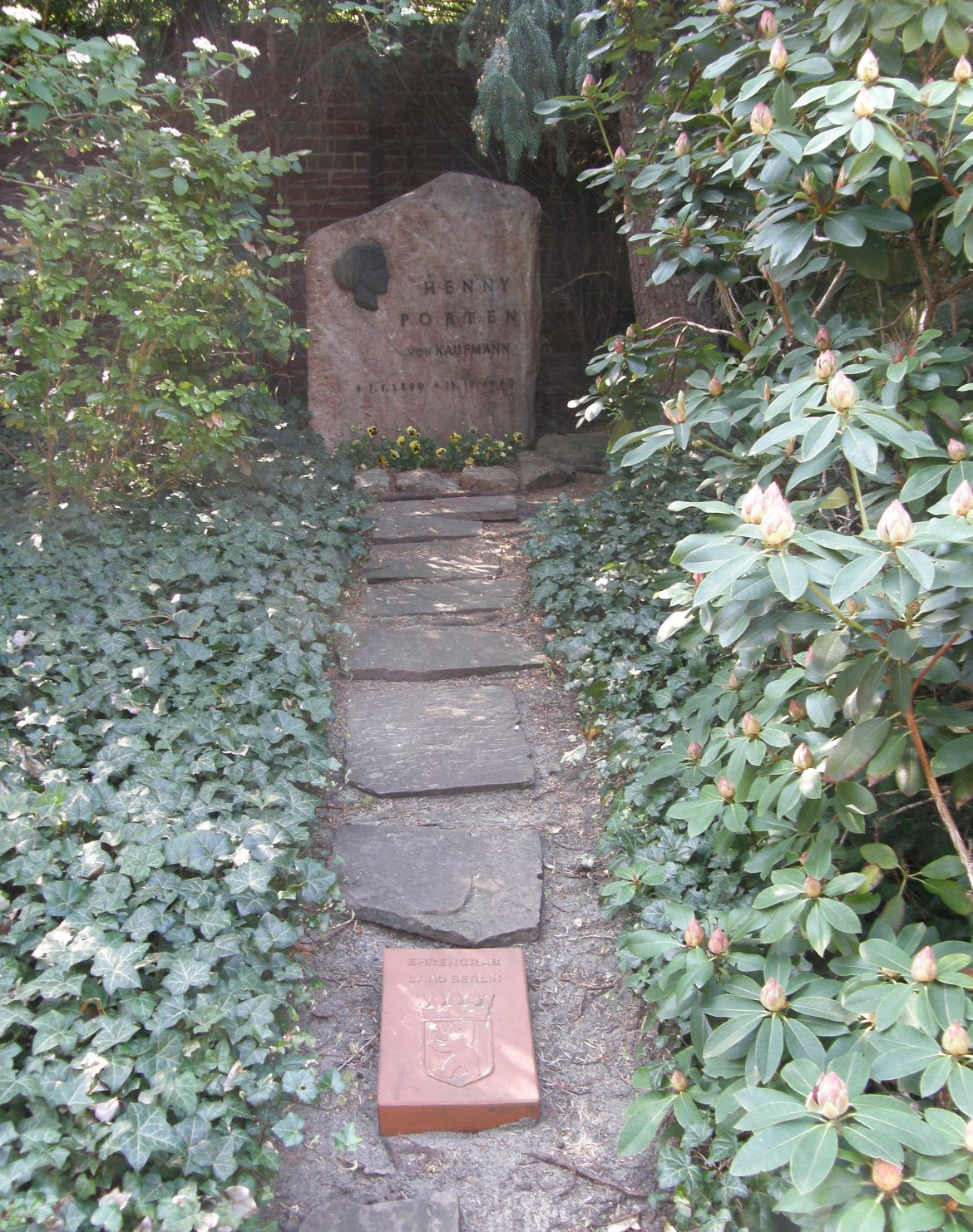
Porten's grave at the Kaiser Wilhelm Memorial Cemetery in Berlin.

The first German film producers refused to reveal the names of the actors in their films, fearing that they would be charged more money. Hence, Henny Porten was not known by name but by the epithet of the "Messter's girl". But in 1910, when Henny acted in the melodrama The Love of a Blind Girl with such success, Messter was forced to make known to the public the name of his interpreter. And immediately, the actress asked for a raise.

== Characters played ==
The characters that Henny Porten played in her films, emerged from the daily life of the people and allowed German viewers to recognize familiar structures for them. Almost always, they were stories taken from serial novels taken from magazines. Therefore, the artistic and intellectual circles of the country described the actress as "the star of the common people." As a symbol of everything that the cultural elites despised from the lower class. These same circles attributed the popularity of Henny to her personification of the traditional image of the German woman: a placid, voluptuous, but not erotic blonde, who embodied values such as self-sacrifice, indulgence and submission. Porten was faithful to this characterization from 1910 until the end of the silent film era.

Henny Porten used to play women who found fulfillment in serving others and in self-sacrifice, who indulged in submission even against their will. In these films they exposed the social repression that patriarchy exercised over women, showed how women with extramarital relationships or who were single mothers were separated from social life, and showed unequal competition between men and women at work.

== Selected filmography ==
- Alexandra (1914)
- No Sin on the Alpine Pastures (1915)
- The Robber Bride (1916)
- The Queen's Love Letter (1916)
- The Wandering Light (1916)
- Imprisoned Soul (1917)
- Mountain Air (1917)
- The Princess of Neutralia (1917)
- The Giant's Fist (1917)
- The Marriage of Luise Rohrbach (1917)
- Countess Kitchenmaid (1918)
- The Victors (1918)
- Precious Stones (1918)
- The Blue Lantern (1918)
- The Ringwall Family (1918)
- Agnes Arnau and Her Three Suitors (1918)
- The Lady, the Devil and the Model (1918)
- Put to the Test (1918)
- The Homecoming of Odysseus (1918)
- Her Sport (1919)
- Ruth's Two Husbands (1919)
- A Drive into the Blue (1919)
- The Living Dead (1919)
- Rose Bernd (1919)
- Anna Boleyn (1920)
- The Golden Crown (1920)
- Monika Vogelsang (1920)
- Kohlhiesel's Daughters (1920)
- The Vulture Wally (1921)
- Backstairs (1921)
- She and the Three (1922)
- The Ancient Law (1923)
- Inge Larsen (1923)
- I.N.R.I. (1923)
- The Love of a Queen (1923)
- The Secret of Brinkenhof (1923)
- The Merchant of Venice (1923)
- Countess Donelli (1924)
- Prater (1924)
- Mother and Child (1924)
- The Adventures of Sybil Brent (1925)
- Tragedy (1925)
- The Golden Calf (1925)
- Chamber Music (1925)
- When She Starts, Look Out (1926)
- Roses from the South (1926)
- The Flames Lie (1926)
- The Long Intermission (1927)
- My Aunt, Your Aunt (1927)
- Lotte (1928)
- Love in the Cowshed (1928)
- Violantha (1928)
- Escape (1928)
- The Woman Everyone Loves Is You (1929)
- German Wine (1929)
- A Mother's Love (1929)
- The Mistress and her Servant (1929)
- Scandalous Eva (1930)
- Kohlhiesel's Daughters (1930)
- Louise, Queen of Prussia (1931)
- 24 Hours in the Life of a Woman (1931)
- Mother and Child (1934)
- Trouble Backstairs (1935)
- The Optimist (1938)
- The Comedians (1941)
- When the Young Wine Blossoms (1943)
- The Buchholz Family (1944)
- Marriage of Affection (1944)
- Unknown Sender (1950)
- Carola Lamberti – Eine vom Zirkus (1954)
- Das Fräulein von Scuderi (1955)
