= Arnold Rieck =

German actor, humorist, and singer

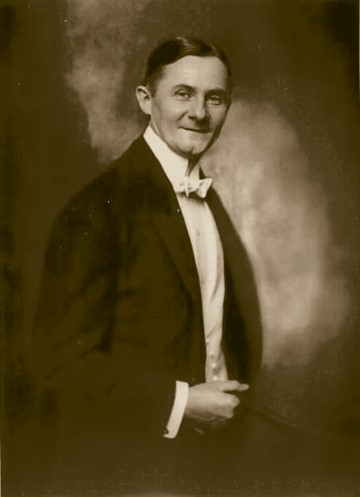
- Born: 22 June 1876; Berlin, German Empire
- Died: 7 November 1924 (aged 48); Leipzig, Weimar Republic
- Occupations: Actor, singer, humorist
- Years active: 1897–1942

Arnold Rieck (22 June 1876 – 7 November 1924) was a German stage and film actor, humorist, and singer.

== Selected filmography ==
- No Sin on the Alpine Pastures (1915)
- Lehmann's Honeymoon (1916)
- Frau Lenes Scheidung (1917)
- Der Vetter aus Mexiko (1917)
- Der Vorstadt Caruso (1920)
- Killemann hat 'nen Klaps (1920)
- Yvette, the Fashion Princess (1922)
- Two Worlds (1922)
- The Woman on the Panther (1923)
- Mother and Child (1924)

== Bibliography ==
- Jung, Uli & Schatzberg, Walter. Beyond Caligari: The Films of Robert Wiene. Berghahn Books, 1999.
