= Giuseppe Becce =

Italian composer (1877–1973)

- Born: 2 February 1877; Lonigo, Veneto, Italy
- Died: 5 October 1973 (aged 96); West Berlin, West Germany
- Occupation: Composer
- Years active: 1913-1959 (film)

Giuseppe Becce (3 February 1877 – 5 October 1973) was an Italian-born film score composer who enriched the German cinema.

== Biography ==
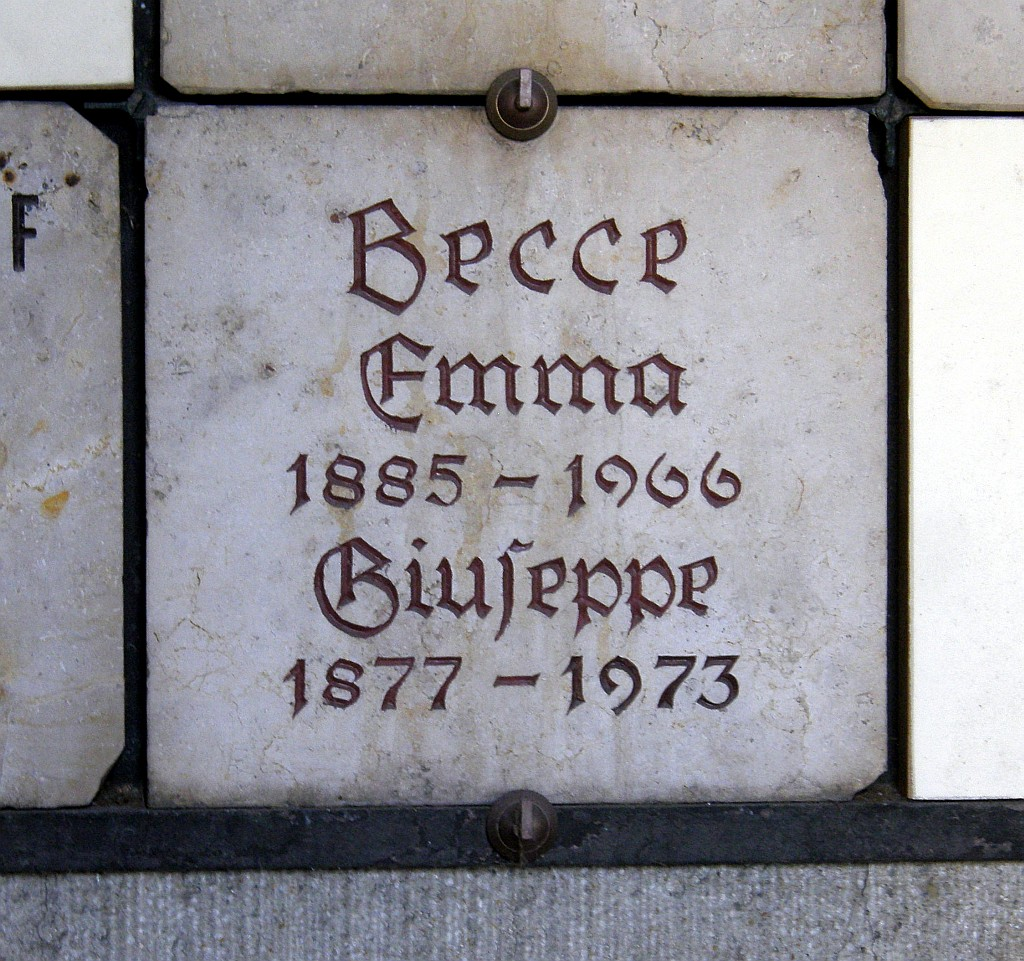
Grave of Giuseppe Becce in the columbarium at the Friedhof Wilmersdorf in Berlin

Becce was born in Lonigo, province of Vicenza, Italy. He showed his musical talents early and was named the director of the student musical orchestra at the Pollini Conservatoire in Padua where he studied 'cello and flute, along with geography and philology. In 1906 he moved to Germany and studied musical composition with Arthur Nikisch and Ferruccio Busoni in Berlin. In the 1913 silent movie Richard Wagner, directed by Carl Froelich, Becce played the title role and wrote the accompanying music (see also List of films about Richard Wagner.) He continued to write such music for a series of subsequent movies. A collection of these pieces, the so-called "Kinothek" was published between 1919 and 1933 by the Verlag Schlesinger'sche Buchhandlung in Berlin.

From 1915 to 1923, Becce was the director of the little orchestra of the Berlin Mozartsaal cinema, located upstairs at the Neues Schauspielhaus in the Nollendorfplatz. After World War I, he was named to direct the music department of the Decla-Bioscop AG and chief director of its movie orchestra, later to become the Universum Film AG (UFA) orchestra. He also worked at major movie theatres as director of the orchestras, among them the Ufa-Pavillon am Nollendorfplatz in 1921, the Tauentzien-Palast from 1923, and the Gloria Palast from 1926. In this position he worked with the famous directors of the German silent movie era, namely Fritz Lang, Friedrich Wilhelm Murnau, Georg Wilhelm Pabst, Ernst Lubitsch, Ludwig Berger, Joe May and Berthold Viertel; he arranged and composed music for their movies. In 1920 Becce published the magazine Film-Ton-Kunst. In 1927 he published, together with Hans Erdmann and Ludwig Brav, the Allgemeines Handbuch der Filmmusik; it was based on his Kinothek, amongst other items, and enabled the pianist of silent movies to accompany movies in the generalized style and motifs of renowned composers.

With the arrival of sound movies Becce worked on musical movies and movies covering opera or operetta themes. He worked with Leni Riefenstahl, Luis Trenker, and Harald Reinl whose mountain films he scored. Becce was very prolific providing music to movies for more than four decades; he commonly mixed his own compositions with creations of other composers.

Becce died in Berlin and is buried in the cemetery of Friedhof Wilmersdorf, Berliner Straße.

== Selected filmography ==
- Richard Wagner (dir. Carl Froelich, 1913)
- No Sin on the Alpine Pastures (1915)
- Frau Eva (1916)
- The Robber Bride (1916)
- The Queen's Love Letter (1916)
- Mountain Air (1917)
- The Man in the Mirror (1917)
- The Marriage of Luise Rohrbach (1917)
- The Giant's Fist (1917)
- The Princess of Neutralia (1917)
- Countess Kitchenmaid (1918)
- The Salamander Ruby (1918)
- The Blue Lantern (1918)
- Father and Son (1918)
- The Lady, the Devil and the Model (1918)
- Doctor Schotte (1918)
- Agnes Arnau and Her Three Suitors (1918)
- The Adventure of a Ball Night (1918)
- The Victors (1918)
- Precious Stones (1918)
- Put to the Test (1918)
- The Ringwall Family (1918)
- The Son of Hannibal (1918)
- Her Sport (1919)
- A Drive into the Blue (1919)
- The Living Dead (1919)
- Ruth's Two Husbands (1919)
- Rose Bernd (1919)
- The Cabinet of Dr. Caligari (1920)
- Monika Vogelsang (1920)
- Mascotte (1920)
- Christian Wahnschaffe (1920)
- Hamlet (1921)
- The Vulture Wally (1921)
- Shattered (dir. Lupu Pick, 1921)
- Destiny (dir. Fritz Lang, 1921)
- Sodom and Gomorrah (dir. Michael Curtiz, 1922)
- The Stone Rider (dir. Fritz Wendhausen, 1923)
- Der letzte Mann (dir. Friedrich Wilhelm Murnau, 1924)
- Comedy of the Heart (1924)
- The Wonderful Adventure (1924)
- The Other Woman (1924)
- Peter the Pirate (1925)
- Destiny (1925)
- The Telephone Operator (1925)
- One Minute to Twelve (1925)
- Shadows of the Metropolis (1925)
- Wege zu Kraft und Schönheit (dir. Nicholas Kaufmann and Wilhelm Prager, 1925)
- The Fiddler of Florence (1926)
- The Last Horse Carriage in Berlin (1926)
- People to Each Other (1926)
- Tartüff (dir. Friedrich Wilhelm Murnau, 1926)
- Uneasy Money (dir. Berthold Viertel, 1926)
- Secrets of a Soul (dir. Georg Wilhelm Pabst, 1926)
- Am Rande der Welt (dir. Karl Grune, 1927)
- The Catwalk (1927)
- Heaven on Earth (1927)
- Queen of the Boulevards (1927)
- Always Be True and Faithful (1927)
- Doña Juana (1927)
- The Prince of Pappenheim (1927)
- Leontine's Husbands (1928)
- The Secret Courier (1928)
- Folly of Love (1928)
- The Last Night (1928)
- The Serfs (1928)
- Sajenko the Soviet (1928)
- The Burning Heart (1929)
- Fight of the Tertia (1929)
- The Woman One Longs For (dir. Curtis Bernhardt, 1929)
- The Son of the White Mountain (1930)
- Scandalous Eva (dir. Georg Wilhelm Pabst, 1930)
- Mountains on Fire (dir. Karl Hartl and Luis Trenker, 1931)
- Different Morals (dir. Gerhard Lamprecht, 1931)
- Between Night and Dawn (1931)
- The Four from Bob 13 (1932)
- The Rebel (1932)
- Under False Flag (1932)
- Raid in St. Pauli (dir. Werner Hochbaum, 1932)
- Das Blaue Licht (dir. Leni Riefenstahl, 1932)
- Ekstase (dir. Gustav Machatý, 1933)
- The Marathon Runner (1933)
- The Peak Scaler (1933)
- Spies at Work (1933)
- Hans Westmar. Einer von vielen (dir. Franz Wenzler, 1933)
- The Eternal Dream (dir. Arnold Fanck, 1934)
- Peer Gynt (1934)
- The Prodigal Son (dir. Luis Trenker, 1934)
- Artist Love (1935)
- Hundred Days (1935)
- Miracle of Flight (1935)
- The Hour of Temptation (1936)
- Der Kaiser von Kalifornien (1936)
- Madame Bovary (1937)
- The Voice of the Heart (1937)
- Der Berg ruft (dir. Luis Trenker, 1938)
- Woman in the River (1939)
- The Fire Devil (1940)
- With the Eyes of a Woman (1942)
- Much Ado About Nixi (dir. Erich Engel, 1942)
- Clarissa (1941)
- The Jester's Supper (1942)
- The White Angel (1943)
- The Courier of the King (1947)
- Mountain Crystal (dir. Harald Reinl, 1949)
- Veronika the Maid (1951)
- Night on Mont Blanc (dir. Harald Reinl, 1951)
- Road to Home (1952)
- Behind Monastery Walls (1952)
- The Crucifix Carver of Ammergau (dir. Harald Reinl, 1952)
- Marriage Strike (1953)
- Young Heart Full of Love (1953)
- Tiefland (dir. Leni Riefenstahl, 1954)
- Das Schweigen im Walde (dir. Helmut Weiss, 1955)
- Der Edelweißkönig (dir. Gustav Ucicky, 1957)

== List of Kinothek works ==
(by reference number)

- Kinothek 11 – Situazione Pericolosa (Agitato)
- Kinothek 12 – Emotional Conflict (Sostenuto)
- Kinothek 13 – Battle-Tumult-Blaze (Allegro Agitato)
- Kinothek 14 – Tragic Moments (Andanted Mosso)
- Kinothek 15 – Agony of the Soul (Tragedia dell'Anima)
- Kinothek 16 – Insequimento E Fuga (Agitato)
- Kinothek 17 – Largo Tragico
- Kinothek 18 – Notte Misteriosa (Sinister)
- Kinothek 19 – Grave Humor (Intermezzo Serio)
- Kinothek 20 – Patience Under Pain (Resignation)
- Kinothek 21 – In a Critical Situation (Allegro Agitato)
- Kinothek 22 – Agitato Misterioso
- Kinothek 23 – The Hour of Ghosts (Heavy Mysterious)
- Kinothek 24 – Battle and Disturbance (Agitato)
- Kinothek 25 – Andante Appassionato
- Kinothek 26 – Mob-Rule (Agitato)
- Kinothek 27 – Fanatic Derwish Dance
- Kinothek 28 – Lynch-Law (Agitato)
- Kinothek 29 – Disperazione (Molto Largo-Agitato-Largo)
- Kinothek 30 – Sinister Agitato
- Kinothek 31 – Insurrezione (Agitato Vivace)
- Kinothek 32 – Grand Appassionato
- Kinothek 33 – Facing Death (Andante, Largo)
- Kinothek 34 – Semi Oriental Maetoso
- Kinothek 35 – A Critical Moment (Vivace)
- Kinothek 41 – Cryptic Shadows (Agitato Mysterioso)
- Kinothek 42 – Dramatic Climax
- Kinothek 43 – Wild Chase (Allegro Vivace)
- Kinothek 44 – Threatening Danger (Andante Dramatic)
- Kinothek 45 – Happy Ending (Andante Largo)
- Kinothek 46 – Infatuation (Andante Largo)
- Kinothek 47 – Witchcraft (Semi Mysteriou Andante)
- Kinothek 48 – Anticipation of Danger
- Kinothek 49 – Emotional Climax
- Kinothek 50 – Chariot Race

== Other musical works ==
- 1910 "Das Bett der Pompadour", operetta
- 1912 "Tullia", opera.

== Literature ==
- Hans Erdmann, Giuseppe Becce, Ludwig Brav: Allgemeines Handbuch der Film-Musik. Schlesinger'sche Buchh., Berlin-Licherfelde 1927.
- Film-Ton-Kunst. Eine Zeitschrift für die künstlerische Musikillustration des Lichtbildes. Gegr. v. G. Becce. Schlesinger'sche Buchhandlung, Berlin 1.1920–6.1927.
