= Robert Wiene =

German film director (1873–1938)

- Robert Wiene in the early 1930s
- Born: 27 April 1873; Breslau, Silesia, German Empire
- Died: 17 July 1938 (aged 65); Paris, France
- Occupations: Film director; screenwriter; producer
- Years active: 1913–1938
- Relatives: Conrad Wiene (brother)

Robert Wiene (German: [ˈviːnə]; 27 April 1873 – 17 July 1938) was a German film director, screenwriter and producer, active during the silent era. He is widely-known for directing the landmark 1920 film The Cabinet of Dr. Caligari and a succession of other expressionist films. Wiene also directed a variety of other films of varying styles and genres. Following the Nazi rise to power in Germany, Wiene, who was of Jewish descent, fled into exile.

== Biography ==
=== Early life ===
Robert Wiene was born in Breslau, in the German Province of Silesia (now the city of Wrocław in Poland), as the elder son of the successful theatre actor Karl Wiene. His younger brother Conrad also became an actor. Wiene spent his childhood in various cities throughout Central and Western Europe, including Vienna, Stuttgart, Dresden and Prague.

Prior to his directing career, Wiene had studied law at the University of Berlin and, from 1895, at the University of Vienna. He practiced law in Weimar until 1908, when he moved back to Vienna to manage a theatre company. During this time, he also acted, in small parts on the stage.

=== Career in Austria and Germany ===
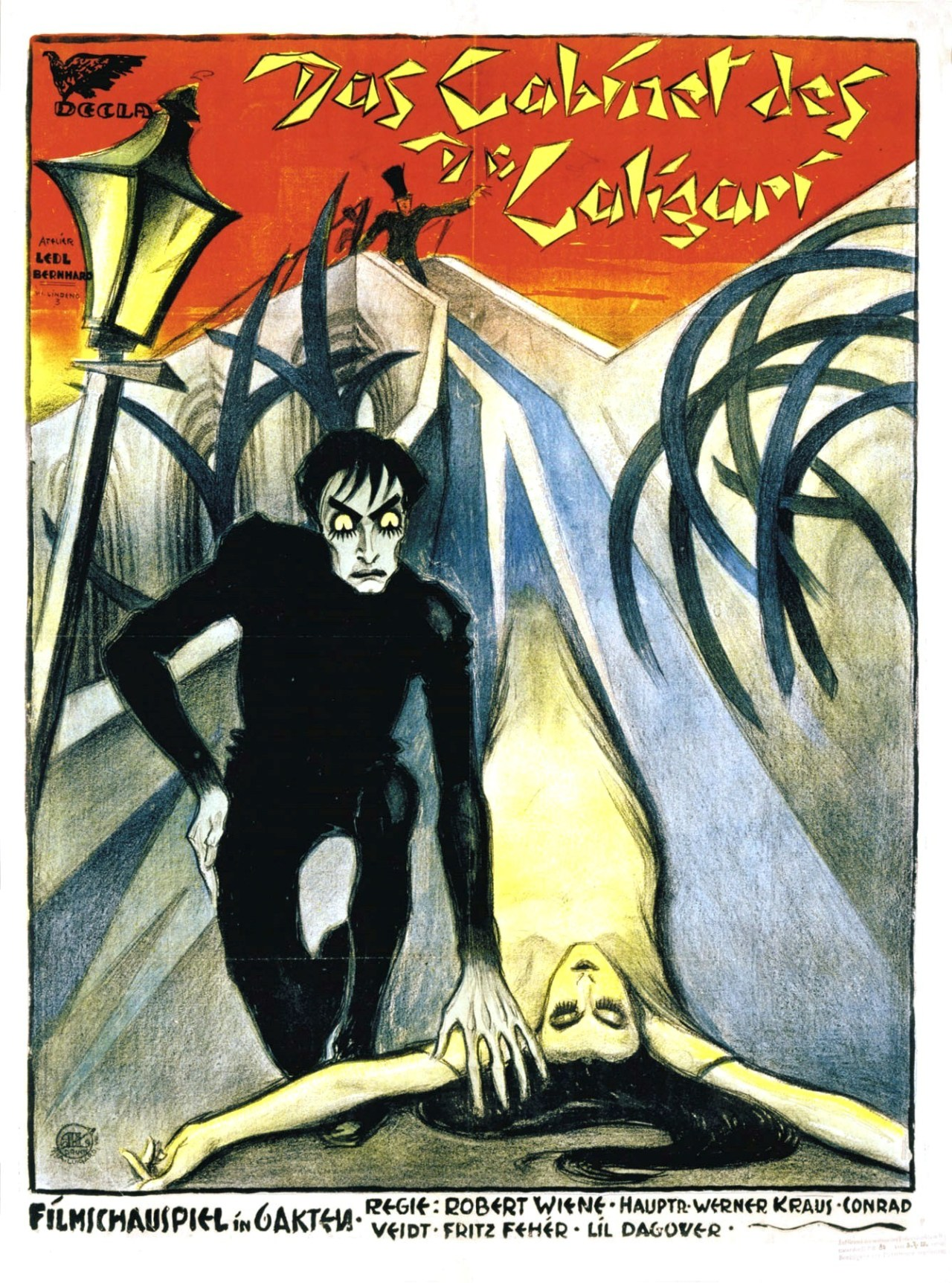
The Cabinet of Dr. Caligari (1920)

His first involvement with film was in 1912, writing and (possibly) directing Die Waffen der Jugend. In 1919, he co-founded with Heinz Hanus the Filmbund (Film Union), a professional association of Austrian filmmakers and one of the first organizations of its kind in Europe.

His most memorable feature films are the horror film The Cabinet of Dr. Caligari (1920) and Raskolnikow (1923), an adaptation of Dostoyevsky's Crime and Punishment, both of which had a deep influence on the German cinema of that time.

=== Exile and death ===
Four months after the Nazis took power, Wiene's latest film, Taifun, was banned on 3 May 1933. A Hungarian film company had been inviting German directors to come to Budapest to make films in simultaneous German/Hungarian versions, and given his uncertain career prospects under the new German regime Wiene took up that offer in September to direct "One Night in Venice" (1934). Wiene went later to London, and finally to Paris where together with Jean Cocteau he tried to produce a sound remake of The Cabinet of Dr. Caligari.

Wiene never returned to Germany, although the reason is unclear. Although one German obituary identified him as a Jew, he had identified himself as a Protestant in Viennese university and residence records from 1894 through 1925. In addition, Wiene had adapted from a novel and directed the 1923 silent religious film I.N.R.I., depicting in a conventional way the events preceding the crucifixion of Christ.

Wiene died in Paris ten days before the end of production of a spy film, Ultimatum, after having suffered from cancer. The film was finished by Wiene's friend Robert Siodmak.

== Selected filmography ==
Only about 20 of the more than 90 movies in which Robert Wiene collaborated still exist:

=== Director ===
- 1912 Die Waffen der Jugend (The Weapons of Youth) {probably co-director of Friedrich Müller}
- 1914 Er rechts, sie links (He Right, She Left)
- 1915 Die Konservenbraut (The Canned Bride)
- 1915 Der springende Hirsch oder Die Diebe von Günsterburg (The Leaping Stag) (directed together with Walter Turszinsky)
- 1916 Höhen und Tiefen (Highs and Lows) {Short film}
- 1916 Frau Eva (Mrs. Eva)
- 1916 Der Liebesbrief der Königin (The Queen's Love Letter)
- 1916 Der Sekretär der Königin (The Queen's Secretary)
- 1916 Das wandernde Licht (The Wandering Light)
- 1916 Die Räuberbraut (The Robber Bride)
- 1916 Der Mann im Spiegel (The Man in the Mirror)
- 1916 Lehmanns Brautfahrt (Lehmann's Honeymoon)
- 1917 Das Leben ein Traum (Life Is a Dream)
- 1917 Der standhafte Benjamin (Steadfast Benjamin)
- 1917 Veilchen Nr. 4 (Violet no. 4) {probably director}
- 1917 Furcht (Fear)
- 1920 Das Cabinet des Dr. Caligari (The Cabinet of Dr. Caligari)
- 1920 Die drei Tänze der Mary Wilford (The Three Dances of Mary Wilford)
- 1920 Genuine (Genuine)
- 1920 Die Nacht der Königin Isabeau (The Night of Queen Isabeau)
- 1920 Der Schrecken im Hause Ardon (Panic in the House of Ardon)
- 1921 Die Rache einer Frau (A Woman's Revenge)
- 1922 Die höllische Macht (The Infernal Power)
- 1923 Raskolnikow (Raskolnikow)
- 1923 Der Puppenmacher von Kiang-Ning (The Doll Maker of Kiang-Ning)
- 1923 I.N.R.I. (I.N.R.I.)
- 1924 Orlac's Hände (The Hands of Orlac)
- 1924 Pension Groonen (Boarding House Groonen)
- 1925 Der Leibgardist (= Der Gardeoffizier) (The Guardsman)
- 1926 Der Rosenkavalier (Der Rosenkavalier)
- 1926 Die Königin vom Moulin Rouge (The Queen of Moulin Rouge)
- 1927 Die Geliebte (The Mistress)
- 1927 Die berühmte Frau (The Famous Woman)
- 1928 Die Frau auf der Folter (The Woman on the Rack)
- 1928 Leontines Ehemänner (Leontine's Husbands)
- 1928 Die grosse Abenteuerin (The Great Adventuress)
- 1928 Unfug der Liebe (Folly of Love)
- 1930 Der Andere (The Other)
- 1930 Le procureur Hallers (The Prosecutor Hallers)
- 1931 Nuits de Venise (co-director Pierre Billon)
- 1931 Der Liebesexpress (The Love Express)
- 1931 Panik in Chicago (Panic in Chicago)
- 1933 Polizeiakte 909 (= Taifun) (Typhoon)
- 1934 Eine Nacht in Venedig (One Night in Venice)
- 1938 Ultimatum (Ultimatum) (finished after his death by Robert Siodmak)

=== Writer ===
- The Weapons of Youth (1913)
- The Marriage of Luise Rohrbach (1917)
- Frank Hansen's Fortune (1917)
- Imprisoned Soul (1917)
- The Princess of Neutralia (1917)
- Countess Kitchenmaid (1918)
- The Blue Lantern (1918)
- The Ringwall Family (1918)
- Put to the Test (1918)
- Precious Stones (1918)
- The Lady, the Devil and the Model (1918)
- Agnes Arnau and Her Three Suitors (1918)
- The Homecoming of Odysseus (1918)
- Her Sport (1919)
- The Man of Action (1919)
- Victim of Society (1919)
- A Drive into the Blue (1919)
- The Living Dead (1919)
- Ruth's Two Husbands (1919)
- Diamonds (1920)
- Monika Vogelsang (1920)
- The Adventure of Doctor Kircheisen (1921)
- The Power of Darkness (1924)
- The Guardsman (1925)
- Strauss Is Playing Today (1928)
- Typhoon (1933)
