= Oskar Messter =

German cinema pioneer

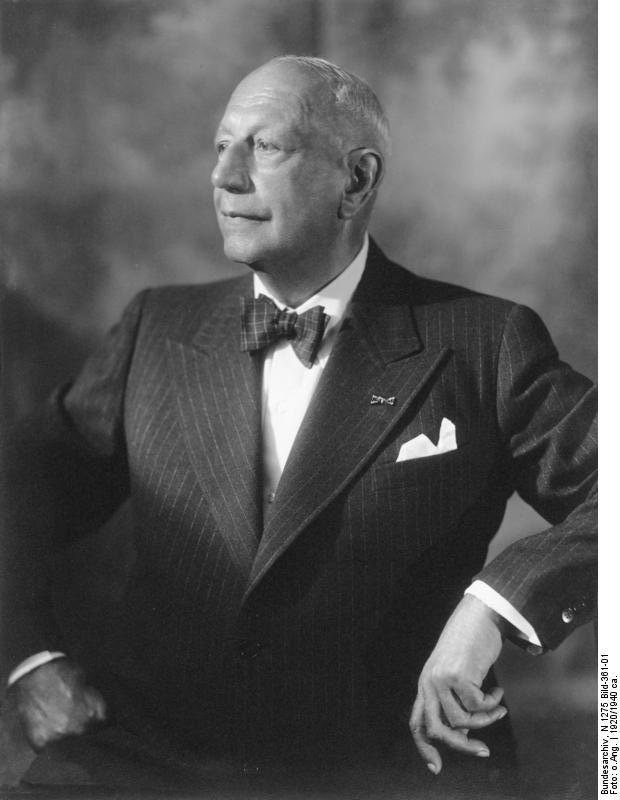
- Oskar Messter, 1920
- Born: 21 November 1866; Berlin, Prussia
- Died: 6 December 1943 (aged 77); Tegernsee, Nazi Germany

Akt-Skulpturen (1903)

Oskar Messter (21 November 1866 – 6 December 1943) was a German inventor and film tycoon in the early years of cinema. His firm Messter-Film was one of the dominant German production films before it was swallowed up by UFA in 1917, being one of the three original firms which constituted the cartel, along with Paul Davidson's PAGU and the German branch of Nordisk Film.

== Biography ==
Oskar Messter was born on November 21, 1866, in Berlin, where his father had founded in 1859 a company called Optisches und Mechanisches Institut Ed. Messter. This company manufactured and sold eyeglasses, precision medical devices, optical devices for magicians and show businessmen, electric reflectors for theaters, and projectors for the magic lantern. Being integrated in this world since he was a child, Oskar acquired both business, optical and mechanical skills, which he later applied in cinematography.

In 1892, his father's workshops became part of Oskar and he began to carry out his own experiments. Following in the footsteps of Filoteo Alberini with the kinetograph, Robert William Paul with the theatrograph, Birt Acres with the magic lantern in 1896, among many others, Messter managed to develop his first projector to retransmit films of Thomas Alva Edison's kinetoscope.

Later, he was chosen to repair a theatrograph, but abandoned it to focus on a better development of the kinetoscope, first adding a "Geneva drive" on the projectors to oscillatingly cause intermittent movement to advance the frames of the film. That being the case, on June 15, 1896, Oskar sold his first device. But Messter was not the only producer of film projectors in Germany. Robert W. Paul in London built projectors independently using this same mechanism for the advancement of the film almost at the same time, or Georg Bartling, belonging to the company of GmbH, exhibited a projector at the Industrial Exhibition of Berlin in 1896.

In the middle of 1896, Messter began to produce in series cameras and film projectors that were very successful. By the end of 1896, Messters-Projection Berlin had produced 64 projectors: 42 of these were sold in Germany and 22, in the rest of Europe. In just four years, the company's profits multiplied tenfold. Also in 1896, Messter rented a small theater that had gone bankrupt and inaugurated the second cinema hall in Berlin, since the first one was opened by the envoys of the Lumière brothers that precise year. Subsequently, Messter debuted at the Apollo, a Berlin variety theater, and organized a film projection service. Also at the end of 1896, Messter entered the business of film production, creating his first films, such as A Skater at the West Railway Station (1896) and At the Brandenburg Gate, Berlin (1896).

In 1916, Oskar Messter founded with the director of cinema Sascha Kolowrat-Krakowsky, the Wiener Sascha-Messter Film GmbH, Viennese daughter of the Messter-Film GmbH. However, at the end of the First World War, Messter sold his companies in Berlin and Vienna to the newly founded Universum-Film Aktiengesellschaft (UFA).

He donated his collection of historical film equipment to the German Museum in 1932. Messter died in 1943 in Tegernsee.

== Contributions ==
Oskar Messter was characterized for having an innovative mentality that he knew how to apply to the exploration of the new medium of cinematography, whether for scientific purposes or for commercial purposes. Among his most indicated contributions are:

- The slow motion photograph of the blossoming of flowers in early 1897.
- Various experiments in microscopic cinematography made between 1900 and 1910.
- Construction of the first film studio in Germany in 1900, which had artificial lighting with four lamps, where you could work independently of sunlight and time. In 1901, he moved the studio to another very similar location due to the space available. Later, in 1905 Messter adapted a glass atelier or workshop as a cinema studio with double height and adjacent rooms to store the sets and costumes of each performance. In this new study, he did depend on natural lighting, although he gradually began to use arc reflectors that allowed him to work with a mixed light. However, after some years this study proved insufficient and he rented two more floors to build a hanging structure, which had an electric motor to move the reflectors or the cameras around the stage.
- The first projections voiced in Germany in 1903.
- The equipment of its electromechanical synchronization system with the Tonbilder biophon in more than 500 cinemas between 1905 and 1913. It was an electromechanical synchronization mechanism that consisted of an electrical system that operated at the same speed the motors of a movie projector and a gramophone.
- The presentation of films spoken in English at the World Fair in Saint Louis, Missouri, United States in 1904.
- The realization a total of three hundred and twenty six silent films between 1896 and 1918. Until 1910, all of them were short films of very short duration and from 1911, they were already medium-length films and feature films.
- The construction of "stardom" through the promotion of the actress Henny Porten from 1910 to 1918.
- The market introduction of the standard Thaumatograph Modell XVII projector from 1914.
- The foundation of the film newscast Die Messters-Wochenschau (1914)
- The manufacture of high-speed military reconnaissance cameras in 1915.
- The organization of the German Technical-Cinematographic Society.
- The reorganization of its cinematographic activities in a consortium made up of three companies differentiated in 1901: the Messters-Projection GmbH, for the production and distribution of films; the Vereinigte Mechanische Werkstätten GmbH, for the manufacture of optical-mechanical equipment; and the Kosmograph Compagnie GmbH, for the exhibition of films in variety theaters.

== Early sound films ==
From 1896, Messter was interested in the search of a method of reproduction and synchronization of the sound effects of the cinematographic performance at the time of the "silent movies". So Messter invented the Tonbilder Biophon to show films, in which a gramophone played "Unter den Linden" accompanying the projection of animated images, but it was not a simple "accompaniment" but to precisely match the series of musical pieces with moving images. In effect, to add sound to the silent cinema it was necessary to solve problems of synchronization, since the image and the sound were recorded and reproduced by separated devices, which were difficult to initiate and to maintain rigged. On August 31, 1903, Messter held the first sound projection that took place in Germany at the "Apollo" Theater in Berlin. The inventor of the Biophon can be congratulated of belonging to the modern world.

Until 1907 the Tonbilder branch of the German film industry was dominated by Oskar Messter, who had reached the following agreement with Léon Gaumont that Gaumont would not supply Phonoscènes to Germany and Messter would not provide Tonbilder biophons to France, and that their respective devices would be sold by a joint consortium called Gaumont-Messter-Chronophone-Biophon. Messter's Tonbilders sold well while he kept his technical superiority over other film producers in Germany.

== Selected filmography ==
Between 1903 and 1910, Messter produced the first successful and popular series of silent films, including:

- No Sin on the Alpine Pastures (1915)
- He This Way, She That Way (1915)
- The Canned Bride (1915)
- The Robber Bride (1916)
- Lehmann's Honeymoon (1916)
- Frau Eva (1916)
- Werner Krafft (1916)
- The Wandering Light (1916)
- The Queen's Love Letter (1916)
- The Queen's Secretary (1916)
- The Giant's Fist (1917)
- Mountain Air (1917)
- Fear (1917)
- The Man in the Mirror (1917)
- Life Is a Dream (1917)
- The Marriage of Luise Rohrbach (1917)
- Frank Hansen's Fortune (1917)
- Imprisoned Soul (1917)
- The Princess of Neutralia (1917)
- Precious Stones (1918)
- Countess Kitchenmaid (1918)
- The Salamander Ruby (1918)
- The Victors (1918)
- Martyr of His Heart (1918)
- The Adventure of a Ball Night (1918)
- The Lady, the Devil and the Model (1918)
- Agnes Arnau and Her Three Suitors (1918)
- The Ringwall Family (1918)
- Put to the Test (1918)
- The Homecoming of Odysseus (1918)
- Her Sport (1919)
- The Spinning Ball (1919)
- Victim of Society (1919)
- Leap Into Life (1924)

== Literature ==
- Loiperdinger, M. (Ed.): Oskar Messter: Filmpionier der Kaiserzeit and Oskar Messter, Erfinder und Geschäftsmann, KINtop Schriften 2 & 3, Stroemfeld/Roter Stern; Basel, 1994. In German.
- Messter, O.: Mein Weg mit dem Film, Berlin, 1936. Also in German.
