= Messter Film =

German silent film company

Messter Film was a German film production company which operated during the silent era. It was founded by the German film pioneer Oskar Messter who already owned a chain of cinemas. It was based in Berlin which had emerged as the centre of the German film industry. Messter quickly established itself as dominant force in German production, particularly during the boom years of the First World War when foreign films faced many restrictions in Germany. Messter played a prominent role in the development of the German feature film, moving away from the shorter running times which had been standard in the early years of cinema. Messter also produced its own newsreels.

In 1909 Messter Film took part in the Paris Film Congress, a failed attempt by Europe's leading producers to create a film cartel similar to that formed by the MPPC in the United States.

In 1917 the company became part of the large conglomerate Universum Film AG (UFA) which brought together many of the leading German companies in a single, powerful organisation. For several years after this Messter continued to produce films as an individual unit of the UFA umbrella. UFA took over Messter's associated distribution partner Hansa Film.

== Bibliography ==
- Bergfelder, Tim & Bock, Hans-Michael. The Concise Cinegraph: Encyclopedia of German. Berghahn Books, 2009.
- Hardt, Ursula. From Caligari to California: Erich Pommer's Life in the International Film Wars. Berghahn Books, 1996.
- Thorsen, Isak. Nordisk Films Kompagni 1906-1924, Volume 5: The Rise and Fall of the Polar Bear. Indiana University Press, 2017.
- Prawer, S.S. Between Two Worlds: The Jewish Presence in German and Austrian Film, 1910-1933. Berghahn Books, 2005.
