= List of LGBTQ-related films pre-1920 =

This is a list of lesbian, gay, bisexual, transgender or queer-related films released before 1920. It contains theatrically released films that deal with important gay, lesbian, bisexual, transgender or queer characters or issues and may have same-sex romance or relationships as a plot device.

== 1895–1919 ==
Title	Year	Director	Country	Genre	Cast	Notes
The Dickson Experimental Sound Film	1895	William Dixon	United States			Although described as having a homosexual subtext by film historian Vito Russo this interpretation has been disputed.
The Eclipse, or the Courtship of the Sun and Moon	1907	Georges Méliès	France	Short, fantasy		a.k.a. L'éclipse du soleil en pleine lune
Algie the Miner	1912	Alice Guy-Blaché	United States	Comedy, western	Billy Quirk, Mary Foy	
A Florida Enchantment	1914	Sidney Drew	United States	Comedy	Edith Storey, Sidney Drew, Ethyl Lloyd, Grace Stevens, Charles Kent, Jane Morrow, Ada Gifford, Lillian Burns, Allan Campbell, Cortland van Deusen, Frank O'Neil	Based on the novel and play (the latter of which is now lost) of the same name by Fergus Redmond and Archibald Clavering Gunter
Zapata's Gang	1914	Urban Gad	Germany	Comedy	Asta Nielsen, Fred Immler, Senta Eichstaedt, Adele Reuter-Eichberg and Mary Scheller	a.k.a. Zapatas Bande
Filibus	1915	Mario Roncoroni	Italy	Adventure, science fiction	Valeria Creti, Giovanni Spano, Cristina Ruspoli	
The Wings	1916	Mauritz Stiller	Sweden	Drama	Egil Eide, Lars Hanson, Lili Bech, Julius Hälsig	a.k.a. Vingarne; based on the novel Mikaël by Herman Bang
Behind the Screen	1916	Charlie Chaplin	United States	Comedy, romance	Charlie Chaplin, Edna Purviance, Eric Campbell	After Chaplin's prophand character kisses Edna Purviance's character in drag, villain Eric Campbell sees this and begins doing an effeminite dance to mock Chaplin's character.
I Don't Want to Be a Man	1918	Ernst Lubitsch	Germany	Comedy, romance	Ossi Oswalda, Curt Goetz, Ferry Sikla, Margarete Kupfer, Victor Janson	a.k.a. Ich möchte kein Mann sein
Different from the Others	1919	Richard Oswald	Germany	Drama	Conrad Veidt, Fritz Schulz, Reinhold Schünzel, Anita Berber, Magnus Hirschfeld, Karl Giese	a.k.a. Anders als die Andern
Aus eines Mannes Mädchenjahren (A Man's Girlhood)	1919	Paul Legband, Julius Rode	Germany	Biopic	Erika Glässner, Hans Albers, Olga Engl and Lotte Stein	Lost film. Based on the autobiography of the same name by Karl M. Baer (under the pseudonym N.O. Body) about his experiences as an intersex person
