= The Moth (1911 film) =

1911 film directed by Urban Gad

- Directed by: Urban Gad
- Written by: Urban Gad
- Starring: Asta Nielsen; Henny von Hanstein; Emil Albes; Max Obal; Heinrich Peer
- Cinematography: Guido Seeber
- Production company: Deutsche Bioscop
- Release date: 1911
- Country: Germany
- Languages: Silent; German intertitles

The Moth (German: Nachtfalter) is a 1911 German silent drama film directed and written by Urban Gad. It was the second film that Asta Nielsen made in Germany. The film is considered lost.

== Plot ==
Sisters Olga and Martha work together as seamstresses, but Olga is persuaded by comedian Goldmann to run off with him and become a dancer, Olga takes all of her and her sister's savings and flees with Goldmann. Years pass and Olga becomes a celebrated dancer known as Mademoiselle Yvonne. Martha remains a seamstress and marries Felix Dorner, also a tailor. They both live a simple life but after Dorner's business collapses he turns to alcohol, but Martha continues to support him.

As Mademoiselle Yvonne, Olga lives a carefree life. The wealthy Baron von Malten courts Olga and she is prepared to give up her career as a dancer but first, she must give one last performance in her hometown. Just as she is performing, Felix Dorner inherits a large amount of money. He leaves Martha, who breaks her arm trying to stop him, and can no longer work as a seamstress, but earns money as a flower seller. One day Martha sees her husband in a cafe, he has become Olga's new favourite benefactor due to his wealth and generosity. Martha is enraged and confronts her sister for not only stealing her money but now her husband, Olga is shocked and begs her sister for forgiveness. Olga is emotionally shattered and rushes off and kills herself. Beside Olga's open casket, Martha and Felix reconcile, just as Olga had wished in her will.

== Cast ==
- Asta Nielsen as Olga, also known as Mademoiselle Yvonne
- Henny von Hanstein as Martha, Olga's sister
- Emil Albes as Felix Dorner
- Max Obal as Goldmann, a vaudeville comedian
- Heinrich Peer as Baron von Malten

== Production ==
In 1910, Asta Nielsen made The Abyss directed by Urban Gad, the film was a success but there were no film offers in Denmark for either Nielsen or Gad. Gad contacted Deutsche Bioscop, which offered Nielsen a contract for two films. Although Gad's collaboration was not included in the contract, he accompanied Nielsen to Berlin. He eventually took over directing Gipsy Blood and The Moth without payment. He only later received payment for the scripts he wrote for both films. It was shot at the Deutsche Bioscop studios at 123 Chausseestraße in Berlin.

The Moth was 800 metres long, it was reviewed by censors and banned for young people on April 6, 1911. The film premiered on May 13, 1911, in Germany and May 29, 1911, in Denmark. There is no known surviving copy of the film.
