= Honour (Sudermann play) =

Honour (German: Die Ehre) is an 1889 play by the German writer Hermann Sudermann. It tells the story of the conflicts and love affairs between two families, one wealthy and one poor. When the wealthy father has an affair with a daughter in the poor family, her brother challenges the rich man to a duel, only to be laughed off.

== Reception ==
The play was Sudermann's debut as a dramatist. It became an immediate success, launching Sudermann into literary stardom in Germany, and was widely performed during the Wilhelmine period. Later, after naturalist literature and the influence of Henrik Ibsen had become more commonplace, the play lost much of its initial status.

The American literary critic James Huneker wrote in his 1905 book Iconoclasts:

Yet it is easy to admire Honour. It contains, notably in the two acts of the "hinter haus," real strokes of observation and profound knowledge of human nature. ... The motive of Honour is not alone the ironic contrast of real and conventional ideals of honour—it shoots a bolt toward Nietzsche's land where good and evil blend in one hazy due. Sudermann, here and in nearly all his later pieces, challenges the moral law—Ibsen's loftiest heron feather—and if any appreciable theory of conduct is to be deduced from his works, it is that the moral law must submit to the variations of time and place, even though its infraction spells sin, even though the individual in his thirst for self-seeking smashes the slate of morality and perishes in the attempt.

== Adaptations ==
The play was adapted for film twice in Germany. Urban Gad's Frontstairs and Backstairs, starring Asta Nielsen, premiered in 1914. An adaptation directed by Richard Oswald was released in 1925.
