= The Firm Gets Married =

The Firm Gets Married may refer to:

- The Firm Gets Married, a 1914 German silent comedy film
- The Firm Gets Married, a 1931 German musical comedy film
