= The White Roses =

1916 film directed by Urban Gad

- Directed by: Urban Gad
- Written by: Urban Gad
- Starring: Asta Nielsen
- Cinematography: Guido Seeber
- Production company: PAGU
- Release date: 23 October 1916
- Country: Germany
- Languages: Silent; German intertitles

A Danish print of The White Roses

The White Roses (German: Die weißen Rosen) is a 1916 German silent film directed by Urban Gad and starring Asta Nielsen, Ernst Hofmann, Max Landa and Fred Immler.

== Plot ==
In order to look refined for her entrance in a prestigious theatre in Ostend, actress Thilda Wardier borrows an expensive piece of family jewellery from her wealthy fiancé Adam Rochord. However, a criminal gang staying in the same hotel as them hear about the jewellery, manage to steal it and replace the jewels with fake ones. When the Rochord family learn about this, they conclude that Thilda is a thief and want Adam to cancel their marriage. Thilda has to solve the crime by herself to prove her innocence and regain her place near her loved one.

The title "the whites roses" refers to the large bouquet of white roses Adam Rochord present himself with everytime he goes to see Thilda, and that is used by the gang in their tricks.

== Cast ==
- Asta Nielsen as Thilda Wardier
- Ernst Hofmann as Graf Adam
- Max Landa as Lord Kenley / Henry von Muiden
- Mary Scheller as Gräfin de Rochard
- Fred Immler as Mr. Morton
- Herr Stengel as Graf Henry
- Carl Auen as Oberkellner
- Alfred Abel
- Franz Arndt
- Senta Eichstaedt
- Ernst Fiedler-Spies
- Karl Harbacher
- Hanns Kräly
- Eddie Seefeld
- Magnus Stifter

== Bibliography ==
- Kapczynski, Jennifer M.; Richardson, Michael D., eds. (2012). A New History of German Cinema. Camden House. ISBN 978-1-57113-595-7.
