= The Film Primadonna =

- Directed by: Urban Gad
- Written by: Urban Gad
- Starring: Asta Nielsen
- Cinematography: Karl Freund; Axel Graatkjær; Guido Seeber
- Production company: PAGU
- Release date: 6 December 1913
- Country: Germany
- Languages: Silent; German intertitles

The Film Primadonna (German: Die Filmprimadonna) is a 1913 German silent film directed by Urban Gad and starring Asta Nielsen and Paul Otto.

== Cast ==
- Asta Nielsen as Ruth Breton
- Paul Otto as von Zornhorst
- Fritz Weidemann as Walter Heim, screenwriter and actor
- Fred Immler

== Bibliography ==
- Jennifer M. Kapczynski & Michael D. Richardson. A New History of German Cinema.
