= Jugend und Tollheit =

1913 German silent film directed by Urban Gad

- Jugend und Tollheit
- Directed by: Urban Gad
- Screenplay by: Urban Gad
- Starring: Asta Nielsen; Hans Mierendorff; Fritz Weidemann
- Cinematography: Guido Seeber
- Color process: black and white
- Production companies: Deutsche Bioscop; Projektions-AG Union
- Release date: 1913
- Running time: 900 meters (3 film reels) — German version; 600 metres (2 reels) — US version
- Country: Germany
- Language: German

Jugend und Tollheit (Youth and Madness) is a German silent film in three acts by Urban Gad from 1913, starring Gad's wife Asta Nielsen and Hans Mierendoff. It is one of the director's lost films.

== Plot ==
Leutnant Ernst von Prangen picks up his guardian, the manorial administrator Peter von Prangen, at the railway station. He puts a good face on the matter: Not only has he accumulated debts that he wants Peter to pay, he also wants Peter to allow him to marry the beautiful but poor teacher's daughter Jesta Müller. Peter agrees to pay Ernst's debts; however, he refuses to allow Ernst and Jesta to marry. What Ernst and Jesta do not know is that Peter himself is in financial difficulties and his estate is already heavily in debt. Back at his estate, Peter is visited by his neighbour Graabe, who wants his bill of exchange of 130,000 marks settled. He knows that Peter cannot pay the money and proposes a deal: The bill will be settled if Ernst becomes engaged to Graabe's daughter Sophie.

Peter tells Ernst about the deal he would like to make, which would help Peter and Ernst in the end. Ernst is also in a quandary, as he owes a lot to his guardian. It is Jesta who is prepared to fight. With the help of her brother and her father's wig, she transforms herself into a young man and thus accompanies her lover on the journey. Ernst, in turn, is not allowed to reveal Jesta's prank and introduces her to her father's estate as his friend "Burdock", a student. All sorts of complications ensue, mainly due to Jesta's need to keep her identity a secret and her difficulties in properly appearing as a man. She fails at skat, has to drink grog and smoke cigars and is supposed to share a bedroom with Ernst, whereupon she takes refuge in Peter's study with a pillow and spends the night there. Further embarrassments follow the next day as well: Jesta is forced to ride a horse and barely escapes a wig cut at the barber's, but has to be shaved. At the estate, Jesta again tries to spend every minute with Ernst, while Peter and Graabe try to let Ernst and Sophie spend undisturbed time together. Peter and Graabe try to persuade her to go swimming with the men, but Jesta is able to escape in time and also prevent an intimate scene between Ernst and Sophie at the last second. Old Graabe is so incensed by this that he gives Sophie the bill for 130,000 marks to use. Of necessity, Peter and Ernst agree to Ernst's engagement to Sophie, which is to be announced at a garden party the very next Sunday.

Jesta continues to try to disrupt Sophie and Ernst's meetings, but soon changes her tactics. She wants to seduce Sophie herself. Jesta encourages Sophie to drink alcohol and they both go for a walk in the moonlight. There is a kiss on the hand and finally an intimate kiss on the mouth and close embraces - observed by Ernst. When she also pretends that Sophie would never love her because she has Ernst in her hand through the bill of exchange, Sophie gives her the bill of exchange in her room as a pledge of her love. Jesta manipulates the room lamp so that all the gentlemen sitting in the garden can see their supposed love scene in the room as a silhouette. The company believe they see Sophie and Ernst, but Ernst enters their table just as Graabe has announced Ernst and Sophie's engagement. Outraged, everyone rushes to Sophie's room and tears her and Jesta apart. Jesta's wig is lost in the process. Sophie proves to be a fair loser. She realises that Jesta loves Ernst and also enforces that the large bill of exchange does not have to be cashed immediately. Together they all return to the party and Sophie announces to everyone's astonishment that Jesta and Ernst have become engaged.

== Cast ==
- Asta Nielsen as Jetta Müller
- Hans Mierendorff as Peter von Prangen, a landowner
- Fritz Weidemann as Lieutenant Ernst von Prangen

== Production ==
Youth and Madness was shot in the summer of 1912 within a week at Bioscop's Neubabelsberg studio. After The Dance of Death, The General's Children, When the Mask Falls and Girls Without a Fatherland, it was the fifth part of the 1912-13 Nielsen & Gad series. The censors reviewed the film in September 1912. The earliest recorded screening is from 3 January 1913.

There is no known surviving print of what is believed to be 900 metres of film.

== Reception ==
Contemporary critics praised Nielsen's play: "Asta Nielsen's gentleman's suit suits her exquisitely, she looks brilliant and plays the funny intrigue with much humour and grace", according to the Danish Politiken. Urban Gad's excursion into the comic field was also praised:

He [...] has this time let his spotlight play on life's brighter side and picked out a slice of sunny milieu with the hand of the master. He has given the characters of his comedy a good dose of splendid humour and has endowed his heroine, embodied by Asta Nielsen, with this quality to such a rich extent that the effect on the audience could not fail to be felt.
The thrilling plot, the rich abundance of situational comedy, the warm, pulsating life that flows through the delightful three-act play will make 'Youth and Madness' a film creation that will fully satisfy every theatregoer and leave him with the consciousness of having enjoyed himself heartily.

— 1912 film programme

In 1928, Asta Nielsen herself retrospectively described Youth and Folly as "a naïve, but jocular comedy, wherein I, as a young girl in men's clothes, go out on adventures with an enterprising uncle."

"Asta Nielsen's trouser-roll films are among the wittiest and most imaginative comedy produced at the time," critics said in retrospect.

== Bibliography ==
- Youth and Folly. In: Ilona Brennicke, Joe Hembus: Classics of the German Silent Film 1910-1930. Goldmann, Munich 1983, ISBN 3-442-10212-X, p. 197.
- Youth and Madness. In: Karola Gramann, Heide Schlüpmann (eds.): Moth. Asta Nielsen, her films. Volume 2 of the Edition Asta Nielsen. 2nd edition. Verlag Filmarchiv Austria, Vienna 2010, ISBN 978-3-902531-83-4, pp. 101-106.
- Youth and Madness. In: Renate Seydel, Allan Hagedorff (eds.): Asta Nielsen. Her life in photographic documents, self-testimonies and contemporary reflections. Henschelverlag, Berlin 1981, pp. 84-85.
