= Zapata's Gang =

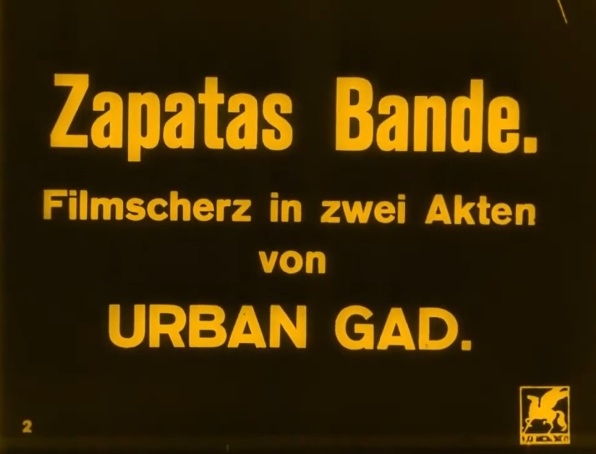
- Title card
- German: Zapatas Bande
- Directed by: Urban Gad
- Written by: Urban Gad
- Produced by: Paul Davidson
- Starring: Asta Nielsen
- Cinematography: Karl Freund; Axel Graatkjær; Guido Seeber
- Production company: PAGU
- Release date: 27 February 1914
- Running time: 42 minutes
- Country: Germany
- Languages: Silent; German intertitles

Zapata's Gang (German: Zapatas Bande) is a 1914 German comedic silent film directed by Urban Gad and starring Asta Nielsen and Fred Immler. It depicts the difficulties a crime film's actors face after being mistaken for actual robbers. The film is considered to be one of the first German films with bisexual characters.

== Cast ==
- Asta Nielsen as Elena
- Fred Immler
- Senta Eichstaedt
- Adele Reuter-Eichberg
- Mary Scheller
- Hans Lanser-Rudolf
- Carl Dibbern
- Max Agerty
- Ernst Körner
- Eric Harden
- Max Landa

== Reception ==
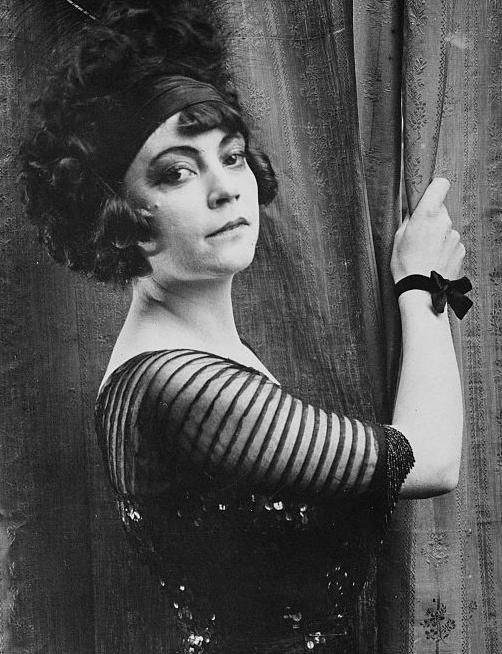
Asta Nielsen

Author Heidi Schlüpmann wrote "this is cinema encouraging transgressions of every kind and in every direction; but the film's diegetic actors also transform a robber play planned in Berlin into an episode in the life of Italian dwellers and film tourists; Nielsen's skills as an actress become visible here in her capacity to forge connections to the everyday reality through which she passes."

Author Sabine Hake opined that "the film almost reverses the hierarchies between fiction and reality and offers a surprisingly modern perspective on the old problem of life imitating art." Hake also notes that the actors "theatrical gestures appear completely out of place in the serene Italian countryside and indirectly confirm the higher reality associated with the film world."

== See also ==
- Asta Nielsen filmography
- Cinema of Germany
- List of German films of 1895–1918
- List of LGBTQ-related films pre-1920
