= Black Count =

(The) Black Count may refer to:

- The Black Count: Glory, Revolution, Betrayal, and the Real Count of Monte Cristo, a 2012 biographical book by Tom Reiss
- The Black Count Vanon, a fictional character of Guin Saga
- Black Count, a fictional character of My My Mai
- The Black Count (film), a 1920 German silent film
