= Frontstairs and Backstairs =

1915 film directed by Urban Gad

- Directed by: Urban Gad
- Screenplay by: Urban Gad
- Based on: Honour by Hermann Sudermann
- Starring: Asta Nielsen
- Cinematography: Karl Freund; Axel Graatkjær; Guido Seeber
- Production company: PAGU
- Release date: 1915
- Country: Germany
- Languages: Silent; German intertitles

Frontstairs and Backstairs (German: Vordertreppe und Hintertreppe) is a 1915 German silent film directed by Urban Gad and starring Asta Nielsen and Paul Otto. It is based on the 1889 play Honour by Hermann Sudermann.

== Cast ==
- Asta Nielsen as Sabine Schulze
- Paul Otto as Leutnant von Hameln
- Fred Immler as Kellner Lehmann
- Victor Arnold as Kommerzienrat Goldsohn
- Mary Scheller as Frau Goldsohn
- Senta Eichstaedt as Tochter Goldsohn
- Alfred Kuehne as Schneider Schulze
- Adele Reuter-Eichberg as Mutter Schulze

== Bibliography ==
- Jennifer M. Kapczynski & Michael D. Richardson. A New History of German Cinema.
