= Little Angel (film) =

- Directed by: Urban Gad
- Written by: Urban Gad
- Produced by: Paul Davidson
- Starring: Asta Nielsen
- Cinematography: Karl Freund; Axel Graatkjær; Guido Seeber
- Production company: PAGU
- Release date: 3 January 1914
- Country: Germany
- Languages: Silent; German intertitles

Little Angel (German: Engelein) is a 1914 German silent comedy film directed by Urban Gad and starring Asta Nielsen, Max Landa and Fred Immler.

== Cast ==
- Asta Nielsen as Jesta
- Alfred Kühne as Redakteur Schneider
- Max Landa as Peter J. Schneider
- Fred Immler as Theodor Schiebstaedt
- Bruno Kastner
- Hanns Kräly as Hauslehrer
- Adele Reuter-Eichberg as Meta Schiebstaedt
- Martin Wolff
- Erner Hübsch

== Bibliography ==
- Jennifer M. Kapczynski & Michael D. Richardson. A New History of German Cinema.
