= The Marriage of Figaro (disambiguation) =

The Marriage of Figaro is a 1786 opera by Wolfgang Amadeus Mozart.

The Marriage of Figaro may also refer to:

- The Marriage of Figaro (play), a 1778 comedy by Pierre Beaumarchais
- The Marriage of Figaro (1920 film), a German silent historical film
- The Marriage of Figaro (1949 film), an East German musical film
- The Marriage of Figaro (1960 film), an Australian TV film
- "Marriage of Figaro" (Mad Men), an episode of Mad Men
- The Marriage of Figaro, a 1799 opera by Marcos Portugal
- The Marriage of Figaro discography, discography for the opera by Mozart
