= Paul Morgan (actor) =

Austrian actor (1886-1938)

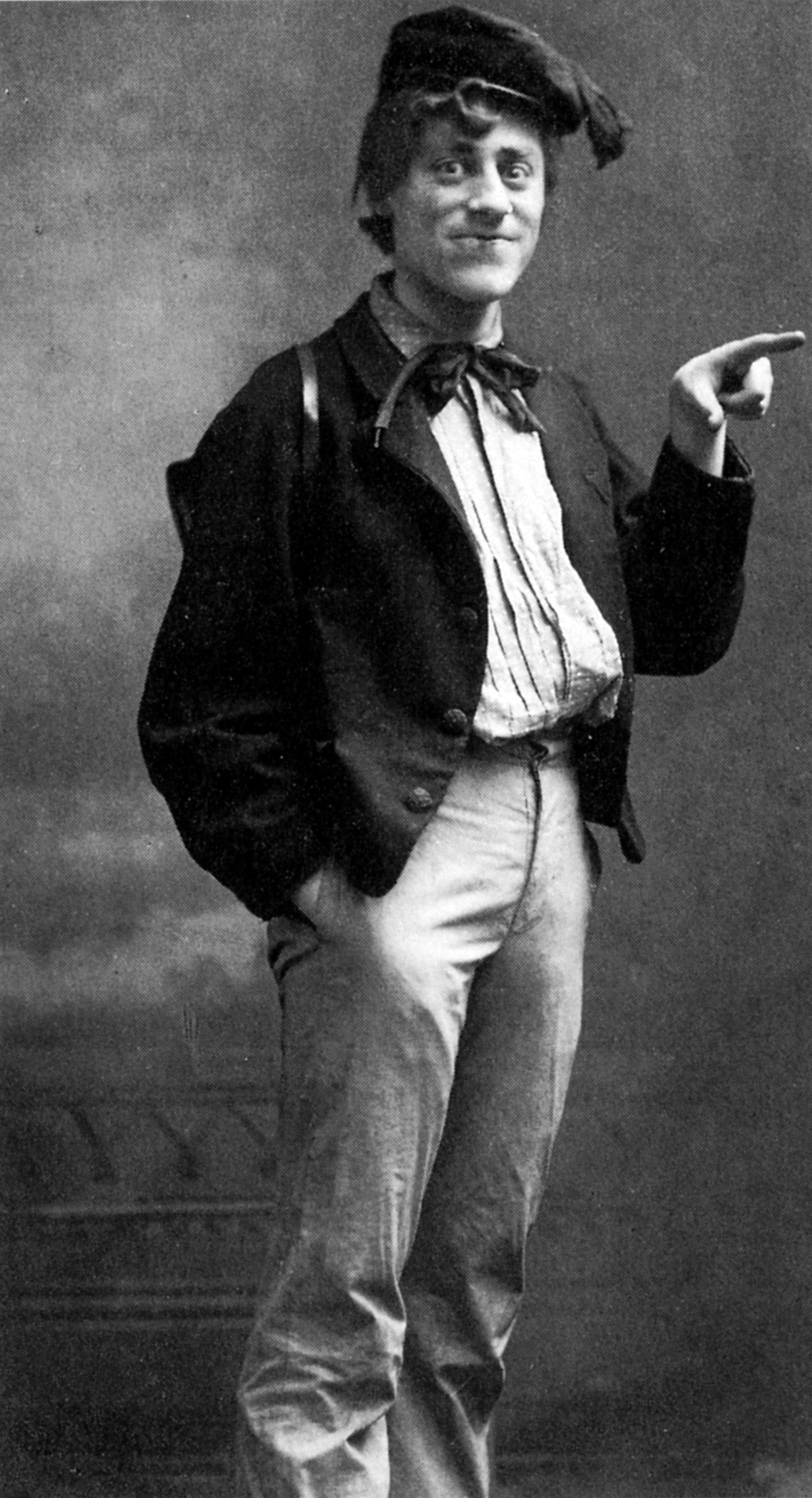
- Morgan performing in Vienna (1909)
- Born: Georg Paul Morgenstern; 1 October 1886; Vienna; Austria-Hungary
- Died: 10 December 1938 (aged 52); Buchenwald; Germany
- Occupation: Film actor
- Years active: 1910 - 1936

Paul Morgan (born Georg Paul Morgenstern; October 1, 1886 – December 10, 1938) was a Jewish Austrian actor and Kabarett performer. He died in Buchenwald concentration camp in 1938.

== Selected filmography ==
- The Gentleman Without a Residence (1915)
- The Mistress of the World, Part VI (1919)
- Countess Doddy (1919)
- Prostitution (1919)
- Around the World in Eighty Days (1919)
- Diamonds (1920)
- Respectable Women (1920)
- Kurfürstendamm (1920)
- Four Around a Woman (1921)
- Peter Voss, Thief of Millions (1921)
- Hedda Gabler (1925)
- The Girl with a Patron (1925)
- The Elegant Bunch (1925)
- Cock of the Roost (1925)
- Love and Trumpets (1925)
- The Flower Girl of Potsdam Square (1925)
- The Red Mouse (1926)
- Vienna - Berlin (1926)
- When She Starts, Look Out (1926)
- The Third Squadron (1926)
- Circus Romanelli (1926)
- The Bank Crash of Unter den Linden (1926)
- The Pride of the Company (1926)
- The World Wants To Be Deceived (1926)
- We'll Meet Again in the Heimat (1926)
- Darling, Count the Cash (1926)
- The Brothers Schellenberg (1926)
- The Queen of the Baths (1926)
- The Three Mannequins (1926)
- The Divorcée (1926)
- Trude (1926)
- The Schimeck Family (1926)
- We Belong to the Imperial-Royal Infantry Regiment (1926)
- Family Gathering in the House of Prellstein (1927)
- Radio Magic (1927)
- A Serious Case (1927)
- Break-in (1927)
- Heaven on Earth (1927)
- Schwester Veronica (1927)
- Dyckerpotts' Heirs (1928)
- Mikosch Comes In (1928)
- Mascots (1929)
- Sinful and Sweet (1929)
- Fräulein Else (1929)
- Miss Midshipman (1929)
- Fairground People (1930)
- Two Hearts in Waltz Time (1930)
- Rendezvous (1930)
- Vienna, City of Song (1930)
- Twice Married (1930)
- The Cabinet of Doctor Larifari (1930)
- Queen of the Night (1931)
- Casanova wider Willen (1931)
- Men Behind Bars (1931)
- Marriage with Limited Liability (1931)
- Poor as a Church Mouse (1931)
- Schubert's Dream of Spring (1931)
- Liebeskommando (1931)
- The Ladies Diplomat (1932)
- Holzapfel Knows Everything (1932)
- The Empress and I (1933)
- Catherine the Last (1936)

== Bibliography ==
- Hardt, Ursula. From Caligari to California: Erich Pommer's Life in the International Film Wars. Berghahn Books, 1996.
- Jelavich, Peter. Berlin Cabaret. Harvard University Press, 1996.
