= The Flower Woman of Potsdam Square =

1925 film

- Directed by: Jaap Speyer
- Written by: A. Lerski; Max Reichmann; Alfred Schirokauer; Reinhold Schünzel
- Starring: Erika Glässner; Ralph Arthur Roberts; Reinhold Schünzel
- Cinematography: Otto Kanturek
- Production company: Domo-Film
- Distributed by: Süd-Film
- Release date: 10 March 1925
- Country: Germany
- Languages: Silent; German intertitles

The Flower Woman of Potsdam Square (German: Die Blumenfrau vom Potsdamer Platz) is a 1925 German silent comedy film directed by Jaap Speyer and starring Erika Glässner, Ralph Arthur Roberts, and Reinhold Schünzel.

The film's sets were designed by the art director Franz Schroedter.

== Cast ==
- Erika Glässner as Trude, Mahnkes Frau, die Blumenfrau
- Ralph Arthur Roberts as Dr. Egon Schmitz
- Reinhold Schünzel as Stiefelputzer
- William Dieterle as August Mahnke
- Rosa Valetti as Rieke Schulze
- Frida Richard as Frau Trudes Mutter
- Blandine Ebinger as Erna Buschke
- Paul Morgan as Lawyer Dr. Meyer VII
- Karl Platen as Vorsitzender
- Maria Kamradek as Verkäuferin

== Bibliography ==
- Grange, William (2008). Cultural Chronicle of the Weimar Republic. Lanham, MD: Scarecrow Press. ISBN 978-0-8108-5967-8.
