= The Queen of the Stock Exchange =

- Directed by: Edmund Edel
- Written by: Edmund Edel
- Starring: Asta Nielsen
- Production company: Neutral-Film
- Release date: 23 May 1918
- Country: Germany
- Languages: Silent; German intertitles

The Queen of the Stock Exchange (German:Die Börsenkönigin) is a 1918 German silent film directed by Edmund Edel and starring Asta Nielsen and Aruth Wartan.

== Cast ==
- Asta Nielsen as Helene Netzler
- Aruth Wartan as Lindholm, Bergwerksdirektor
- Willy Kaiser-Heyl as Chief Inspector Muller

== Bibliography ==
- Jennifer M. Kapczynski & Michael D. Richardson. A New History of German Cinema.
