= The Woman in the Trunk =

1921 film

- Directed by: Emil Albes
- Written by: Paul Rosenhayn
- Starring: Georg H. Schnell; Margit Barnay; Paul Bildt
- Cinematography: Eugen Hamm
- Production company: Kassandra-Film
- Release date: 25 February 1921
- Country: Germany
- Languages: Silent; German intertitles

The Woman in the Trunk (German: Die Dame im Koffer) is a 1921 German silent mystery film directed by Emil Albes and starring Georg H. Schnell, Margit Barnay and Paul Bildt. It features a British detective Joe Jenkins, and was part of a trend of films inspired by Sherlock Holmes including the Joe Deebs and Stuart Webbs series.

== Cast ==
- Georg H. Schnell as Joe Jenkins, Detektiv
- Margit Barnay
- Paul Bildt
- Gerda Frey
- Fred Goebel
- Gert Sascha

== Bibliography ==
- Giesen, Rolf. The Nosferatu Story: The Seminal Horror Film, Its Predecessors and Its Enduring Legacy. McFarland, 2019.
