= Hands Up, Eddy Polo =

1928 film

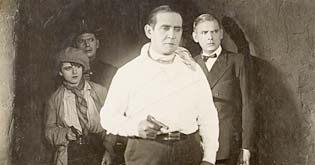
- Directed by: Léo Lasko
- Written by: Ekatarina Darskaja
- Starring: Eddie Polo; Ernst Reicher; Otz Tollen
- Cinematography: Ludwig Lippert
- Production company: Boston Film
- Release date: 27 September 1928
- Country: Germany
- Languages: Silent; German intertitles

Hands Up, Eddy Polo (German: Hände hoch, hier Eddy Polo) is a 1928 German silent action film directed by Léo Lasko and starring Eddie Polo, Ernst Reicher and Otz Tollen. The film's sets were designed by the art director Karl Görge.

== Cast ==
- Eddie Polo as Eddy Polo
- Steffi Lorée as Kleine Assistentin Steffi
- Ernst Reicher as Kommissar Grant
- Otz Tollen as Lord Winshope
- Ogima Barcelona as Gutsverwalter
- Corry Bell as Lady Winshope
- Hannelore Benzinger as Russenmarie
- Fritz Genschow as Russenphilipp
- Alexandra Schmitt as Mutter

== Bibliography ==
- Alfred Krautz. International directory of cinematographers, set- and costume designers in film, Volume 4. Saur, 1984.
