= The Traitress =

1911 film directed by Urban Gad

- Directed by: Urban Gad
- Written by: Erich Zeiske
- Starring: Asta Nielsen; Max Obal; Robert Valberg
- Cinematography: Guido Seeber
- Production companies: Deutsche Bioscop; PAGU
- Distributed by: Internationale Film-Vertriebs
- Release date: 9 December 1911
- Running time: 48 minutes
- Country: Germany
- Languages: Silent; German intertitles

The Traitress (German: Die Verräterin) is a 1911 German silent drama film directed by Urban Gad and starring Asta Nielsen, Max Obal, Robert Valberg and Emil Albes.

It was shot at the Deutsche Bioscop studios at 123 Chausseestraße in Berlin.

The Traitress (1911)

== Cast ==
- Asta Nielsen as Yvonne
- Max Obal as Marquis de Bougival
- Robert Valberg as Lieutenant von Mallwitz
- Emil Albes as Vujrat, leader of the partisans

== Bibliography ==
- Bock, Hans-Michael & Bergfelder, Tim. The Concise CineGraph. Encyclopedia of German Cinema. Berghahn Books, 2009.
