= Dudu, a Human Destiny =

1924 film

- German film poster
- German: Dudu, ein Menschenschicksal
- Directed by: Rudolf Meinert
- Written by: Rudolf Meinert
- Produced by: Rudolf Meinert
- Starring: Alfred Abel; Robert Garrison; Maly Delschaft
- Cinematography: Otto Kanturek
- Production company: Internationale Film AG
- Release date: 22 January 1924
- Country: Germany
- Languages: Silent; German intertitles

Dudu, a Human Destiny (German: Dudu, ein Menschenschicksal) is a 1924 German silent film directed by Rudolf Meinert and starring Alfred Abel, Robert Garrison, and Maly Delschaft. It is part of the tradition of circus films.

The film's sets were designed by the art director Franz Seemann.

== Cast ==
- Alfred Abel
- Robert Garrison
- Maly Delschaft
- Philipp Manning
- Lotte Sachs
- Max Schreck
- Margot Morgan
- Margarete Kupfer
- Olga Limburg
- Johanna Ewald
- Leopold von Ledebur
- Kurt Katch
- Wilhelm Diegelmann
- Emil Albes
- Paul Henckels
