= The Skull of Pharaoh's Daughter =

1920 film

- Directed by: Otz Tollen
- Written by: Curd Scheidig; Otz Tollen
- Starring: Emil Jannings; Erna Morena; Kurt Vespermann
- Cinematography: Eugen Hamm
- Production company: John Hagenbeck-Film
- Release date: 11 November 1920
- Running time: 60 minutes
- Country: Germany
- Languages: Silent; German intertitles

The Skull of Pharaoh's Daughter (German: Der Schädel der Pharaonentochter) is a 1920 German silent film directed by Otz Tollen and starring Emil Jannings, Erna Morena and Kurt Vespermann.

The film's sets were designed by the art director Fritz Kraenke.

== Cast ==
- Emil Jannings as Osorcon, Pharao of Egypt
- Erna Morena as Amnertis
- Kurt Vespermann as Tirhaka
- Bernhard Goetzke as Paophis
- Hermann Vallentin
- Hanna Ralph
- Erra Bognar
- Kurt Ehrle
- Wilhelm Diegelmann
- Agnes Straub
- Elsa Wanneck
- Toni Zimmerer
- Leopold von Ledebur
- Margit Barnay
- Margarete Rühmkopf
- Hans Mühlhofer
- Heinrich Schroth
- Anita Berber
- Heinz Salfner
- Rudolf Forster
- Ludwig Rex
- Josef Reithofer
- Fritz Kortner

== Bibliography ==
- Herman G. Weinberg. The Lubitsch touch: a critical study. Dover Publications, 1977.
