= Poor Jenny (film) =

1912 film directed by Urban Gad

- Directed by: Urban Gad
- Written by: Urban Gad
- Starring: Asta Nielsen
- Cinematography: Guido Seeber
- Production company: Deutsche Bioscop
- Distributed by: PAGU
- Release date: 2 March 1912
- Country: Germany
- Languages: Silent; German intertitles

Poor Jenny (German: Die arme Jenny) is a 1912 German silent film directed by Urban Gad and starring Gad's wife Asta Nielsen, Leo Peukert and Emil Albes.

The film's sets were designed by the art director Robert A. Dietrich.

== Cast ==
- Asta Nielsen as Jenny Schmidt
- Leo Peukert as Eduard Reinhold
- Emil Albes as Werkmeister Schmidt
- Hans Staufen as Kellner Fritz Hellmann
- Paula Helmert as Frau Schmidt
- Ferdinand Richter as Kommis
- Berhold Weiss as Kellner
- Max Obal
- Bruno Lopinski
- Helene Voß

== Bibliography ==
- Jennifer M. Kapczynski & Michael D. Richardson. A New History of German Cinema.
