= Ilka Grüning =

Austrian-Hungarian actress

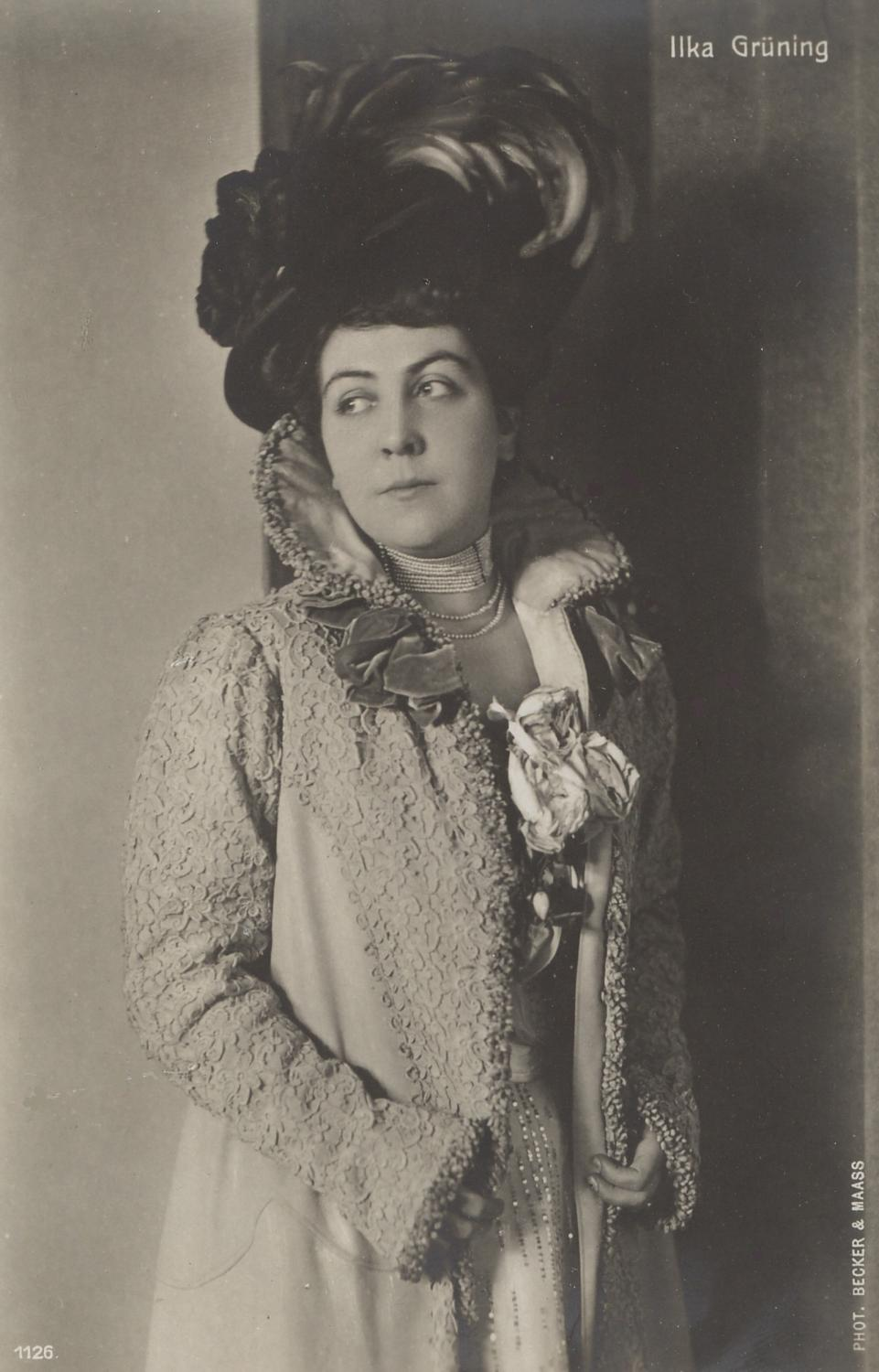
- Grüning in 1900
- Born: Ilka Henriette Grunzweig; 4 September 1876; Vienna, Austria-Hungary
- Died: 11 November 1964 (aged 88); Los Angeles, California, U.S.
- Resting place: Woodlawn Memorial Cemetery, Santa Monica, California
- Occupation: Actress
- Years active: 1919–1953

Ilka Grüning (born Ilka Henriette Grünzweig; 4 September 1876 – 11 November 1964) was an Austrian-Hungarian actress. Born in Vienna in the old Austrian-Hungarian Empire, she was one of many Jewish actors and actresses that were forced to flee Europe when the Nazis came to power in 1933. A respected and famous actress of her time in the German-language area, she was forced to play bit parts in Hollywood.

== Career ==
=== German career ===
At age 17, Ilka Grüning made her stage debut in Miss Julie and quickly became a famous stage actress. Grüning's first film, at age 43, was a German silent movie called Todesurteil in 1919. Next, she starred with Conrad Veidt in Peer Gynt. Later that year, she and Veidt appeared in Die sich verkaufen.

She continued making silent movies in Germany into the 1920s. In 1920, she appeared in the film Die Bestie im Menschen, based on the novel La Bête humaine by Émile Zola. This were two of 11 films she appeared in that year. Grüning appeared in Veidt's two Christian Wahnschaffe movies: Weltbrand in 1920 and Die Flucht aus dem goldenen Kerker in 1921. In 1922, she had a small part as a landlady in Lady Hamilton starring Veidt as Lord Horatio Nelson. This was one of four movies that she and Hans Twardowski appeared in together; F.W. Murnau's drama Phantom, Es leuchtet meine Liebe and The False Dimitri.

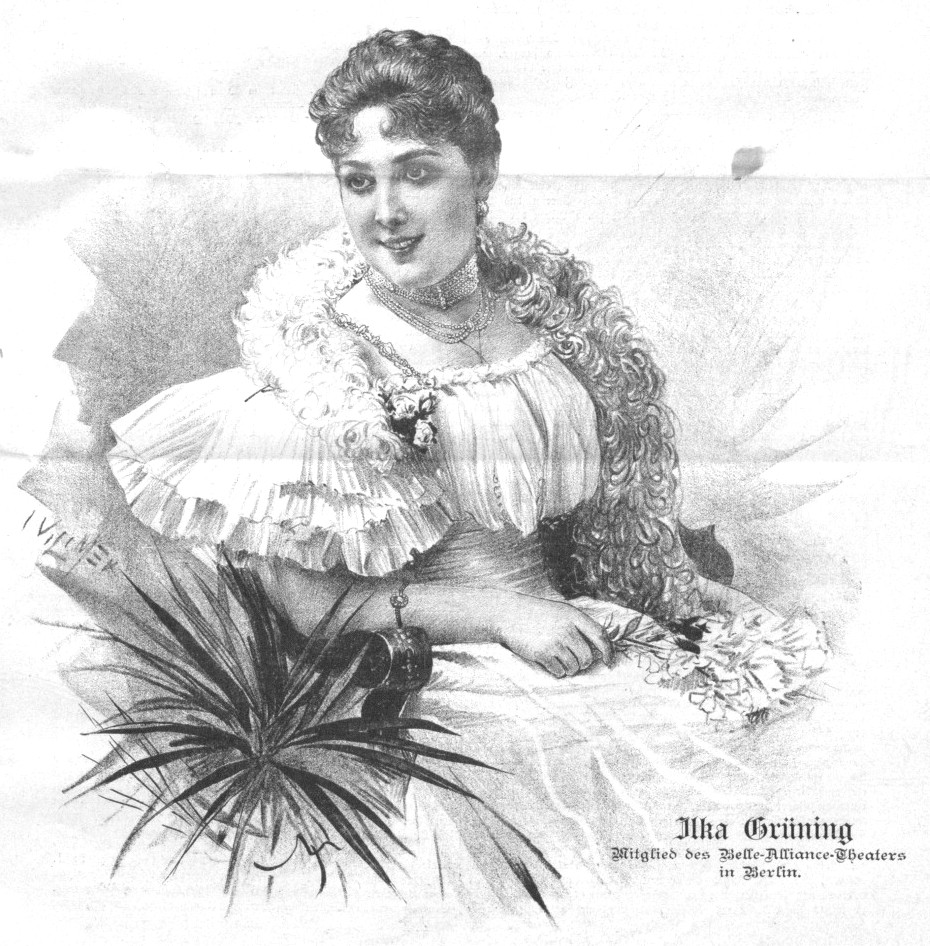
Ilka Grüning, drawing in 1898

In 1923, she portrayed Frau Gött in Max Mack's The Beautiful Girl. Later that year, she portrayed the wife of Johann Friedrich Schiller in Friedrich Schiller - The Young Poet. Next she played Rosalindes' mother in Max Mack's Die Fledermaus (this was the fifth film she did with the German director). In 1924, she appeared in F.W. Murnau's drama The Grand Duke's Finances (this was the third film she made with Murnau).

In 1925, Grüning appeared in the silent Joyless Street, directed by Georg Wilhelm Pabst, which featured a 20-year-old Greta Garbo. The following year, Grüning appeared in her third Pabst' movie Secrets of a Soul. In 1927, Grüning appeared in Hello Caesar! which S.Z. Sakall helped write. Later that year, she and Sakall appeared together in Family Gathering in the House of Prellstein.

In 1929, Grüning appeared in her first sound film: Melody of the Heart. It was three years before she appeared in another film. In 1932, she received a part in Max Neufeld's Hasenklein kann nichts dafür, which was her last movie in Germany. It was nine years before she appeared in another movie.

=== American career ===
Grüning, had played Strindberg and Ibsen for Austrian director Max Reinhardt and had run the second most important drama school in Berlin, left 1938 Germany after Hitler and the Nazis came to power. After arriving in America in February 1939, she received help from the European Film Fund in resettling to America. With the outbreak of World War II and the need for older German women for war movies, Grüning started receiving parts. Her first Hollywood movie was in 1941 as Erwin Kalser's husband in Warner Bros.' war drama Underground, starring Philip Dorn, Martin Kosleck and Ludwig Stössel (who played her husband in Casablanca).

Grüning was busy in 1942. First, Grüning appeared in Kings Row, Dangerously They Live, Friendly Enemies the Sonja Henie film Iceland, and Desperate Journey.

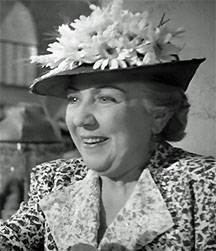
Ilka Grüning as Mrs. Leuchtag in Casablanca (1942)

Also in 1942, at the age of 66, Grüning received the role of Mrs. Leuchtag, who along with her husband (played by Ludwig Stössel) are leaving Europe for America in Casablanca. She has only one scene (a total of 30 words) in the movie when she and her husband are having a drink in Rick's Cafe with their good friend Carl the waiter (S. Z. Sakall) and struggling a bit with their English. Her husband (Ludwig Stössel) asks her for the time "Liebchen – sweetnessheart, what watch?" She answers "Ten watch", and he replies "Such much?"

In 1943, Grüning received a bit part as George Tobias's mother in This Is the Army. Next she appeared in The Strange Death of Adolf Hitler with Stössel and Twardowski. Grüning received bit parts in Madame Curie starring Greer Garson and Walter Pidgeon as the Curies. Grüning appeared in only one movie in 1944 as Mrs. Vronsky in the drama An American Romance. She had a bit part in the mystery Murder in the Music Hall. She received a couple of other small parts that year; the first as Herman Bing's wife in Rendezvous 24.

Next Grüning and Stössel got to play husband and wife again as the Muellers in Temptation. The following year, she played Paul E. Burns's wife in Desperate. Other movies included Repeat Performance, Letter from an Unknown Woman, A Foreign Affair, and Words and Music.

In 1949, she played a grandmother in Caught. Grüning and Stössel appeared in their last film together in the drama The Great Sinner. She played another old woman in Mr. Soft Touch with Glenn Ford.

In 1950, she received a good part as Edgar Bergen's wife in the adventure film Captain China. She had another good role in Convicted. The following year, she appeared as Brett King's mother in Payment on Demand. Her last Hollywood movie was as Mama Ludwig in the western Passage West.

=== Short return to Germany ===
Like many German and Austrian actors, Grüning went back to Berlin in the 1950s, but found that Germany was not the same country she had left. Many former Nazis returned, and it became difficult for Grüning to integrate back into the film industry. She did, at age 76, appear in a small, Swiss movie in 1952 titled Die Venus vom Tivoli, which was her last movie. After this role, Grüning returned to the U.S.

=== Death ===
Grüning died on November 11, 1964, in Los Angeles at the age of 88. She was cremated and her ashes rest at Woodlawn Memorial Cemetery, Santa Monica.

== Selected filmography ==
- Peer Gynt – 2. Teil: Peer Gynts Wanderjahre und Tod (1919) – Aase
- Peer Gynt (1919) – Aase
- Pogrom (1919) – Wera Cheberiak
- Prostitution (1919)
- Rose Bernd (1919) – Frau Flamm
- Todesurteil (1919)
- Der Sklave seiner Leidenschaft (1920)
- Monika Vogelsang (1920) – Witwe Walterspiel
- Mary Magdalene (1920) – Ehefrau von Meister Anton
- Das Grauen (1920) – Mutter Claar
- Eine Demimonde-Heirat (1920) – Anuschka
- Können Gedanken töten? (1920) – Bäuerin
- The Prisoner (1920)
- The Marriage of Figaro (1920) – Marcelline
- Fanny Elssler (1920)
- Der Abenteurer von Paris (1920)
- Catherine the Great (1920)
- Christian Wahnschaffe (1920)
- Menschen (1920)
- Die Bestie im Menschen (1920)
- Hannerl and Her Lovers (1921)
- The Conspiracy in Genoa (1921) – Matrone
- Die Diktatur der Liebe, 2. Teil – Die Welt ohne Liebe (1921) – Ihre Mutter
- Die große und die kleine Welt (1921) – Frau aus dem Volke
- Aus den Tiefen der Großstadt (1921)
- About the Son (1921)
- The Fateful Day (1921) – Gräfin
- The Stranger from Alster Street (1921)
- Trix, the Romance of a Millionairess (1921)
- The Inheritance of Tordis (1921) – seine Frau
- Seafaring Is Necessary (1921)
- Der Leidensweg eines Achtzehnjährigen (1921)
- Memoirs of a Film Actress (1921)
- The Story of Christine von Herre (1921) – Die alte Comtesse
- Lady Hamilton (1921) – Eine Wirtin
- Das zweite Leben (1921)
- Die Schuldige (1921) – Gräfin Wuthenow
- Lotte Lore (1921)
- Die Geheimnisse von Berlin, 3. Teil – Berlin-Moabit. Hinter Gitterfenstern (1921)
- Die Kreutzersonate (1922) – Frau Suchoff
- Die Dame und der Landstreicher (1922)
- Die siebtente Nacht (1922) – Frau Freese
- Aus den Erinnerungen eines Frauenarztes – 2. Lüge und Wahrheit (1922)
- Jenseits des Stromes (1922)
- Luise Millerin (1922) – Millerin
- Youth (1922)
- Power of Temptation (1922)
- Phantom (1922) – Baronin / Baroness
- Es leuchtet meine Liebe (1922) – Mutter von Saint Just
- Bigamy (1922)
- The False Dimitri (1922) – Amme Pawlowa
- Two Worlds (1922)
- Wem nie durch Liebe Leid geschah! (1922)
- The Big Shot (1922) – Frau Steinreich
- The Anthem of Love (1922)
- Tiefland (1923) – Die Duenna
- Nora (1923) – Marianne, Noras alte Amme
- The Treasure (1923) – Anna
- Friedrich Schiller (1923) – Elisabeth Dorothea, seine Frau
- The Woman on the Panther (1923)
- Die Fledermaus (1923) – Rosalindes Mutter
- Der Menschenfeind (1923)
- Der rote Reiter (1923)
- Resurrection (1923)
- Daisy (1923)
- Freund Ripp (1923)
- The Beautiful Girl (1923) – Frau Gött
- The Grand Duke's Finances (1924) – Augustine, die Köchin
- The Creature (1924)
- Mater dolorosa (1924)
- Kaddish (1924)
- Debit and Credit (1924) – Madame Sidonie Ehrenthal
- Gehetzte Menschen (1924) – Frau Garson
- Die Liebesbriefe einer Verlassenen (1924)
- Joyless Street (1925) – Frau Rosenow
- The Dice Game of Life (1925) – Emils Mutter
- The Elegant Bunch (1925) – Leos Mutter
- Secrets of a Soul (1926) – Die mutter
- Hello Caesar! (1927) – Frau Svoboda
- The Transformation of Dr. Bessel (1927) – Frau Regierer
- Family Gathering in the House of Prellstein (1927) – Seraphine
- Autumn on the Rhine (1928) – Frau Holm
- Dyckerpotts' Heirs (1928)
- The Three Kings (1928) – Landlady
- The Crimson Circle (1929) – Eine Vermieterin
- Zwischen vierzehn und siebzehn – Sexualnot der Jugend (1929)
- Melody of the Heart (1929) – Fräulein Czibulka
- Hasenklein kann nichts dafür (1932) – Frau Hasenklein
- Underground (1941) – Frau Franken
- Dangerously They Live (1941) – Mrs. Steiner
- Kings Row (1942) – Anna
- Friendly Enemies (1942) – Mrs. Pfeiffer
- Iceland (1942) – Aunt Sophie (uncredited)
- Desperate Journey (1942) – Frau Brahms
- Casablanca (1942) – Mrs. Leuchtag (uncredited)
- This Is the Army (1943) – Mrs. Twardofsky (uncredited)
- The Strange Death of Adolf Hitler (1943) – Middle-Class woman
- There's Something About a Soldier (1943) – Anna Grybinski (uncredited)
- Madame Curie (1943) – Seamstress (uncredited)
- Address Unknown (1944) – Grandma (uncredited)
- An American Romance (1944) – Mrs. Vronsky (uncredited)
- Murder in the Music Hall (1946) – Mom
- Rendezvous 24 (1946) – Frau Schmidt (uncredited)
- Temptation (1946) – Frau Mueller (uncredited)
- Repeat Performance (1947) – Mattie
- Desperate (1947) – Aunt Klara
- Letter from an Unknown Woman (1948) – Ticket-Taker (uncredited)
- Raw Deal (1948) – Fran – Oscar's Housekeeper (uncredited)
- A Foreign Affair (1948) – German Wife (uncredited)
- Words and Music (1948) – Mrs. Rogers
- Caught (1949) – Grandmother Rudetzki (uncredited)
- The Great Sinner (1949) – Pauline's Duenna (uncredited)
- Mr. Soft Touch (1949) – Old Woman (uncredited)
- Captain China (1950) – Mrs. Haasvelt
- Convicted (1950) – Martha Lorry (uncredited)
- Payment on Demand (1951) – Mrs. Polanski (uncredited)
- Passage West (1951) – Mama Ludwig
- The Venus of Tivoli (1953) – Frau Stransky
