= Friedrich Schiller (1923 film) =

1923 film

- Directed by: Curt Goetz
- Written by: Curt Goetz; Max Kaufmann
- Produced by: Curt Goetz
- Starring: Theodor Loos; Hermann Vallentin; Ilka Grüning
- Cinematography: Hans Scholz; Otto Tober
- Production company: Goetz-Film
- Release date: 23 March 1923
- Running time: 111 minutes
- Country: Germany
- Languages: Silent; German intertitles

Friedrich Schiller is a 1923 German silent historical film directed by Curt Goetz and starring Theodor Loos, Hermann Vallentin, and Ilka Grüning. It is a biopic of the life of the eighteenth century writer Friedrich Schiller. In 2005 the film was restored with a slightly shorter running length.

The film's sets were designed by the art director Julian Ballenstedt. Location shooting took place in Stuttgart.

== Cast ==
- Theodor Loos Friedrich Schiller
- Hermann Vallentin as Herzog Karl Eugen von Württemberg
- Isabel Heermann as Gräfin Franziska von Hohenheim
- Max Pategg as Johann Kaspar Schiller, Werbeoffizier
- Ilka Grüning as Elisabeth Dorothea, seine Frau
- Robert Leffler as Pastor Christoph Moser
- Egmont Richter as Christian Friedrich Daniel Schubart
- Berta Monnard as Seine Frau
- Heilo Böhlen as Ludwig, deren Sohn
- Rudolf Klein-Rhoden as Der Amtmann von Blaubeuren
- Hans Carl Mueller as Kapf, Schillers Freund
- Erich Walter as Scharffenstein, Schillers Freund
- Martin Gien as Petersen, Freund Schillers
- Walter Kassing as Hoven, Freund Schillers
- Kitty Aschenbach as Luise Bischerin, Hauptmannswitwe
- Paul Bildt as Andreas Streicher, Musikus
- Carl Jönsson as Herzog Karl August von Weimar
- Max Kaufmann a sGoethe
- Philipp Manning as Intendant von Dahlberg
- Ernst Legal as Iffland
- Gottfried Kraus as General Rieger
- Wilhelm Diegelmann as Nies, Aufseher der Karlsschule
- Herbert Stock as Brodhag, Ochsenwirt in Stuttgart
- Josefine Dora as Putzfrau

== Bibliography ==
- Klossner, Michael (2002). The Europe of 1500–1815 on Film and Television: A Worldwide Filmography of Over 2550 Works, 1895 Through 2000. Jefferson, NC: McFarland. ISBN 978-0-7864-1223-5.
