= The False Asta Nielsen =

1915 film directed by Urban Gad

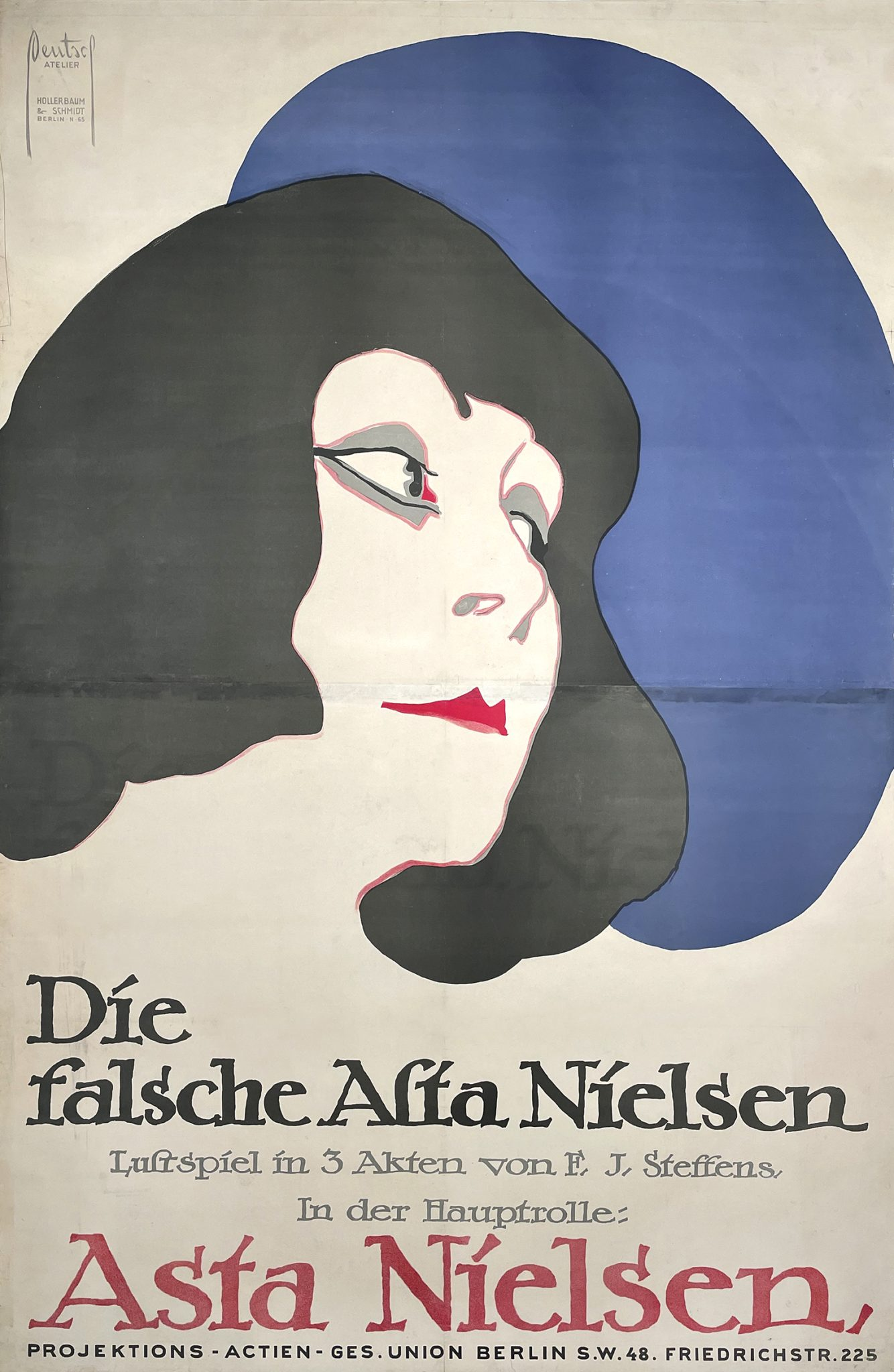
- Directed by: Urban Gad
- Starring: Asta Nielsen
- Production company: PAGU
- Release date: 10 December 1915
- Country: Germany
- Languages: Silent; German intertitles

The False Asta Nielsen (German: Die falsche Asta Nielsen) is a 1915 German silent film directed by Urban Gad and starring Asta Nielsen and Victor Arnold.

== Cast ==
- Asta Nielsen as Die Barbierstochter Bolette
- Victor Arnold as Der Barbier
- Fred Immler
- E. Dietsch as The Baron

== Bibliography ==
- Jennifer M. Kapczynski & Michael D. Richardson. A New History of German Cinema.
