= Gipsy Blood (1911 film) =

1911 film directed by Urban Gad

- Directed by: Urban Gad
- Written by: Urban Gad
- Starring: Asta Nielsen; Georg Schrader; Leo Peukert
- Cinematography: Guido Seeber
- Production companies: Deutsche Bioscop; PAGU
- Release date: 17 April 1911
- Running time: 42 minutes
- Country: Germany
- Languages: Silent; German intertitles

Gipsy Blood (German: Heißes Blut) is a 1911 German silent drama film directed and written by Urban Gad and starring Asta Nielsen, Georg Schrader, and Leo Peukert.

It was Asta Nielsen's first film in Germany following the success of The Abyss. It was shot at the Deutsche Bioscope studios at 123 Chausseestraße in Berlin.

== Plot ==
Jonna, a married woman with a daughter, begins an affair with their chauffeur. Her husband discovers this and fires the chauffeur and files for divorce. Jonna falls into a life of poverty and in an act of desperation steals from her ex-husband. He calls the police but their daughter, who is ill, recognises her mother and calls out for her. Jonna realises the error of her ways and her duties as a mother. Her husband forgives her and takes her back.

== Cast ==
- Asta Nielsen as Jonna
- Georg Schrader as Chauffeur
- Leo Peukert as Jonna’s husband
