= Family Gathering in the House of Prellstein =

1927 film

- Sig Arno and Erika Glässner in a scene from the film
- German: Familientag im Hause Prellstein
- Directed by: Hans Steinhoff
- Written by: Viktor Klein; Paul Morgan
- Produced by: Lupu Pick
- Starring: S. Z. Sakall; Erika Glässner; Sig Arno; Paul Morgan
- Cinematography: Curt Courant
- Production company: Rex-Film
- Distributed by: UFA
- Release date: 16 December 1927
- Country: Germany
- Languages: Silent; German intertitles

Family Gathering in the House of Prellstein (German: Familientag im Hause Prellstein) is a 1927 German silent comedy film directed by Hans Steinhoff and starring S. Z. Sakall, Erika Glässner and Sig Arno.

== Cast ==
- S. Z. Sakall as Sami Bambus
- Erika Glässner as Flora Bambus, geb. Bimbaum
- Sig Arno as Prellstein
- Paul Morgan as David Freundlich
- Anton Herrnfeld as Jaromir Schestak
- Karl Etlinger as Moritz Igel
- Fritz Spira as Salomon Stern
- Ilka Grüning as Seraphine
- Max Ehrlich as Ober im Café International
