= According to Law =

1919 film

- Directed by: Willy Grunwald
- Written by: Louis Levy
- Starring: Asta Nielsen
- Cinematography: Max Lutze
- Production company: Cserépy-Film
- Release date: 26 September 1919
- Country: Germany
- Languages: Silent; German intertitles

According to Law (German: Nach dem Gesetz) is a 1919 German silent film directed by Willy Grunwald and starring Asta Nielsen and Georgine Sobjeska. It was inspired by Dostoevsky's Crime and Punishment.

== Cast ==
- Georgine Sobjeska as Widow Waler
- Asta Nielsen as Sonja Waler - Journalist - the Widow's Daughter
- Otz Tollen as Dr. Erich Waler - Her Son
- Theodor Loos as Albert Holm, inventor
- Fritz Hartwig as Arthur Wolf - journalist
- Willy Kaiser-Heyl as Professor Wedel
- Henri Peters-Arnolds as Wedel's Son
- Guido Herzfeld as Heere - Loan Shark
- Bernhard Goetzke

== Bibliography ==
- Usai, Paolo Cherchi (1991). Codelli, Lorenzo (ed.). Before Caligari: German Cinema, 1895–1920. University of Wisconsin Press. ISBN 978-0-299-97075-8.
