= Break-in (film) =

1927 film

- German: Einbruch
- Directed by: Franz Osten
- Written by: Alexander Alexander; Artur Landsberger (play); Ralph Arthur Roberts (play)
- Starring: Erika Glässner; Camilla von Hollay; Ralph Arthur Roberts
- Cinematography: Franz Planer
- Music by: Otto Stenzeel
- Production company: Ama-Film
- Distributed by: Messtro-Film
- Release date: 2 May 1927
- Country: Germany
- Languages: Silent; German intertitles

Break-in (German: Einbruch) is a 1927 German crime film directed by Franz Osten and starring Erika Glässner, Camilla von Hollay and Ralph Arthur Roberts.

The film's sets were designed by the art director Max Heilbronner.

== Cast ==
- Erika Glässner as Jutta Percha, Film diva
- Camilla von Hollay as Paula
- Ralph Arthur Roberts as Max Plettke
- Paul Morgan as Polenwilli, a heavy boy
- Kurt Gerron as Willi, ein noch schwererer Junge
- Maria Forescu as Wirtin
- Julius Falkenstein as Count Parisello
- Albert Paulig as Dr. Schmidt, Detective Commissioner
- Nina Rinewa as Elfriede
- Leni Sponholz
- Gyula Szőreghy
