= The Beautiful Girl (1923 film) =

German silent film

- German: Das schöne Mädel
- Directed by: Max Mack
- Written by: Georg Hirschfeld (novel)
- Produced by: Hella Moja
- Starring: Hella Moja; Fritz Richard; Ilka Grüning
- Cinematography: Carl Blumenberg; Eugen Hamm
- Production company: Hella Moja-Film
- Release date: 1923
- Country: Germany
- Languages: Silent; German intertitles

The Beautiful Girl (German: Das schöne Mädel) is a 1923 German silent film directed by Max Mack and starring Hella Moja, Fritz Richard and Ilka Grüning.

The film's sets were designed by the art director Carl Ludwig Kirmse.

== Cast ==
- Hella Moja as Gött's daughter
- Fritz Richard as old Gött
- Ilka Grüning as Frau Gött
- Walter Rilla as Franz, Gött's son
- Margit Barnay as Gött's daughter
- Rudolf Klein-Rhoden as Wyslicenus
- Ernst Pröckl as Student Kunze
- Heinz Salfner as Prof. Wessely
- Alfred Haase as Baron von Riemer
- Ludwig Hartau as Rubiner, department store owner
- Dora Bergner as Frau Rubiner, his wife
- Hermann Blaß as Balduin, photograph
- Fred Immler as gentleman
- Ludwig Rex as doctor
- Hermann Picha as antiquearian
