= So Ends My Song =

- Directed by: Willy Grunwald
- Starring: Asta Nielsen
- Cinematography: Gustave Preiss
- Production company: Cserépy-Film
- Release date: 18 June 1919
- Country: Germany
- Languages: Silent; German intertitles

So Ends My Song (German:Das Ende vom Liede) is a 1919 German silent film directed by Willy Grunwald and starring Asta Nielsen and Marga Köhler.

== Cast ==
- Asta Nielsen as Dora Waren
- Marga Köhler as Agathe von Waren
- Julius Geisendörfer as Kurt von Reppen
- Joseph Römer as Dr. Torsten
- Fritz Wrede as Bankier Holst
- Olga Wojan as Luise Kern
- Robert Hartmann as Diener Franz
- Max Zilzer

== Bibliography ==
- Hans-Michael Bock and Tim Bergfelder. The Concise Cinegraph: An Encyclopedia of German Cinema. Berghahn Books.
