= Dora Brandes =

1916 film

- Directed by: Magnus Stifter
- Written by: Martin Jørgensen, Louis Levy
- Starring: Asta Nielsen
- Cinematography: Carl Ferdinand Fischer
- Production company: Neutral-Film
- Distributed by: GmbH on bahlf of Saturn-Film, Berlin
- Release date: 16 August 1916
- Running time: 85 minutes
- Country: Germany
- Languages: Silent; German intertitles

Dora Brandes is a 1916 German silent film directed by Magnus Stifter, starring Asta Nielsen, with a screenplay by Martin Jørgensen, and Louis Levy. Dora is an actress who is involved with a politician, Gustave, as her lover. With money from Dora's former admirer, she decides to help further Gustave's political career. Once he becomes a parliamentary deputy, he achieves his goals and leaves Dora. Dora cannot handle the betrayal and begins to drink and starts on a social decline. Years later, Gustave becomes a minister and Dora returns to his life to help him yet again with his career. Gustave does not accept Dora as a lover again due to her ill past, causing Dora to commit suicide.

== Cast ==
- Asta Nielsen as Dora Brandes
- Ludwig Trautmann as Gustav Calvia, journalist
- Max Laurance as Grev d'Albert, politiker

== Bibliography ==
- Allen, Julie K. (2013). Icons of Danish Modernity: Georg Brandes and Asta Nielsen. Seattle: University of Washington Press. ISBN 978-0-295-80436-1.
