= The Love Corridor =

1921 film directed by Urban Gad

- Directed by: Urban Gad
- Written by: Willy Rath
- Starring: Adolphe Engers; Erika Glässner
- Cinematography: Eugen Hamm
- Production company: Terra Film
- Distributed by: Terra Film
- Release date: 4 February 1921
- Country: Germany
- Languages: Silent; German intertitles

The Love Corridor (German: Der Liebeskorridor) is a 1921 German silent comedy film directed by Urban Gad and starring Anton Edthofer, Adolphe Engers and Erika Glässner.

== Cast ==
- Anton Edthofer as Graf Troll
- Adolphe Engers as Wuttke
- Erika Glässner
- Jenny Marba
- Hermann Picha
- Felix Stärk

== Bibliography ==
- Grange, William. Cultural Chronicle of the Weimar Republic. Scarecrow Press, 2008.
