= The Eskimo Baby =

- Directed by: Heinz Schall
- Written by: Martin Jørgensen; Louis Levy
- Produced by: Alfred Duskes
- Starring: Asta Nielsen
- Cinematography: Carl Ferdinand Fischer
- Production company: Neutral-Film
- Release date: 4 April 1918
- Running time: 65 minutes
- Country: Germany
- Languages: Silent; German intertitles

The Eskimo Baby (German: Das Eskimobaby) is a 1918 German silent comedy film directed by Heinz Schall and starring Asta Nielsen and Freddy Wingardh.

== Cast ==
- Asta Nielsen as Eskimo Ivigtut
- Freddy Wingardh as Knud Prätorius

== Bibliography ==
- Annette Kuhn. The Women's Companion to International Film. University of California Press, 1990.
