= Diamonds (1920 film) =

1920 film

- Directed by: Friedrich Feher
- Written by: Johannes Brandt; Robert Wiene
- Starring: Louis Ralph; Erika Glässner; Julius Brandt; Paul Morgan
- Cinematography: Eugen Hamm
- Production company: Ungo-Film
- Release date: December 1920
- Country: Germany
- Languages: Silent; German intertitles

Diamonds (German: Brillianten) is a 1920 German silent crime film directed by Friedrich Feher and starring Louis Ralph, Erika Glässner, and Julius Brandt. A policeman goes undercover to unmask a customs officer as corrupt. Feher's direction was criticised for being too loose.

== Cast ==
- Louis Ralph
- Erika Glässner
- Julius Brandt
- Paul Morgan

== Bibliography ==
- Jung, Uli; Schatzberg, Walter (1999). Beyond Caligari: The Films of Robert Wiene. New York: Berghahn Books. ISBN 978-1-57181-156-1.
