= Alfred Duskes =

German film producer and director

- Born: 1881; German Empire
- Died: 1918 (aged 36–37)
- Occupations: Director, Producer
- Years active: 1905-1918 (film)

Alfred Duskes (1881-1918) was a German film producer and director. He was one of the German pioneers of the silent era, setting up his first production company in 1905. In 1912 he founded the original Tempelhof Studios, with financial backing from the French company Pathé.

== Selected filmography ==
- The Eskimo Baby (1918)
- Rose of the Wilderness (1918)

== Bibliography ==
- Thomas Elsaesser & Michael Wedel. A Second Life: German Cinema's First Decades. Amsterdam University Press, 1996.
