= Otz Tollen =

German actor and film director

Otz Tollen (9 April 1882 – 19 July 1965) was a German actor and film director.

Born in Berlin, he made his film debut in the 1912 Joe May directed film In der Tiefe des Schachtes. His last film role was an appearance in the 1960 Nadja Tiller film The Ambassador.

== Selected filmography ==
=== Actor ===
- According to Law (1919)
- Curfew (1925)
- The Great Opportunity (1925)
- Wrath of the Seas (1926)
- I Once Had a Comrade (1926)
- The Standard-Bearer of Sedan (1927)
- Hands Up, Eddy Polo (1928)
- Unternehmen Michael (1937)
- Gewitterflug zu Claudia (1937)
- Patriots (1937)
- Togger (1937)
- Signal in the Night (1937)
- Seven Slaps (1937)
- Eine Nacht im Mai (1938)
- Secret Code LB 17 (1938)
- The Sensational Casilla Trial (1939)
- The Governor (1939)
- Jud Süß (1940)
- Der große König (1942)
- The Little Residence (1942)
- The Crew of the Dora (1943)
- The Endless Road (1943)
- The Roedern Affair (1944)
- Kolberg (1945)
- The Court Concert (1948)
- Don't Ask My Heart (1952)
- Winter in the Woods (1956)
- Stresemann (1957)
- The Ambassador (1960)

=== Screenwriter ===
- Prinz Louis Ferdinand (1927)

=== Director ===
- The Skull of Pharaoh's Daughter (1920)
- The Black Count (1920)

== Bibliography ==
- Elley, Derek. The Epic Film: Myth and History. Routledge, 1984.
