= Rose of the Wilderness =

- Directed by: Walter Schmidthässler
- Written by: Louis Levy
- Produced by: Alfred Duskes
- Starring: Asta Nielsen
- Cinematography: Carl Ferdinand Fischer
- Release date: 27 February 1918
- Country: Germany
- Languages: Silent; German intertitles

Rose of the Wilderness (German:Die Rose der Wildnis) is a 1918 German silent film directed by Walter Schmidthässler and starring Asta Nielsen and Curt Goetz.

== Cast ==
- Curt Goetz
- Asta Nielsen as Wanda
- Joseph Schröder
- Magnus Stifter

== Bibliography ==
- Lloyd, Ann. Movies of the Silent Years. Orbis, 1984.
