= Hello Caesar! =

1927 film

- Directed by: Reinhold Schünzel
- Written by: S. Z. Sakall; Reinhold Schünzel
- Produced by: Reinhold Schünzel
- Starring: Reinhold Schünzel; Mary Nolan; Wilhelm Diegelmann
- Cinematography: Ludwig Lippert
- Production company: Reinhold Schünzel Film
- Distributed by: UFA
- Release date: 5 May 1927
- Running time: 90 minutes
- Country: Germany
- Languages: Silent; German intertitles

Hello Caesar! (German: Halloh – Caesar!) is a 1927 German silent comedy film directed by Reinhold Schünzel and starring Schünzel, Mary Nolan, and Wilhelm Diegelmann. It is partly set in the spa town of Karlsbad in Czechoslovakia.

== Cast ==
- Reinhold Schünzel as Caesar, Artist
- Mary Nolan
- Wilhelm Diegelmann as Willard, Varietédirektor
- Julius Falkenstein as Baron von Glatzenstein
- Ilka Grüning as Frau Svoboda
- Paul Kretschmar as Zwillingsbrüder
- Richard Kretschmar as Zwillingsbrüder
- Toni Philippi as Rosl, Tochter von Frau Svoboda

== Bibliography ==
- Grange, William (2008). Cultural Chronicle of the Weimar Republic. Lanham, MD: Scarecrow Press. ISBN 978-0-8108-5967-8.
