= The Dance of Death (1912 film) =

1912 film directed by Urban Gad

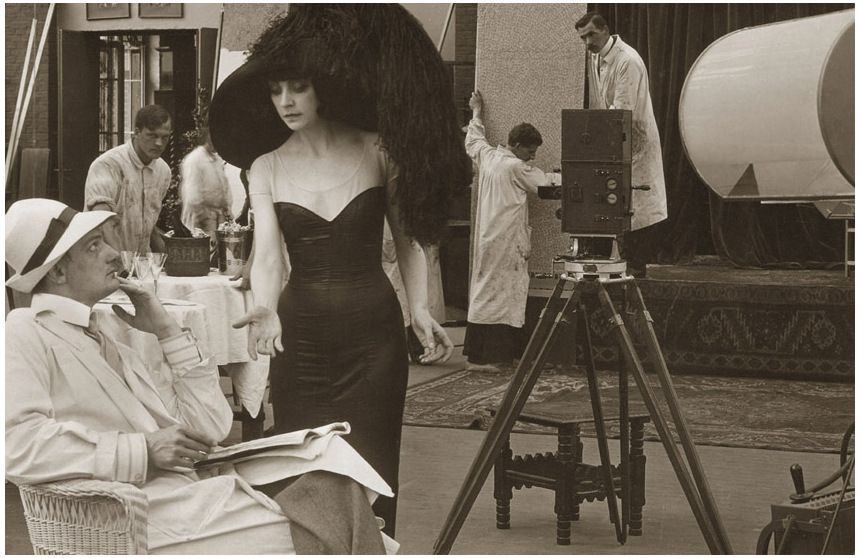
- Urban Gad, Asta Nielsen, The Dance of Death
- Directed by: Urban Gad
- Written by: Urban Gad
- Starring: Asta Nielsen
- Cinematography: Guido Seeber
- Production company: Deutsche Bioscop for PAGU
- Release date: 7 September 1912
- Country: Germany
- Languages: Silent; German intertitles

The Dance of Death (German: Der Totentanz) is a 1912 German silent film directed by Urban Gad and starring Gad's wife Asta Nielsen. It was one of the first films made at the new Babelsberg Studio in Berlin.

== Cast ==
- Asta Nielsen as Bella Burk
- Oskar Fuchs as Ingenieur Burk
- Fritz Weidemann as Komponist Czerneck
- Fred Immler
- Emil Albes

== Bibliography ==
- Jennifer M. Kapczynski & Michael D. Richardson. A New History of German Cinema.
