= Jan Vermeulen, the Miller of Flanders =

1917 film

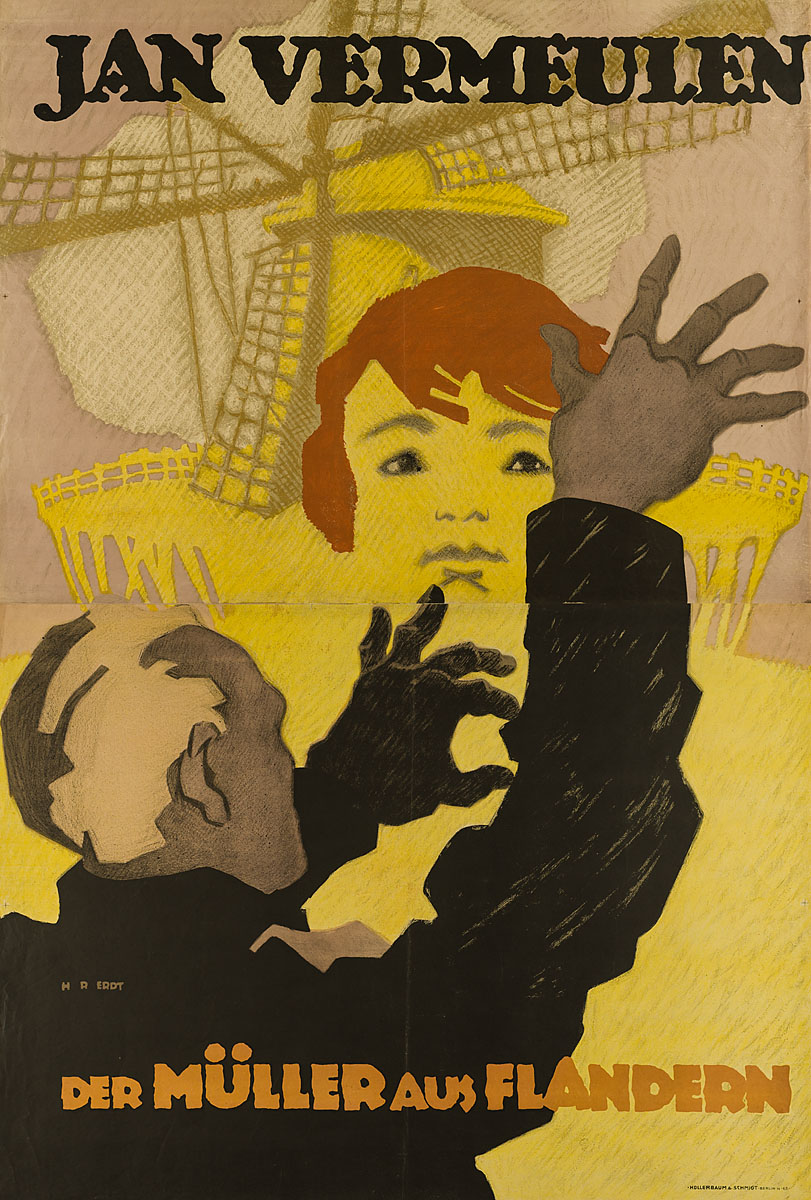
- German film poster
- German: Jan Vermeulen, der Müller aus Flandern
- Directed by: Georg Jacoby
- Written by: Georg Jacoby
- Production company: BUFA
- Distributed by: BUFA
- Release date: 3 August 1917
- Running time: 51 minutes
- Country: Germany
- Languages: Silent; German intertitles

Jan Vermeulen, the Miller of Flanders (German: Jan Vermeulen, der Müller aus Flandern) is a 1917 German silent war drama film directed by Georg Jacoby. It was made as a propaganda film by the German film agency BUFA, which generally specialised in making documentaries but also made feature films such as this and Dr. Hart's Diary.

Location shooting took place around Bruges and Ghent in German-occupied Belgian Flanders.

== Cast ==
- Richard Bruno as Müller Jan Vermeulen
- Rose Veldtkirch as Müllerin Marianne Vermeulen
- Karl Berger as Arzt Genesius
- Fred Immler as Lehrer Johann Freihardt
- Alfred Jürgens as Sohn Pieter Vermeulen
- Léo Lasko as Müllersknecht

== Bibliography ==
- Bock, Hans-Michael & Bergfelder, Tim. The Concise CineGraph. Encyclopedia of German Cinema. Berghahn Books, 2009.
