= Cinderella (1916 film) =

1916 film directed by Urban Gad

- German: Aschenbrödel
- Directed by: Urban Gad
- Based on: Cinderella
- Starring: Asta Nielsen; Max Landa
- Cinematography: Urban Gad; Axel Graatkjær
- Production company: PAGU
- Release date: 1 December 1916
- Country: Germany
- Languages: Silent; German intertitles

Cinderella (German: Aschenbrödel) is a 1916 German silent film directed by Urban Gad and starring Asta Nielsen and Max Landa. It is based on the fairytale of the same name.

== Cast ==
- Asta Nielsen as Lotte
- Max Landa as von Harten
