= Victor Arnold (Austrian actor) =

Austrian actor

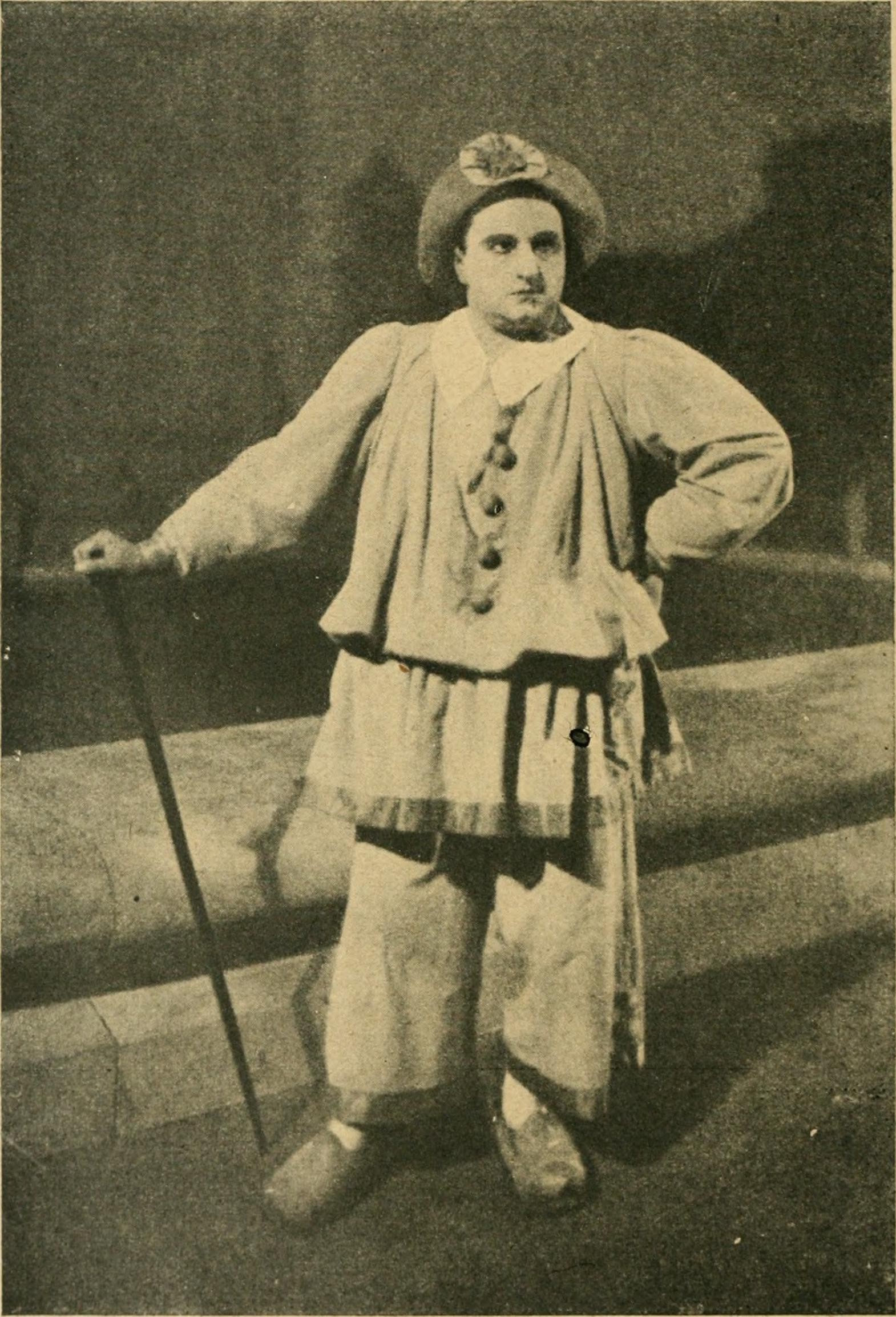
- Arnold as George Dandin
- Born: 9 October 1873; Vienna, Austria-Hungary
- Died: 16 October 1914 (aged 41); Dresden, German Empire
- Occupation: Actor
- Years active: 1910–1914

Victor Arnold (9 October 1873 – 16 October 1914) was an Austrian actor. He appeared in six films from 1910 to 1914.

== Selected filmography ==
Year	Title	Role	Notes
1915	The False Asta Nielsen		
1915	Frontstairs and Backstairs		
1914	The Firm Gets Married		
