= Eugen Hamm =

German cinematographer

Eugen Hamm (3 April 1869 – 6 May 1944) was a German cinematographer.

== Selected filmography ==
- Blonde Poison (1919)
- Diamonds (1920)
- The Black Count (1920)
- The Skull of Pharaoh's Daughter (1920)
- The Love Corridor (1921)
- The Woman in the Trunk (1921)
- The Adventuress of Monte Carlo (1921)
- The Riddle of the Sphinx (1921)
- Fratricide (1922)
- Esterella (1923)
- The Beautiful Girl (1923)
- Christopher Columbus (1923)
- Za La Mort (1924)
- Mountain of Destiny (1924)
- Girls, Beware! (1928)

== Bibliography ==
- Jung, Uli & Schatzberg, Walter. Beyond Caligari: The Films of Robert Wiene. Berghahn Books, 1999.
