= Esterella =

1923 film

- Directed by: Joe Francis
- Written by: Jacques Bennet
- Cinematography: Eugen Hamm
- Production company: Universal-Film Company
- Release date: 1923
- Country: Germany
- Languages: Silent; German intertitles

Esterella is a 1923 German silent film directed by Joe Francis.

== Cast ==
In alphabetical order

- Jane Denins
- Maria Forescu
- Helmut Göze
- Lissi Lind
- Marga Reck as Esterella
- Ludwig Rex
- Eduard Rothauser

== Bibliography ==
- Rège, Philippe. Encyclopedia of French Film Directors, Volume 1. Scarecrow Press, 2009.
