= I Once Had a Comrade =

1926 film

- German: Ich hatt' einen Kameraden
- Directed by: Conrad Wiene
- Written by: Johannes Brandt
- Starring: Erich Kaiser-Titz; Otz Tollen; Erwin Fichtner
- Cinematography: Julius Balting
- Production company: International Film
- Distributed by: International Film
- Release date: 30 July 1926
- Country: Germany
- Languages: Silent; German intertitles

I Once Had a Comrade (German: Ich hatt' einen Kameraden) is a 1926 German silent film directed by Conrad Wiene and starring Erich Kaiser-Titz, Otz Tollen and Erwin Fichtner.

The film's art direction was by Robert A. Dietrich.

== Cast ==
- Erich Kaiser-Titz
- Otz Tollen
- Erwin Fichtner
- Carl de Vogt
- Louis Brody
- Hans Albers
- Olaf Fjord
- Conrad Flockner
- Bernecke Heinz
- Emil Heyse
- Fritz Kampers
- Grete Papst
- Ernst Pittschau
- Grete Reinwald
- Frida Richard
- Herbert Stock
- Iwa Wanja
- Andja Zimowa
