= The Marriage of Figaro (1920 film) =

1920 film

- Alexander Moissi
- German: Figaros Hochzeit
- Written by: Beaumarchais (play)
- Starring: Alexander Moissi; Hella Moja; Eduard von Winterstein
- Cinematography: Hans Karl Gottschalk
- Production company: Terra Film
- Distributed by: Terra Film
- Release date: 29 July 1920
- Country: Germany
- Languages: Silent; German intertitles

The Marriage of Figaro (German: Figaros Hochzeit) is a 1920 German silent comedy film directed by Max Mack and starring Alexander Moissi, Hella Moja and Eduard von Winterstein. The film was most likely accompanied by Mozart's music when it was projected.

The film is based on the 1784 play of the same name by Beaumarchais (but also on parts of the plot of the Barbier de Séville).

== Cast ==
- Alexander Moissi as Figaro, who reprised the role he had on stage
- Hella Moja as Cherubino - Figaro's page
- Eduard von Winterstein as Count Almaviva
- Vera Schwarz as The Countess
- Johanna Mund as Susanna, chambermaid
- Guido Thielscher as Antonio - gardener
- Ilka Grüning as Marcelline
- Richard Treu as Dr. Bartholo
- Paul Graetz as Bassillo
- Claire Selo as Gardener's daughter
