= Erika Glässner =

German actress

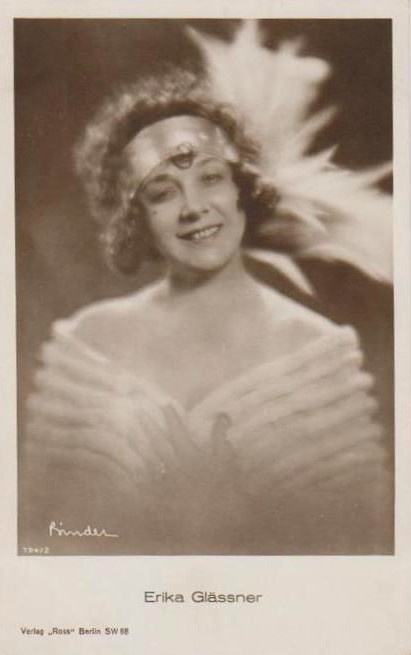
- Born: Marie Johanna Erika Glässner; 28 February 1890; Erfurt, German Empire
- Died: 21 July 1959 (aged 69); Giessen, West Germany
- Occupation: Actress
- Years active: 1910–1952
- Spouse: Arnold Kalle

Erika Glässner (28 February 1890 – 21 July 1959) was a German stage and film actress.

== Selected filmography ==
- Werner Krafft (1916)
- Diamonds (1920)
- The Three Dances of Mary Wilford (1920)
- The Love Corridor (1921)
- The Story of a Maid (1921)
- The Sins of the Mother (1921)
- The Hunt for the Truth (1921)
- Your Valet (1922)
- The Countess of Paris (1923)
- The Flower Girl of Potsdam Square (1925)
- The Marriage Swindler (1925)
- People to Each Other (1926)
- Kubinke the Barber (1926)
- Break-in (1927)
- Family Gathering in the House of Prellstein (1927)
- Children of the Street (1929)
- The Love Hotel (1933)
- Greetings and Kisses, Veronika (1933)
- Madame Wants No Children (1933)
- Paganini (1934)
- Heinz in the Moon (1934)
- Pygmalion (1935)
- Punks Arrives from America (1935)
- The Unsuspecting Angel (1936)
- Women for Golden Hill (1938)
- Left of the Isar, Right of the Spree (1940)
- Why Are You Lying, Elisabeth? (1944)
- Corinna Schmidt (1951)
- Karriere in Paris (1952)

== Bibliography ==
- Jung, Uli; Schatzberg, Walter (1999). Beyond Caligari: The Films of Robert Wiene. New York: Berghahn Books. ISBN 978-1-57181-156-1.
