= The Firm Gets Married (1914 film) =

1914 film directed by Carl Wilhelm

- Directed by: Carl Wilhelm
- Written by: Jacques Burg; Walter Turszinsky
- Produced by: Paul Davidson
- Starring: Ernst Lubitsch; Victor Arnold; Albert Paulig
- Cinematography: Friedrich Weinmann
- Production company: PAGU
- Distributed by: PAGU
- Release date: November 1914
- Country: Germany
- Languages: Silent; German intertitles

The Firm Gets Married (German: Die Firma heiratet) is a 1914 German silent comedy film directed by Carl Wilhelm and starring Ernst Lubitsch, Victor Arnold and Albert Paulig. It is also known by the alternative title of The Perfect Thirty-Six. It was remade by Wilhelm as a sound film The Firm Gets Married in 1931.

== Cast ==
- Victor Arnold as Hoflieferant Manfred Mayer
- Ernst Lubitsch as Moritz Abramowski
- Albert Paulig as Reisender Siegmund Philippsohn
- Ressel Orla as Trude Hoppe
- Hanns Kräly as Verkäufer
- Alfred Kuehne
- Anna Müller-Lincke as Tante Clara
- Franz Schönemann as Konfektionär Werdenberg

== Bibliography ==
- Elsaesser, Thomas. Weimar Cinema and After: Germany's Historical Imaginary. Routledge, 2013.
