= The Firm Gets Married (1931 film) =

1931 film

- Directed by: Carl Wilhelm
- Written by: Jacques Burg; Walter Turszinsky; Max Glass
- Produced by: Max Glass; Curt Melnitz
- Starring: Ralph Arthur Roberts; Charlotte Ander; Oskar Karlweis
- Cinematography: Nicolas Farkas
- Music by: Ernst Steffan
- Production company: Max Glass Filmproduktion
- Distributed by: Terra Film
- Release date: 19 January 1931
- Running time: 78 minutes
- Country: Germany
- Language: German

The Firm Gets Married (German: Die Firma heiratet) is a 1931 German musical comedy film directed by Carl Wilhelm and starring Ralph Arthur Roberts, Charlotte Ander, and Oskar Karlweis. It is a remake of the 1914 silent comedy The Firm Gets Married starring Ernst Lubitsch.

The film's art direction was by Ernő Metzner.

== Cast ==
- Ralph Arthur Roberts as Rittmeister a.D. von Werth
- Charlotte Ander as Trude
- Oskar Karlweis as Solly Friedländer
- Ida Wüst as Fräulein Hulda
- Edith Schollwer as Lissy
- Theo Lingen as Reisender Philipps
- Ferry Sikla as Herr Goldzahn
- Julius Falkenstein as Buchhalter Stups
- Trude Hesterberg

== Bibliography ==
- Limbacher, James L. (1979). Haven't I seen you somewhere before?: Remakes, sequels, and series in motion pictures and television, 1896–1978. Ann Arbor: Pierian Press. ISBN 978-0-87650-107-8.
