= Emil Albes =

German actor

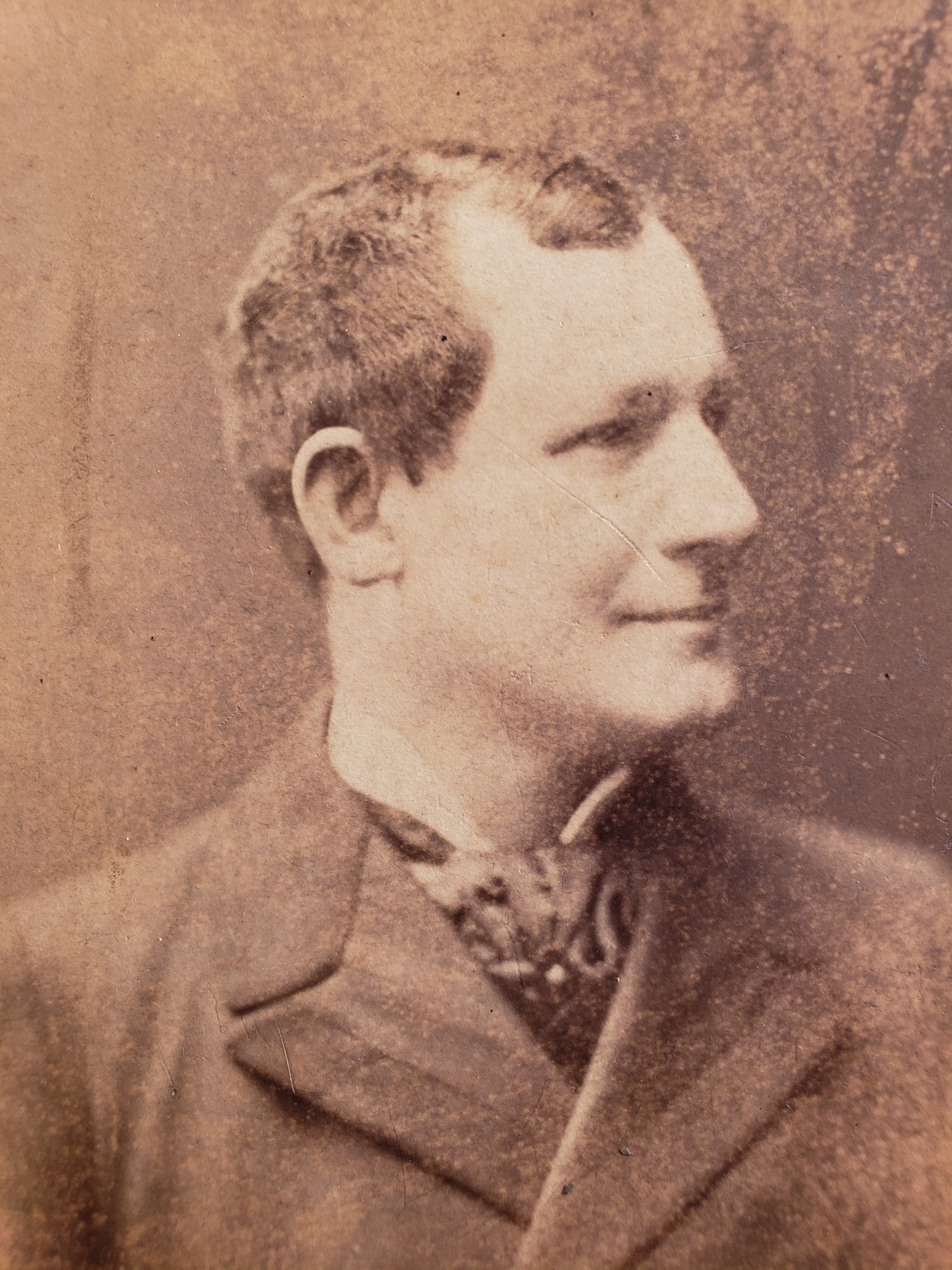
- Emil Albes
- Born: Friedrich Emil Albes; 30 October 1861; Bad Pyrmont, Principality of Waldeck and Pyrmont
- Died: 22 March 1923 (aged 61); Berlin, Germany
- Occupations: Actor, Director
- Years active: 1911–1923 (film)

Friedrich Emil Albes (30 October 1861 – 22 March 1923) was a German actor and film director of the silent era.

== Selected filmography ==
- The Traitress (1911)
- Poor Jenny (1912)
- The Dance of Death (1912)
- Veritas Vincit (1919)
- Parisian Women (1921)
- The Woman in the Trunk (1921)
- Bigamy (1922)
- Black Monday (1922)
- Tingeltangel (1922)
- She and the Three (1922)
- The Sun of St. Moritz (1923)
- Dudu, a Human Destiny (1924)

== Bibliography ==
- Rolf Giesen. The Nosferatu Story: The Seminal Horror Film, Its Predecessors and Its Enduring Legacy. McFarland, 2019.
