= The Black Count (film) =

1920 film

- Directed by: Otz Tollen
- Written by: Otz Tollen
- Produced by: John Hagenbeck
- Starring: Olga Engl; Alfred Abel; Rudolf Klein-Rogge
- Cinematography: Eugen Hamm
- Production company: Rhea-Film
- Distributed by: John Hagenbeck-Film
- Release date: 10 December 1920
- Running time: 60 minutes
- Country: Germany
- Languages: Silent; German intertitles

The Black Count (German: Der schwarze Graf) is a 1920 German silent film directed by Otz Tollen and starring Olga Engl, Alfred Abel, and Rudolf Klein-Rogge.

The film's sets were designed by the art director Franz Schroedter.

== Cast ==
- Olga Engl
- Alfred Abel
- Rudolf Klein-Rogge
- Hermann Vallentin
- Frida Richard
- Gustav Adolf Semler
- Maria Merlott
- Lya Sellin
- Maria Voigtsberge
- Kurt Middendorf

== Bibliography ==
- Bock, Hans-Michael; Bergfelder, Tim, eds. (2009). The Concise Cinegraph: Encyclopaedia of German Cinema. New York: Berghahn Books. ISBN 978-1-57181-655-9.
