= The Abyss (1910 film) =

1910 film directed by Urban Gad

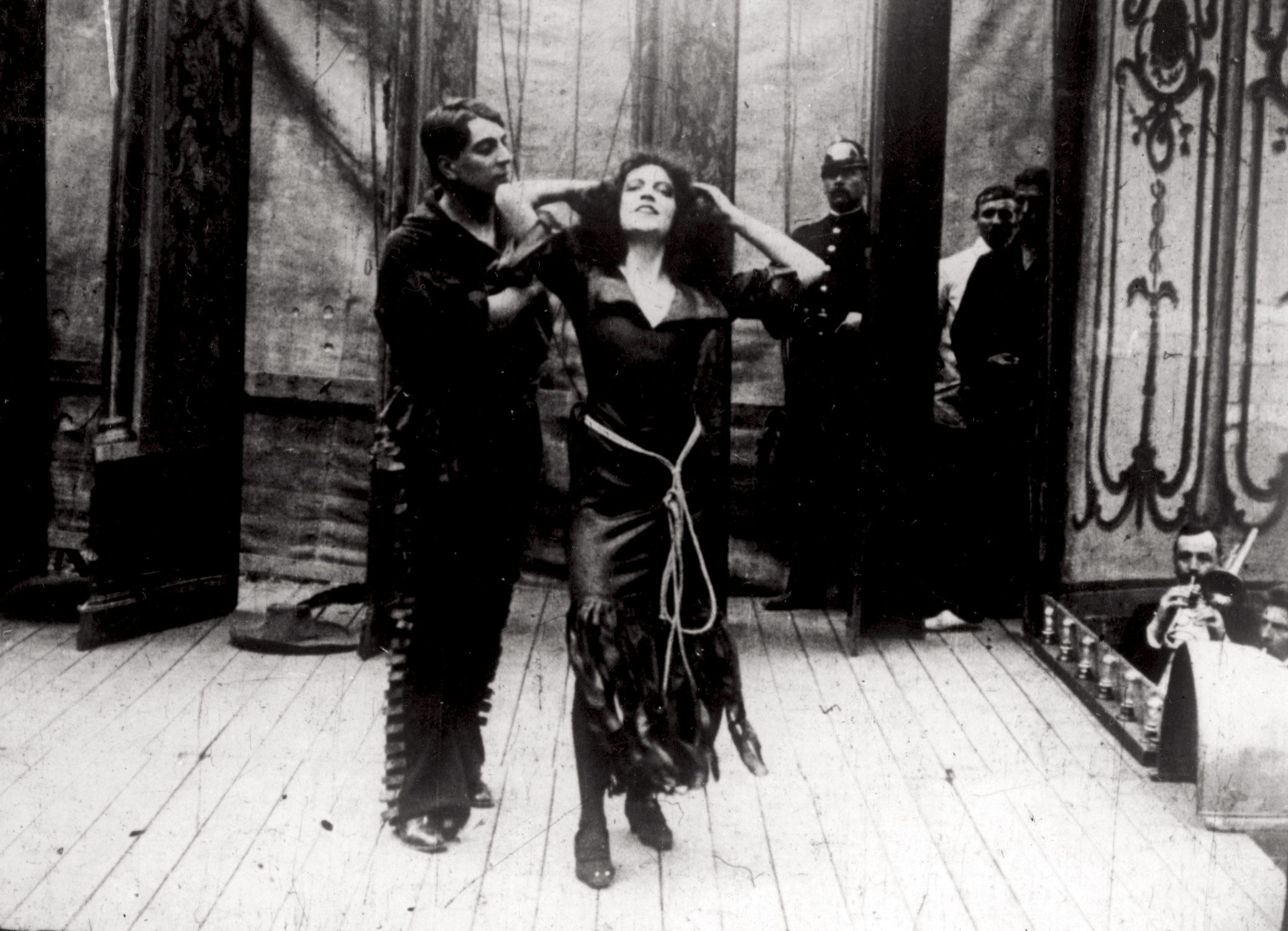
- "Gaucho dance" scene
- Directed by: Urban Gad
- Written by: Urban Gad
- Produced by: Hjalmar Davidsen
- Starring: Asta Nielsen; Robert Dinesen
- Cinematography: Alfred Lind
- Production company: Kosmorama
- Distributed by: Kosmorama
- Release date: 12 September 1910 (Denmark)
- Running time: 38 minutes
- Country: Denmark
- Language: Silent

The Abyss (Danish: Afgrunden), also known as Woman Always Pays, is a 1910 Danish silent black-and-white drama film, written and directed by Urban Gad. The lead performance and natural acting by Asta Nielsen led to her international stardom. Because of the overt eroticism of Nielsen's performance, the film was censored in Norway and Sweden.

== Plot ==
Knud, a vicar's son, meets Magda, a piano teacher, on a tram. He falls in love with her and introduces her to his parents. She refuses to go with them to the Sunday service and convinces him to go to the circus with her. She dances with the performers and at night and one of them, Rudolf, comes to seduce her. They run away on horseback. Magda is not happy with Rudolf, who keeps flirting with other girls, but she cannot leave him, despite Knud's efforts.

== Cast ==
Asta Nielsen and Poul Reumert

Full Movie

- Asta Nielsen as Magda Vang
- Robert Dinesen as Knud Svane, Magda's fiancé
- Poul Reumert as Rudolf Stern, circus performer
- Hans Neergaard as Peder Svane, vicar
- Hulda Didrichsen as the Vicar's wife
- Emilie Sannom as Lilly d'Estrelle, singer
- Oscar Stribolt as Waiter
- Arne Weel as garden guest
- Johannes Fønss as garden guest
- Torben Meyer
