= Asta Nielsen =

Danish silent film actress (1881–1972)

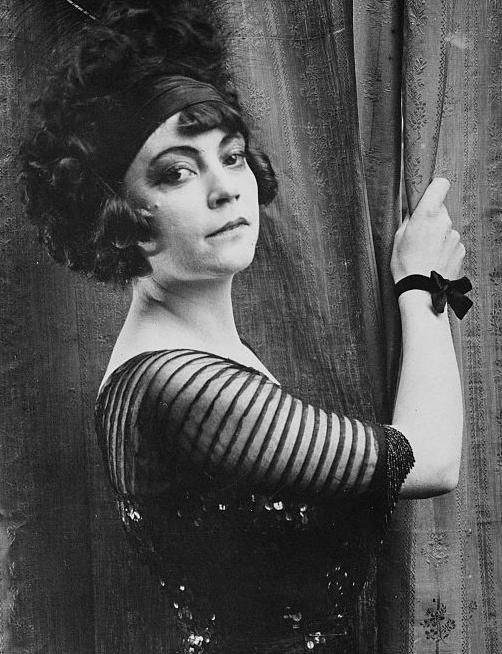
- Asta Nielsen in 1911
- Born: Asta Sofie Amalie Nielsen; 11 September 1881; Vesterbro, Denmark
- Died: 24 May 1972 (aged 90); Frederiksberg, Denmark
- Burial place: Vestre Cemetery, Copenhagen, Denmark
- Education: Royal Danish Theatre
- Occupations: Actress, artist, author
- Years active: 1902 — 1936
- Spouses: Urban Gad (m. 1912; div. 1918); Ferdinand Wingårdh (m. 1919; div. 1923); Anders Christian Theede (m. 1970)
- Partner: Gregori Chmara (1923–1936)
- Children: 1

Asta Sofie Amalie Nielsen (11 September 1881 – 24 May 1972) was a Danish silent film actress who was one of the most popular leading ladies of the 1910s and one of the first international movie stars. Seventy of Nielsen's 74 films were made in Germany where she was known simply as Die Asta (The Asta).

Known for her large dark eyes, mask-like face and boyish figure, Nielsen most often portrayed strong-willed passionate women trapped by tragic circumstances. Due to the erotic nature of her performances, Nielsen's films were censored in the United States, and her work remained relatively obscure to American audiences. She is credited with transforming movie acting from overt theatricality to a more subtle naturalistic style.

Nielsen founded her own film studio in Berlin during the 1920s, but returned to Denmark in 1937 after the rise of Nazism in Germany. A private figure in her later years, Nielsen became a collage artist and an author.

== Early life ==
Asta Sofie Amalie Nielsen was born in the Vesterbro district of Copenhagen, Denmark, the daughter of Jens Christian Nielsen (1847–1895), an often unemployed blacksmith, and Ida Frederikke Petersen (1843–1912), a washerwoman. She had an older sister, Johanne, who suffered from rheumatic fever throughout her life. Nielsen's family moved several times during her childhood while her father sought employment. They lived for several years in Malmö, Sweden, where her father worked at a corn mill and then a factory. After he lost those jobs, they returned to live in the Copenhagen neighborhood of Nørrebro. Nielsen's father died when she was fourteen years old.

At the age of 18, Nielsen was accepted into the acting school of the Royal Danish Theatre. During her time there, she studied closely with Royal Danish Actor Peter Jerndorff. In 1901, 21-year-old Nielsen became pregnant and gave birth to a daughter, Jesta. Nielsen never revealed the father's identity, but chose to raise her child alone with the help of her mother and older sister. Jesta committed suicide in 1964.

Nielsen graduated from the Theater school in 1902. For the next three years she worked at the Dagmar Theatre, then toured in Norway and Sweden from 1905 to 1907 with De Otte and the Peter Fjelstrup companies. Returning to Denmark, she was employed at Det Ny Theater from 1907 to 1910. Although she worked steadily as a stage actress, her performances remained unremarkable. Danish historian Robert Neiiendam wrote that Nielsen's unique physical attraction, which was of great value on the screen, was limited on stage by her deep and uneven speaking voice.

== Film career ==
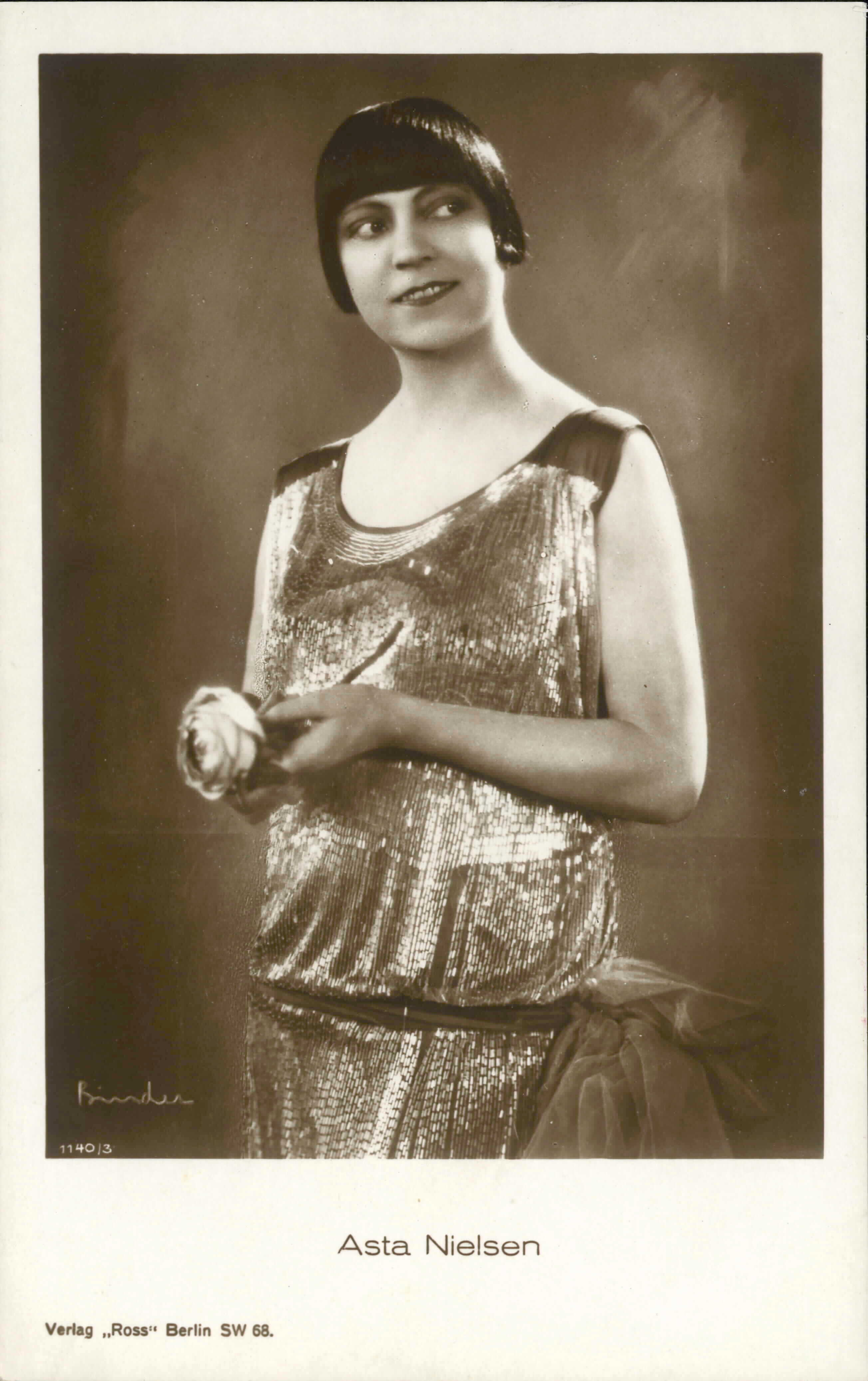
Asta Nielsen photographed by Alexander Binder, 1920s.

Nielsen began her film career in 1909, starring in director Urban Gad's 1910 tragedy Afgrunden ("The Abyss"). Nielsen's minimalist acting style was evidenced in her successful portrayal of a naive young woman lured into a tragic life. Her overt sexuality in the film's "gaucho dance" scene established the erotic quality for which Nielsen became known. Because of the film's success, Nielsen continued to act in cinema rather than on stage. Nielsen and Gad married, then made four more films together. The explosion of Nielsen's popularity propelled Gad and Nielsen to move from Denmark to Germany where she was provided her own film studio and the opportunity for greater profits.

In Germany, Nielsen formed a contract with German producer Paul Davidson, who founded the Internationale Film-Vertriebs-Gesellschaft in conjunction with Nielsen and Gad. The company held the European rights on all Nielsen films and Nielsen became a "scintillating international film star", known simply as Die Asta (The Asta), with an annual fee of 85,000 marks in 1914 alone.

Davidson described Nielsen as the decisive factor for his move to film productions:

I had not been thinking about film production. But then I saw the first Asta Nielsen film. I realised that the age of short film was past. And above all I realised that this woman was the first artist in the medium of film. Asta Nielsen, I instantly felt could be a global success. It was international film sales that provided Union with eight Nielsen films per year. I built her a studio in Tempelhof, and set up a big production staff around her. This woman can carry it ... Let the films cost whatever they cost. I used every available means – and devised many new ones – in order to bring the Asta Nielsen films to the world.

Nielsen contracted for the equivalent of $80,000 a year, then the highest salary for a film star. Nielsen has been called the first international movie star, challenged only by French comic Max Linder, also famous throughout Europe and in America by that time. In a Russian popularity poll of 1911, Nielsen was voted the world's top female movie star, behind Linder and ahead of her Danish compatriot Valdemar Psilander. Her film 'A Militant Suffragette' was disrupted at a showing in the Queen's Cinema, Aberdeen, Scotland on 4 February 1914, by local suffragists objecting to the portrayal of force-feeding. However, she remained popular on both sides through World War I and in 1915 (before the United States' entry into it) she visited New York City to study American film techniques. She departed Germany after a mob on the Unter den Linden mistook her for a Russian at the beginning of the war.

In 1921, Nielsen, through her own film distribution company of Asta Films, appeared in the Svend Gade and Heinz Schall directed Hamlet. The film was a radical interpretation of William Shakespeare's play, with Nielsen playing the role of Hamlet as a woman who disguises herself as a man.

Several sources, including IMDb, state that Nielsen played Mata Hari in an early-1920s film variously titled Mata Hari, Die Spionin ('The Spy'). However, scholarly works such as the authoritative filmography published by Filmarchiv Austria in 2010 make no mention of such a film. Film scholar Ivo Blom has concluded that the idea of Nielsen playing Mata Hari on film arose from a confusion with her now-lost film Die Tänzerin Navarro (1922), which features a plot similar to the story of Mata Hari's life.

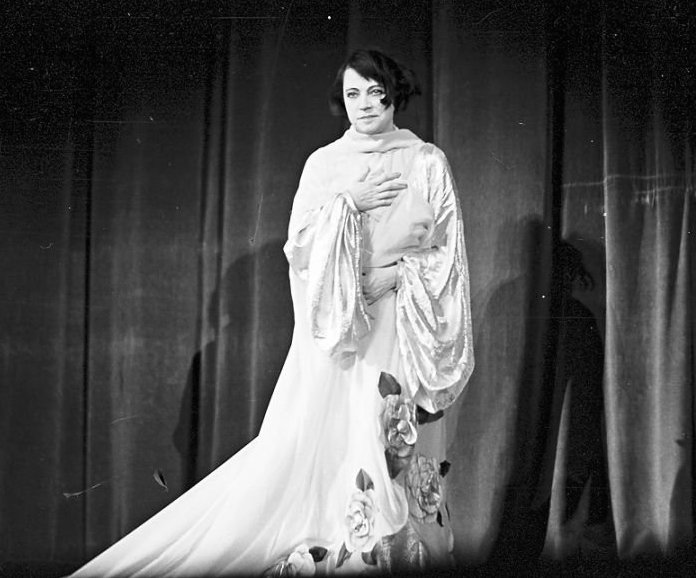
Asta Nielsen at an appearance at Scala Theater in Berlin, 1934

In 1925, Nielsen starred in the German film Die freudlose Gasse (The Joyless Street or The Street of Sorrow), directed by G.W. Pabst and co-starring Greta Garbo, months before Garbo left for Hollywood and MGM.

Nielsen worked in German films until the start of sound movies. Nielsen made only one feature movie with sound, Unmögliche Liebe (Crown of Thorns) in 1932. However, the new technical developments in cinema were not suitable to Nielsen's style, nor could her maturity compete with the young American ingenues, so she retired from the screen. Thereafter, Nielsen acted only on stage. After the rise of Nazism she was offered her own studio by propaganda minister Joseph Goebbels. Nielsen later described being invited to tea with Adolf Hitler, who tried to convince her to return to film and explained the political power of her on-screen presence. Understanding the implications, Nielsen declined and left Germany in 1936. She returned home to Denmark where she wrote articles on art and politics and a two-volume autobiography.

== Assistance to Jews during World War II ==
During the Second World War, she provided money for Allan O. Hagedorff, a young Dane living in Germany, to assist Jews. Using money provided by Nielsen, Hagedorff sent so many food parcels to the Theresienstadt Ghetto that he was warned by the Gestapo. Among others, Victor Klemperer, the diarist and philologist, was offered money by Hagedorff.

== Relationships and death ==
Nielsen had four extended relationships and was divorced twice. In 1912, she married the Danish film director Urban Gad following their move together to Germany in 1911 to build their own film studio. They were divorced by 1919 when Nielsen married the Swedish shipbuilder Freddy Windgårdh. This marriage was shorter, ending in divorce in 1923. Nielsen fell in love with the Ukrainian actor Gregori Chmara whom she met through their mutual friend Georg Brandes. They began a long-term common-law marriage that lasted from 1923 until 1936. Nielsen began a relationship in the late 1960s with Danish art collector Christian Theede, whom she had met through dealings of her own artwork. In 1970, at the age of 88, Nielsen married the 70-year-old Theede. Nielsen and Theede's happiness at marrying at an advanced age was celebrated in the world press. Nielsen died at the age of 90 on 25 May 1972 at Frederiksberg Hospital.

== Quotes about Asta Nielsen ==
"Asta Nielsen" means the power to speak of pathos, to see pain, and to find the middle path between Baudelaire's flower of evil and the sick rose of which Blake sang.

— M.S. Fonseca, The International Dictionary of Films And Filmmakers: Actors and Actresses

There is a film in which Asta Nielsen is looking out of the window and sees someone coming. A mortal fear, a petrified horror, appears on her face. But she gradually realizes that she is mistaken and that the man who is approaching, far from spelling disaster, is the answer to her prayers. The expression of horror on her face is gradually modulated through the entire scale of feelings from hesitant doubt, anxious hope and cautious joy, right through to exultant happiness. We watch her face in closeup for some twenty metres of film. We see every hint of expression around her eyes and mouth and watch them relax one by one and slowly change. For minutes on end we witness the organic development of her feelings, and nothing beyond.

— Béla Balázs, Visible Man, or the Culture of Film (1924)

In terms of expression and versatility, I am nothing to her.

— Greta Garbo

== Legacy ==
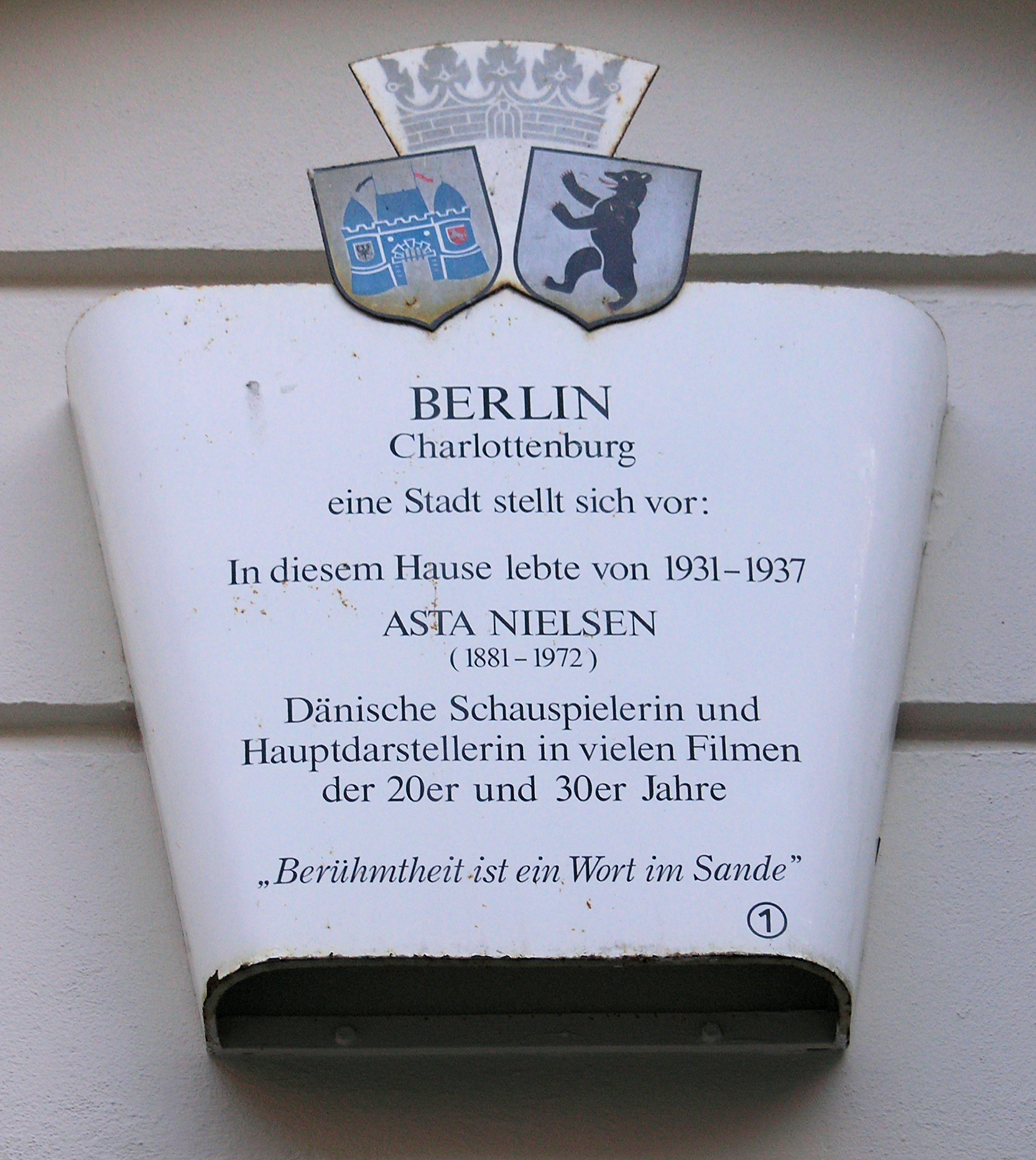
Memorial plaque for Asta Nielsen at Fasanenstraße 69, in Charlottenburg

Belgian Paul van Ostaijen included the expressionistic poem "Asta Nielsen", a paean to Nielsen's sensuousness, in his 1921 collection Bezette Stad (Occupied City).

Joachim Ringelnatz, who was a frequent guest at Nielsens' home, wrote the poems "Über Asta Nielsen" (About Asta Nielsen) for his 1928 collection Reisebriefe eines Artisten (An Artist's Travel Letters) - and "Asta Nielsen weiht einen Pokal" (Asta Nielsen Dedicates a Trophy) in 1929.

== Filmography ==
Year	Film	Role	Notes
1910	The Abyss	Magda Vang	
1911	Gipsy Blood	Jonna	Lost film
1911	The Moth	Olga / Mademoiselle Yvonne	Lost film
1911	Den sorte drøm	Stella	
1911	Im großen Augenblick	Annie	
1911	Balletdanserinden	Camille Flavier	
1911	Der fremde Vogel	Miss May	
1911	The Traitress	Yvonne	Fragments preserved
1912	Die Macht des Goldes	Creszenz Fitzinger	Lost film
1912	Zu Tode gehetzt	Paula Müller	Lost film
1912	Poor Jenny	Jenny	
1912	The Dance of Death	Bella	Fragments preserved
1912	Die Kinder des Generals	Thekla	Lost film
1912	Wenn die Maske fällt	Sanna	Fragments preserved
1912	Das Mädchen ohne Vaterland	Zidra	Fragments preserved
1912	Jugend und Tollheit	Jesta Müller	Lost film
1913	Komödianten	Kamma Dieser	Lost film
1913	Die Sünden der Väter	Hanna Meyer	
1913	Der Tod in Sevilla	Juanita	Lost film
1913	Die Suffragette	Nelly Panburne	Fragments preserved
1913	S1 (1913)	Gertrud von Hessendorf	
1913	The Film Primadonna	Ruth Breton	Fragments preserved
1914	Little Angel	Jesta Schneider	
1914	Das Kind ruft	Elena	Lost film
1914	Zapata's Gang		
1914	Das Feuer	Wanda Petri	Lost film
1915	Die Tochter der Landstraße	Zirzi	Lost film
1915	The False Asta Nielsen	Bolette / Asta Nielsen	Lost film
1916	Die ewige Nacht	Martha	Lost film
1916	Engeleins Hochzeit	Jesta Schneider	Lost film
1916	Frontstairs and Backstairs	Sabine Schulze	
1916	Dora Brandes	Dora Brandes	
1916	The ABC of Love	Lis	
1916	Cinderella	Lotte	Lost film
1916	Das Versuchskaninchen	Jesta	
1917	The White Roses	Thilda Wardier	
1917	Das Waisenhauskind	Esther	Lost film
1918	Im Lebenswirbel	Margit	
1918	Rose of the Wilderness	Wanda	Lost film
1918	The Eskimo Baby	Ivigtut	
1918	The Queen of the Stock Exchange	Helene Netzler	
1919	So Ends My Song	Dora	
1919	Intoxication	Henriette	Fragments preserved
1919	Towards the Light	Countess Ysabel	
1919	According to Law	Sonja Waler	
1920	The Merry-Go-Round	Elena	
1920	Helmsman Holk	Isabella Bouflon	Fragments preserved
1920	Kurfürstendamm	Lissy / Marie	Lost film
1921	Hamlet: The Drama of Vengeance	Hamlet	
1921	Roswolsky's Mistress	Mary Verhag	
1921	Wandering Souls	Nastassja Baraschkowa	
1922	Miss Julie	Miss Julie	Lost film
1922	Brigantenrache	Anica, a Bandit's Bride	Lost film
1922	Vanina	Vanina	
1922	Navarro the Dancer	Carmencita Navarro	Lost film
1923	Earth Spirit	Lulu	
1923	Downfall	Kaja Falk	Fragments preserved
1923	I.N.R.I.	Maria Magdalene	Fragments preserved
1924	The House by the Sea	Teresa	
1924	The Woman in Flames	Josefine	Lost film
1924	Athletes	Princess Wanda Hoheneck	Lost film
1924	Die Schmetterlingsschlacht	Rosi Hergentheim	Fragments preserved
1925	Hedda Gabler	Hedda Gabler	Lost film
1925	Living Buddhas	Tibetan girl	Fragments preserved
1925	Joyless Street	Marie Lechner	
1926	The Fallen	Anna Grosser	Lost film
1927	The Vice of Humanity	Tamara	
1927	Tragedy of the Street	Auguste	
1927	Agitated Women	Clarina	Lost film
1927	Small Town Sinners	Selma Karchow	Fragments preserved
1927	That Dangerous Age	Elsie Lindtner	
1932	Impossible Love	Vera Holgk	
