= Urban Gad =

Danish film director (1879–1947)

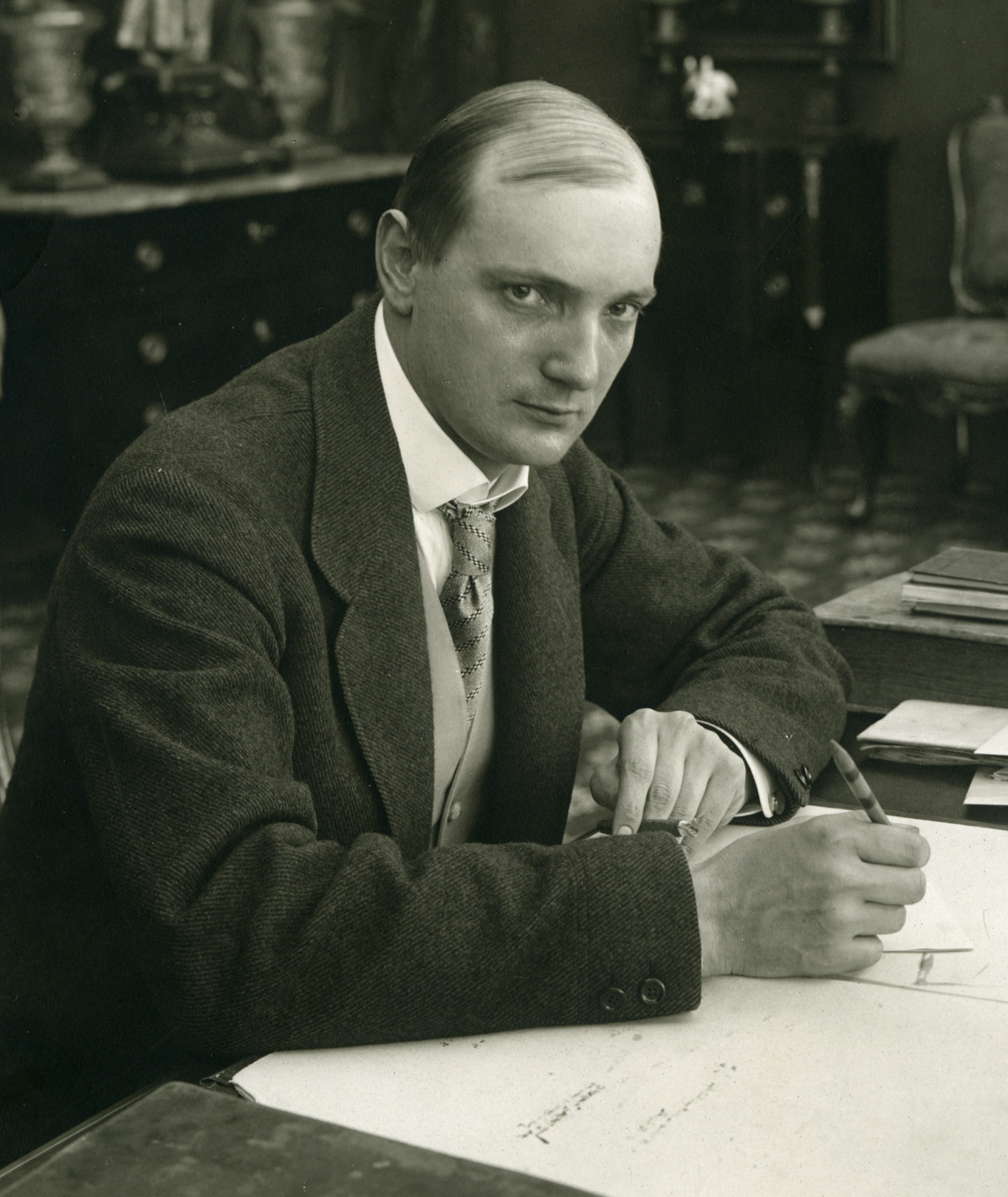
- Born: 12 February 1879; Korsør, Denmark
- Died: 26 December 1947 (aged 68); Copenhagen, Denmark
- Occupations: Film director, actor, screenwriter, author
- Years active: 1900–1947
- Spouses: Asta Nielsen (m. 1912; div. 1918) Esther Burgert Westenhagen (m. 1922–1947)
- Parent(s): Urban Gad (father); Emma Gad (mother)

Peter Urban Bruun Gad (12 February 1879 – 26 December 1947) was a Danish film director, screenwriter and author. He directed the film Afgrunden (1910), which gave the actress Asta Nielsen her breakthrough. He became her regular director and later her husband. From 1911 to 1922 he worked mainly in Germany, where he directed dozens of silent films. He then returned to Copenhagen and managed the cinema Grand Teatret until his death. His book Filmen, dens Midler og Maal (1919) was the first major work of film theory published in Denmark.

== Early life and education ==
Gad was born in Korsør. His father, Nicolaus Urban Gad (1841–1920), was a naval officer who rose to the rank of rear admiral. His mother was the writer and playwright Emma Gad (1852–1921). After leaving school in 1898 he set out to become a painter. He studied at the Royal Danish Academy of Fine Arts and continued his training in Paris with his uncle, the painter Frits Thaulow.

== Career ==
=== Stage career ===
Gad turned to the theatre instead of painting. He was stage director at the Dagmar Theatre in Copenhagen in the 1909–10 season and then moved to Det Ny Teater. There he worked as an artistic adviser and set designer, and he met the actress Asta Nielsen.

=== Film career ===
==== Afgrunden and Asta Nielsen ====
In 1910 Gad was assistant director on En rekrut fra 64, directed by Alfred Lind. the same year he directed his first film, Afgrunden, from his own screenplay, with Nielsen in the lead. The film was one of the earliest multi-reel dramas and became an unexpected international success.

In 1911 the Deutsche Bioscop company hired Gad and Nielsen for two films, including Nachtfalter. They then returned to Denmark to make Den sorte drøm for the company Fotorama in Aarhus. Nordisk Film offered them a contract, but a German group formed by Deutsche Bioscop, Projektions-AG Union (PAGU) and a Strasbourg distributor signed them to a multi-year agreement instead. A new company, the Internationale Film-Vertriebs-Gesellschaft, was set up to distribute the Gad–Nielsen series.

=== Germany (1911–1922) ===
Gad and Nielsen married in 1912, and Gad became head of the company's "Asta Nielsen department". he directed Nielsen in 24 films for PAGU, which was run by the producer Paul Davidson. They included Der fremde Vogel (1911), Die arme Jenny (1912), Die Filmprimadonna (1913), Engelein (1914) and Vordertreppe und Hintertreppe (1915). Several of these films set their heroines in bohemian or artistic circles, while others, such as Zigeunerblut and Vordertreppe und Hintertreppe, were set among the working class.

== Personal life and death ==
Gad married Asta Nielsen on 11 May 1912 in Copenhagen; the marriage was dissolved in 1918. In 1922 he married the German actress Esther Margaretha Burgert Westenhagen (1896–1974), who acted as Esther Hagen. Gad died in Copenhagen on 26 December 1947 and was buried in Humlebæk.

== Writing ==
In 1919 Gad published Filmen, dens Midler og Maal (Film: Its Means and Aims), in which he set out his practical experience as a director. It was the first major Danish work of film theory, and one of the earliest books on the craft written by a working director. A German translation, Der Film – seine Mittel – seine Ziele, appeared in 1921.

== Filmography ==
- En rekrut fra 64
- The Abyss (Afgrunden) (1910)
- Gipsy Blood (1911)
- The Moth (Nachtfalter) (1911)
- Den sorte drøm (1911)
- Im großen Augenblick (1911)
- Zigeunerblut (1911)
- Der fremde Vogel (1911)
- Dyrekøbt glimmer
- The Traitress (Die Verräterin) (1911)
- Den store flyver
- Die Macht des Goldes (1912)
- Poor Jenny (Die arme Jenny) (1912)
- Zu Tode gehetzt (1912)
- Der Totentanz (1912)
- Die Kinder des Generals (1912)
- Wenn die Maske fällt (1912)
- Det berygtede Hus
- A Romany Spy (Das Mädchen ohne Vaterland) (1912)
- Behind Comedy's Mask (Komödianten) (1913)
- Jugend und Tollheit (1913)
- Die Sünden der Väter (1913)
- Der Tod in Sevilla (1913)
- Die Suffragette (1913)
- S 1 (1913)
- The Film Primadonna (Die Filmprimadonna) (1913)
- Engelein - Mimisches Lustspiel (1913)
- Emma og Urban Gad i hjemmet (1913)
- Engelein (1914)
- Das Kind ruft (1914)
- Zapata's Gang (Zapatas Bande) (1914)
- Das Feuer (1914)
- Standrechtlich erschossen (1914)
- Das Feuer. Die alte Gnädige (1914)
- Vordertreppe - Hintertreppe (1915)
- Die Tochter der Landstraße (1915)
- Die falsche Asta Nielsen (1915)
- Die ewige Nacht (1915)
- Engeleins Hochzeit (1916)
- Die weißen Rosen (1916)
- Cinderella (Aschenbrödel) (1916)
- Der rote Streifen (1916)
- Der breite Weg (1917)
- Die verschlossene Tür (1917)
- Klosterfriede (1917)
- Die Vergangenheit rächt sich (1917)
- Die Gespensterstunde (1917)
- Vera Panina (1918)
- Die neue Daliah (1918)
- Die Kleptomanin (1918)
- Der schuldlose Verdacht (1918)
- Der Schmuck des Rajah (1918)
- Das verhängnisvolle Andenken (1918)
- Das sterbende Modell (1918)
- Das Spiel von Liebe und Tod (1919)
- Christian Wahnschaffe (1920)
- What a Girl (1920)
- Der Abgrund der Seelen (1920)
- Ich bin Du (1921)
- Mein Mann - Der Nachtredakteur (1921)
- The Love Corridor (1921)
- The Poisoned Stream (1921)
- The Island of the Lost (1921)
- Hannele's Journey to Heaven (1922)
- Graf Festenberg (1922)
- Lykkehjulet (1926)
