= Fred Immler =

German actor (1880–1965)

Ferdinand "Fred" Immler (10 December 1880 –20 February 1965) was a German stage and film actor.

== Life ==
Born in Coburg, as a young adult he worked from 1900 to 1902 at Deutsche Bank in Berlin and from 1902 to 1904 at Dresdner Bank. 1905 he returned to Coburg as an actor-in-training and from 1906 to 1908 he performed at the local court theatre. From 1908 to 1909, he worked at the Residence Theater Hanover, 1909 at the Summer Theatre in Posen and from 1909 to 1910 at the court theatre in Gera. 1910, he played at the Liebich Theatre and at the Victoria Theatre in Breslau.

In 1912, Immler made the transition to the medium of motion pictures and appeared opposite the Danish actress Asta Nielsen in several roles between 1912 and 1915, all directed by Nielsen's husband Urban Gad. At the outbreak of World War I, he enlisted in the German military. He returned to film in 1919, and starred in the Ernst Lubitsch-directed, Hanns Kräly-penned costume-drama Madame Dubarry opposite Pola Negri and Emil Jannings. One of his best recalled films of the early 1920s was in the 1921 Ernst Lubitsch-directed drama Vendetta, once more opposite Pola Negri. In 1929 he appeared with Marlene Dietrich and Fritz Kortner in the Maurice Tourneur-directed film adaption of the Franzos Keremen novel Das Schiff der verlorenen Menschen (The Ship of Lost Men).

Fred Immler retired from acting in 1935 and worked primarily as a dispatcher for a production company until the end of World War II. His last film appearance was in the 1935 film Der blaue Diamant (English: The Blue Diamond). After the war he retired to his hometown of Coburg. He died in 1965 at age 84.

== Selected filmography ==
- The False Asta Nielsen (1915)
- Jan Vermeulen, the Miller of Flanders (1917)
- Vendetta (1919)
- From the Files of a Respectable Woman (1920)
- Mascotte (1920)
- The Devil Worshippers (1921)
- Raid (1921)
- The Beautiful Girl (1923)
- The Fake Emir (1924)
- The Third Watch (1924)
- Dangerous Clues (1924)
- Mister Radio (1924)
- A Dangerous Game (1924)
- The Eleven Schill Officers (1926)
- The Ship of Lost Souls (1929)
- Lux, King of Criminals (1929)
- Waterloo (1929)
- Distinguishing Features (1929)
- The Big Bluff (1933)
- Dream of the Rhine (1933)
- There Is Only One Love (1933)
