= The Women House of Brescia =

1920 film directed by Hubert Moest

- Theatrical release poster
- Das Frauenhaus von Brescia
- Directed by: Hubert Moest
- Written by: Hubert Moest; Karl Hans Strobl
- Based on: Das Frauenhaus von Brescia by Karl Hans Strobl
- Produced by: Hubert Moest
- Starring: Fritz Delius (actor); Ernst Deutsch; Maria Forescu; Fritz Jessner; Joseph Klein; Hedda Vernon; Olga Limburg; Josef Peterhans; Julius Roether; Eduard von Winterstein; Gertrude Welcker; Toni Zimmerer
- Cinematography: Georg Schubert
- Distributed by: Moest-Film GmbH & Co.
- Release date: 1920 (Germany)
- Country: Germany
- Languages: Silent; German intertitles

The Women House of Brescia (German: Das Frauenhaus von Brescia) is a 1920 German-language silent film directed by Hubert Moest. The film's alternative name was The House of Pillory. The film was considered highly controversial for the depiction of prostitution. The film's story was set in medieval Europe during the fourteenth century. The film was based on Karl Hans Strobl's novel Das Frauenhaus von Brescia. The Pillory houses were the places where enemy women captured during wartime were imprisoned so that the people could exploit them as they wished. The depiction of prostitution was the basis for the picture's rejection by the British Board of Film Classification in 1921 and its being banned in Germany.

== Plot ==
In 1311 the coronation of King Henry of the Lombards takes place. After becoming the king he wages war against Italy and Brescia (ruled by Francesco de Barbiano). While campaigning, he sends for his queen, Margaret (Gertrude Welcker), who along with her ladies-in-waiting is captured and imprisoned by Barbiano. Barbiano orders the women to be sent to the House of Pillory. One of her maids, Roswitha (Hedda Vernon), impersonates the queen and asks him to leave the other women safe and capture only her. As a result, she is brought to the house of pillory where people hold a mock coronation with a crown of straw to humiliate her. She is forced into prostitution.

Two captured men, Gottwald (the queen's escort) and Herbolo (Roswitha's fiancé), flee from the house and inform Henry of the event. He is agitated after hearing all the information and vows to attack Brescia in vengeance. Meanwhile, in Brescia, Roswitha quickly gains popularity among the menfolk for her beauty and this makes their wives grow jealous of her. The women demand that Roswitha be handed over to them. They attack the pillory. Luigi, the local hangman, is killed during the struggle and Roswitha is led to the public stocks. Before anything happens to her, a nobleman, Alessandro, who knows her true identity and is in love with her, comes to rescue her.

Henry attacks the city and Alessandro is slain by Herbolo. When the local women come to know of her true identity they ask for Roswitha's forgiveness. In the end Roswitha and Herbolo's marriage takes place and the queen along with the other captives is freed and taken to the palace.

== Cast ==
- Gertrude Welcker as Queen Margaret
- Ernst Deutsch as Luigi
- Eduard von Winterstein as Francesco
- Hedda Vernon as Roswitha
- Olga Limburg as Barbara
- Josef Peterhans
- Julius Roether
- Toni Zimmerer
- Maria Forescu
- Fritz Jessner
- Joseph Klein
- Fritz Delius
- Gerda Frey as Adelheid
- Blandine Ebinger
- Paul Bildt

== Rejection ==
In 1921 the film was submitted to the British Board of Film Classification for approval. The censor was very strict regarding the depiction of prostitution in films. Many films had been denied certification on grounds of depiction of prostitution. This was the first time that the Board had to consider a film in which a woman takes to prostitution in order to save other women. The board rejected the film on 23 March 1921 and the film's distributors- Elijah Day & Sons Ltd- accepted the decision and did not attempt to challenge it. The board specified in its 1921 report that depicting the loss of virginity for any purpose would be grounds for rejection. The film was never screened in Britain though the British Film Institute bought a print of the film in 1937.

== Ban in Germany ==
The film was first screened at Lessing Theater in Hamburg in August 1920 and in September in Berlin. On 27 July 1921 the film was banned by the Film Censor Board following a resolution. An appeal was made to the board which allowed the film's screening from 21 September 1921 only to have the Board ban it again on 5 August 1923 even though the film company had removed a large number of scenes to which the Board objected.
