= Marie von Bülow =

German actress

Marie Schanzer von Bülow (1857–1941) was an Austrian-German stage and film actress. In July 1882, she married the pianist and conductor Hans von Bülow.

== Selected filmography ==
- Vengeance Is Mine (1916)
- Wenn Frauen lieben und hassen (1917)
- Sein letzter Seitensprung (1918)
- Diary of a Lost Woman (1918)
- Eugen Onegin (1919)
- The Fairy of Saint Ménard (1919)
- Blonde Poison (1919)
- During My Apprenticeship (1919)
- The Boy in Blue (1919)
- Mazeppa, der Volksheld der Ukraine
- Monte Carlo (1921)
- Fridericus Rex (1922)
- Barmaid (1922)
- The Sun of St. Moritz (1923)
