= People and Masks =

- Menschen und Masken
- Directed by: Harry Piel
- Written by: Harry Piel
- Produced by: Jules Greenbaum
- Starring: Max Auzinger; Hubert Moest; Hedda Vernon; Ludwig Trautmann
- Cinematography: Alfons Hepke
- Production company: Vitascope
- Distributed by: Vitascope
- Release date: June 6, 1913 (Germany)
- Country: Germany
- Languages: Silent; German intertitles

People and Masks (German: Menschen und Masken) is a 1913 German silent film directed by Harry Piel and featuring Max Auzinger, Hubert Moest, Hedda Vernon, and Ludwig Trautmann in the lead roles. A sequel was also released in the same year, People and Masks Part 2.

== Cast ==
- Max Auzinger
- Hubert Moest
- Hedda Vernon
- Ludwig Trautmann
