= Volf Bronner =

Russian and Soviet physician (1876–1939)

Professor Volf Moiseevich Bronner
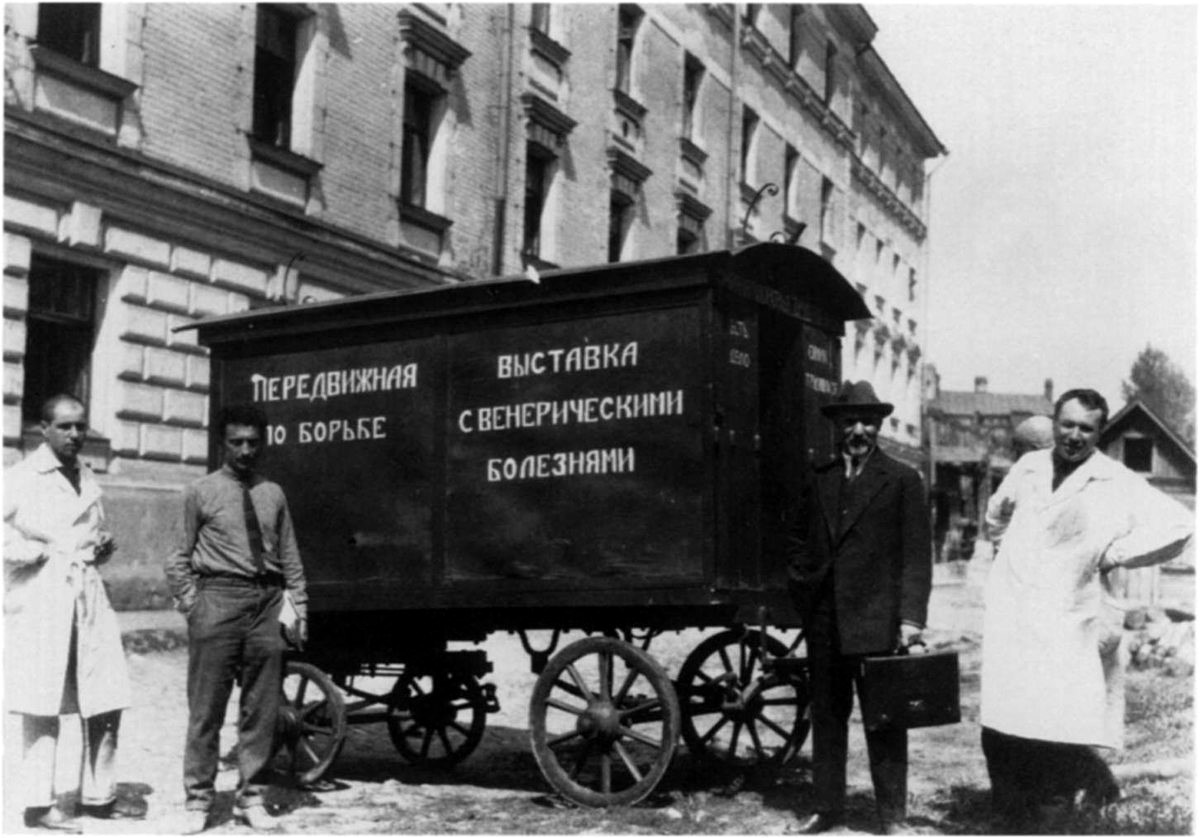
- Soviet anti-syphilis propaganda, Moscow, 1926. Image shows Dr Volf Bronner to the right of the wagon, outside the State Venereological Institute.
- Born: 1876; Buriat-Mongolia
- Died: 1939 (aged 62–63)
- Education: University of Berlin
- Known for: Founded State Venereology Institute, Moscow
- Medical career
- Profession: Physician
- Institutions: State Venereology Institute, Moscow
- Sub-specialties: Venereology

Volf (or Wolf) Moiseevich Bronner (Russian: Вольф Моисеевич Броннер; 1876–1939) was a Russian and Soviet physician, venereologist, and anti-syphilis campaigner who founded the State Venereological Institute in Moscow of which he became the director.

He was politically active in his youth, and expelled from his first university for it.

== Early life ==
Volf Bronner was born in Buriat-Mongolia in 1876. He attended high school in Chita and then began to study medicine at the University of Tomsk but was expelled because of his revolutionary political activities. One of his classmates at Tomsk was A. T. Trubacheev, later the People's Commissar of Public Health of the Buryat Autonomous Soviet Socialist Republic. He continued his medical studies at the University of Berlin from where he obtained his doctorate in medicine in 1900.

== Career ==
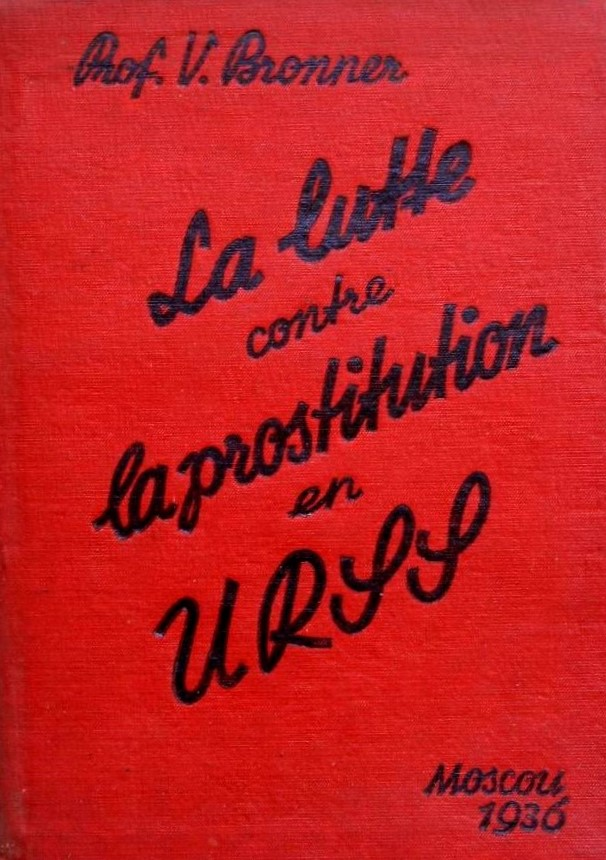
La lutte contre la prostitution en URSS. Moscow, 1936.

From 1900 to autumn 1901, Bronner was a doctor in Verkhneudinsk, and from 1906 to 1913 he was in Paris, where he worked with professor Guyon and subsequently at the Pasteur Institute. He edited the Journal Clinique d'Urologie. From 1915 he worked in Moscow and in 1922 he established the State Venereological Institute in Moscow, of which he became the director.

Bronner helped to organise the 1928 Soviet-German Syphilis Expedition which aimed to tackle the endemic syphilis in Buriat-Mongolia, Bronner's place of birth, and to determine the method of transmission of the disease. Contrary to expectations, the expedition concluded that the syphilis in the area was spread principally by sexual activity.

In 1927, Bronner edited Prostitutsiia v Rossii (Prostitution in Russia) with Arkadii Elistratov, professor of police law at Moscow University, and in 1936, his book, La lutte contre la prostitution en URSS (The fight against prostitution in the USSR) revealed that two thirds of prostitutes had been servants.

Following the Russian Communist Party's 17th Congress in 1934, which emphasised service to the collective over individual needs, Bronner was one of a number of public figures who changed his public utterances to match the new ethos, moving away from a humanistic approach that saw syphilitic infection as the result of misfortune and nothing to be ashamed about, towards an approach that characterised it as impeding the efforts of the party and something that carried shameful connotations.

== Selected publications ==
- Prostitutsiia v Rossii. (Prostitution in Russia) Moscow, 1927. (Joint editor with Arkadii Ivanovich Elistratov)
- "Itogi Tret’ego Vsesoyuznogo S’ezda po bor’be s venericheskimi boleznyami" (The Results of the Third All-Union Convention Against Venereal Diseases), Zdravookhranenie (Health Care), No. 7 (1929), pp. 12–13.
- "K tretiemu vsesoyuznomu s’ezdu po bor’be s venericheskimi boleznyami" (Toward the Third All-Union Convention Against Venereal Diseases), Zdravookhranenie, No. 5 (1929), p. 9.
- La lutte contre la prostitution en URSS. (The fight against prostitution in the USSR) (French) La Société pour les relations culturelles entre l’U.R.S.S. et l’étranger (VOKS), Moscow, 1936.

== See also ==
- Max Jessner
