= During My Apprenticeship =

1919 film directed by Hubert Moest

- Directed by: Hubert Moest
- Written by: Georg Engel; Hubert Moest
- Based on: From My Farming Days by Fritz Reuter
- Produced by: Hubert Moest
- Starring: Hedda Vernon; Reinhold Schünzel; Wilhelm Diegelmann
- Cinematography: Georg Schubert
- Production company: Moest-Film
- Release date: 25 October 1919
- Country: Germany
- Languages: Silent; German intertitles

During My Apprenticeship (German: Ut mine Stromtid) is a 1919 German silent drama film directed by Hubert Moest and starring Hedda Vernon, Reinhold Schünzel, and Wilhelm Diegelmann. It is based on the nineteenth century novel From My Farming Days by Fritz Reuter.

The film's sets were designed by the art director Hans Dreier.

== Cast ==
- Reinhold Schünzel as Axel von Rambow
- Hedda Vernon
- Wilhelm Diegelmann
- Eugen Rex
- Eduard von Winterstein
- Fritz Beckmann
- Hanne Brinkmann
- Fritz Delius
- Gerda Frey
- Vera Hall
- Kurt Middendorf
- Lotte Petermann
- Auguste Prasch-Grevenberg
- Marie von Buelow

== See also ==
- Uncle Bräsig (1936)

== Bibliography ==
- Bock, Hans-Michael; Bergfelder, Tim, eds. (2009). The Concise Cinegraph: Encyclopaedia of German Cinema. New York: Berghahn Books. ISBN 978-1-57181-655-9.
