= The Golden Plague =

The Golden Plague (German: Die goldene Pest) may refer to:

- The Golden Plague (1921 film), a German silent film directed by Richard Oswald
- The Golden Plague (1954 film), a West German film directed by John Brahm
