= People and Masks Part 2 =

- Directed by: Harry Piel
- Written by: Harry Piel
- Starring: Hedda Vernon; Ludwig Trautmann
- Cinematography: Alfons Hepke
- Production company: Vitascope
- Distributed by: Vitascope
- Release date: 10 October 1913 (Germany)
- Languages: Silent; German intertitles

People and Masks Part 2 (German: Menschen und Masken – 2. Teil) is a 1913 German silent film directed by Harry Piel and featuring Hedda Vernon and Ludwig Trautmann in the lead roles. It is a sequel to People and Masks.

== Cast ==
- Hedda Vernon
- Ludwig Trautmann
