= Hubert Moest =

German film director, writer, producer, and actor

- Born: Richard Hubert Moest; 3 December 1877; Cologne, North Rhine-Westphalia, German Empire
- Died: 5 December 1953 (aged 76); Berlin, Germany
- Occupation: Director
- Spouses: Hedda Vernon (m. 1913, divorced) Elly Charlotte Liepmann (m. 1923)

Hubert Moest (3 December 1877 – 5 December 1953) was a German film director, writer, producer, and actor.

== Early life and career ==
Moest was the son of the sculptor Richard Moest. He attended high school in Cologne, an art school and worked as a painter. In 1895, he began performing as an actor and opera singer on stages in Bad Godesberg, Hagen and other cities of West Germany. He came to Berlin in 1912 and was part of the theater at Nollendorfplatz. In the same year he was also active as a theater director. In 1913 he married actress Hedda Vernon.

He began acting in 1914 and was part of many comedy films. His first film as a director was Selbstgerichtet oder Die Gelbe Fratze in which his wife Hedda Vernon was the lead actress.

He served in the army during World War I. He founded a film production company Moest-Film GmbH. In January 1922 Waldemar von Briger acquired most of the shares of the company and hence Moest resigned from the company and created Moest-Produktions GmbH. In April, 1922 after the failure of his film project he founded Aladin-Film Co. AG.

In 1923, he married Jewish Elly Charlotte Liepmann and after Adolf Hitler imposed restrictions on Jews, Moest led a very difficult life and worked as an assistant in the company Elekta-Film in Prague.

== Filmography ==
This is the selected filmography of Hubert Moest

=== Director ===
- Selbstgerichtet oder Die Gelbe Fratze (1914)
- Maria Niemand und ihre zwölf Väter (1915)
- The Knitting Needles (1916)
- His Coquettish Wife (1916)
- The Prisoner of Dahomey (1918)
- The Bracelet (1918)
- During My Apprenticeship (1919)
- Blonde Poison (1919)
- The Women House of Brescia (1920)
- Lady Godiva (1921)
- Goetz von Berlichingen of the Iron Hand (1925)

=== Actor ===
- Menschen und Masken (1913)
- Die Millionenmine (1914)
- Die Narbe am Knie (1918)
- Der Hampelmann (1919)
- Lepain, der König der Verbrecher - 4. Teil (1920)
- Lepain, der König der Verbrecher - 3. Teil (1920)

=== Producer ===
- Ut mine stromtid (1919)
- Die Jungfrau von Kynast (1921)
- Die reine Sünderin (1921)
- Das Zimmer mit den sieben Türen, 2. Teil - Lebensschicksale (1921)
- Das Zimmer mit den sieben Türen, 1. Teil - Der Schatz des Inka (1921)
