= The Woman from the Orient =

1923 film

- Directed by: Wolfgang Neff
- Written by: Walter Wassermann
- Starring: Oskar Marion; Fritz Greiner; Hedda Vernon
- Cinematography: Joseph Rona
- Production company: Orplid-Film
- Release date: 1923
- Country: Germany
- Languages: Silent; German intertitles

The Woman from the Orient (German: Die Frau aus dem Orient) is a 1923 German silent film directed by Wolfgang Neff and starring Oskar Marion, Fritz Greiner and Hedda Vernon.

The film's sets were designed by the art director Franz Schroedter.

== Cast ==
- Oskar Marion as Marcel Regard
- Fritz Greiner as Emir Said
- Hedda Vernon as Miss Pawlett
- Ernst Rückert as Percy Manot
- Dary Holm as Lu
- Esther Carena as Claire Barraine
- Josef Karma as Astronomieprofessor

== Bibliography ==
- Alfred Krautz. International directory of cinematographers, set- and costume designers in film, Volume 4. Saur, 1984.
