= Friedrich Kühne =

German actor

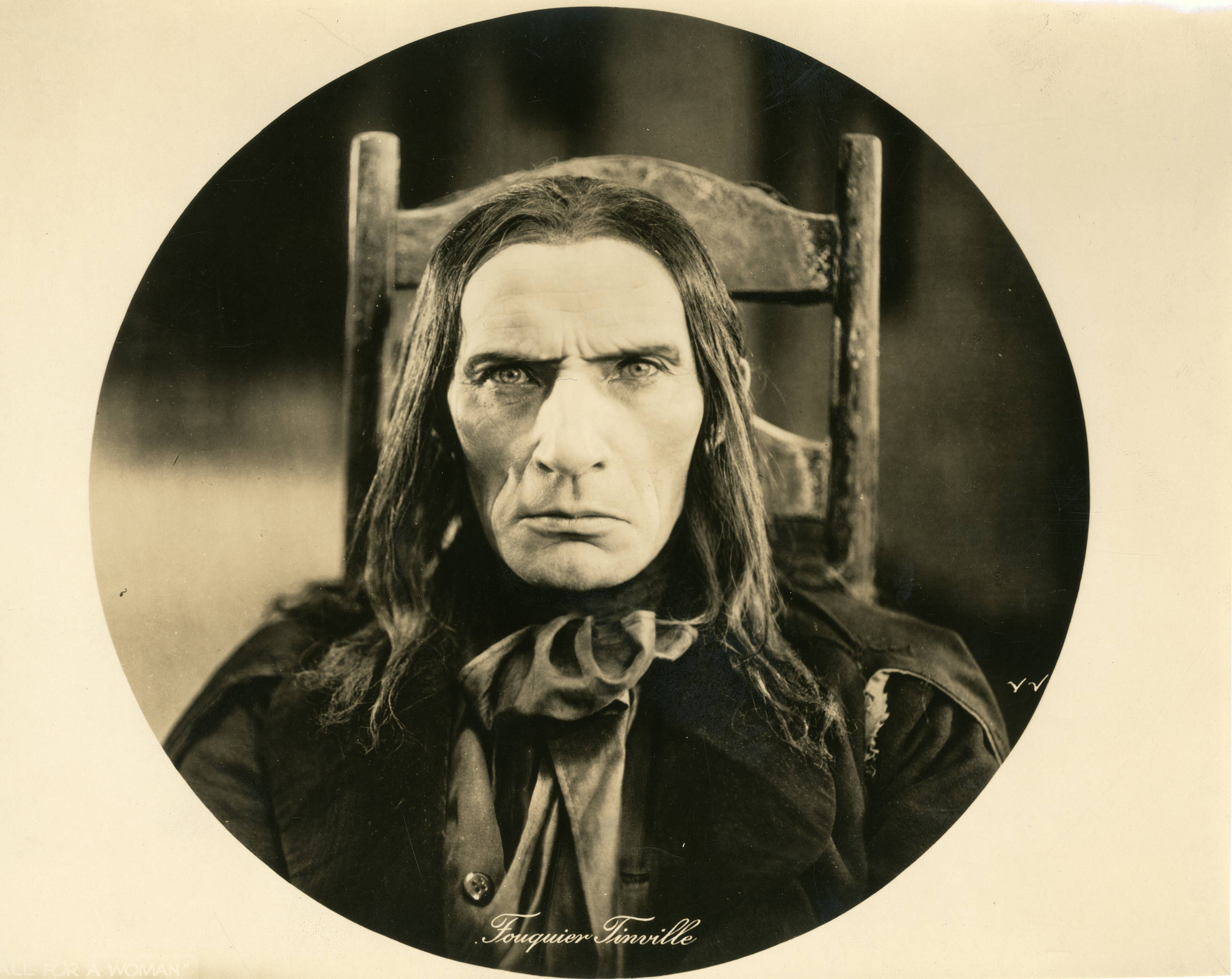
- Born: Franz Michna; 24 April 1870; Slavonín, Moravia, Austria-Hungary
- Died: 13 October 1959 (aged 89); East Berlin, East Germany
- Occupation: Actor
- Years active: 1913–1957

Friedrich Kühne (24 April 1870 – 13 October 1959), born Franz Michna, was a German film actor of the silent era. He appeared in more than 100 films between 1913 and 1957.

== Selected filmography ==
- The Iron Cross (1914)
- Detektiv Braun (1914)
- Der Hund von Baskerville (The Hound of the Baskervilles) (1914) as Stapleton
- The Silent Mill (1914)
- Tales of Hoffmann (1916)
- Ferdinand Lassalle (1918)
- The Prisoner of Dahomey (1918)
- Alraune, die Henkerstochter, genannt die rote Hanne (1918)
- Opium (1919)
- Veritas Vincit (1919)
- The Spiders (1919-1920, 2 parts)
- Judith Trachtenberg (1920)
- The Song of the Puszta (1920)
- Lady Hamilton (1921)
- The Terror of the Red Mill (1921)
- The Black Panther (1921)
- Danton (1921)
- Children of Darkness (1921)
- Hashish, the Paradise of Hell (1921)
- Treasure of the Aztecs (1921)
- Die Gezeichneten (1922)
- The False Dimitri (1922)
- Bigamy (1922)
- The Lodging House for Gentleman (1922)
- Othello (1922)
- Lola Montez, the King's Dancer (1922)
- A Dying Nation (1922)
- The Testament of Joe Sivers (1922)
- The Earl of Essex (1922)
- The Loves of Pharaoh (1922)
- The Man in the Iron Mask (1923)
- The Unknown Tomorrow (1923)
- A Night's Adventure (1923)
- Orient Fever (1923)
- Prater (1924)
- Carlos and Elisabeth (1924)
- By Order of Pompadour (1924)
- Goetz von Berlichingen of the Iron Hand (1925)
- The Man on the Comet (1925)
- Living Buddhas (1925)
- The Golden Calf (1925)
- Lützow's Wild Hunt (1927)
- The Transformation of Dr. Bessel (1927)
- The Flute Concert of Sanssouci (1930)
- Frauenschicksale (1952)
- Anna Susanna (1953)
