= His Coquettish Wife =

1916 film directed by Hubert Moest

- Directed by: Hubert Moest
- Produced by: Franz Vogel
- Starring: Hedda Vernon; Erich Kaiser-Titz; Reinhold Schünzel
- Cinematography: Paul Adler
- Production company: Eiko-Film
- Release date: September 1916
- Country: Germany
- Languages: Silent; German intertitles

His Coquettish Wife (German: Seine kokette Frau) is a 1916 German silent film directed by Hubert Moest and starring Hedda Vernon, Erich Kaiser-Titz and Reinhold Schünzel.

== Cast ==
- Hedda Vernon
- Erich Kaiser-Titz
- Reinhold Schünzel
- Stefanie Hantzsch

== Bibliography ==
- Bock, Hans-Michael & Bergfelder, Tim. The Concise CineGraph. Encyclopedia of German Cinema. Berghahn Books, 2009.
