= Hedda Vernon =

German actress

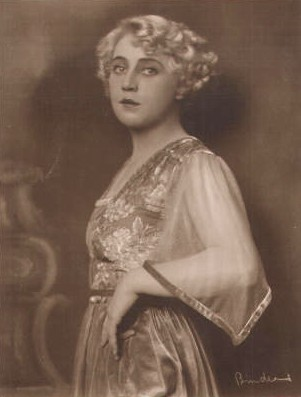
- Vernon, 1910s
- Born: Hedwig Klara Kemp; 27 October 1888; Rummelsburg, Pomerania, German Empire
- Died: 1961 (aged 72–73); Munich, West Germany
- Occupation(s): Actress, screenwriter, film producer
- Spouses: Ernst Heinrich Emil Heese (m. 1909, divorced) Hubert Moest (m. 1913, divorced) Ernst Hofmann (m. 1917, divorced) Anjo Lacinik (m. 1950, 1960)

Hedda Vernon (born Hedwig Klara Kemp; 27 October 1888 – 1961) was a German actress, screenwriter, and film producer. She was a prominent star of the early Weimar Republic, and had her own film production company.

== Early life ==
Hedwig Klara Kemp was born on 27 October 1888 to Karl Martin Friedrich Kemp (1849–1901), the owner of a brewery, and Pauline Auguste Karoline Kemp (née Koball, 1855–1935), a housewife. She had three brothers and four sisters.

== Career ==
Vernon was hired in 1912 by the German Bioscope as an actress. She made her screen debut in 1912 in the silent film Die Papierspur (The Paper Trail), directed by Emil Albes. The following year she acted in the Vitascope films Menschen und Masken (People and Masks) and Menschen und Masken – 2. Teil (People and Masks Part 2), directed by Harry Piel. She also worked in other films directed by Piel and collaborated with Max Obal until 1914. Some of her early films are The Struggle for the Heritage (1912), The Brown Beast (1914), and The Iron Cross (1914).

In 1914 she founded her own production company, Hedda Vernon Films, in Berlin and produced her own films for the Hedda Vernon series, including the self-directed The Yellow Grimace (1914) and Hedda Vernon's Stage Sketch (1916).

She also acted in several Eiko Film productions until the end of World War I, mainly under the direction of her husband Hubert Moest, who founded his own production company, Moest Production, in 1919. Vernon wrote the screenplay for two Moest Production films, The Red Shoes (1917) and The Dead Secret (1918). She also acted in the company's 1920 silent film The Women House of Brescia, which was rejected by the British Board of Film Classification on grounds of prostitution depicted in the film. In the silent film Zofia (released 1915), she played the role of a 15-year-old girl, although she was almost 29 years old at the time.

In the 1920s, interest in Vernon subsided since new actresses were in demand. She worked from 1920 to 1921 with Harry Piel in the film series The Headless Horseman. She also took many supporting roles and acted in The Despisers of Death(1920) and The Sun of St. Moritz (1923). The last known film starring Vernon was Between Two Women, which appeared in cinemas in 1925. Overall, Vernon acted in 70 silent films from 1912 to 1925.

== Personal life ==
Vernon's first marriage was to Ernst Heinrich Emil Heese on 29 December 1909. They divorced, and she remarried in 1913 to the director, producer, screenwriter, and actor Hubert Moest. They divorced, and she married a third time on 10 September 1917 to actor Ernst Hofmann. Vernon was married to golf teacher Andreas Anjo Lacinik when she died in München in 1961 at the age of 73.

== Selected filmography ==
- The Iron Cross (1914)
- His Coquettish Wife (1916)
- Blonde Poison (1919)
- During My Apprenticeship (1919)
- The Women House of Brescia (1920)
- Jim Cowrey is Dead (1921)
- Lady Godiva (1921)
- The Sun of St. Moritz (1923)
- The Woman from the Orient (1923)
