= Vengeance Is Mine (1916 film) =

1916 film directed by Rudolf Meinert

- Directed by: Rudolf Meinert
- Written by: Ewald André Dupont
- Produced by: Rudolf Meinert
- Starring: Hans Mierendorff; Herr Forstner; Marie von Buelow; Ernst Pittschau
- Production company: Meinert Film
- Release date: 1916
- Country: Germany
- Languages: Silent; German intertitles

Vengeance Is Mine (German: Mein ist die Rache) is a 1916 German silent crime film directed by Rudolf Meinert and starring Hans Mierendorff, Herr Forstner and Marie von Buelow. It was part of a popular series of films featuring the fictional detective Harry Higgs. It was the first screenplay written by Ewald André Dupont, who later went on to be a leading filmmaker.

== Cast ==
- Hans Mierendorff – Harry Higgs
- Herr Forstner – Graf Löwe
- Marie von Buelow
- Ernst Pittschau
- Erna Flemming
- Alice Ferron
- Stefanie Hantzsch
- Franz Ramharter
- Franz Verdier
- Johannes Müller

== Bibliography ==
- Bergfelder, Tim & Bock, Hans-Michael. The Concise Cinegraph: Encyclopedia of German. Berghahn Books, 2009.
