= Arkadii Elistratov =

Law professor

- Born: Arkadii Ivanovich Elistratov; 1872

Academic work
- Discipline: Police law
- Institutions: Moscow University

Arkadii Ivanovich Elistratov (1872-?) was professor of police law at Moscow University. In the 1910s he drafted laws to end the regulation of prostitution and to outlaw it instead.

== Selected publications ==
- O prikreplenii zhenshchiny k prostitutsii. Kazan, 1903.
- "Bednost' i prostitutsiia" in Soiuz zhenshchin, Nos. 3–4. (October–November 1907): 5–7; 4–7.
- "Meditsinskaia statistika zashchitnikov politsii nravov" in Trudy s"ezda po bor'be s torgom zhenshchinami i ego prichinami proiskhodivshchago v S.-Peterburge s 21 do 25 aprelia 1910 goda, Vol. 2., St. Petersburg, 1911–12.
- "Rol' prava i nravstvennosti v bor'be s torgom i kupleiu zhenshchin v tseliakh razvrata" in Trudy s"ezda po bor'be s torgom zhenshchinami i ego prichinami proiskhodivshchago v S.-Peterburge s 21 do 25 aprelia 1910 goda, Vol. 2, St. Petersburg, 1911–12.
- Ocherk administrativnogo prava. 1922.
- "Prostitutsiia v Rossii do revoliutsii 1917 g" in Prostitutsiia v Rossii. Moscow, 1927.(Joint editor with Volf M. Bronner)
