= Soviet–German Syphilis Expedition =

Joint Soviet and German expedition that took place in 1928

Soviet-German Syphilis Expedition
- Buryatia within Russia in 2008
- Project type: Medical research
- Objective: Efficacy of salvarsan on syphilis
- Location: Buryat-Mongolia
- Duration: 1928 –

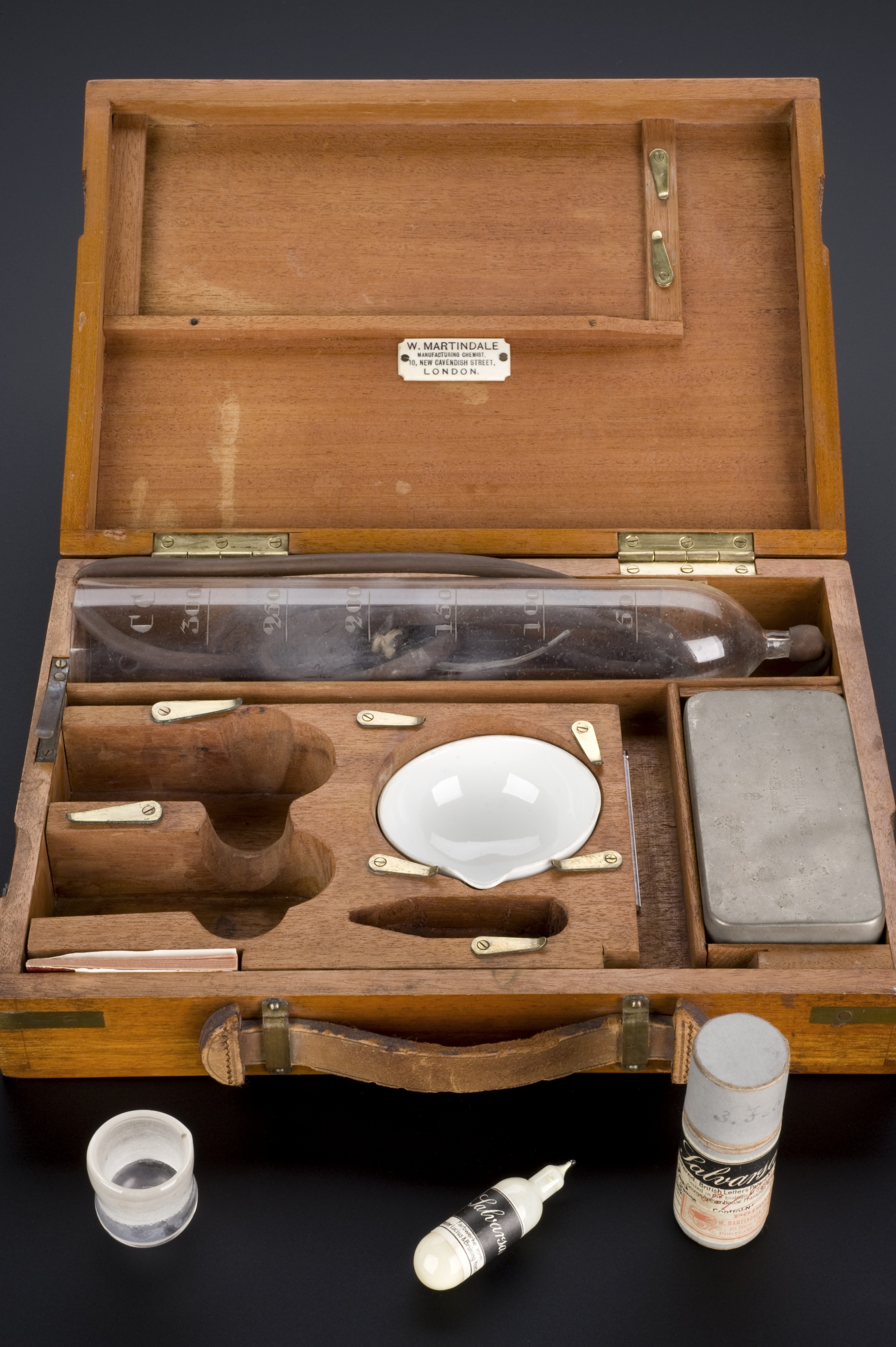
Salvarsan treatment kit for syphilis, Germany, 1909–1912

The Soviet–German Syphilis Expedition was a joint Soviet and German expedition that took place in 1928. It comprised eight medical researchers from each country and its purpose was to investigate endemic syphilis in the Kul’skoe region of the Buryat-Mongolian Autonomous Republic in Siberia and to determine the efficacy of the anti-syphilis drug Salvarsan. The expedition concluded, contrary to expectations, that although affected by poor sanitation and lifestyle, the spread of syphilis in the area was caused primarily by sexual activity.

== Background ==
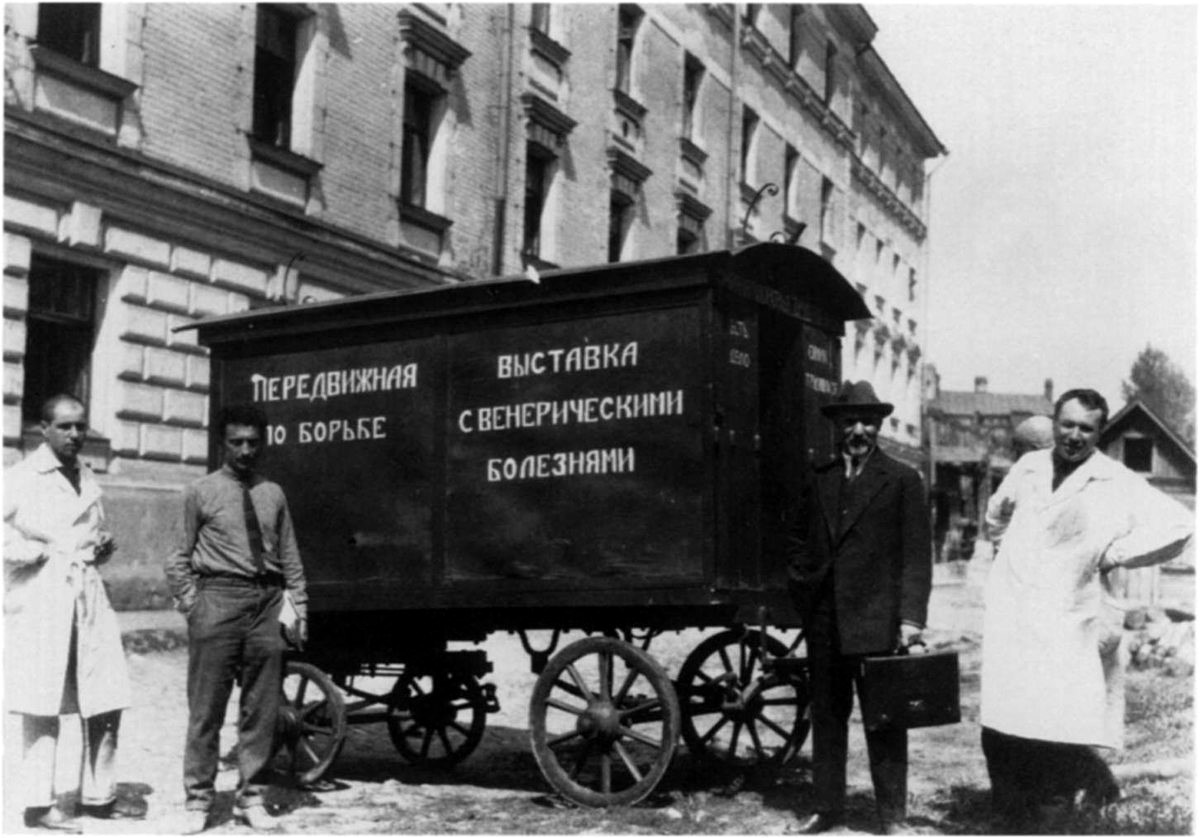
Soviet anti-syphilis propaganda, Moscow, 1926. Image shows Dr Volf Bronner to the right of the wagon, all outside the State Venereological Institute. Photographed by Dr Karl Wilmanns.

The organism causing syphilis was identified in 1905 by dermatologist Erich Hoffmann and zoologist Fritz Schaudinn. The Wassermann test for syphilis and the anti-syphilis drug Salvarsan were developed soon after.

In 1956, Pyotr Vasilievich Kozhewnikov of the Institute of Advanced Medical Studies for Physicians in Leningrad wrote that before 1917 there were no planned methods of syphilis control in Russia despite the disease being widespread there. After the Russian Revolution the Soviet government started a large-scale programme to monitor the disease, using "expeditions" to remote regions to gather information. There were more than 1,000 "expeditions" between 1917 and 1940.

== The expedition ==
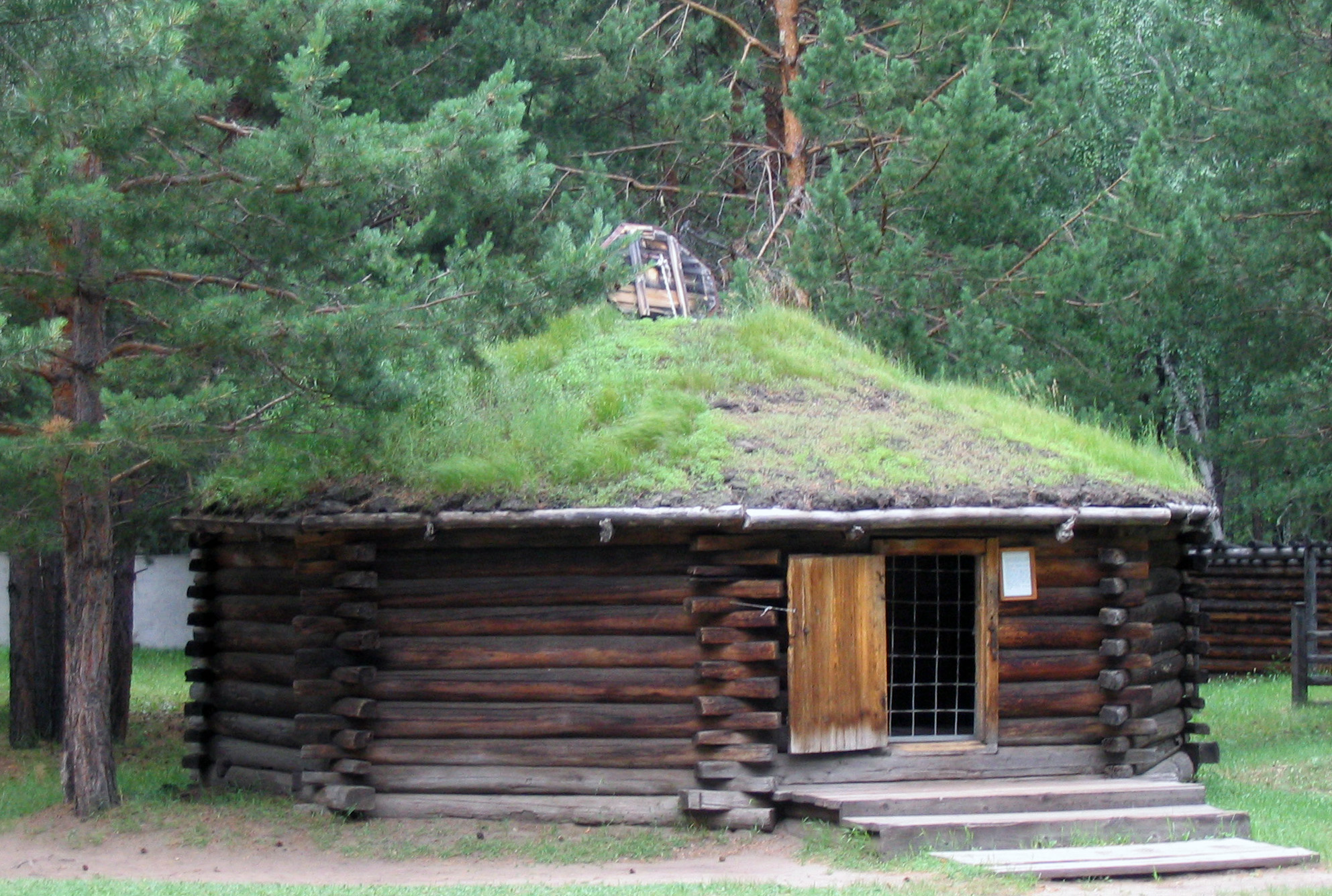
Traditional Buryat yurt. Ethnographic Museum, Ulan Ude.

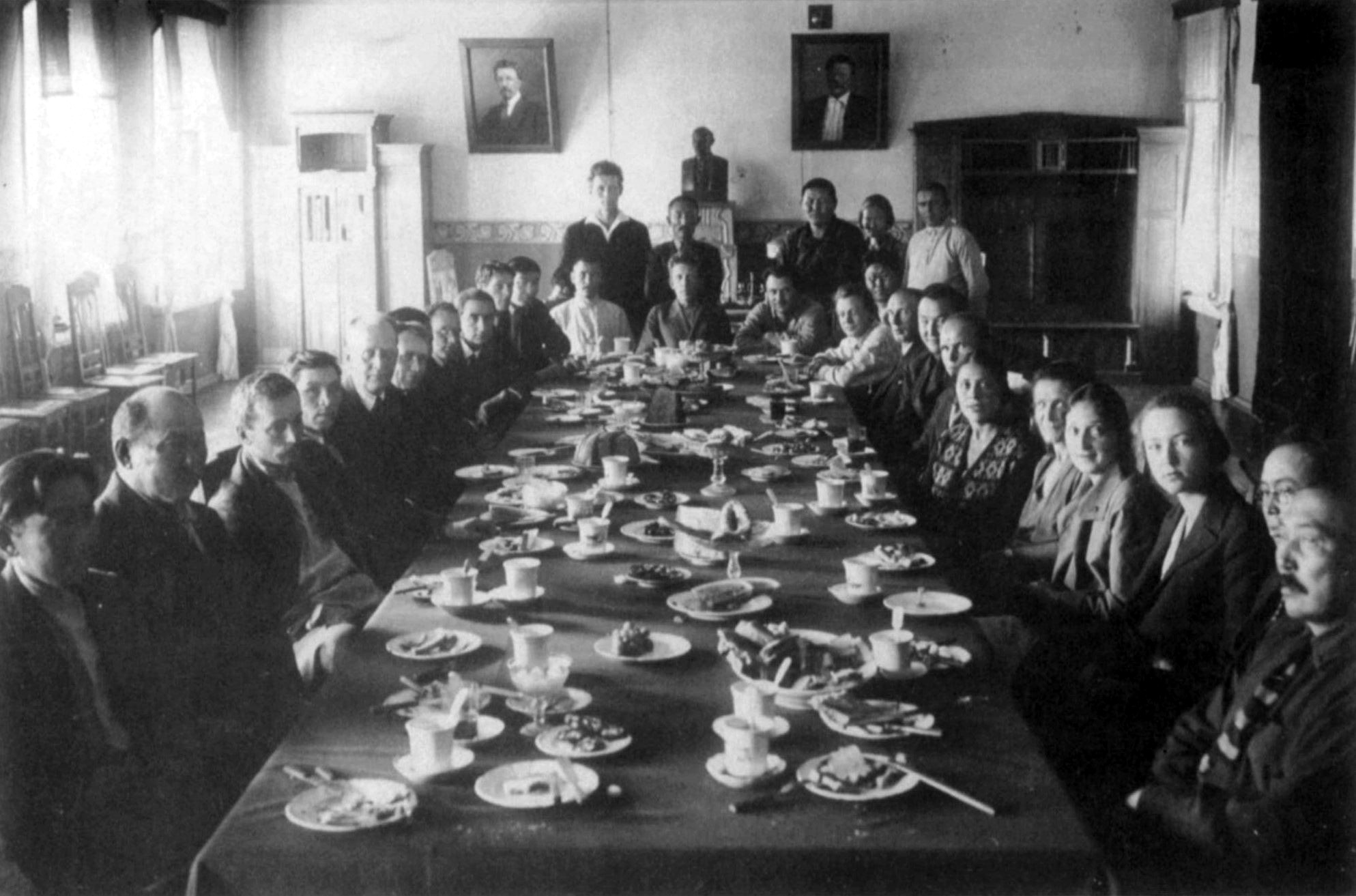
Soviet and German syphilis researchers at Kul'skoe, Summer 1928.

Planning for the Soviet–German Syphilis Expedition started in 1924, one year after Buryatia became an Autonomous Soviet Socialist Republic of the Soviet Union. The chosen target, Kul’skoe, was 200 kilometers north of the capital, Verchne Udinsk (now Ulan-Ude). The degree of syphilis in the area had been mapped out over the previous few years and found to have a prevalence of between 42 and 63% of the population.

The expedition was jointly organised by the Notgemeinschaft der Deutschen Wissenschaft headed by Friedrich Schmidt-Ott, the commissariat for public health service (Department of Venereal Disease) of the USSR and the Russian Academy of Sciences.

A pilot study was conducted in 1926 and the full expedition took place in 1928. It comprised eight medical researchers from each country and its purpose was to investigate endemic syphilis in the Kul’skoe region and to determine the efficacy of the anti-syphilis drug Salvarsan. The Buryats, whose religion prohibited bathing, were chosen as subjects because they were seen as a "primitive race" within which the disease was known to be widespread. German dermatologist Max Jessner took a leading role in the expedition.

The researchers used questionnaires and interviews to gather information about the sexual activity of the Buryats as well as matters such as alcoholism and classifying people according to age and marital status. The resulting information was translated and transcribed as many of the respondents were illiterate.

== Conclusions and legacy ==
The expedition provoked disputes as the Soviets and Germans had different motives for participating which was reflected in difficulties preparing the joint report of the expedition.

Previously, the cause of syphilis in the Buryat people was felt to be primarily "non-venereal", that is, not thought to be transmitted through sexual contact. The Soviet researchers determined, contrary to expectations, that in the case of the Buryats, the disease was mainly transmitted through sexual activity. They did not discount the influence of poor sanitation and lifestyle, but with their methods on contact tracing, placed a greater onus on the spread of syphilis through sexual activity. The sexual habits of the Buryats, beginning early in life, being casual and short term, were more significant. The researchers also took note of the economic and social conditions affecting Buryat society and saw potential for change. According to Francine Hirsch, "Both research groups portrayed the "Buryats as a 'primitive' people with a 'backward' culture who were in danger of extinction."

The German theory that syphilitic Buryats were different to syphilitic Europeans was not demonstrated as the treatment with salvarsan showed no difference in efficacy between the two peoples. The expedition was seen as essentially two expeditions with two agendas and it ended after only three months.

The Lilly Library hold six volumes of photographs from the expedition.
