= Ferdinand Lassalle (film) =

1918 film directed by Rudolf Meinert

- Directed by: Rudolf Meinert
- Written by: Ewald André Dupont; Harry Scheff
- Produced by: Rudolf Meinert
- Cinematography: A.O. Weitzenberg
- Production company: Meinert Film
- Distributed by: Meinert Film
- Release date: 1 September 1918
- Country: Germany
- Languages: Silent; German intertitles

Ferdinand Lassalle is a 1918 German silent historical film directed by Rudolf Meinert. It portrays the life of Ferdinand Lassalle.

== Cast ==
In alphabetical order

- Ernst Behmer
- Herr Braun as Otto von Bismarck
- Arnold Czempin
- Ernst Dohm
- Hans Duncker
- Herr Gross
- Victor Janson
- Anna Jordan
- Erich Kaiser-Titz as Ferdinand Lassalle
- Friedrich Kühne as Heinrich Heine
- Herr Loewe as Arbeiter
- Hanna Ralph as Gräfin Hatzfeld
- Eugen Rex
- Herr Richter
- Herr Sand
- Thea Sandten
- Hermann Seldeneck
- Bodo Serp as Hans von Bülow
- Fritz Spira
- Lu Synd
- Ludwig Trautmann as Arbeiter
- Herr van der Kelen
- General von Pfuel
- Gustav von Wangenheim as Janko von Rakowitza
- Käthe Wittenberg

== Bibliography ==
- J. Hoberman. Bridge of Light: Yiddish Film Between Two Worlds. UPNE, 2010.
