= Louis Ralph =

Austrian actor

- Louis Ralph in Spies (1928)
- Born: Ludwig Josef Musik; 17 August 1878; Graz, Styria, Austria-Hungary
- Died: 16 September 1952 (aged 74); Berlin, Germany

Louis Ralph (born Ludwig Josef Musik; 17 August 1878 – 16 September 1952) was an Austrian film actor and director.

He was born Ludwig Musik in Graz, Styria, Austria-Hungary (now Austria), and died in Berlin at age 74.

== Selected filmography ==
- Die Vila der Narenta (1919)
- Der Schatzgräber von Blagaj (1919)
- Diamonds (1920)
- Lady Hamilton (1921)
- The Golden Plague (1921)
- The Lodging House for Gentleman (1922)
- The Inheritance (1922)
- The Unknown Tomorrow (1923)
- The Green Manuela (1923)
- The Love of a Queen (1923)
- The Final Mask (1924)
- The Voice of the Heart (1924)
- Tragedy in the House of Habsburg (1924)
- Orient (1924)
- The Humble Man and the Chanteuse (1925)
- The Elegant Bunch (1925)
- Our Emden (1926)
- The Circus of Life (1926)
- The Queen Was in the Parlour (1927)
- Ghost Train (1927)
- Alpine Tragedy (1927)
- The Little Slave (1928)
- Escape from Hell (1928)
- Casanova's Legacy (1928)
- Alraune (1928)
- Spione (1928)
- Cyanide (1930)
- Road to Rio (1931)
- The Virtuous Sinner (1931)
- The Yellow House of Rio (1931)
- Cruiser Emden (1932)
- Grandstand for General Staff (1932)
- Decoy (1934)
- My Heart Calls You (1934)
- Artisten (1935)
- Doctor Engel (1936)
- The Deruga Case (1938)
- Congo Express (1939)
- The Way to Freedom (1941)
- The Thing About Styx (1942)
- Die goldene Stadt (1942)
- Laugh Bajazzo (1943)
- I pagliacci (1943)
