= The Pearls of Lady Harrison =

1922 film

- Directed by: Heinz Herald
- Starring: Heinrich George; Gertrude Welcker
- Release date: 1922
- Country: Germany
- Languages: Silent; German intertitles

The Pearls of Lady Harrison (German:Die Perlen der Lady Harrison) is a 1922 German silent film directed by Heinz Herald and starring Heinrich George.

== Bibliography ==
- Hans-Michael Bock and Tim Bergfelder. The Concise Cinegraph: An Encyclopedia of German Cinema. Berghahn Books.
