= Hermann Seldeneck =

German actor (1864–1922)

- Born: 13 September 1864; Munich, Kingdom of Bavaria
- Died: April 1922
- Occupation: Actor
- Years active: 1911-1920

Hermann Seldeneck (13 September 1864 - April 1922) was a German actor. He appeared in more than fifty films from 1911 to 1920.

== Selected filmography ==
Year	Title	Role	Notes
1913	Die schwarze Natter		
1918	The Flight of Arno Jessen	Bank Director	
1918	Ferdinand Lassalle		
1919	Charlotte Corday		
1919	Not of the Woman Born	Ulrich Freiherr von Eynsidel	
