= The Marriage of Luise Rohrbach =

- Directed by: Rudolf Biebrach
- Written by: Emmi Elert (novel); Carl Froelich; Robert Wiene
- Produced by: Oskar Messter
- Starring: Henny Porten; Emil Jannings; Ludwig Trautmann
- Cinematography: Karl Freund
- Music by: Giuseppe Becce
- Production company: Messter Film
- Release date: 2 February 1917
- Country: Germany
- Languages: Silent; German intertitles

The Marriage of Luise Rohrbach (German: Die Ehe der Luise Rohrbach) is a 1917 German silent drama film directed by Rudolf Biebrach and starring Henny Porten, Emil Jannings and Ludwig Trautmann. The film was based on a novel by Emmi Elert.

== Premise ==
A young teacher marries a factory owner, who turns out to be extremely brutal. She eventually leaves him for a kinder, gentler man.

== Cast ==
- Henny Porten as Luise Rohrbach
- Emil Jannings as Wilhelm Rohrbach
- Ludwig Trautmann as Lawyer Rütling
- Rudolf Biebrach as Schuldirektor
- Frida Richard as Mutter des Ermordeten
- Klara Berger

== Bibliography ==
- Jung, Uli & Schatzberg, Walter. Beyond Caligari: The Films of Robert Wiene. Berghahn Books, 1999.
