= Louise de Lavallière (film) =

1922 film

- Directed by: Georg Burghardt
- Written by: Wilhelm Brennecke
- Produced by: Karl Julius Fritzsche
- Starring: Emmy Schaeff; Fritz Delius; Ernst Hofmann
- Cinematography: Karl Freund; Martin Knoops
- Production companies: Drehwa-Film; Transozean Film
- Distributed by: Zenith Filmverleih
- Release date: 5 January 1922
- Country: Germany
- Languages: Silent; German intertitles

Louise de Lavallière is a 1922 German silent historical film directed by Georg Burghardt and starring Emmy Schaeff, Fritz Delius and Ernst Hofmann. It portrays the life of the seventeenth century French courtesan Louise de La Vallière, a lover of Louis XIV.

The film's sets were designed by the art director Botho Hoefer.

== Cast ==
- Emmy Schaeff as Louise de La Valliére
- Fritz Delius as Louis XIV
- Ernst Hofmann as Graf Pierre de Renauld
- Eva Speyer as Maria Theresia
- Olga Engl as Anna von Österreich
- Erna Morena as Henriette Anna von England
- Leo Connard as Herzog Philipp von Orleans
- Poldi Augustin as Marquise von Remis
- Hans Wassmann as Graf de Guiche
- Max Kronert as La Vienne, Kammerdiener
- Gertrude Hoffman as Marquise Françoise Athenais von Montespan
- Kurt Middendorf as Herzog von Lauzun
- Boris Michailow as Colbert, Generalkontrolleur
- Max Mothes as André Le Nôtre, Chef der königlichen Gärten
- Toni Tetzlaff as Gräfin von Soisson, Oberhofmeisterin
- Sophie Pagay as Madame Voisin

== Bibliography ==
- Grange, William. Cultural Chronicle of the Weimar Republic. Scarecrow Press, 2008.
