= The ABC of Love (1916 film) =

1916 film

- Directed by: Magnus Stifter
- Written by: Martin Jørgensen; Louis Levy
- Starring: Asta Nielsen
- Cinematography: Carl Ferdinand Fischer
- Production company: Saturn-Film
- Release date: 16 August 1916
- Running time: 50 minutes
- Country: Germany
- Languages: Silent; German intertitles

The ABC of Love (German: Das Liebes-ABC) is a 1916 German silent comedy film directed by Magnus Stifter and starring Asta Nielsen and Ludwig Trautmann.

== Cast ==
- Asta Nielsen as Lis
- Ludwig Trautmann as Philip von Dobbern
- Magnus Stifter as Graf von Kiesel

== Bibliography ==
- Kuhn, Annette; Radstone, Susannah, eds. (1990). The Women's Companion to International Film. Berkeley: University of California Press. ISBN 978-0-520-08879-5.
