= Gertrude Welcker =

German actress (1896–1988)

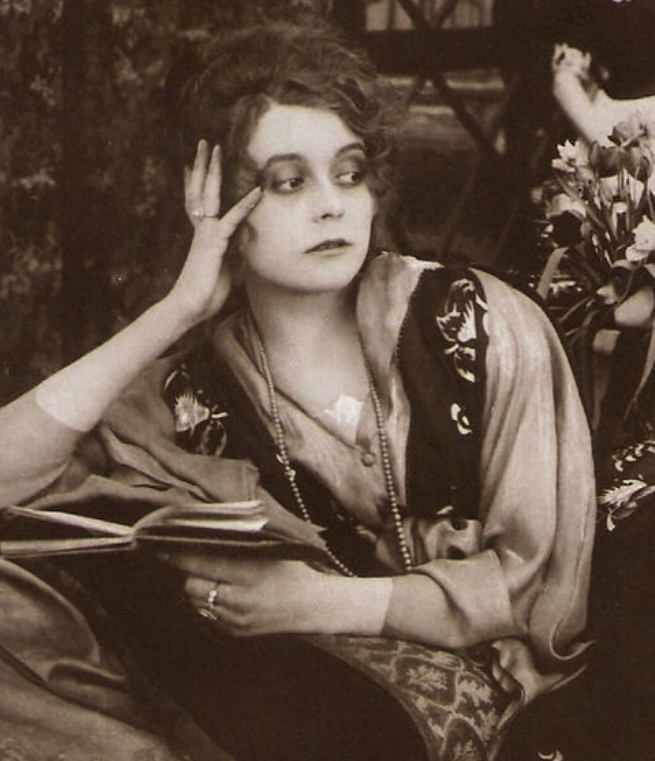
- Born: 16 July 1896; Dresden, German Empire
- Died: 1 August 1988 (aged 92); Danderyd, Stockholm, Sweden
- Other names: Gertrud Welcker; Gertrud Carlsund
- Occupation: Actress
- Years active: 1915–1930
- Spouse: Otto Gustaf Carlsund (m. 1930; div. 1937)

Gertrude Welcker (16 July 1896 – 1 August 1988) was a German stage and silent film actress. She appeared in 64 films between 1917 and 1925.

== Biography ==
Gertrude Welcker was born in Dresden on 16 July 1896. Her father, who was editor-in-chief and general manager of the Posener Tageblatt, died in 1909. She had a younger brother named Herbert (born 1898).

Welcker visited Max Reinhardt's acting school in Berlin during the First World War. From 1915 to 1916 she starred in productions at the Albert Theater in Dresden. From 1916 to 1919 she performed at the Deutsches Theater, Kammerspiele, and Volksbühne. There, she was seen as a prostitute in August Strindberg's Meister Olaf in a production of Ferdinand Gregori, as Lesbia in Felix Hollaender's staging of Friedrich Hebbel's Gyges und sein Ring, as Recha in Lessing's Nathan the Wise, and as sister Martha in Gerhart Hauptmann's Hanneles Himmelfahrt.

In addition to these roles, she played under Marion Reinhardt's direction of Georg Büchner's Danton's Death, a maid Sophie in Friedrich Schiller's Intrigue and Love and Desdemona in William Shakespeare's Othello, and Jessica in The Merchant of Venice.

In 1917 Gertrude Welcker began her career as a film actress. Her film debut was in Eine Nacht in der Stahlkammer (1917), followed by Rafaela (1917). She next appeared as an angel in the film Hans Trutz in the Land of Plenty directed by her stage partner Paul Wegener.

Her most famous roles include Gesine von Orlamünde in Chronicles of the Gray House, and Countess Dusy Told, the wife of a millionaire in Fritz Lang's Dr. Mabuse the Gambler (1922), in which the title character abducts and abuses her. Other major productions in which Welcker participated were Richard Oswald's Lady Hamilton, and Carl Froelich's Luise Miller (after Schiller's Intrigue and Love).

In low-budget productions such as Die Geisha und der Samurai and Eine Frau mit Vergangenheit, she played the lead role.

She portrayed the character of Queen Margaret in the controversial film The Women House of Brescia. The film was rejected by the British Board of Film Classification on grounds that it depicted prostitution.

In 1925 Welcker ended her career as a film actress and in 1930 retired from the stage as well.

In July 1930 she married Swedish painter Otto Gustaf Carlsund, whom she had met during a visit to Paris. They divorced in August 1937. Before the outbreak of World War II she had a brief career as an editor at the Universum Film AG. In 1941 she became active for the Red Cross. Shortly before the end of the war, Gertrude Welcker managed to escape to Sweden, where she spent the rest of her life living under the name Gertrud Carlsund.

Gertrude Welcker died in Danderyd, Stockholm on 1 August 1988. Her estate was rediscovered in 2005.

== Filmography ==
- Hans Trutz in the Land of Plenty (1917)
- Panzerschrank Nr. 13 (1917)
- Mr. Wu (1918)
- Er soll Dein Herr sein (1918)
- Es werde Licht (3) (1918)
- Der Fluch des Nuri (1918)
- Der Tänzer (1918)
- The Adventure of a Ball Night (1918)
- Sein letzter Seitensprung (1918)
- The Mirror of the World (1918)
- Nocturne of Love (1919)
- Der Fluch der Vergangenheit (1919)
- Kurz ist der Frühling (1919)
- Die Geisha und der Samurai (1919), The Geisha and the Samurai
- Die geliebte Tote (1919)
- The Devil and the Madonna (1919)
- Die Verführten (1919)
- The Mask (1919)
- Die Diamanten des Zaren (1919)
- The Dancer (1919)
- Die Duplitzität der Ereignisse (1919)
- Das Werk seines Lebens (1919)
- Algol: Tragedy of Power Algol. Tragödie der Macht (1920)
- The Lady in Black (1920)
- Evening – Night – Morning Abend - Nacht - Morgen (1920)
- Dolls of Death (1920)
- Blackmailed (1920)
- Planetenschieber (1920)
- Die schöne Miß Lilian (1920)
- Fata Morgana (1920)
- Eine Frau mit Vergangenheit (1920)
- The Women House of Brescia (1920)
- The Sons of Count Dossy (1920)
- Seine drei Frauen (1920)
- A Debt of Honour (1921)
- The Flight into Death (1921)
- Lady Godiva (1921)
- The Golden Bullet (1921)
- Lady Hamilton (1921)
- Die Minderjährige (1921)
- Das Recht der freien Liebe (1921)
- Sturmflut des Lebens (1921)
- Jim Cowrey is Dead (1921)
- Dr. Mabuse the Gambler Dr. Mabuse, der Spieler (1921)
- Dämon Zirkus (1922)
- Shadows of the Past (1922)
- The Pearls of Lady Harrison (1922)
- The Anthem of Love (1922)
- Between Evening and Morning (1923)
- Luise Millerin (1923)
- Zaida, the Tragedy of a Model (1923)
- Im Rausche der Leidenschaft (1923)
- Dieter – Der Mann unter den Steinen (1923)
- Marionettes of the Princess (1924)
- The Creature (1924)
- Wege der Liebe (1924)
- Goetz von Berlichingen of the Iron Hand (1925)
- Chronicles of the Gray House (1925)
