= Blonde Poison =

1919 film directed by Hubert Moest

- Directed by: Hubert Moest
- Written by: Paul Langenscheidt (novel)
- Starring: Hedda Vernon; Paul Hartmann; Olga Engl
- Cinematography: Eugen Hamm; Georg Schubert
- Production company: Maak-Film
- Release date: 28 August 1919
- Country: Germany
- Languages: Silent; German intertitles

Blonde Poison (German: Blondes Gift) is a 1919 German silent drama film directed by Hubert Moest and starring Hedda Vernon, Paul Hartmann, and Olga Engl.

The film's sets were designed by the art director Karl Machus.

== Cast ==
- Hedda Vernon as Loni
- Ernst Deutsch as Rolf Roem (Enkel)
- Paul Hartmann as Georg Maudi
- Olga Engl as Frau Scholz (Erzieher)
- Max Laurence as Major Roem
- Reinhold Schünzel as Adolf Reiss
- Marie von Buelow as Frau Roller
- Eduard von Winterstein as Chauffeur

== Bibliography ==
- Bock, Hans-Michael; Bergfelder, Tim, eds. (2009). The Concise Cinegraph: Encyclopaedia of German Cinema. New York: Berghahn Books. ISBN 978-1-57181-655-9.
