= The Lodging House for Gentleman =

1922 film directed by Louis Ralph

- Directed by: Louis Ralph
- Written by: Adelaide René
- Produced by: Richard Oswald
- Starring: Louis Ralph; Karl Etlinger; Friedrich Kühne
- Cinematography: Willy Goldberger
- Production company: Richard-Oswald-Produktion
- Distributed by: National Film
- Release date: 3 March 1922
- Country: Germany
- Languages: Silent; German intertitles

The Lodging House for Gentleman (German: Das Logierhaus für Gentleman) is a 1922 German silent film directed by Louis Ralph and starring Ralph, Karl Etlinger and Friedrich Kühne.

== Cast ==
- Louis Ralph
- Karl Etlinger
- Friedrich Kühne
- Ludwig Trautmann
- Dina Harbitschenko
- Daisy Torrens
- Emil Wittig
- Maria Voigtsberger
- Dagmar Muthardt
- Inge Helgard

== Bibliography ==
- Helga Belach & Wolfgang Jacobsen. Richard Oswald: Regisseur und Produzent. Text + Kritik, 1990.
