= Lady Godiva (1921 film) =

1921 film directed by Hubert Moest

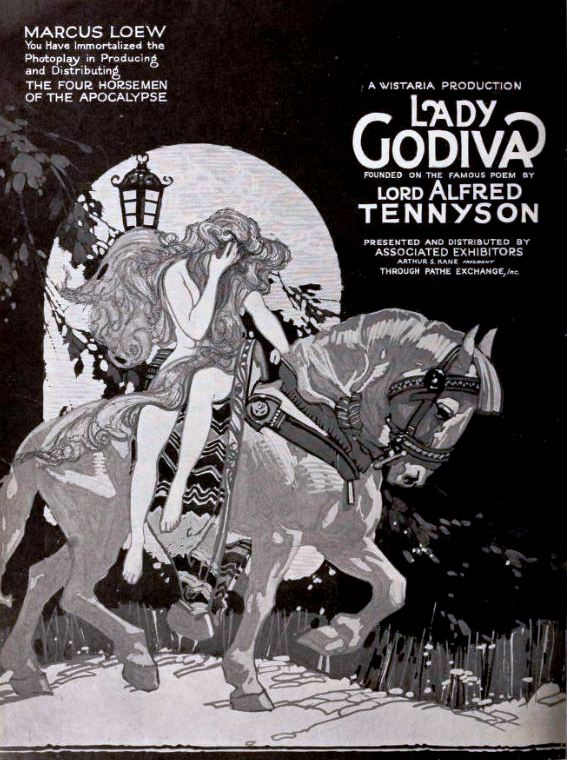
- American advertisement
- Directed by: Hubert Moest
- Written by: Ernst Frank; Arthur Rehbein
- Based on: "Godiva" by Alfred, Lord Tennyson
- Produced by: Walter Caspary
- Starring: Hedda Vernon; Eduard von Winterstein
- Cinematography: Kurt Lande
- Production company: Aß-Film
- Distributed by: Horos-Film
- Release date: 14 April 1921
- Country: Germany
- Language: Silent (German intertitles)

Lady Godiva is a 1921 German silent historical film directed by Hubert Moest and starring Hedda Vernon and Eduard von Winterstein.

The film's sets were designed by the art director Hans Dreier.

== Plot ==
As described in a film magazine, Leofric, a cruel earl of England, threatens a cruel death to the father of the beautiful Lady Godiva (Vernon) if she does not agree to marry him. She then suffers indignities because of her determination to be a wife in name only. The people of Coventry plead with her to intervene with her husband after he threatens to burn down their homes. She succeeds, but only on the condition that she ride unclad on a white horse through the town. She does this, but the earl has disregarded the temper of the people. His palace is undermined and collapses, killing all the people inside. Lady Godiva, warned by the court jester, escapes before the catastrophe, and is reunited with her love, the architect.

== Cast ==
- Ernst Deutsch
- Wilhelm Diegelmann
- Hedwig Pauly-Winterstein
- Hedda Vernon as Lady Godiva
- Eduard von Winterstein as Herzog
- Gertrude Welcker
- Toni Zimmerer

== Reception ==
The film was distributed in the United States in 1922, but was barred from the United Kingdom by the British Board of Film Classification.

== Bibliography ==
- Bock, Hans-Michael & Bergfelder, Tim. The Concise CineGraph. Encyclopedia of German Cinema. Berghahn Books, 2009.
