= State Venereological Institute =

Soviet-Russian research institute

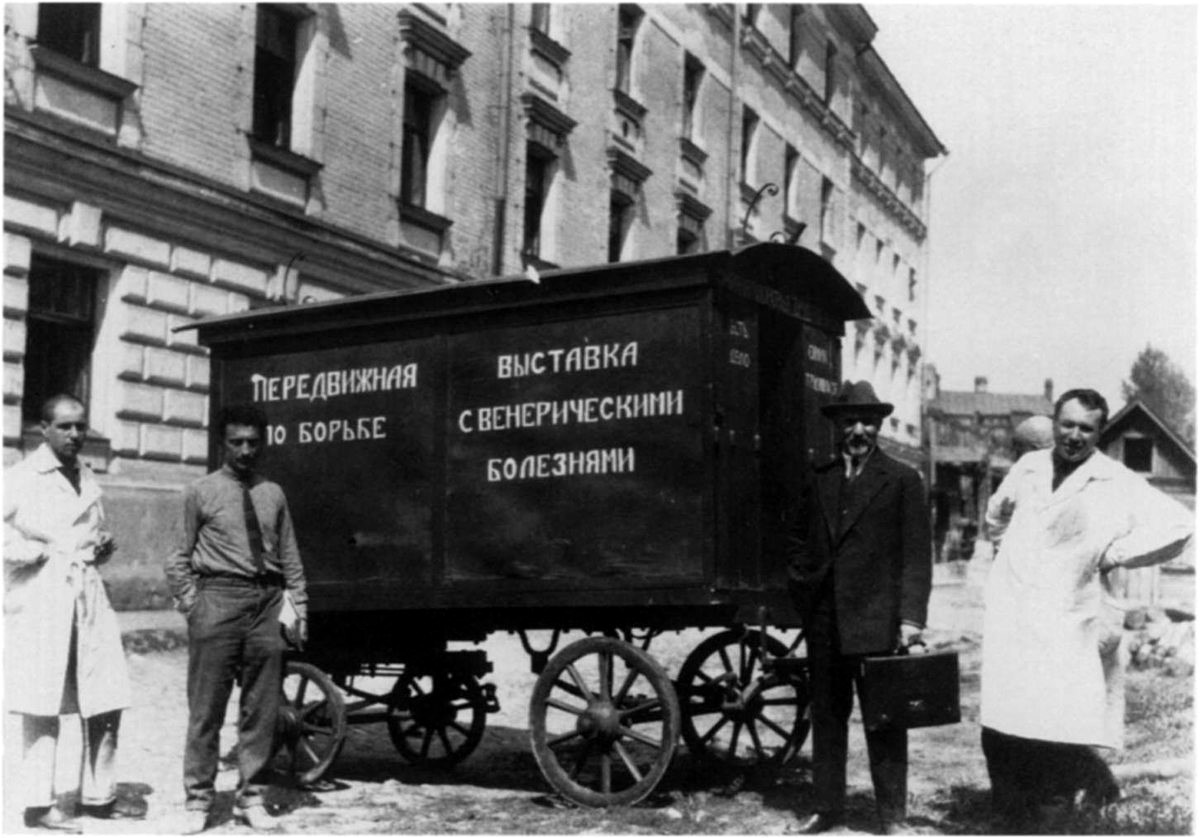
Volf Bronner (right) with Soviet anti-syphilis propaganda wagon outside the State Venereological Institute, 1926

The State Venereological Institute in Moscow was founded by Russian venereologist Volf Bronner in 1922. He became its first director.
