= The Flight of Arno Jessen =

- Directed by: Richard Eichberg
- Written by: Karl Schneider
- Produced by: Richard Eichberg
- Production company: Richard Eichberg-Film
- Distributed by: Central-Film
- Release date: 22 March 1918
- Country: Germany
- Languages: Silent; German intertitles

The Flight of Arno Jessen (German:Die Flucht des Arno Jessen) is a 1918 German silent film directed by Richard Eichberg and starring Ernst Rückert, Eva Speyer and Hermann Seldeneck.

== Cast ==
- Ernst Rückert
- Eva Speyer
- Hermann Seldeneck
- Ellen Richter
- Franz Werter
- Walter Tostary

== Bibliography ==
- Hans-Michael Bock and Tim Bergfelder. The Concise Cinegraph: An Encyclopedia of German Cinema. Berghahn Books.
