= The Prisoner of Dahomey =

- Directed by: Hubert Moest
- Written by: Lene Haase
- Starring: Fritz Delius; Paul Hartmann
- Production company: Deuko Deutsche Kolonial-Film
- Release date: 6 October 1918
- Country: Germany
- Languages: Silent; German intertitles

The Prisoner of Dahomey (German: Der Gefangene von Dahomey) is a 1918 German silent drama film directed by Hubert Moest and starring Fritz Delius and Paul Hartmann.

== Cast ==
- Fritz Delius
- Paul Hartmann
- Friedrich Kühne
- Ursula Stein

== Bibliography ==
- Fuhrmann, Wolfgang. Imperial Projections: Screening the German Colonies. Berghahn Books, 2015.
