= Samuel Jessner =

German dermatologist (1859–1929)

- Born: 21 December 1858; Dorbian (now Darbėnai), Russian Empire
- Died: 7 December 1929 (aged 70)
- Education: University of Königsberg
- Known for: Research on skin and hair symptoms of syphilis
- Children: Max Jessner, Fritz Jessner
- Scientific career
- Fields: Dermatology
- Workplaces: University of Königsberg

Samuel Jessner (21. December 1858 - 7 December 1929) was a German dermatologist known for his work on the skin and hair symptoms of patients with syphilis.

Jessner was born in Dorbian (now Darbėnai), Russian Empire, and studied medicine at the University of Königsberg. After completing his doctorate, he habilitated there as well. He dealt mainly with skin and venereal diseases. He was chairman of the Königsberg branch of the free-religious Deutschen Gesellschaft für ethische Kultur (German Society for Ethical Culture). His sons were the dermatologist Max Jessner and the theater director and director Fritz Jessner.

== Selected publications ==
- Die Hautleiden kleiner Kinder, 1903. 4th edition 1923.
- Diagnose und Therapie des Ekzems, 1905. 3rd edition 1926.
- Salben und Pasten mit besonderer Berücksichtigung des Mitin: Anh.: Rezeptformeln, Kabitzsch, Würzburg, 1905. (Digitized)
- Hauttuberkulose (Lupus vulgaris etc.) einschliesslich Tuberkulide und Lupus erythematodes, 1909.
- Schönheitsfehler und ihre Behandlung, 1910. 6th edition 1923.
- Die praktische Bedeutung des Salvarsan für die Syphilistherapie, Kabitzsch, Würzburg, 1911. (Digitized)
