= The Iron Cross =

1914 film directed by Richard Oswald

- German: Das eiserne Kreuz
- Directed by: Richard Oswald
- Written by: Richard Oswald
- Produced by: Paul Davidson; Jules Greenbaum
- Starring: Friedrich Kühne; Hedda Vernon; Hanni Weisse
- Production company: Vitascope Film
- Distributed by: PAGU
- Release date: 1914
- Country: Germany
- Languages: Silent; German intertitles

The Iron Cross (German: Das eiserne Kreuz) is a 1914 German silent film directed by Richard Oswald and starring Friedrich Kühne, Hedda Vernon, and Hanni Weisse. It marked the directorial debut of Oswald.

It was shot at the Tempelhof Studios.

Despite its patriotic name, the film was seized by the German authorities and all its copies were destroyed due to the film's pacifist nature.

== Cast ==
- Friedrich Kühne
- Hedda Vernon
- Hanni Weisse
- Felix Basch
- Erwin Fichtner
