= Chemical peel =

Removal of the outermost layers of the skin

A chemical peel is a treatment used to smooth the texture of the skin. The skin on the face is most commonly treated, but peels can also be performed on the body. Chemical peels are intended to remove the outermost layers of the skin. To accomplish this task, the chosen peel solution induces a controlled injury to the skin, which causes the skin to peel. This process can reduce fine lines, acne scars, and pigment. Medium depth peels must be performed by a medical provider (MD, NP, RN, or AP Esthetician in certain states).

There are several types of chemical peels.

== History ==
Resurfacing and restoring skin with chemical peel was introduced in the second half of the 19th century by the Austrian dermatologist Ferdinand Ritter von Hebra (1816–1880), founder of the Vienna School of Dermatology. He used exfoliative agents, like phenol, croton oil, nitric acid in various caustic combinations for treating freckles and skin irregularities.

== Types of peels ==
=== α-hydroxy acid peels ===
Alpha hydroxy acids (AHAs) are naturally occurring carboxylic acids such as glycolic acid, a natural constituent of sugar cane juice, and lactic acid, found in sour milk and tomato juice as well as being produced endogenously during normal metabolism and exercise. This is the mildest of the peel formulas and produces light peels for treatment of fine wrinkles, areas of dryness, uneven pigmentation and acne. Alpha hydroxy acids can also be mixed with facial washes, serums or creams in lesser concentrations as part of a daily skin-care regimen to smooth the skin's texture.

There are five usual fruit acids: citric acid, glycolic acid, lactic acid, malic acid and tartaric acid. Many other alpha hydroxy acids exist and are used.

AHA peels are not indicated for treating wrinkles.

AHA peels may cause stinging, skin redness, mild skin irritation, and dryness.

Higher pH levels and lower percentages of hydroxy acids are commonly used as home peels. These will not work as quickly as an in-office procedure, but can be economical for many people.

=== β hydroxy acid peels ===
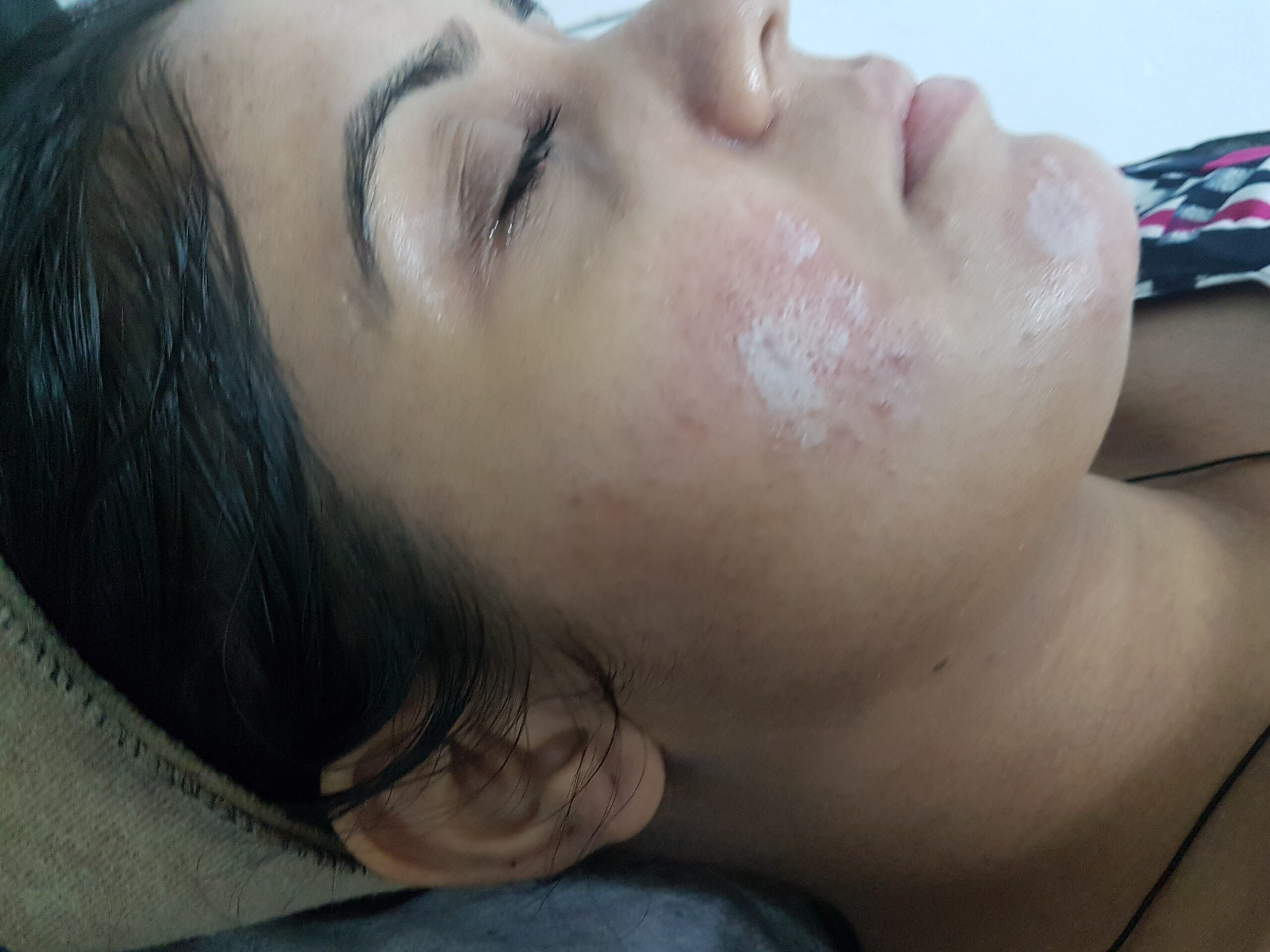
Salicylic Acid used for treatment for acne

Salicylic acid is a beta hydroxy acid. It is antibacterial (mostly bacteriostatic, except in high concentrations when it is more frequently bactericidal) and anti-inflammatory which helps treat acne. Salicylic acid also has the ability to reduce the spots and bumps associated with acne. It is becoming common for beta hydroxy acid (BHA) peels to be used instead of the stronger alpha hydroxy acid (AHA) peels due to BHA's being oil soluble. Studies show that BHA peels control sebum excretion, acne as well as remove dead skin cells to a certain extent better than AHAs due to AHAs only working on the surface of the skin.

=== Retinoic acid peel ===
Retinoic acid is a retinoid. This type of facial peel is also performed in the office of a plastic surgeon, oral and maxillofacial surgeon, or a provider in a medical spa setting. This is a deeper peel than the beta hydroxy acid peel and is used to treat scars, wrinkles, and pigment.

It is usually performed in conjunction with a Jessner; which is performed right before, in order to open up the skin, so the retinoic acid can penetrate deeper into the skin. The client leaves with the chemical peel solution on their face. The peeling process takes place on the third day. More dramatic changes to the skin require multiple peels over time.

=== Phenol-croton oil peel ===
A phenol-croton oil is a type of chemical peel. The term "phenol-croton oil peel" has replaced the vague term "phenol peel" in medical literature. It was originally used on a clandestine basis by early Hollywood stars in the 1920s and was incorporated into mainstream practice in the 1960s by Thomas Baker and Howard Gordon. The active ingredient is croton oil, which causes an intense caustic exfoliating reaction in the skin.

== Complications ==
The deeper the peel, the more complications that can arise. Professional strength chemical peels are typically administered by certified dermatologists or licensed estheticians. Professional peels and lower-concentration DIY home peel kits can pose health risks, including injury and scarring of the skin. Possible complications include photosensitivity, prolonged erythema, pigmentary changes, milia, skin atrophy, and textural changes. Many individuals report professional chemical peels leave a minor yellowish tinge on their skin due to the retinol elements in the peel. This is expected to last 2–3 hours maximum. Varying mild to moderate redness after the procedure is expected.

== Anesthesia ==
Light chemical peels like AHA and BHA are usually done in medical offices or Med Spas. There is minimal discomfort so usually no anesthetic is given because the patient feels only a slight stinging when the solution is applied.

Medium peels such as trichloroacetic acid (TCA) are also performed in the doctor's office or in an ambulatory surgery center as an outpatient procedure and can cause more discomfort. Frequently, the combination of a tranquilizer such as diazepam and an oral analgesic is administered. TCA peels often do not require anesthesia even if the solution itself has - at the contrary of phenol - no numbing effect on the skin. The patient usually feels a warm or burning sensation.

Phenol used to be a deep chemical peel. Early phenol peel solutions were very painful and most practitioners would perform it under either general anesthesia, administered by an anesthesiologist or nurse anesthetist. Today it is more correctly referred to as a croton oil peel, since that has proven to be the active ingredient responsible for most of its effects. Recent formulations allow more variation in the depth of treatment, and allow its use under sedation either orally or intravenously, usually in conjunction with local anesthetic injections.

== See also ==
- List of cutaneous conditions
