= Goetz von Berlichingen of the Iron Hand (1925 film) =

1925 film directed by Hubert Moest

- Directed by: Hubert Moest
- Written by: Hubert Moest; Johann Wolfgang von Goethe (play)
- Starring: Eugen Klöpfer; Friedrich Kühne; Paul Hartmann
- Cinematography: Josef Dietze; Paul Holzki
- Production company: Ring-Film
- Release date: 14 October 1925
- Country: Germany
- Languages: Silent; German intertitles

Goetz von Berlichingen of the Iron Hand (German: Götz von Berlichingen zubenannt mit der eisernen Hand) is a 1925 German silent historical adventure film directed by Hubert Moest and starring Eugen Klöpfer, Friedrich Kühne and Paul Hartmann. It is an adaptation of the 1773 play Götz von Berlichingen by Johann Wolfgang von Goethe.

The film's sets were designed by the art director Gustav A. Knauer.

== Cast ==
- Eugen Klöpfer as Götz von Berlichingen
- Friedrich Kühne
- Paul Hartmann
- Theodor Loos
- Gertrude Welcker
- Erna Morena
- Lucie Höflich
- Grete Reinwald
- Leopold von Ledebur
- Olaf Fjord
- Lothar Müthel
- Fritz Kampers
- Maria Forescu
- Albert Steinrück
- Fritz Rasp
- Hans Brausewetter
- Eduard von Winterstein
- Fritz Greiner
- Kurt Wolowsky
- Richard Ludwig
- Karl Victor Plagge
- Robert Leffler

== Bibliography ==
- Goble, Alan. The Complete Index to Literary Sources in Film. Walter de Gruyter, 1999.
