= The Brown Beast =

1914 film

- Directed by: Harry Piel
- Written by: Harry Piel; Edgar Allan Poe
- Produced by: Jules Greenbaum
- Starring: Ludwig Trautmann; Hedda Vernon
- Cinematography: Alfons Hepke
- Production company: Vitascope
- Release date: 13 February 1914
- Country: Germany
- Languages: Silent; German intertitles

The Brown Beast (German: Die braune Bestie) is a 1914 German silent film directed by Harry Piel and starring Ludwig Trautmann and Hedda Vernon.

== Cast ==
- Ludwig Trautmann
- Hedda Vernon

== Bibliography ==
- Thomas, Douglas B. (1999). The Early History of German Motion Pictures, 1895–1935. Washington, DC: Thomas International. ISBN 978-0-9612128-1-0.
