= Catherine the Great (1920 film) =

1920 film

- Directed by: Reinhold Schünzel
- Written by: Hans Behrendt; Bobby E. Lüthge; Reinhold Schünzel
- Produced by: Arzén von Cserépy
- Starring: Lucie Höflich; Fritz Kortner; Fritz Delius
- Cinematography: Karl Freund
- Production company: Cserépy-Film
- Release date: 22 October 1920
- Country: Germany
- Languages: Silent; German intertitles

Catherine the Great (German: Katharina die Große) is a 1920 German silent historical film directed by Reinhold Schünzel and starring Lucie Höflich, Fritz Kortner, and Fritz Delius. The film was an epic portrayal of the life of Catherine the Great of Russia. 4,000 extras and 500 horses were used.

== Cast ==
- Lucie Höflich as Catherine the Great
- Fritz Kortner as Potemkin
- Fritz Delius as Gregori Orlov
- Reinhold Schünzel as Tsar Peter
- Paul Hartmann as Alexander Manonov
- Gustav Botz as Alexei Bestuzhev
- Gertrud de Lalsky as Elisabeth
- Mechthildis Thein as Princess Vorontsova
- Leonhard Haskel as Bressan
- Karl Platen as Field Marshal Schwerin
- Hugo Flink as Saltykov
- Ilka Grüning
- Albert Steinrück
- Fritz Junkermann
- Hans Behrendt
- Agna Bergen
- Lo Bergner
- Else Brandus
- Hanne Brinkmann
- Alexander Ekert
- Käthe Ellerbock
- Reinhold François
- Lotte Gühne
- Ellinor Hansen
- Loo Hardy
- Nella Retslag
- Suse Stollberg
- Hedwig Strasser
- Ferdinand von Alten
- Cara von Joe
- Ilse Wilke

== Bibliography ==
- Kreimeier, Klaus (1999). The Ufa Story: A History of Germany's Greatest Film Company, 1918–1945. Berkeley: University of California Press. ISBN 978-0-520-22069-0.
