= Fritz Jessner =

German actor

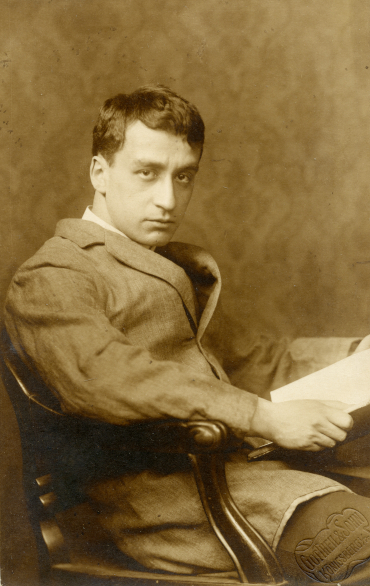
Fritz Jessner

Fritz Jessner (19 August 1889 – 9 July 1946) was a German-American actor and theater director.

== Early life ==
Fritz Jessner was born on 19 August 1889 in Stolp, Pomerania. His father was Samuel Jessner, a dermatologist in Königsberg. He studied law at the University of Leipzig and completed his studies there with a doctorate.

== Theatrical career ==
He then decided to enter the theatre and took acting lessons in Berlin and played under the direction of Max Reinhardt. During the First World War he worked under the direction of his cousin and later brother-in-law Leopold Jessner in Königsberg.

He was at the New Playhouse in Königsberg from 1924, and worked between 1934 and 1936 as a director at the Schauspielhaus of the Jewish Cultural Association in Berlin. He then emigrated to Switzerland, worked as an acting director and senior director at the Stadttheater Bern and taught there at the Conservatoire de Musique.

In 1940, Jessner emigrated to the United States. There he worked until 1942 at the Yale School of Drama and then taught acting at Smith College. He directed several theater productions at the Harvard Dramatic Club and the Cambridge Dramatic Club. He was director of the Theater Workshop of Wellesley College.

== Death ==
Shortly before he was to take up a job as a lecturer at the Dramatic Workshop in New York City, he died on 9 July 1946 in Boston. Jessner was married to the doctor Lucie Jessner.

== Films ==
- 1919: König Nicolo
- 1920: Das Frauenhaus von Brescia
