= Mazeppa, der Volksheld der Ukraine =

- Directed by: Martin Berger
- Written by: Martin Berger
- Produced by: E. H. Zirkel: Werner Krauß: Mazeppa; Aenderly Lebius: König Kasimir; Toni Zimmerer: Fürst Skrudzinski; Mi. Samoliows: Graf Czerny; Eva Speyer: Prinzessin Bianca; Lulu Lànyi: Gräfin Czerny; Otto Mannstaedt: Minister Krzywalow; Rudolf Hofbauer: Diener Jan; Max Gülstorff: Ukrainer Gutsbesitzer; Alfred Beierle: Schloßhauptmann Bulock; Berthold Reissig: Kosak Iwan; Frida von Bülow: Jans Schwester; Ernst Keppler: Pole Edelmann
- Release date: 1919
- Running time: 118 minutes
- Country: Germany

Mazeppa, der Volksheld der Ukraine (Mazeppa, the Folk Hero of Ukraine) is a historical film by German director Martin Berger, that was filmed in 1918 and released in July 1919.

== Plot ==
An historic drama about the Cossack Mazeppa, who at the end of the seventeenth century was a highly placed soldier under the Polish king Jan II Casimir. After a battle, Mazeppa is honoured by the king because of his great honour. A count who feels deprived, takes revenge.
