= Cutaneous lymphoid hyperplasia =

- Other names: Borrelial lymphocytoma, lymphadenosis benigna cutis, lymphocytoma cutis, pseudolymphoma, pseudolymphoma of Spiegler and Fendt, sarcoidosis of Spiegler and Fendt, Spiegler–Fendt lymphoid hyperplasia, Spiegler–Fendt sarcoid
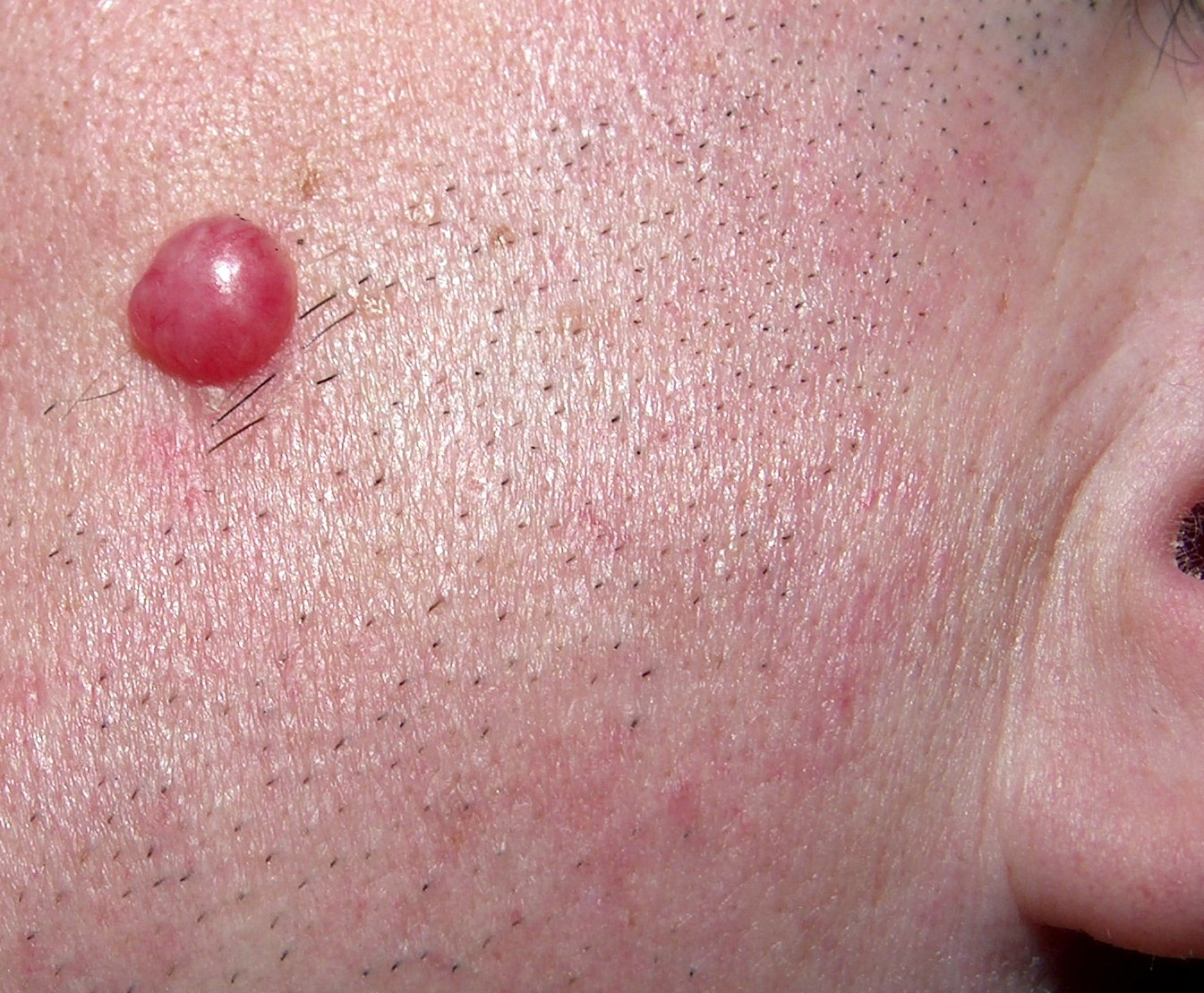
- Borrelial lymphocytoma on the cheek
- Specialty: Dermatology
- Frequency: 0.0001%

Cutaneous lymphoid hyperplasia refers to a groups of benign cutaneous disorders characterized by collections of lymphocytes, macrophages, and dendritic cells in the skin. Conditions included in this groups are:

- Cutaneous lymphoid hyperplasia with nodular pattern, a condition of the skin characterized by a solitary or localized cluster of asymptomatic erythematous to violaceous papules or nodules
- Cutaneous lymphoid hyperplasia with bandlike and perivascular patterns, a condition of the skin characterized by skin lesions that clinically resemble mycosis fungoides

== Jessner lymphocytic infiltrate ==
Jessner lymphocytic infiltrate of the skin is a cutaneous condition characterized by a persistent papular and plaque-like skin eruption which can occur on the neck, face and back and may re-occur. This is an uncommon skin disease and is a benign collection of lymph cells. Its cause is not known and can be hereditary. It is named for Max Jessner. It is thought to be equivalent to lupus erythematosus tumidus.

It can occur as the result of ACE inhibitors and a number of medications used to treat multiple sclerosis including glatiramer acetate.

== See also ==
- Lyme disease
- Skin lesion
- Tick bite
