= The Golden Plague (1921 film) =

1921 German film

- Directed by: Louis Ralph; Richard Oswald
- Written by: Øvre Richter Frich (novel); Paul Merzbach
- Produced by: Richard Oswald
- Starring: Louis Ralph; Anita Berber; Paul Bildt
- Cinematography: Willy Goldberger
- Production company: Richard-Oswald-Produktion
- Distributed by: National Film
- Release date: 18 November 1921
- Country: Germany
- Languages: Silent; German intertitles

The Golden Plague (German: Die goldene Pest) is a 1921 German silent thriller film directed by Louis Ralph and Richard Oswald and starring Louis Ralph, Anita Berber and Paul Bildt. An anarchist attempts to use a formula for artificial gold as part of a plan to flood the world market, causing an international crisis.

The film's sets were designed by the art director Botho Hoefer and István Szirontai Lhotka.

== Cast ==
- Louis Ralph as Jacques Delma
- Anita Berber as Natascha
- Paul Bildt as John Marker (chemistry student)
- Hans Adalbert Schlettow as Dr. Jonas Fjeld
- Emil Wittig as Brocke
- Felix Norfolk as Bradley
- Arthur Bergen as Bokine
- Hans Wallner as Croft
- Rudolf Klein-Rhoden as Faber
- Michael Rainer-Steiner as Lord Cavendish (president, Bank of England)
- Karl Martell as Patrick Murphy (Cavendish's secretary)
- Fred Berger as Det. James Clifford
- Emil Stammer as Det. Hansen
- Hermann Picha as Det. Ohlsen
- Curt Cappi as Det. Binet

== Bibliography ==
- Barbara Hales, Mihaela Petrescu and Valerie Weinstein. Continuity and Crisis in German Cinema, 1928-1936. Boydell & Brewer, 2016.
