= Fritz Delius (actor) =

German actor (1890–1966)

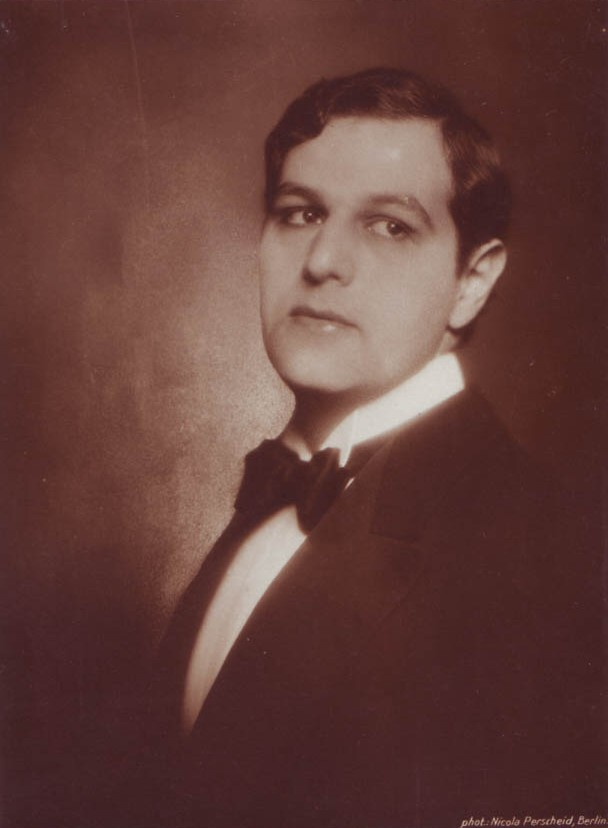
- Photograph of Delius taken in 1920
- Born: Friedrich Wilhelm Diamant; 28 September 1890; Berlin, Germany
- Died: 20 September 1966 (aged 75); Basel, Switzerland
- Occupation: Actor

Fritz Delius (28 September 1890 – 20 September 1966) was a German film actor and theater artist. He played leading parts opposite Henny Porten and Fern Andra in several silent films. After the advent of talkies he shifted his focus to theater. When Adolf Hitler came to power and several restrictions began to be imposed on Jews, Delius emigrated to Switzerland where he continued his theater and film career.

== Biography ==
The actor Fritz Delius was born on 28 September 1890 as Friedrich Wilhelm Diamant in Berlin. He made his theater debut in 1909 at the Meiningen Court Theatre and later acted frequently at the Reinhardt theaters in Berlin and Vienna. When the production of silent films began during the First World War, Delius started his film acting career. He played the leading actor opposite actress Henny Porten in several films. Some of his early films include Das große Schweigen (1915), Ihr bester Schuß (1916), Der Gefangene von Dahomey (1917). Fern Andra was another actress opposite whom he starred in several films. He was also credit as writer of two films Abseits vom Glück and Der Ruf der Liebe (both 1916). He also acted in the 1930 Spanish language film Dona Mentiras.

Some of his successful films include Auri sacra fames/Der verfluchte Hunger nach Gold (1920), Katharina die Grosse (1920), Lotte Lore (1921), Deutsche Helden in schwerer Zeit (1924) and Der Turm des Schweigens (1925). He also starred in the silent film The Women House of Brescia. It was rejected by the British Board of Film Classification. After talkies began to be produced in Germany he acted in only one film Seine Freundin Annette (1930). In the historical films Am Liebeshof des Sonnenkönigs (1920) and Louise de Lavallière (1922), Delius played King Louis XIV of France. In the 1920s Delius turned more to the theater and then worked for many years with the Theater in Der Josefstadt in Vienna. He later received an engagement at the Comedy in Basel. In 1938, because of his Jewish origin he left Germany and moved to Switzerland where he continued his theater and film career. He died on 20 September 1966 in Basel.

== Selected filmography ==
- The Prisoner of Dahomey (1918)
- Catherine the Great (1920)
- The Women House of Brescia (1920)
- Lotte Lore (1921)
- Louise de Lavallière (1922)
- Seine Freundin Annette (1931)
- Madness Rules (1949)
