= Eduard von Winterstein =

Austrian actor (1871–1961)

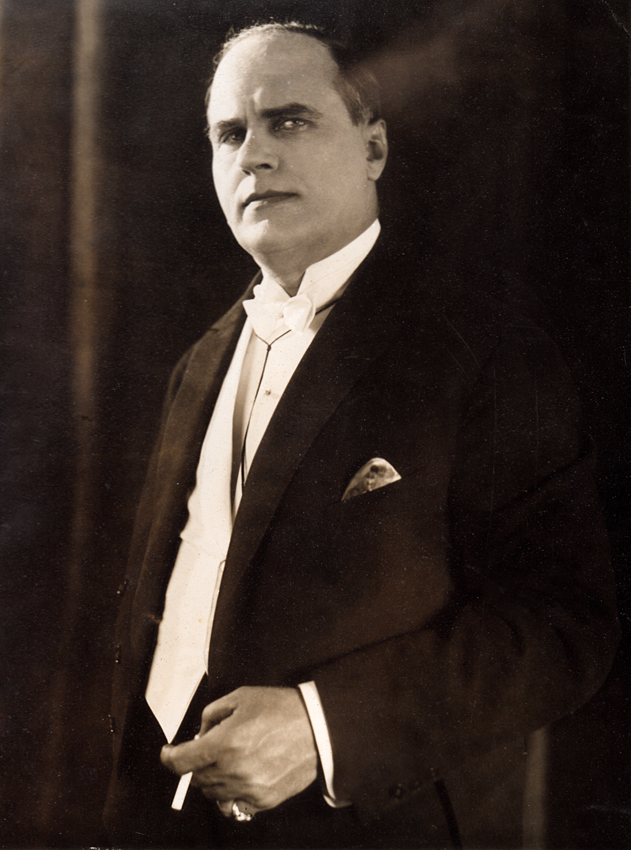
- Born: 1 August 1871; Vienna, Austria-Hungary
- Died: 22 July 1961 (aged 89); East Berlin, East Germany
- Years active: 1919–1958
- Spouse(s): Minna Menger, m. (1894)
- Children: Gustav von Wangenheim

Eduard Clemens Franz Anna Freiherr von Wangenheim (1 August 1871 – 22 July 1961), known as Eduard von Winterstein, was an Austrian-German film actor who appeared in over one hundred fifty German films during the silent and sound eras. He was also a noted theater actor.

== Biography ==
Von Winterstein was born in Vienna on 1 August 1871 to landowner Hugo von Wangenheim and his second wife, Hungarian-born actress Aloysia "Luise" von Wangenheim-Dub. His predecessors were the Barons of Wangenheim. He took acting lessons from his mother, who had played at the Burgtheater in Vienna. Winterstein came to Gera in 1889 and acted in theaters along with his mother and sister Clementine, where he had "undeservedly forgotten" experiences. He acted in the play Ersten Held und Liebhaber in 1893. The same year, he played the title role in Egmont at the opening of a theater in Annaberg on 2 April 1893. "I was re-born in Annaberg and became like a completely different person. In this small town I had really become an actor. [...] So the Anna Berger time was one of the best in my profession." he wrote in his autobiography. At this theater he met the actress Minna Menger, whom he married in 1894. They had a son, Gustav von Wangenheim (1895–1975), who went on to become an actor. The Theater in Annaberg-Buchholz is named Eduard von Winterstein Theater today.

From 1895, he played at the Schiller Theater which had signed him for a three-year contract and from 1898 at the Deutsches Theater in Berlin under Otto Brahm. He married Hedwig Pauly (1866–1965) in 1899. Next he worked at the Lessing theater and acted in Gorky's The Lower Depths at Max Reinhardt's Kleines Theater. Later he worked under Max Reinhardt. When he moved up Winterstein enthusiastically commented about the country with the following words:

Berlin! It was at that time much more than today, the long-awaited paradise, after each German actor strove with all their might... Here in the big city flourished a lively theater life. The theater almanac from 1895 lists twenty-four theaters for Berlin. [...] I had found temporary accommodation with relatives with my family in the Großbeerenstraße... I was happy that I was just in Berlin to debut in this role (as Tellheim in Minna von Barnhelm)."

He taught acting from 1905 to 1920 at a theater school founded by Max Reinhardt. From 1913, Winterstein also started acting in films. In the period after the Second World War, he worked with the ensemble of the Deutsches Theater. There he played the role of Nathan approximately four hundred times. He won the Best male actor award at the Film Festival in Karlovy Vary for his portrayal of the title role in The Sonnenbrucks (1951). He soon became a popular German film actor and was cast to play the roles of energetic elders as generals, judges, landlords and directors. He won the national award thrice — for his acting in Georg C. Klaren-directed Semmelweis - Retter der Mütter (1950), Wolfgang Staudte-directed Der Untertan (film) (1951) and Martin Hellberg-directed Emilia Galotti (1958 film). Unlike the theater, however, Winterstein's appearances were limited in the film mostly on a few scenes. He appeared in 150 films and was the part of various intercom panel discussions, including even in old age the ring story from Nathan the Wise for the East German recording label Eterna. His last film was Der schweigende Stern (1960).

Winterstein deliberately chose a life in East Germany, a fact of which the country's cultural policy took advantage. After his death, Neues Deutschland gave him a special, with the title "The Better Choice". Its final passage reads:

I have experienced a lot of changes: under three emperors, the first world war, the pseudo-democracy of the Second Empire, the Weimar Republic, the terrible twelve years of National Socialism and that induced the complete collapse of the German Empire, until I take sigh of relief from free will and will join the new progressive spirit and am now proud to call a citizen of the German Democratic Republic and this is insight and reason for choosing the better.

A street in Potsdam is named in his honour.

== Selected filmography ==
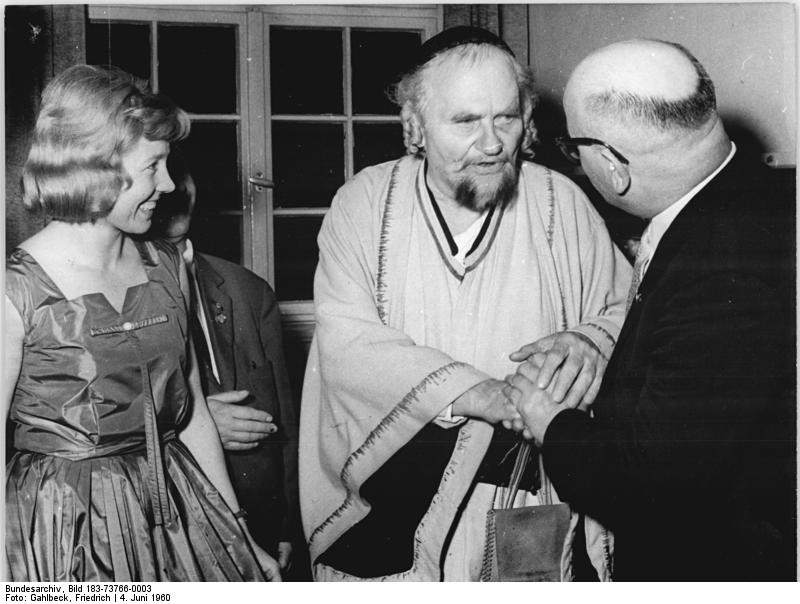
Eduard von Winterstein (center) as Nathan The Wise, 1960

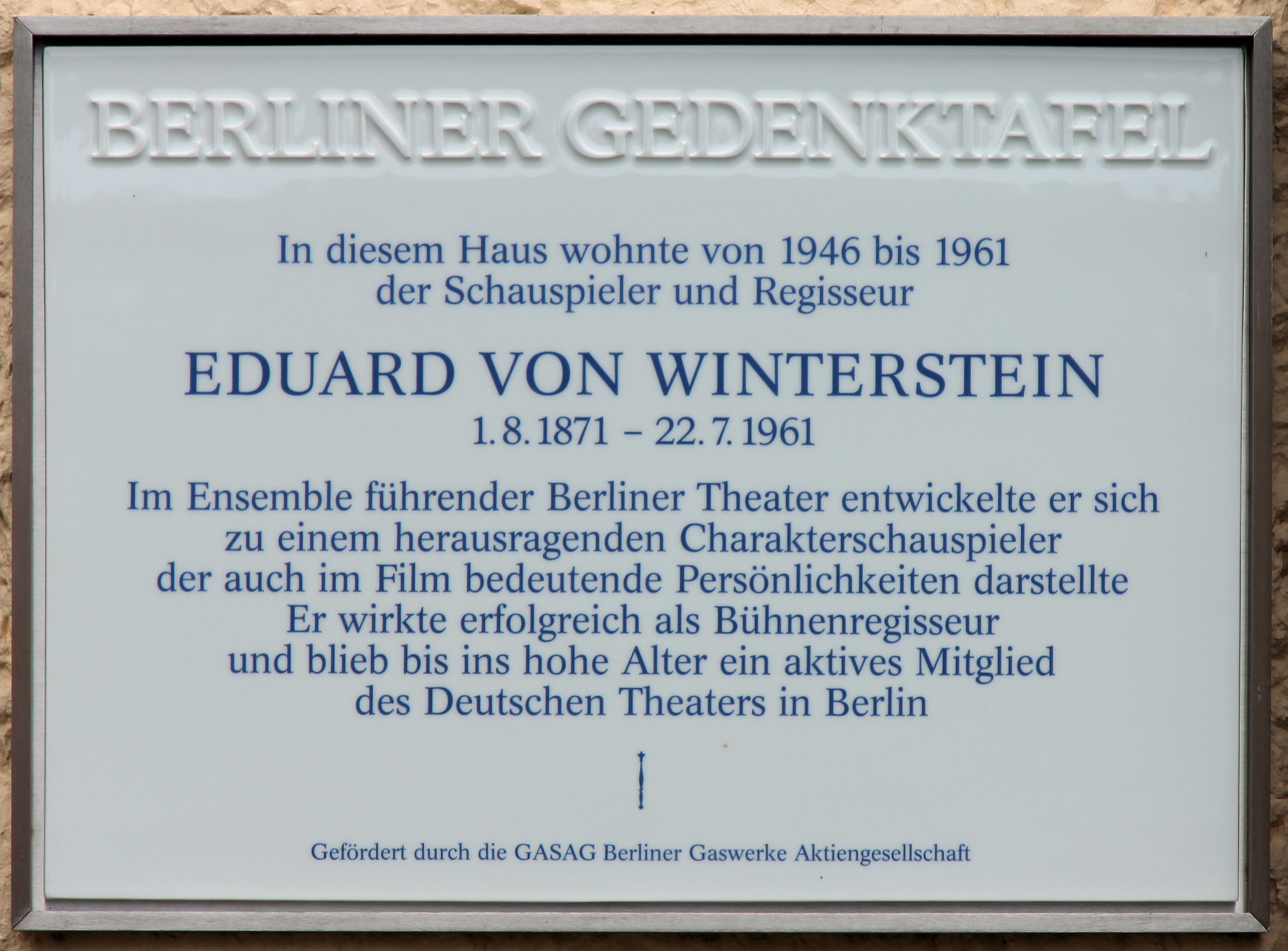
Memorial plaque in Berlin

- Werner Krafft (1916) as Werner Krafft
- The Giant's Fist (1917) as Diether von Brake
- The Coquette (1917)
- Prostitution (1919)
- The Mask (1919) as Count Campobello
- Blonde Poison (1919) as Chauffeur
- During My Apprenticeship (1919)
- The Monastery of Sendomir (1919)
- Irrlicht (1919)
- Madeleine (1919)
- President Barrada (1920)
- Battle of the Sexes (1920)
- Mary Tudor (1920) as Simon Renard
- The Yellow Death (1920) as Officer Karpuschkin
- Figaros Hochzeit (1920)
- Intrigue (1920) as Der Gatte
- Mary Magdalene (1920) as Master Anton
- Hamlet (1921) as King Claudius
- Lady Godiva (1921) as the duke
- Danton (1921) as General Westermann
- The Devil and Circe (1921)
- The White Death (1921) as the father
- The Stranger from Alster Street (1921)
- The Adventuress of Monte Carlo (1921) as Rimay
- The False Dimitri (1922) as Boyard Bielsky
- The Diadem of the Czarina (1922)
- The Fire Ship (1922)
- Bigamy (1922)
- The Strumpet's Plaything (1922)
- The White Desert (1922) as Iwan
- Circus People (1922)
- The Stream (1922)
- Fridericus Rex (1922) as Leopold I, Prince of Anhalt-Dessau
- Gold and Luck (1923) as Bauer
- William Tell (1923) as Werner Stauffacher
- The Treasure of Gesine Jacobsen (1923) as Doctor Holgersen
- The Path to God (1924) as Thomas Balt
- Guillotine (1924) as Prosecutor Laroche
- The Little Duke (1924) as Commandant von Trucschicz
- Garragan (1924)
- Claire (1924)
- A Free People (1925) as Administrator von Nehling
- What the Stones Tell (1925) as General Wrangel
- People in Need (1925) as General Samsonov
- Goetz von Berlichingen of the Iron Hand (1925)
- Ash Wednesday (1925) as the commander
- Destiny (1925) as Minister von Glayn
- Wallenstein (1925) as Terzky
- The Mill at Sanssouci (1926) as Leopold I, Prince of Anhalt-Dessau
- Fedora (1926)
- The Woman in Gold (1926)
- Women of Passion (1926)
- The Adventurers (1926) as Karl Lüttgen
- The Fallen (1926) as the magistrate
- I Liked Kissing Women (1926) as Franz Hartwig
- The House of Lies (1926) as Dr. Helling
- The Bohemian Dancer (1926) as Gamekeeper Lange
- The Master of Death (1926) as Colonel von Hersdorff
- The Good Reputation (1926)
- Mademoiselle Josette, My Woman (1926)
- Lützow's Wild Hunt (1927) as Gebhard Leberecht von Blücher
- Tragedy of a Marriage (1927)
- The Pink Slippers (1927) as the head gamekeeper
- A Girl of the People (1927) as General Laudon
- On the Banks of the River Weser (1927)
- That Was Heidelberg on Summer Nights (1927) as Lord Wagner
- Prinz Louis Ferdinand (1927) as Scharnhorst
- A Day of Roses in August (1927) as Major von Rudow
- The Mysterious Mirror (1928) as the lord
- Master and Mistress (1928)
- Napoleon at St. Helena (1929) as Gebhard Leberecht von Blücher
- The Blue Angel (1930) as the school's director
- The Other (1930) as Dr. Koehler
- Darling of the Gods (1930) as Dr. Marberg
- Him or Me (1930) as R.A. Wilken
- Love's Carnival (1930) as Commandant von Friese
- Road to Rio (1931) as the police commissioner
- In the Employ of the Secret Service (1931) as the spy's chief
- Between Night and Dawn (1931) as the father
- The Song of Life (1931) Guest at Engagement Party
- Sacred Waters (1932) as Peter Waldisch
- Trenck (1932) as Wilhelm Heinrich Freiherr von der Goltz
- The White Demon (1932) as the Marquis d'Esquillon
- The First Right of the Child (1932)
- Secret Agent (1932) as Professor Managan
- Man Without a Name (1932) as the judge
- Frederica (1933) as Capitain Knebel
- Spies at Work (1933) as Commandant von Waldmüller
- The Roberts Case (1933) as Burgomaster Bergmann
- The Judas of Tyrol (1933) as Kreutzwirt
- At the Strasbourg (1934) as Jacob Rusti
- The Rider on the White Horse (1934) as the mayor
- The Last Waltz (1934) as General Dymoff
- The Higher Command (1935) as Major
- Regine (1935) as Keller
- His Late Excellency (1935) as Count Seefeld
- The Girl from the Marsh Croft (1935) as Mr. Gerhart
- Hundred Days (1935) as Blücher
- Streak of Steel (1935) as Der Notar
- The Schimeck Family (1935)
- Trouble Backstairs (1935) as Judge Muller
- Martha (1936)
- Ninety Minute Stopover (1936)
- Martha (1936)
- Winter in the Woods (1936) as the gamekeeper
- Der Etappenhase (1937) as Major Grothe
- Madame Bovary (1937) as Huret
- The Man Who Was Sherlock Holmes (1937) as the supreme judge
- The Coral Princess (1937) as Vukowitsch
- Serenade (1937) as the doctor
- The Marriage Swindler (1938) as Franz Buschko
- The Man Who Couldn't Say No (1938)
- Napoleon Is to Blame for Everything (1938) as Mister Harrison
- A Prussian Love Story (1938) as General von Gneisenau
- The Green Emperor (1939) as the second judge
- Liberated Hands (1939) as Lord von Erken
- Robert Koch (1939) as Prof. Ernst von Bergmann
- D III 88 (1939) as Landarzt
- The Journey to Tilsit (1939) as Erwin Bohrmann
- In the Name of the People (1939)
- The Immortal Heart (1939)
- Stars of Variety (1939)
- The Golden Mask (1939)
- The Merciful Lie (1939)
- Das Herz der Königin (1940) as the English general
- The Girl from Barnhelm (1940)
- Bismarck (1940) as General von Manstein
- Kopf hoch, Johannes! (1941)
- Annelie (1941)
- Ohm Krüger (1941) as Commandant Cronje
- Andreas Schlüter (1942) as Naumann
- Rembrandt (1942) as Ratsherr van Straaten
- My Summer Companion (1943) as Angelikas Vater
- Münchhausen (1943) as Munchausen's father
- When the Young Wine Blossoms (1943)
- Philharmonic (1944)
- Hoegler's Mission (1950)
- The Sonnenbrucks (1951)
- Der Untertan (1951)
- Das Lied der Matrosen (1958)
- First Spaceship on Venus (1959) as the nuclear physicist
