= Ludwig Trautmann =

German actor

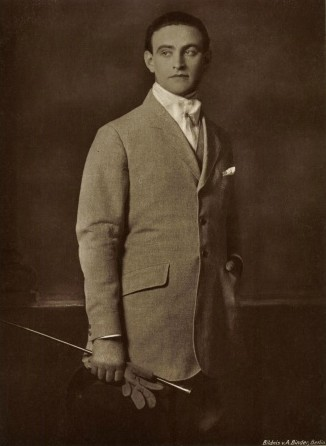
- Born: 22 November 1885; Dachsbach, German Empire
- Died: 24 January 1957 (aged 71); West Berlin, West Germany
- Occupation: Actor
- Years active: 1912–1953

Ludwig Trautmann (22 November 1885 – 24 January 1957) was a German stage and film actor. He appeared in more than 60 films between 1912 and 1953.

From July 13 to October 12, 1935, he was imprisoned in the Columbia concentration camp and the Lichtenburg concentration camp near Torgau for homosexual acts on the basis of § 175, followed by his expulsion from the Reich Theater Chamber and the Reich Film Chamber. He was a member of the jury at the 1st Berlin International Film Festival.

== Selected filmography ==
- The Priest from Kirchfeld (1914)
- The Brown Beast (1914)
- The ABC of Love (1916)
- The Marriage of Luise Rohrbach (1917)
- Ferdinand Lassalle (1918)
- The Lodging House for Gentleman (1922)
- The Eleven Schill Officers (1932)
- Trenck (1932)
- Theodor Körner (1932)
- The Hymn of Leuthen (1933)
- Today Is the Day (1933)
