= List of compositions by Franz Schubert (1822) =

Franz Schubert's compositions of 1822 are mostly in the Deutsch catalogue (D) range D 733–767, and include:

- Instrumental works:
  - Symphony No. 8, D 759, a.k.a. Unfinished Symphony
  - Wanderer Fantasy, D 760
  - Three Marches militaires, D 733
- Vocal music:
  - "Willkommen und Abschied", D 767

== Table ==
=== Legend ===
Legend to the table
column		content
1	D '51	Deutsch number in the first version of the Deutsch catalogue (1951)
2	D utd	most recent (utd = up to date) Deutsch catalogue number; the basic collation of the list is according to these numbers – whether or not the possibility to adjust the sorting according to the content of other columns is available depends on the device with which the table is displayed.
3	Op. pbl	Opus number (Op.; p indicates Post. = posthumous) and date of first publication (pbl; between brackets; when there is more than one date the earlier dates indicate partial publications). The column sorts to Opus number, then (earliest of) the publication date(s)
4	AGA	Alte Gesamt-Ausgabe = Franz Schubert's Werke: Kritisch durchgesehene Gesammtausgabe. Indicates genre/instrumentation: Series I: Symphonien (Nos. 1-8) (Johannes Brahms, 1884); Series II: Overtüren und Andere Orchesterwerke (Johann Nepomuk Fuchs, 1886); Series III: Oktette (Nos. 1-3) and IV: Streichquintett (Eusebius Mandyczewski, 1889); Series V: Streichquartette (Nos. 1-15) (Joseph Hellmesberger and Eusebius Mandyczewski, 1890); Series VI: Trio für Streichinstrumente (Eusebius Mandyczewski, 1892); Series VII: Trios, Quartets and Quintets with Piano and VIII: Pianoforte und Ein Instrument (Ignaz Brüll, 1886); Series IX: Pianoforte zu vier Händen (Anton Door, 1888); Series X: Sonaten für Pianoforte (Julius Epstein, 1888); Series XI: Fantasie, Impromptus und andere Stücke für Pianoforte (Julius Epstein, 1888); Series XII: Tänze für Pianoforte (Nos. 1-31) (Julius Epstein, 1889); Series XIII: Messen (Nos. 1-7) (Eusebius Mandyczewski, 1887); Series XIV: Kleinere Kirchenmusikwerke (Nos. 1-22) (Eusebius Mandyczewski, 1888); Series XV: Dramatische Musik (Johann Nepomuk Fuchs, 1893); Series XVI: Werke für Männerchor (Nos. 1-46) (Eusebius Mandyczewski, 1891); Series XVII: Werke für gemischten Chor (Nos. 1-19) (Josef Gänsbacher, Eusebius Mandyczewski, 1892); Series XVIII: Werke für Drei und mehr Frauenstimmen mit Pianoforte-Begleitung (Nos. 1-6) (Josef Gänsbacher, Eusebius Mandyczewski, 1891); Series XIX: Kleine Gesangswerke (Nos. 1-36) (Josef Gänsbacher and Eusebius Mandyczewski, 1892); Series XX: Sämtliche einstimmige Lieder und Gesänge (Eusebius Mandyczewski, 1894-1895); Series XXI: Supplement (Eusebius Mandyczewski, 1897); 1. Instrumentalmusik No. 1-5; 2. Instrumentalmusik No. 6-13; 3. Instrumentalmusik No. 14-; 4. Gesangsmusik; Series XXII: Revisionsbericht
5	NSA	NGA/NSA/NSE = New Schubert Edition, also indicates genre/instrumentation: Series I: Church Music; Series II: Stage Works; Series III: Part Songs; Series IV: Lieder; Series V: Orchestral Works; Series VI: Chamber Music; 1. Octet and Nonet; 2. String Quintet; 3. String Quartets I; 4. String Quartets II; 5. String Quartets III; 6. String Trios; 7. Works for Piano and several instruments; 8. Works for Piano and one instrument; 9. Dances for several instruments; Series VII: Piano Music; 1. Works for Piano Four Hands; 2. Works for Piano Two Hands; Series VIII: Supplement, 2. Schubert's Studies
6	Name	unique name, with, if available, a link to the relevant encyclopedia article; sorts by name with initial definite ("Der", "Die", "Das", ...) or indefinite ("Ein", "A", ...) articles, and numbers, moved after the expression they qualify: e.g. "Die Hoffnung, ..." sorts as "Hoffnung, Die, ..." – "Thirty Minuets ..." sorts as "Minuets, 30, ...".
7	Key / incipit	incipit mostly for songs (linking to lyrics and their translation, for instance at The LiederNet Archive, when available), other compositions by key, except for Schubert's stage works: type of composition in brackets.
8	Date	(presumed) date of composition, or, for copies and arrangements, date of Schubert's autograph. Sorts to earliest possible date of completion, unlike the chronology of the Deutsch catalogue that generally collates according to earliest date associated with the composition: e.g. Schubert started the composition of his 3rd String Quartet on 19 November 1812 and completed it on 21 February 1813 – in the Deutsch catalogue the composition is grouped with other compositions from 1812: when using the sort function of the 8th column the composition is grouped with compositions completed in 1813
9	Additional info	may include: Information about the text (lyrics, libretto) of vocal compositions: e.g., "Text by [text author]", "Text: [standard lyrics]", "... from [literary work]"; "other settings: D ..." indicates Schubert's other settings of the same text; for fields starting with "Text ..." this column sorts by text author (last name, first name—or pen name when such name is more established), then incipit of the lyrics (alternatively, when the incipit is rarely used, title of the work); Information about the authenticity of the composition: the work is without doubt Schubert's unless when marked as "Doubtful", "Spurious?" or "Spurious" (in the last case columns 3–8 give no further information about the composition); Forces needed for performance ("For ..."): may be omitted when the type of composition makes the instrumentation clear (e.g. String Quartet → two violins, viola and cello), and, for vocal music, when the setting is for voice and piano; "s", "a", "t" and "b" refer to a single soprano, alto, tenor and bass singer respectively, while "S", "A", "T" and "B" to choral parts for the same types of singers (see SATB).; Specifications regarding movements (e.g. "Allegro – Minuet – Rondo") or sections (e.g. "No. 1 ..."); Information about the completeness of the extant work: the work is considered complete as extant unless when marked "Sketch", "Incomplete", "Unfinished", "Fragment" or "Lost"; Information about versions (e.g. "Two versions: ...")

=== List ===
Compositions by Franz Schubert listed in the Deutsch catalogue for 1822
D '51	D utd	Op. pbl	AGA	NSA	Name	Key / incipit	Date	Additional info
733	733	51 (1826)	IX, 1 No. 3	VII/1, 4	Trois Marches militaires	D major G major E♭ major	Summer– Autumn; 1818?	For piano duet
734	734	67 (1826)	XII; No. 5	VII/2, 7a	16 Ländler and 2 Écossaises, a.k.a. Wiener Damen-Ländler	Various keys	before 15/12/1826	For piano
735	735	49 (1825)	XII; No. 23	VII/2, 7a	Galop and Eight Écossaises	Various keys	before 21/11/1825	For piano
736	736	(1842)	XX, 7 No. 402	IV, 13	Ihr Grab	Dort ist ihr Grab	1822?	Text by Engelhardt (a.k.a. Richard Roos)
737	737	56,2 (1826)	XX, 7 No. 414	IV, 3	An die Leier	Ich will von Atreus Söhnen	1822 or 1823?	Text by Bruchmann translating Anacreon
738	738	56,3 (1826)	XX, 7 No. 415	IV, 3	Im Haine	Sonnenstrahlen durch die Tannen	1822 or 1823?	Text by Bruchmann
739	739	45 (1825)	XIV No. 6	I, 9 No. 5	Tantum ergo, D 739	C major	1814	Text by Aquinas (other settings: D 460, 461, 730, 750, 962 and Anh. I/17); For SATB and orchestra
740	740	16,1 (1823)	XVI; No. 7	III, 3 No. 28; Anh. III No. 3 Anh. IV No. 6	Frühlingsgesang, D 740	Schmücket die Locken mit duftigen Kränzen	January– early April; 1822	Text by Schober (other setting, of which the music is partly reused in this setting: D 709); For ttbb and piano
741	741	20,1 (1823)	XX, 6 No. 400	IV, 1a	Sei mir gegrüßt	O du Entriß'ne mir	late 1821– autumn 1822	Text by Rückert
742	742	68 (1822)	XX, 7 No. 401	IV, 3	Der Wachtelschlag	Ach! mir schallt's dorten so lieblich hervor	before 30/7/1822	Text by Sauter; Publ. as Op. 68 in 1827
743	743	23,2 (1823)	XX, 7 No. 406	IV, 2a	Selige Welt	Ich treibe auf des Lebens Meer	autumn 1822?	Text by Senn; For b and piano
744	744	23,3 (1823)	XX, 7 No. 407	IV, 2a	Schwanengesang, D 744	Wie klag' ich's aus das Sterbegefühl	autumn 1822?	Text by Senn
745	745	73 (1822) (1895)	XX, 7 No. 408	IV, 3	Die Rose	Es lockte schöne Wärme	1822	Text by Schlegel, F., from Abendröte I, 6; Two versions: 1st publ. as Op. 73 in 1827
746	746	(1831)	XX, 7 No. 422	IV, 13	Am See, D 746	In des Sees Wogenspiele	1822 or 1823?	Text by Bruchmann
747	747	11,3 (1822)	XVI; No. 6	III, 3 No. 29	Geist der Liebe, D 747	Der Abend schleiert Flur und Hain	January; 1822	Text by Matthisson (other setting: D 414); For ttbb and piano
748	748	157p (1822)	XVII; No. 3	III, 1	Am Geburtstage des Kaisers	Steig empor, umblüht von Segen	January; 1822	Text by Deinhardstein; For satbSATB and orchestra; Publ. with a modified text as Op. posth. 157 in 1849
749	749	(1850)	XX, 10; No. 588	IV, 13	Herrn Josef Spaun, Assessor in Linz	Und nimmer schreibst du?	January; 1822	Text by Collin, M. C.
750	750	(1888)	XIV No. 8	I, 9 No. 9	Tantum ergo, D 750	D major	22/3/1822	Text by Aquinas (other settings: D 460, 461, 730, 739, 962 and Anh. I/17); For SATB and orchestra
751	751	23,1 (1823)	XX, 7 No. 410	IV, 2a	Die Liebe hat gelogen	Die Liebe hat gelogen	before 17/4/1822	Text by Platen
752	752	(1872)	XX, 7 No. 403	IV, 13	Nachtviolen	Nachtviolen, Nachtviolen	April 1822	Text by Mayrhofer
753	753	65,3 (1826)	XX, 7 No. 404	IV, 3	Heliopolis I a.k.a. Aus Heliopolis	Im kalten, rauhen Norden	April 1822	Text by Mayrhofer
754	754	(1842)	XX, 7 No. 405	IV, 13	Heliopolis II a.k.a. Im Hochgebirge	Fels auf Felsen hingewälzet	April 1822	Text by Mayrhofer; For b and piano
755	755			I, 5 Anh.	Kyrie, D 755	A minor Kyrie	May 1822	Text: Mass ordinary (other settings: D 24E, 31, 45, 49, 56, 66, 105, 167, 324, 452, 678 and 950); For satbSATB, strings and organ; Sketch
756	756	59,1 (1826) (1895)	XX, 7 No. 409	IV, 3	Du liebst mich nicht	Mein Herz ist zerrissen, du liebst mich nicht!	July 1822	Text by Platen; Two versions: 2nd is Op. 59 No. 1
757	757	133p (1839)	XVIII; No. 3	III, 3 No. 30; Anh. III No. 4	Gott in der Natur	Groß ist der Herr!	August; 1822	Text by Kleist; For ssaa and piano
	757A			VII/2, 4	March, D 757A	B minor	1822	For piano
758	758	108,2 (1829)	XX, 7 No. 411	IV, 5	Todesmusik	In des Todes Feierstunde	September; 1822	Text by Schober; Two versions: 2nd is Op. 108 No. 2
759	759	(1867)	I, 2 No. 8 XXII v1	V, 3 No. 7	Symphony No. 8, a.k.a. Unfinished Symphony	B minor	30/10/1822	Allegro moderato – Andante con moto – Scherzo (Fragment); D 797 No. 1 may be its 4th movement
732 (Ov.)	759A	69 (1839)		VII/2, 4	Overture to Alfonso und Estrella, D 759A	D major	November; 1822	For piano; Arranged from D 732 (see also: D 773)
760	760	15 (1823)	XI No. 1	VII/2, 5	Fantasy, D 760, a.k.a. Wanderer Fantasy	C major	November; 1822	For piano; Reuses music of D 489
761	761	23,4 (1823) (1795)	XX, 7 No. 412	IV, 2a & b No. 1	Schatzgräbers Begehr	In tiefster Erde ruht ein alt Gesetz	November; 1822	Text by Schober; Two versions: 2nd is Op. 23 No. 4
762	762	(1833)	XX, 7 No. 413	IV, 13	Schwestergruß	Im Mondenschein' wall' ich auf und ab	November; 1822	Text by Bruchmann
763	763	146p (1842)	XVII; No. 11	III, 2a No. 13	Des Tages Weihe	Schicksalslenker, blicke nieder	22/11/1822	For satb and piano
764	764	92,1 (1828) (1895)	XX, 7 No. 416	IV, 5	Der Musensohn	Durch Feld und Wald zu schweifen	early Dec. 1822	Text by Goethe; Two versions: 2nd is Op. 92 No. 1
765	765	(1868)	XX, 7 No. 417	IV, 13	An die Entfernte	So hab' ich wirklich dich verloren?	early Dec. 1822	Text by Goethe
766	766	(1872)	XX, 7 No. 418	IV, 13	Am Flusse, D 766	Verfließet, vielgeliebte Lieder	early Dec. 1822	Text by Goethe (other setting: D 160)
767	767	56,1 (1826) (1895)	XX, 7 No. 419	IV, 3	Willkommen und Abschied	Es schlug mein Herz	early Dec. 1822	Text by Goethe; Two versions: 2nd is Op. 56 No. 1

== Sources ==
Multi-volume editions, websites and catalogues

- Alte Gesamt-Ausgabe (AGA) = Franz Schubert's Works: Schubert, Franz (1884–1897). Johannes Brahms; Ignaz Brüll; Anton Door; Julius Epstein; Johann Nepomuk Fuchs; Josef Gänsbacher; Joseph Hellmesberger Sr.; Eusebius Mandyczewski (eds.). Franz Schubert's Werke: Kritisch durchgesehene Gesammtausgabe (in German). Leipzig: Breitkopf & Härtel. Reprints of several volumes by Kalmus and Dover Publications; Franz Schubert's Werke (Series I–XIX and XXI), Series XX, Revisionsbericht: Scores at the International Music Score Library Project
- Deutsch catalogue (D) = Schubert Thematic Catalogue:
  - Deutsch, Otto Erich; et al. (Donald R. Wakeling) (1951). Schubert: Thematic Catalogue of all his Works in Chronological Order (1st ed.). London: Dent. 1995 reprint, with errata correction: Deutsch, Otto Erich; et al. (Donald R. Wakeling) (1995). The Schubert Thematic Catalogue (Dover ed.). Mineola, N.Y.: Dover Publications. ISBN 0486286851.
  - Deutsch, Otto Erich (1978). Walther Dürr; Arnold Feil; Christa Landon [in German]; Werner Aderhold (eds.). Franz Schubert: Thematisches Verzeichnis seiner Werke in chronologischer Folge. New Schubert Edition (in German). Kassel: Bärenreiter. ISBN 9783761805718. ISMN 9790006305148.
    - Series VIII (Supplement)
    - Volume 4
- Hoboken catalogue (Hob.): "Joseph Haydn (1732–1809): Werke sortiert nach Hob (Hoboken-Verzeichnis, 1957-78)" (in German). Kaiserslautern: Klassika.
- Köchel catalogue (K.): "Wolfgang Amadeus Mozart (1756–1791): Werke sortiert nach KV^{6} (Köchel-Verzeichnis, 6. Auflage, 1964)" (in German). Kaiserslautern: Klassika.
- Neue Schubert-Ausgabe (NSA) = New Schubert Edition:
  - NSA scores: Schubert, Franz (1968–2019). International Schubert Association (Tübingen) (ed.). Franz Schubert (1797–1828): New Edition of the Complete Works (in German). Kassel: Bärenreiter. [over 80 volumes in eight series] Individual volumes:
    - NSA II, 15: Schubert, Franz; Neumann, Johann Philipp (2008). Jahrmärker, Manuela; Aigner, Thomas (eds.). Sacontala. New Schubert Edition (in German). Kassel: Bärenreiter. ISMN 9790006497294.
      - Series II (Stage Works), Vol. 15
    - NSA VIII, 4: See above Deutsch (1978)
  - NSA website: "New Schubert Edition". Tübingen: International Schubert Association.
- Schubert Online: "www.schubert-online.at: Schubert music manuscripts, first and early editions online". Vienna: Austrian Academy of Sciences (ÖAW).
- The LiederNet Archive: Ezust, Emily; et al. (LiederNet contributors). "Composer: Franz Peter Schubert (1797 - 1828)". Ontario: LiederNet Corporation.

Other

- Badura-Skoda, Eva; Branscombe, Peter, eds. (2008). Schubert Studies: Problems of Style and Chronology. Cambridge University Press. ISBN 0521088720.
  - Walther Dürr "Schubert's Songs and Their Poetry" pp. 1–24
  - Rufus Hallmark "Schubert's 'Auf dem Strom'" pp. 25–46
  - Elaine Brody "Schubert and Sulzer Revisited" pp. 47–60
  - Marius Flothuis "Schubert Revises Schubert" pp. 61–84
  - Elizabeth Norman McKay "Schubert as Composer of Operas" pp. 85–104
  - Peter Branscombe "Schubert and the Melodrama" pp. 105–142
  - Christoph Wolff "Schubert's 'Der Tod und dad Mädchen'" pp. 143–172
  - Peter Gülke on String Quintet D 956 pp. 173–186
  - Paul Badura-Skoda on Schubert's 'Great' C major Symphony pp. 187–208
  - Robert Winter "Paper Studies and the Future of Schubert Research" pp. 209–276
  - Eva Badura-Skoda "The Chronology of Schubert's Piano Trios" pp. 277–296
  - Reinhard Van Hoorickx "The Chronology of Schubert's Fragments and Sketches" pp. 297–326
  - Arnold Feil "Rhythm in Schubert" pp. 327–346
  - Alexander Weinmann on Leopold Puschl and Schubert's sojourn in Zseliz pp. 347–356
- Elsholz, Gunter (1982). Vogel, Reimut (ed.). Franz Schubert: Sinfonie in E-Dur 1825. Stuttgart: Goldoni. ISBN 3922044050. OCLC 987719669.
- Hilmar, Ernst; Jestremski, Margret, eds. (2004). Schubert-Enzyklopädie (in German). Vol. 1. Introduction by Alfred Brendel. Tutzing: Hans Schneider. ISBN 3795211557.
- Keefe, Simon P., ed. (2006). Mozart Studies. Cambridge University Press. ISBN 0521851025.
- Kube, Michael (2009). "Franz Schuberts Deutsche Trauermesse (D 621) als Problem der Text- und Stilkritik". In Mitterauer, Gertraud; Müller, Ulrich; Springeth, Margarete; Vitzthum, Verena (eds.). Was ist Textkritik?: Zur Geschichte und Relevanz eines Zentralbegriffs der Editionswissenschaft (in German). Walter de Gruyter. pp. 129–140. ISBN 3484970782.
- Mozart, Wolfgang Amadeus; Haydn, Joseph; Haydn, Michael (2008). Kircher, Armin (ed.). Chorbuch Mozart • Haydn VII: Kanonsammlung [Choral Collection Mozart • Haydn, Vol. VII: Canon Collection] (in German, Latin, English, and Italian). Stuttgart: Carus-Verlag. OCLC 274222567.
- Newbould, Brian (1999). Schubert: The Music and the Man. University of California Press. ISBN 0520219570.
- Reed, John (1997). The Schubert Song Companion. Manchester University Press. ISBN 1901341003.
- Van Hoorickx, Reinhard (1971). "Franz Schubert (1797–1828) List of the Dances in Chronological Order". Revue belge de Musicologie / Belgisch Tijdschrift voor Muziekwetenschap. 25 (1). Belgian Musicological Society: 68–97. doi:10.2307/3686180. ISSN 0771-6788. JSTOR 3686180.
- Van Hoorickx, Reinhard (1974–1976). "Thematic Catalogue of Schubert's Works: New Additions, Corrections and Notes". Revue belge de Musicologie / Belgisch Tijdschrift voor Muziekwetenschap. 28–30. Belgian Musicological Society: 136–171. doi:10.2307/3686053. ISSN 0771-6788. JSTOR 3686053.
