= Maria Becker =

German actress and director (1920–2012)

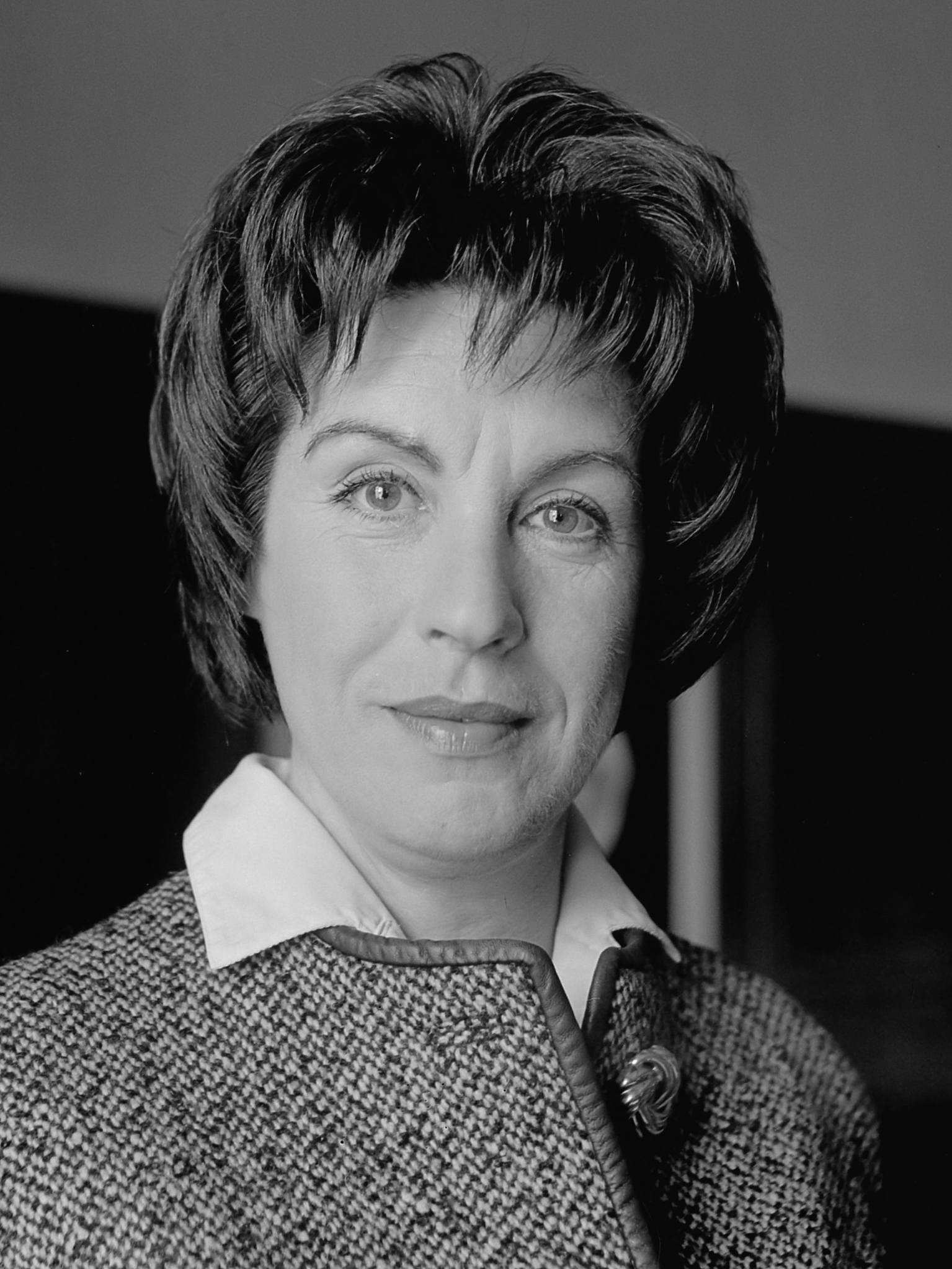
Becker in 1963

Maria Becker (28 January 1920 – 5 September 2012) was a German actress and director.

== Life and career ==
Becker was born on 28 January 1920, in Berlin, the daughter of Theodor Becker and Maria Fein. After their divorce, she lived with her mother in Berlin. From 1930, she visited the Kleist-Lyzeum in Berlin and the Schule am Meer on Juist, an island in Lower Saxony. After the National Socialists seized power in 1936, her mother, who was no longer allowed to perform at the Deutsches Theater because she was Jewish, took her to Vienna, Austria in 1936. There, Becker visited the Max Reinhardt Seminar, a drama school. After the Anschluss happened in 1938, she and her mother fled to Zürich, where she joined the Schauspielhaus Zürich. She worked there until 1965 with interruptions.

After the end of World War II, Becker had many engagements, including in Vienna, Salzburg, Berlin and Hamburg. She founded the "Schauspieltruppe Zürich" in 1956 with Robert Freitag and Will Quadflieg, and contributed to many TV films and series.

Becker was a member of the Academy of Arts in West Berlin from 1975 to 1993 and from 1993 to 2021 after the reunification of formerly separate East and West Berlin academies.

== Personal life ==
From 1945 to 1966, she was married to Robert Freitag, with whom she had 3 children: Oliver Tobias, Benedict, and Christopher, who committed suicide at age 20. She died on 5 September 2012, aged 92, in Uster.

The son Benedict was married and lived together from 1987 to 1992 with singer Nena, with whom he had 3 children.

== Awards ==
- 1951 Deutscher Kritikerpreis
- 1997 Louise-Dumont-Topaz
- 1965 Hans-Reinhart-Ring
- 1990 Order of Merit of the Federal Republic of Germany (I. Class)
- 2005 Golden Medal of Honor by the Government Council of the Canton Zürich
- 2011 Armin-Ziegler-Preis

== Work ==
=== Film and television ===
- 1969: Der Fall Mariotti
- 1970: Stückgut
- 1977: Ein Glas Wasser
- 1980–1991: Der Alte, (3 episodes)
- 1983: Katzenspiel
- 1990: Wings of Fame
- 1995–1998: Derrick (5 episodes)
- 1998: Effis Nacht
- 2008: Um Himmels Willen: Weihnachten in Kaltenthal

=== Theater performances ===
- 1943 in the Schauspielhaus Zürich: Shen Te in the premiere of Bertolt Brecht's play Der gute Mensch von Sezuan (The Good Person of Szechwan). (Director: Leonard Steckel)
- 1950 in the Schlosspark Theater, Berlin and Schauspielhaus Hamburg: The bride in Bluthochzeit by Wolfgang Fortner
- 1963 in the Schlosspark Theater, Berlin: Martha in the german premiere of Edward Albee's Who's Afraid of Virginia Woolf? (translated as Wer hat Angst vor Virginia Woolf?) under director Boleslaw Barlog.
- 1971 in the Düsseldorfer Schauspielhaus: The main role in the premiere of Wolfgang Hildesheimer's adaption of Schiller's Mary Stuart under director Konrad Swinarski,
- 1977 in the Bayerisches Staatsschauspiel in Munich: Mephisto in Michael Degen's adaption of Goethe's Faust
- 1984 in the Schauspielhaus Zürich: Irma in Jean Genet's The Balcony (as Der Balkon) with director Werner Düggelin.
- 1998 in the Akademietheater München: Elsa or Effi in Rolf Hochhuth's Effis Nacht with director August Everding.

=== Bibliography ===
- With Regina Carstensen in 2009: Schließlich ist man doch jeden Abend ein anderer Mensch. Mein Leben. Pendo. ISBN 3-86612-233-0
