= Friederike (operetta) =

Singspiel in three acts composed by Franz Lehár

- Singspiel by Franz Lehár
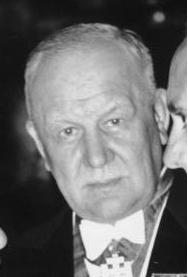
- Lehár, a few years after composing the work
- Librettist: Ludwig Herzer and Fritz Löhner
- Language: German
- Premiere: October 4, 1928; Berlin

Friederike is a singspiel in three acts composed by Austro-Hungarian composer Franz Lehár to a libretto written by Ludwig Herzer and Fritz Löhner. Premiered in 1928, it follows the story of a young woman, Friederike, a pastor’s daughter in Alsace who has an intense but ultimately doomed romance with Johann Wolfgang von Goethe, as she lovingly sacrifices their relationship so he can pursue his literary career in Weimar.

== Background ==
Friederike belongs to the tradition of biographical operetta, a genre that was popularized by prominent figures in the 1920s opera scene in which the love lives of historical figures is dramatized. Previous incursions into the genre include Paganini (1925), which was followed shortly thereafter by Der Zarewitsch (1926). The operetta portrays the youthful Johann Wolfgang von Goethe and his romantic involvement with Friederike Brion, the vicar's daughter, between Sessenheim and Strasbourg in 1771 and 1779. The subject matter of the operetta became controversial: critics and intellectuals regarded the idea as inappropriate, as they were alarmed at the prospect of a commercial operetta putting such a revered figure of German literature as Goethe onstage, while the general public was eager for the premiere.

The work premiered on October 4, 1928, to a sold-out Metropol-Theater (nowadays called the Komische Oper), in Berlin, with Richard Tauber portraying Goethe and Käthe Dorsch portraying Friederike. It was first published in 1928, by Crescendo Theaterverlag, in Berlin. It was later reprinted in New York by Franz Lehár's Glocken-Verlag. Subsequent foreign premieres were adapted rather than merely translated, with characters often changing to suit the target audience. The British premiere, entitled Frederica and adapted by Adrian Ross and Harry S. Pepper, was given at the Palace Theater, in London, on September 9, 1930. A very successful premiere running for a total of 110 performances, it was led by soprano Lea Seidl performing Frederica and Joseph Hislop portraying Goethe. An additional English-language premiere was given as part of the Broadway circuit in New York. Entitled Frederika from an adaptation by Edward Eliscu orchestrated from the vocal score by Hilding Anderson and William Challis, it was premiered at the Imperial Theatre on February 4, 1937, and ran for 95 performances. Dennis King and Helen Gleason led the cast.

== Roles ==
Role	Voice type
Karl August, Grand Duke of Saxe-Weimar	spoken role
Johann Jakob Brion, pastor of Sesenheim	spoken role
Magdalena, Brion's wife	alto
Salomea, Brion's daughter	soubrette
Friederike, Brion's daughter	soprano
Johann Wolfgang Goethe, law student	tenor
Friedrich Leopold Weyland, medicine student and friend of Goethe's	—
Jakob Michael Reinhold Lenz, candidate of theology and friend of Goethe's	tenor buffo
Franz Lerse, law student and friend of Goethe's	—
Johann Heinrich Jung-Stilling, medicine student and friend of Goethe's	—
John Meyer, medicine student and friend of Goethe's	—
George Engelbach, law student and friend of Goethe's	—
Captain Knebel	—
Madame Schöll, dame of Strasbourg society	—
Hortense, Schöll's daughter and dame of Strasbourg society	—
Madame Hahn, dame of Strasbourg society	—
Liselotte, Hahn's daughter and dame of Strasbourg society	—
Dorothée, friend of the Strasbourg society	—
Ännchen, friend of the Strasbourg society	—
Babette, friend of the Strasbourg society	—
Christel, maid in the Brion household	—
Klärechen, friend of Friederike's	—
Lottchen, friend of Friederike's	—
Bärbchen, friend of Friederike's	—
Malchen, friend of Friederike's	—
A mail coach driver	—
Schöpflin, a farmer from Sesenheim	—
Fritzchen, a child from Sesenheim	—
Peasants, young boys and girls, gentlemen and ladies of society, and servants in the household of Madame Schöll

== Structure and musical numbers ==
The operetta is scored for on-stage voices, a chorus, and an orchestra consisting of two flutes (second flute doubling piccolo), two oboes, two clarinets, two bassoons, four horns, two trumpets, three trombones, a tuba, timpani, a percussion section, a celesta, an organ, a harp, and a standard string section. Following the librettists' literary ambitions, Lehár distanced the work from the conventional idea of the operetta. He used numbers for guidance, but employed leitmotivic connections and stylistic unity, bringing the opera closer to art music than the traditional elements associated to operettas. The number list is structured as follows:

Musical number	Title	Characters	Incipit
Act I
—	Vorspiel (Prelude)	—	—
1	—	Father Brion and his wife	—
2	Gott gab einen schönen Tag... (Song)	Friederike and the children	"Gott gab einen schönen Tag..."
3	Kleine Blumen, kleine Blätter (Song)	Friederike	"Von ihm! Von ihm!"
4	Mit Mädchen sich vertragen	Weyland, Lese, Jung-Stilling, Meyer, Engelbach and other students, then Salomea	"Mit Mädchen sich vertragen"
4½	Die Mädels sind nur zum Küssen da (Song)	Salomea, Weyland, Lerse, Jung-Stilling, Meyer, Engelbach and the other students	"Braco, so hab' ich die Männer gern"
4¾	Abgang	—	"Nur zum Küssen"
5	O, wie schön, wie wunderschön (Waltz)	Entrance of Goethe	"O, wie schön"
5½	Blicke ich auf deine Hände (Duet)	Friederike and Goethe	"Nun kann ich nicht mehr schweigen"
6	Lämmchen brav (Song)	Lenz	"Du bist so sanft"
7	Sah ein Knab' ein Röslein stehn	Goethe	"Da schwebt sie hin"
8	Finale I	Friederike, Salomea, Klärchen, Lottchen, Bärbchen, Malche, Goethe, Lenz, Jung-Stilling, Lerse, Meyer, Engelbach, Weyland, Mädchen und Studenten, Schulmeister, Florian and two musicians	"Zu allen guten Stunden"
Act II
9	Menuett	—	—
10	Elsässer Kind (Ländler)	Salomea and Lenz	"Bin ich wirklich schön"
11	Stammbuchszene	Liselotte, Hortense, Dorothée, Ännchen, Babette, Goethe and Friederike	"Lieber Doktor"
12	All mein Fühlen, all mein Sehnen (Duet)	Friederike and Goethe	"Lieb' Kind"
13	O Mädchen, mein Mädchen (Song)	Goethe	"O Mädchen, mein Mädchen, wie lieb ich dich!"
14	Szene	Friederike and Weyland	"Genug, ich habe den Sinn des Märchens erfaßt"
14½	Warum hast du mich wachgeküßt (Song)	Friederike	"Warum hast du mich wachgeküßt"
15	Finale II	Friederike, Salomea, Goethe, Lenz, Captain Knebel, Schöll, Hahn, Liselotte, Hortense and the rest of society	"Bist du denn noch mein Riekchen"
Act III
16	Zwischenspiel	—	—
16½	—	Father Brion and his wife	—
17	Riekchen, komm mit uns zum Tanz	Friederike, Klärchen, Lottchen, Bärbchen, Malchen and other ladies	"Riekchen, komm mit uns zum Tanz"
18	Heute tanzen wir den Pfälzertanz (Duet)	Salomea and Lenz	"Heute tanzen wir den Pfälzertanz
18½	Rheinländer	—	—
19	Szene	Goethe and Karl August	"Siebst du, Herzog"
19½	Ein Herz, wie Gold so rein (Song)	Goethe	"Ich weiß es wohl"
19¾	Finaletto	Friederike and Goethe	"Leb' wohl"

== Reception ==
Friederike was successful, being adapted into different languages and premiered in other countries. When celebrating the operetta's 100th performance in Germany, Lehár admitted to have been taken aback by the proposition of portraying Goethe onstage, a concern that was shared by critics before the premiere, and stated that he would not do it "for [any] price. [...] I haven't gone crazy yet!". Both Ernst Bloch and Josef Goebbels expressed troble over the operetta, as were audiences who wrote to Berlin's Akademie der Künste demanding and official response.
