= Frederica (1932 film) =

1932 film

- Directed by: Fritz Friedmann-Frederich
- Written by: Ludwig Herzer (book); Fritz Löhner-Beda (book)
- Starring: Mady Christians; Hans-Heinz Bollmann; Veit Harlan
- Cinematography: Werner Brandes
- Music by: Eduard Künneke
- Production company: Indra-Film Rolf Raffé
- Release date: 1 November 1932
- Running time: 92 minutes
- Country: Germany
- Languages: German, English and French

Frederica (German: Friederike) is a 1932 German historical musical drama film directed by Fritz Friedmann-Frederich and starring Mady Christians, Hans-Heinz Bollmann and Veit Harlan. It is based on the 1928 operetta of the same name by Franz Lehar which depicts the love affair between Friederike Brion and the young Goethe.

== Cast ==
- Mady Christians as Friederike
- Hans-Heinz Bollmann as Johann Wolfgang Goethe
- Veit Harlan as Herzog Karl August von Weimar
- Eduard von Winterstein as Hauptmann Knebel
- Ferdinand Bonn as Kaiserlicher Rat Goethe
- Erika von Wagner as Elisabeth
- Paul Hörbiger as Pfarrer Brion
- Ida Wüst as Magdalena
- Else Elster
- Otto Wallburg as Ewiger Student Wagner
- Karl Meixner
- Adele Sandrock as Madame Schöll
- Else von Hartmann
- Maria Fein
- Hedwig Wangel
- Leopold von Ledebur as Goethes Wirt
- Theo Lingen as Lachender Herr

== Bibliography ==
- Waldman, Harry (2008). Nazi Films in America, 1933–1942. McFarland. ISBN 978-0-7864-3861-7.
