= Heidenröslein =

Poem by Johann Wolfgang von Goethe, published in 1799

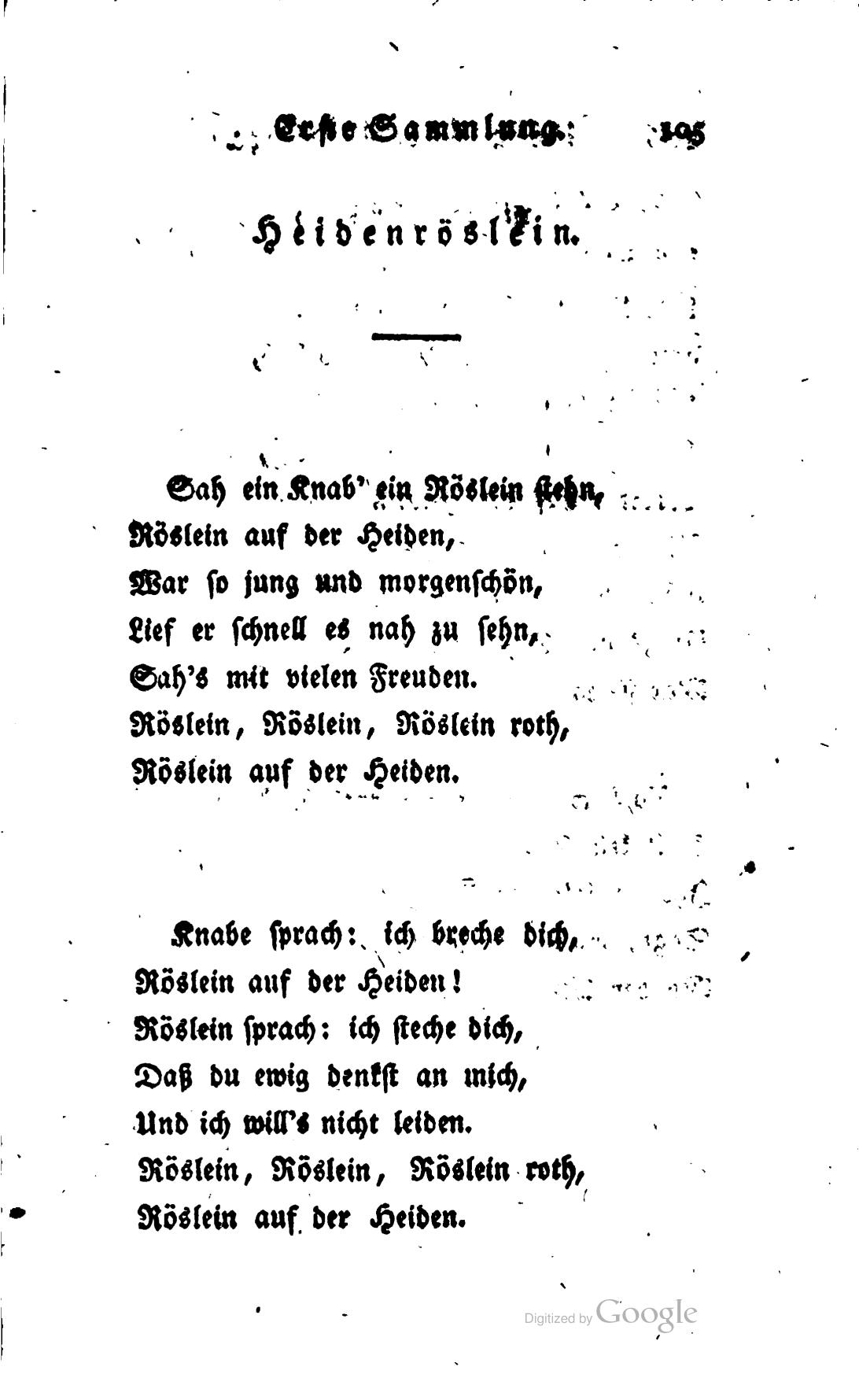
Heidenröslein

"Heidenröslein" (“Little Rose on the Heath”) is a poem by Johann Wolfgang von Goethe written in 1771 during his Strasbourg period, inspired by his relationship with Friederike Brion, the daughter of a local parson in Sessenheim with whom he had a brief but intense love affair. The poem was first published as verse in 1789 by Georg Joachim Göschen. It describes a young man who observes a freshly blooming rose sitting upon a heath and decides to pluck it, despite the rose's warning that it will prick him so that he will never be able to forget the flower. The poem has been frequently set to music, most notably by Franz Schubert (D. 257, 1815), but also by Heinrich Werner (1829), whose simple strophic melody became widely disseminated in 19th-century songbooks, and by Franz Lehár (1928), who incorporated a setting of the song into his operetta Friederike.

Literary scholars have differed in their interpretation of Heidenröslein. Some modern interpretations emphasize moralized readings of coercion or sexual transgression into the poetic subtext, while others situate the poem within the conventions of eighteenth-century courtship as folkloric allegory, in which floral imagery commonly represents an unbetrothed young woman and expressions of resistance function as conventional tropes of unrequited love rather than literal depictions of physical harm or violation.

The interpretation of the final stanza is further complicated by well-documented variation in the poem's early textual transmission. In Göschen's 1789 collected edition, the line appears with the dative pronoun ihr and the preterite verb form mußte (“Half ihr doch kein Weh und Ach … Mußte es eben leiden”), whereas later authoritative editions associated with Goethe's 1827 Vollständige Ausgabe letzter Hand regularize the passage to ihm and the present-tense form muß. The earlier Göschen edition was not overseen by Goethe in the same manner as the Ausgabe letzter Hand, which was prepared under the author's direct supervision (as noted in the editorial history of Goethe's works); however, scholars note that this distinction does not, in the absence of an original autograph manuscript with marginal commentary, establish definitive authorial intent.

Scholars further observe that neither textual variant explicitly specifies moralistic transgression, physical injury, sexual violence, or trauma, though these themes are common in late-20th- and early-21st-century criticism. The idiomatic construction “Half X doch kein Weh und Ach” evaluates the ineffectiveness of lament or resistance, while the subsequent clause “Mußte/Muß es eben leiden” leaves the object of endurance grammatically indeterminate, a point noted in philological commentary on the poem's textual variants. On this basis, various scholars caution against readings that construe the episode as a literal depiction of coercive harm, while others continue to interpret the poem through modern analytical frameworks that emphasize dynamics of power asymmetry and transgression.

== Text ==
Göschen version
Sah ein Knab' ein Röslein stehn,
Röslein auf der Heiden,
War so jung und morgenschön,
Lief er schnell es nah zu sehn,
Sah's mit vielen Freuden.
Röslein, Röslein, Röslein rot,
Röslein auf der Heiden.

Knabe sprach: "Ich breche dich,
Röslein auf der Heiden."
Röslein sprach: "Ich steche dich,
Dass du ewig denkst an mich,
Und ich will's nicht leiden."
Röslein, Röslein, Röslein rot,
Röslein auf der Heiden.

Und der wilde Knabe brach
's Röslein auf der Heiden;
Röslein wehrte sich und stach,
Half ihr (Note: "ihm" in Goethe's "Vollständige Ausgabe letzter Hand" (1827)) doch kein Weh und Ach,
Musste (Note: "muß" in Goethe's "Vollständige Ausgabe letzter Hand" (1827)) es eben leiden.
Röslein, Röslein, Röslein rot,
Röslein auf der Heiden.

Literal translation
Saw a lad a little rose standing,
Little rose upon the heath,
[It] was so young and morning-fair,
He ran quickly it near to see,
[He] saw it with much delight,
Little rose, little rose, little rose red,
Little rose upon the heath.

[The] lad said: "I [will] pluck you,
Little rose upon the heath."
Little rose said: "I [will] prick you,
So that you [will] forever think of me,
and I want not to endure it."
Little rose, little rose, little rose red,
Little rose upon the heath.

And the willful lad plucked
the little rose upon the heath;
Little rose resisted and pricked,
Yet helped her no pain or woe,
It must [be] endured anyway.
Little rose, little rose, little rose red,
Little rose upon the heath.

Bowring translation
Once a boy a Rosebud spied,
Heathrose fair and tender,
All array'd in youthful pride,–
Quickly to the spot he hied,
Ravished by her splendour.
Rosebud, rosebud, rosebud red,
Heathrose fair and tender!

Said the boy, "I'll now pick thee,
Heathrose fair and tender!"
Said the rosebud, "I'll prick thee,
So that thou'lt remember me,
Ne'er will I surrender!"
Rosebud, rosebud, rosebud red,
Heathrose fair and tender!

Now the cruel boy must pick
Heathrose fair and tender;
Rosebud did her best to prick,–
Vain 'twas 'gainst her fate to kick–
She must needs surrender.
Rosebud, rosebud, rosebud red,
Heathrose fair and tender!

== Settings ==
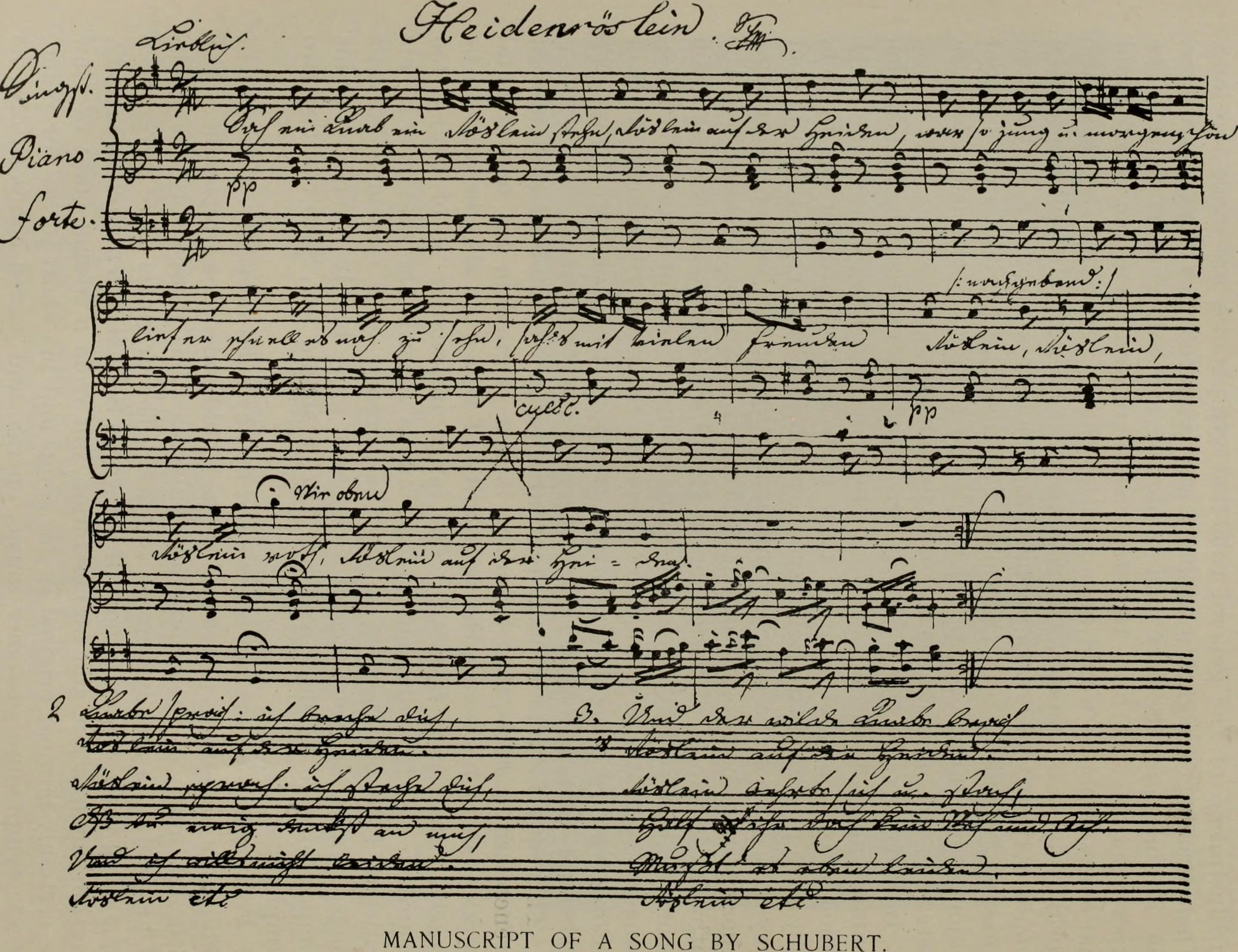
Schubert's "Heidenröslein"

It has been set to music by a number of composers, most notably in 1815 by Franz Schubert as his D. 257. Schubert's setting is partially based on Pamina's and Papageno's duet "Könnte jeder brave Mann" from the end of act 1 of Mozart's The Magic Flute. The 1829 setting by Heinrich Werner (below) became a popular folk song.
