= Marianne Alfermann =

German actress and singer

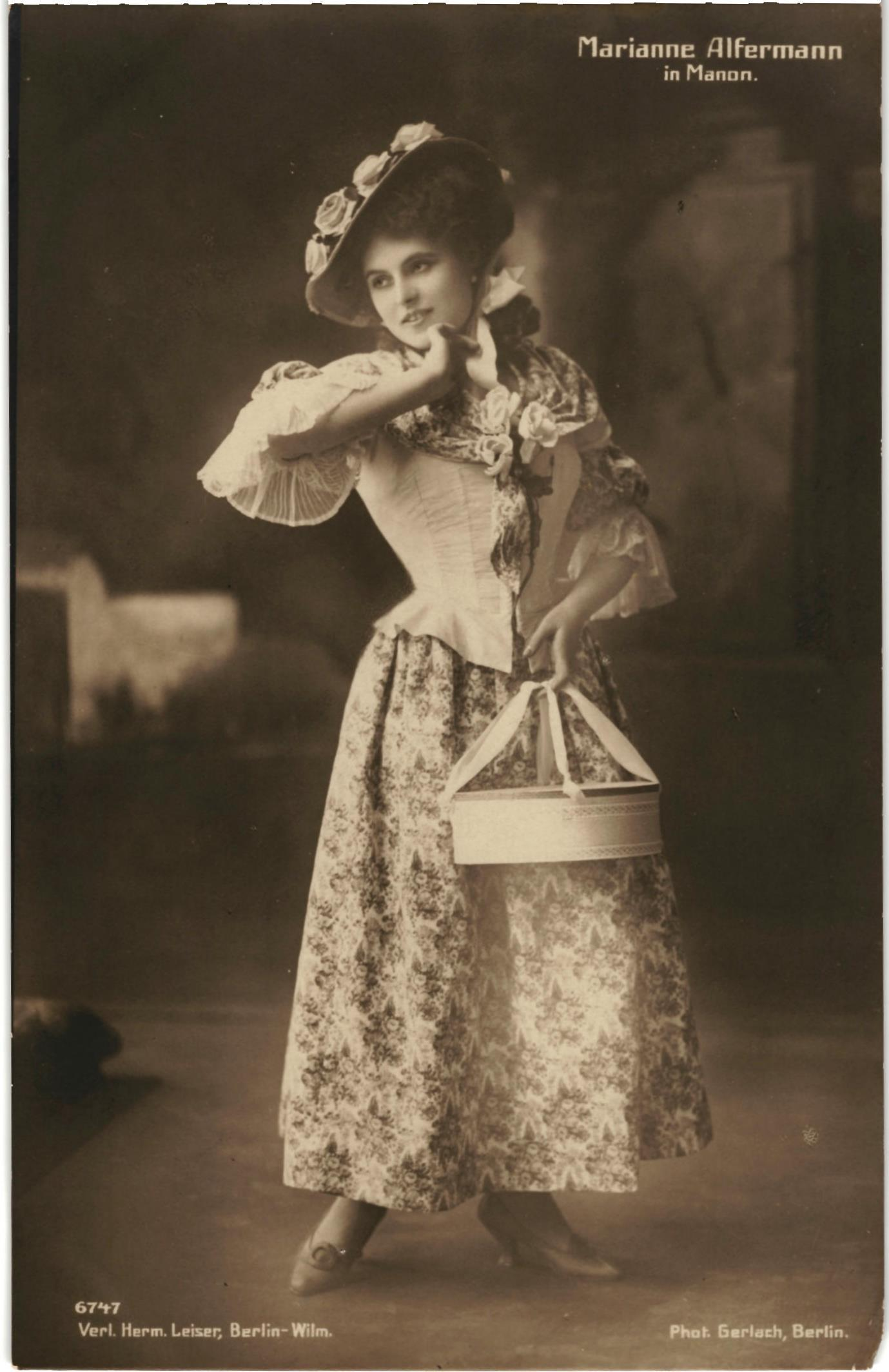
Marianne Alfermann

Marianne Elisabeth Felicitas Alfermann (8 June 1891 – 27 February 1954) was a German soprano and actress.

== Life ==
Born in Berlin, Alfermann came to the Stadttheater Main in 1910 after acting lessons and singing training in the soprano range voice. In December 1911 she had a guest performance at the Berlin Hofoper and so she left Mainz in 1912 and was a member of the ensemble there until 1917. From 1917 to 1918 she then worked in Frankfurt.

After that she lived in Berlin from 1918 on and worked as a guest from there, but at this time she already turned increasingly to operetta.

In the 1920s she continued her career at various Berlin stages as well as in the just-opened entertainment radio Funk-Stunde Berlin.

In March 1922 she married Gustav Lombard, the later SS-Brigadeführer and Major General of the Waffen-SS, from whom she had a son the same year.

In 1926 she played the leading role in a Hugo Hirsch's revue in Wieder Metropol". Still in 1927/28 she belonged to the operetta of the Berlin Central Theater. The stage yearbook 1934 notes "guest" under her Berlin address.

According to a marginal note in her entry in the Berlin Birth Register, Alfermann died in February 1954 in the Bavarian town of Gräfelfing at the age of 62.

Alfermann made recordings in the 1920s, as a soloist and in duet with Richard Bitterauf, Hans-Heinz Bollmann, Leopold Hainisch and Erik Wirl on the labels Vox and Homocord.

== Recordings ==
With DISMARC.org 11 titles were recorded:

- with Vox:
  - uncredited
    - Vox 1954 (mx. 2826 B). Für dich, mein Schatz, für dich hab ich mich schön gemacht. Lied und Blues from Der Orlow (Bruno Granichstaedten) Orchestra Georges Boulanger, with female vocals (Marianne Alfermann?) ca. 1925
  - ab 1926 as Marianne Alfermann:
    - VOX 02199 30 cm (mx. 851-AA). Lied der Gifte, from Wieder Metropol (Revue) (NE 10/1926, (K1926)) M: Hugo Hirsch/Bearbeitung: Franz Grothe/T: Arthur Rebner nd Hans Zerlett
    - VOX 02199 30 cm (mx. 852-AA). Träume, Liebling, von mir, aus: Wieder Metropol (Revue) (NE 10/1926, (K1926)). M: Hugo Hirsch/Bearbeitung: Franz Grothe/T: Arthur Rebner and Hans Zerlett. Marianne Alfermann with the Jazz-Symphonie-Orchester of Bernard Etté
    - VOX 02210 30 cm (mx. 1555-AA). Wie ein Blütenrausch im Mai (song) from Der blonde Zigeuner (operetta) (NE 04/1927). M: Martin Knopf/T: Oskar Felix and H. Frey. Marianne Alfermann with orchestra accompaniment. violin solo: G. Boulanger
    - VOX 02210 30 cm (mx. 1556-AA). Performance song of Lona, from Der blonde Zigeuner (operetta) (NE 04/1927). M: Martin Knopf/T: Oskar Felix and H. Frey. Marianne Alfermann with orchestra accompaniment.
    - VOX 4199 25 cm (mx. 1105-1BB). Wenn du mich sitzen lässt (Lied und Foxtrot) from Die Zirkusprinzessin (operetta). M: Emmerich Kálmán/T:Julius Brammer and Alfred Grünwald. Erik Wirl and Marianne Alfermann with orchestra accompaniment.
    - VOX 4199 25 cm (mx. 1107-1BB). Mein Darling muss so sein wie du (Lied und Foxtrot) from Die Zirkusprinzessin (operetta). M: Emmerich Kálmán/T:Julius Brammer and Alfred Grünwald. Erik Wirl and Marianne Alfermann with orchestra accompaniment.
    - VOX 4201 25 cm (mx. 1627-BB). Wenn man für's Herz was braucht (Foxtrot) from Der blonde Zigeuner (operetta) (NE 04/1927). M: Martin Knopf/T: Oskar Felix, H. Frey. Marianne Alfermann and Erik Wirl with orchestra accompaniment.
    - VOX 4201 25 cm (mx. 1628-BB). Ich schleich’ zur Nacht (Blues) from Der blonde Zigeuner (operetta) (Operette) (NE 04/1927). M: Martin Knopf/T: Oskar Felix, H. Frey. Marianne Alfermann and Erik Wirl with orchestra accompaniment.
    - VOX 4202 25 cm (mx. ?). Amalia, ich brauch' Liebe (Foxtrot) from Der blonde Zigeuner (operetta) (NE 04/1927). M: Martin Knopf/T: O. Felix, H. Frey. Marianne Alfermann and Leopold Hainisch (tenor) with orchestra accompaniment.
    - VOX 4202 25 cm (mx. ?). Selbst die roten Rosen küssen (duet) from Der blonde Zigeuner (operetta) (NE 04/1927). M: Martin Knopf/T: Oskar Felix and H. Frey. Marianne Alfermann and Erik Wirl with orchestra accompaniment.
- auf Homocord:
  - Homocord 4-8839 30 cm (mx. M 52 276). Niemand liebt dich so wie ich. Duet from Paganini (F. Lehár) (A 7 December 1927)
  - Homocord 4-8839 30 cm (mx. M 52 277). Hab nur dich allein. Duet from Paganini (F. Lehár) (A 30 January 1928). Marianne Alfermann and Hanns Heinz Bollmann (tenor) with orchestra accompaniment.
  - Homocord 4-8905 30 cm (mx. T.M. 52 492). Brüderlein and Schwesterlein, from die Fledermaus (Joh. Strauss) Großes Operetten-Ensemble: Marianne Alfermann, Richard Bitterauf, Hanns Heinz Bollmann, Else Jansen, Richard Klewitz, Vera Schwarz. Choir of the Berliner Staatsoper. Berliner Sinfonie-Orchester, conductor: Dr. Felix Günther
  - Homocord Testpressung 25 cm, o. Nr., Matr.-Nr. 20 510: Flüsterndes Silber, rauschende Welle (Melcher), im wax: Alfermann und Bitterauf, mech. copyr. 1928. B side idem but another take [mx. 20 510-1)
