= The Wandering Light =

1916 film directed by Robert Wiene

- Directed by: Robert Wiene
- Written by: Ernst von Wildenbruch (story); Irene Daland; Robert Wiene
- Produced by: Oskar Messter
- Starring: Henny Porten; Bruno Decarli; Theodor Becker
- Production company: Messter Film
- Release date: 1 September 1916
- Country: Germany
- Languages: Silent; German intertitles

The Wandering Light (German: Das wandernde Licht) is a 1916 German silent drama film directed by Robert Wiene and starring Henny Porten, Bruno Decarli and Theodor Becker. It was based on a short story by Ernst von Wildenbruch. A Count marries a woman who come to wrongly believe that he is mad.

== Cast ==
- Henny Porten – Anna von Glassner
- Bruno Decarli – Baron von Fahrenwald
- Theodor Becker – Kammerdiener des Barons
- Emil Rameau – Major von Glassner
- Elsa Wagner – Frau von Glassner

== Bibliography ==
- Jung, Uli & Schatzberg, Walter. Beyond Caligari: The Films of Robert Wiene. Berghahn Books, 1999.
