= Heinrich Werner (composer) =

German composer and choir director (1800–1833)

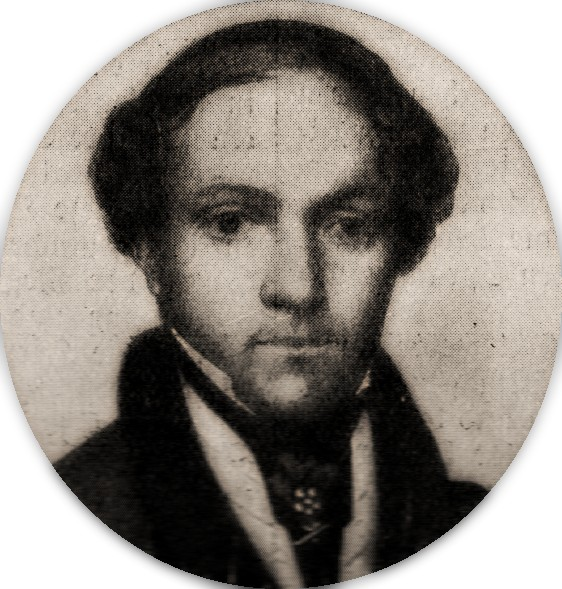
Heinrich Werner (1833)

Heinrich Werner (2 October 1800 – 3 March 1833) was a German composer. Werner was born into a musical family in Kirchohmfeld in the Eichsfeld district of Thuringia, then part of the Holy Roman Empire. Initially trained at home, he played the organ for the local church at the age of 11 and became a choral singer at Sankt Andreasberg at 15. His older brother in Braunschweig had him study music and attend the Gymnasium there. Starting in 1821, he studied in Erfurt and took the teaching examination the next year; he then led the chorus at the city's opera house and taught music students. From 1825, he was choral director at the court theatre at Braunschweig.

He is said to have written 84 compositions, mostly songs, including a setting of Goethe's poem Heidenröslein. It was first publicly performed in 1829, under his direction, and bore as title the first line, "Sah ein Knab' ein Röslein stehn" ("A boy saw a little rose standing"). It was seen as superior to all the roughly 100 versions that had preceded his, and became the outstanding popular-song version (although the Schubert art-song setting, published in 1821, has outlasted it).

He died at the age of 32 in Braunschweig in 1833, having become ill with tuberculosis the previous year.
