= Friederike Brion =

Parson's daughter (1752–1813)

- Born: 1752; Niederrœdern, Alsace
- Died: 1813 (aged 60–61)

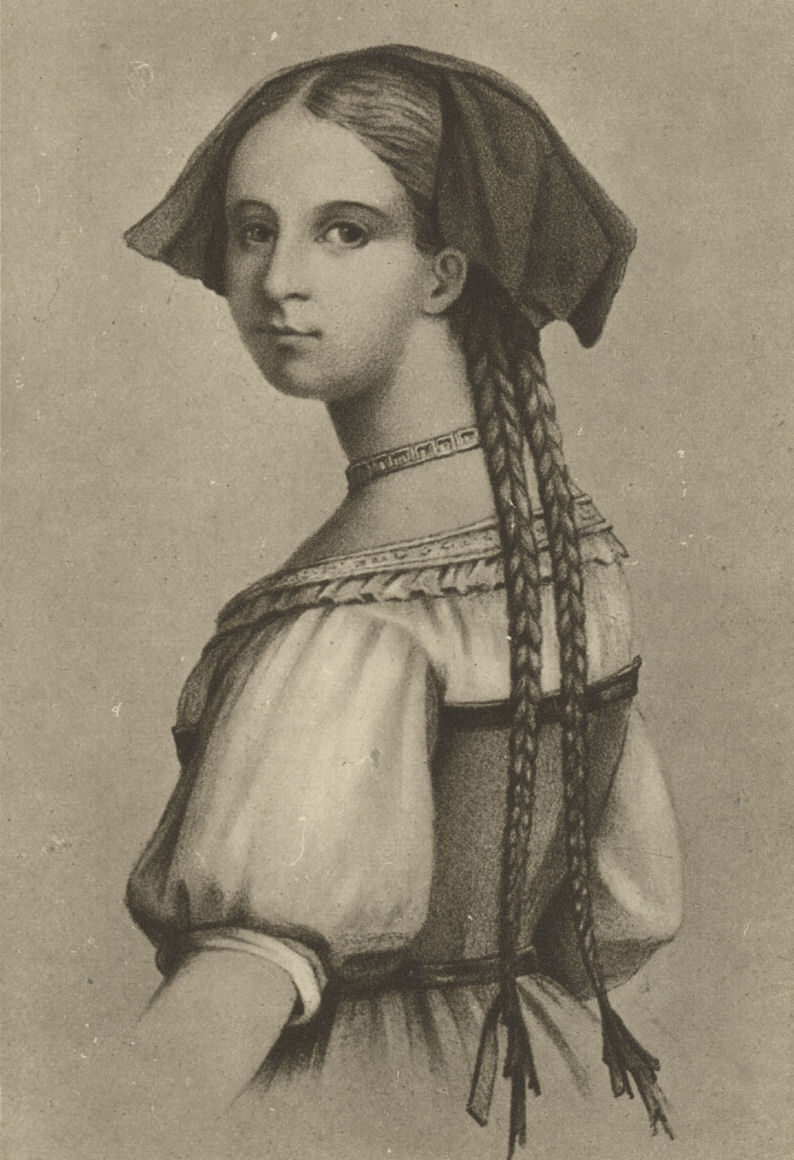
Friederike Brion imagined in Alsatian attire

Friederike Elisabeth Brion (probably 19 April 1752 – 3 April 1813) was a parson's daughter who had a short but intense love affair with the young Johann Wolfgang Goethe.

== Biography ==
Born in Niederrœdern, Alsace, the date of birth of Friederike is uncertain because the parish registers were destroyed during the French Revolution. Friederike was the third of five surviving children of the married couple Brion. The father, Jakob Brion, took over a post as the parson of the village of Sessenheim on St. Martin's Day 1760. Friederike — pretty, lively, but a little sickly — grew up in the village.

The young Johann Wolfgang Goethe from Frankfurt am Main visited the hospitable parsonage, like several other young people, while studying law in Strasbourg. He first reached Sessenheim in October 1770 and met Friederike there, for the first time, the same month, when he was exploring the region on horseback with an Alsatian friend, the medical student Friedrich Leopold Weyland (1750-1785). His depiction of Friederike, whom he liked most of the parson's three daughters, contains a lot of fantastical additions, but shows the situation vividly and lovingly, mentioning Friederike's slenderness and lightness, her way of walking "as if she did not have to bear any weight", the impression that her neck was almost too delicate to bear her dainty head with its huge plaits, the very direct glance of her serene blue eyes, and her nice snub-nose "searching as freely in the air as if there could be no sorrow in the world". The description is counted a literary masterwork that shows an enchanting scene with the help of modest colors.

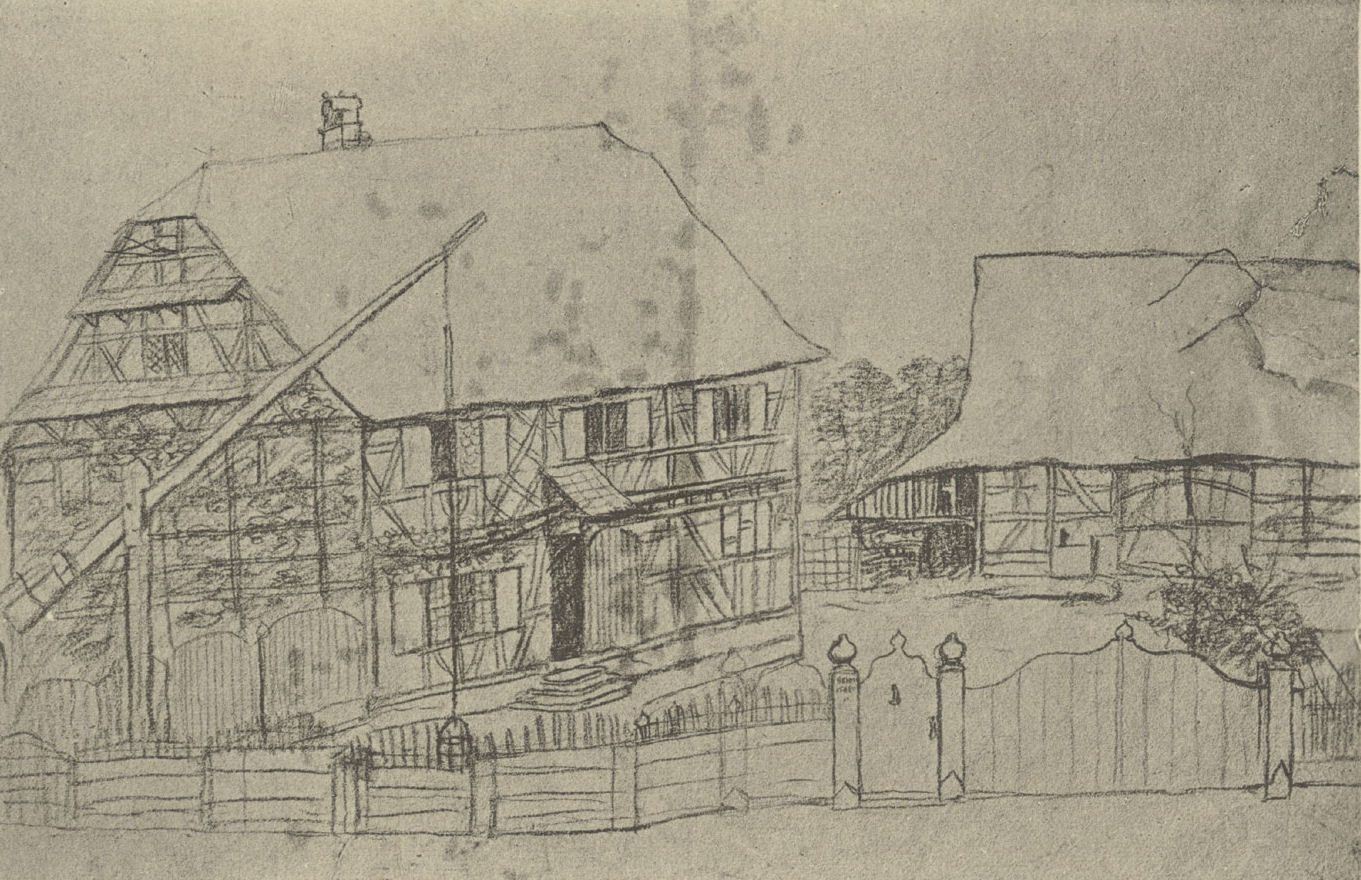
Parsonage of Sessenheim around 1770. Drawing by Goethe

Goethe, beginning already in winter, rode to Sessenheim many times, over the following months, and used to stay with the Brions for periods of up to several weeks. He roamed the surrounding area with Friederike, undertook boat trips with her, in the waters of the Rhine, and visited acquaintances with her. For the ensuing time, Sessenheim became the “center of the Earth” for the poet. He experienced an idyll that brought about things new and unknown to him and was inspirited by this to verse, after a longer time, again. In spring 1771, he wrote a couple of poems and songs, which he sometimes sent to Friederike with painted ribbons. These Sesenheimer Lieder (among them Maifest, Willkommen und Abschied and Heidenröslein) became crucial for the Sturm und Drang and founded Goethe's fame as a poet.

But already in early summer 1771 Goethe thought of ending the liaison. On 7 August of that year, he saw Friederike for the last time before he returned to Frankfurt. Only from Frankfurt, he sent the beloved a letter by which he definitely severed the love affair. Friederike answered him in a heart-rending letter.

Goethe at least one time—on a trip to Switzerland in 1779—returned to the Sessenheim parsonage. Some uncertain sources mention a further visit in 1782, when Friederike's older sister Maria Salomea married Gottfried Marx from Strasbourg, who had just become parson in Diersburg (today Hohberg).

In summer 1772, Jakob Michael Reinhold Lenz courted Friederike, who was still strongly suffering from her lover's grief. But Friederike stayed unmarried till the end of her life and lived in her parents' house up to the death of her father in 1787. (Her mother had died just the year before.) After that, she and her younger sister Sofie went to live with their brother Christian at the parsonage of Rothau (Bas-Rhin), where they stayed when Christian was transferred. They earned their living by selling weaving, earthenware, pottery and handicraft produce and operated a boarding-house for girls from Sessenheim and the village's surroundings who were thought to learn French at a school erected for that sake in Rothau.

Friederike moved to the Diersburg parsonage in 1801 to support her sickish older sister Salomea, and stayed there, afterwards, with some interruptions. In 1805, she followed the family to Meißenheim. Salomea died in 1807. In 1813, Friederike had to ask her sister Sofie to provide for her. After her death in Meißenheim near Lahr on 5 April of the same year, she was buried on the Meißenheim cemetery. The grave's tombstone by Wilhelm Hornberger was put in its place only in 1866.

=== The Brion dynasty ===
Friederike's nephew Gustave became a painter of some renown, while Philippe Auguste Brion (1832–1902), his brother Albert Brion (1843–1910) and his sons Auguste Brion (1861–1940) (builder of Hôtel Brion) and Paul Brion (1866–1928) all became architects.

== Influence onto Goethe's work and authority ==
Goethe's Sessenheim time was rather only superficially an idyll, while the prevailing tone of the poet's liaison with Friederike remained a tragic one. The love affair grew on the basis of a general feeling to be moving towards a higher human existence that coined life throughout Europe in those times and made possible an especially liberal intercourse of young people. Goethe, thus, was more or less counted Friederike's fiancé without having talked the thing over with her, let alone with her parents. The love affair was slowly broken up, again, without a palatable transition.

The enthusiasm of many for Goethe—among them Johann Gottfried Herder—has been dampened by the impression his behavior had broken the heart of an all-too tender girl, in the case of Friederike Brion.

Friederike, together with Herder and the Alsatian nature and landscape, widened Goethe's spirit and fired the poet's creative power. Willkommen und Abschied and Maifest unite deep inner feelings with the atmosphere out in nature as German poetry has not done that before, since Walther von der Vogelweide, while Heidenröslein most clearly shows how well Goethe knew to follow the character of the popular ballad and, at the same time, most lively and concisely represents the poet's adventure with Friederike.

Friederike was the prototype of the figures of Maria, the sister of the hero of Goethe's drama Goetz von Berlichingen (1773), and of Marie Beaumarchais in the poet's five-act tragedy Clavigo (1774). The figure of Margarete in Goethe's tragic play Faust has even more directly been given Friederike's traits outwardly and inwardly.

== Friederike Brion in art ==
Franz Lehár has composed an operetta Friederike on the foundation of the love affair (1928). In 1932 this was turned into a film Frederica in which she was played by Mady Christians.
