= Hans-Heinz Bollmann =

German opera singer

Hans-Heinz Bollmann (1 December 1889 – 9 July 1974) was a German operatic and operetta singer tenor.

== Life and career ==
Born in Hamburg, Hans-Heinz Bollmann came from an old-established Hamburg merchant family. He actually wanted to become a dentist, but then studied singing in Hamburg and with Enrico Rosario in Milan.

His artistic career began in 1912 at the municipal Theatre of Bochum. From 1913 to 1915 Bollmann was engaged at the municipal Theatre of Wilhelmshaven. Afterwards he was drafted to the military service. After the end of the war he went to the municipal Theatre of Nuremberg. From 1921 to 1925 he belonged to the ensemble of the Hamburg opera house. In the 1925–1926 season he gave guest performances at the Staatsoper Unter den Linden. There he sang among others José in Carmen, Max in Der Freischütz, Rodolfo in La Bohème, Baron Lummer in Intermezzo by Richard Strauss, Pinkerton in Madama Butterfly, Hans in Smetana's The Bartered Bride and Count Almaviva in Il barbiere di Siviglia.

At the end of the 1920s Bollmann turned increasingly to the operetta and sang at all large German-speaking operetta stages, among other things from 1927 to 1928 at the Theater des Westens, 1930 to 1931 at the Theater im Admiralspalast, 1935 to 1936 at the Berlin Neues Schauspielhaus (here in 1935 in the world premiere of Ball der Nationen (operetta) by Fred Raymond) and 1937 to 1938 at the Theater des Volkes (Berlin). From 1928 to 1932 he was at the Theater an der Wien, at which he took part in the premiere of Franz Lehár's operetta Schön ist die Welt in 1931, and at the Johann Strauss Theater in the latter city. Furthermore, he gave a guest performance at the Raimund Theater in Vienna in 1938. The artist was a favourite singer of Franz Lehár. He sang with great success Danilo in The Merry Widow, the title hero in Paganini, Goethe in Friederike and Armand in The Count of Luxembourg. In Berlin he sang in 1928 with Vera Schwarz as partner in La Barberina by Ascher. He also appeared more often as a guest at the Staatstheater am Gärtnerplatz in Munich.

Bollmann also performed in Paris, London and the USA. In addition, he was an extremely successful film actor and singer in the 1930s (Die Lindenwirtin, (1930) with Käthe Dorsch, Der Bettelstudent, with Jarmila Novotná, Frasquita, with Heinz Rühmann and Le Postillon de Lonjumeau, with Leo Slezak). In 1951 he played in the film The Dubarry, with Sári Barabás, and two years later he appeared on stage for the last time in the opening performance of the new Hamburg Operettenhaus in Lehár's Lustiger Witwe.

Bollmann sang gramophone records at Electrola/HMV, Homocord and the Lindström brands Gloria, Odeon Records and Parlophone.

He sang, in duet with the baritone Manfred Lewandowski, 1923-1928 cantor at the Friedenstempel in Berlin-Halensee and 1928-1938 chief cantor at the synagogue Lindenstraße in Berlin-Kreuzberg, the duet Der Tempel Brahmas strahlt from Bizet's opera Les pêcheurs de perles but also, accompanied by the NS Reich Orchestra and Choir, the patriotic song Mein Deutschland, du sollst du leben, du darf nicht untergeh'n.

== Recordings ==
- Electrola E.G. 389 / 8-42020 (mx. BW 270-III) Mattinata (Ruggiero Leoncavallo, lyrics by M. Reichardt) Hans Heinz Bollmann, tenor performance with orchestra accompaniment. Berlin 1926.
- Electrola E.G. 390 / 8-42022 (mx. BW 610-I) Postillion-Liedfrom Le postillon de Lonjumeau (Adolphe Adam) Hans Heinz Bollmann, tenor and Manfred Lewandowsky, Baritone with orchestra accompaniment, on youtube
- Gloria G.O. 10 354 (mx. Bi 783) Madame, Madame, sie sind mir nicht einerlei. Lied nach einem Motiv von [Ethelbert] Nevin (lyrics and music Billy Golwyn, N. Intrator u. Dr. Jos. Freudenthal)
- Gloria G.O. 10 556 (mx. H-62578-2) L’Africaine (G. Meyerbeer), Arie des Vasco: Land so wunderbar. Hans Heinz Bollmann with theBerlin Symphony Orchestra. Conductor: Fritz Zweig.
- Homocord 4-3151 (mx. C 1356 D) „Mutterl-Lied“ from the operetta Die Schützenliesel (Edmund Eysler – Leo Stein and Karl Lindau) Hans Heinz Bollmann, tenor, with Vienna Salon Chapel Franz Hausberger.
- Homocord 4-3732-I (mx. H-62 839) Du blonde Lindenwirtin vom Rhein. Foxtrot at the sound film Die Lindenwirtin (M. Krausz – B. Hardt-Warden) Hans Heinz Bollmann, tenor und Manfred Lewandowsky, baritone with Orchestra accompaniement, (1937) https://www.youtube.com/watch?v=EtBJyob4bIs YouTube], ca. March/April 1930.
- Homocord 4-3732-II (mx. H-62 840) Zu jeder Liebe gehört ein Gläschen Wein. Foxtrot aus dem Tonfilm Die Lindenwirtin (M. Krausz – B. Hardt-Warden) Hans Heinz Bollmann, tenor with Orchestral Accompaniment. ca. March/April 1930.
- Homocord H-3953 (mx. H-83 277–2) Schön ist die Welt. Waltz song from the operetta of the same name (F. Lehár, Dr. F. Löhner) / (H-83 276–4) Liebste, glaub' an mich, denn ich liebe dich: Lied aus der Operette Schön ist die Welt (F. Lehár, Dr. F. Löhner) Hans Heinz Bollmann, tenor with orchestra accompaniment.
- Odeon Rxx 80218 (mx. xxB 7065) O wie so trügerisch from Rigoletto (Verdi) Hans Heinz Bollmann tenor with orchestra accompaniment.
- Odeon Rxx 80460 (mx. xxB 7437) Wir sind allein nun (Die Hände in schweren Ketten). 2 acts duett (Azucena – Manrico) from Il trovatore 1. Teil (Verdi) / (mx. xxB 7438-II) dto., 2 parts. Chamber singer Sabine Kalter, lto. Hans Heinz Bollmann, tenor. With orchestra accompaniment.
- Odeon O-25465 (mx. Be 11065) Du warst mir ein schöner Traum – Lied aus der Revue-Operette Ball der Nationen (music: Fred Raymond, lyrics: Günther Schwenn) hamber singer Hans Heinz Bollmann, tenor, With orchestra accompaniment. Conducting: Kapellmeister Schmidt-Boelcke of the Metropol-Theater, Berlin.
- Parlophon B.49248 (mx. Bi 1812) Du bist meine Sonne. Song from the musical comedy Giuditta (music: Franz Lehár – lyrics: Paul Knepler and Fritz Löhner), Chamber singer Hans Heinz Bollmann with orchestra. Conductor: Kapellmeister Otto Dobrindt.

== Filmography ==
- 1930 Die Lindenwirtin
- 1930 The Beggar Student
- 1932 Friederike on IMDb
- 1934 Frasquita
- 1936 Le postillon de Lonjumeau
- 1951 Die Dubarry
