= Theodor Becker (actor) =

German actor (1880–1952)

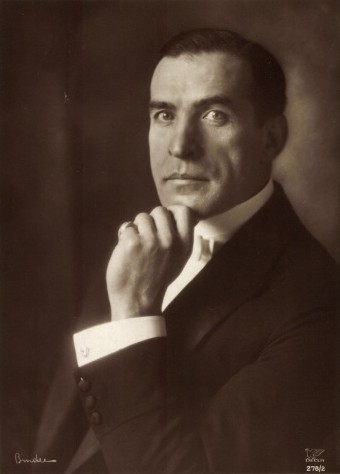
Theodor Becker in 1920.

Theodor Becker (18 February 1880, Mannheim – 26 June 1952, Coppenbrügge) was a German stage and film actor. He was married to Maria Fein and was the father of Maria Becker. Becker acted mostly at the Niedersächsisches Staatstheater Hannover but also appeared on the Berlin stage as well as in a number of silent films.

== Selected filmography ==
- The Wandering Light (1916)
- The Plague of Florence (1919)
- Das Fest der schwarzen Tulpe (1920)
- The Black Tulip Festival (1920)
- Susanne Stranzky (1921)
- Jeremias (1922)
- Fridericus Rex (1923)
- Felicitas Grolandin (1923)
- William Tell (1923)
- I.N.R.I. (1923)
- Wood Love (1925)
- Athletes (1925)
- Das deutsche Lied (1928)
