= The Conspiracy in Genoa =

1921 film

- Directed by: Paul Leni
- Written by: Friedrich Schiller (play); Georg Kaiser
- Based on: Fiesco by Friedrich Schiller
- Produced by: Hanns Lippmann
- Starring: Wilhelm Diegelmann; Maria Fein; Fritz Kortner; Hans Mierendorff
- Cinematography: Karl Hasselmann; Carl Hoffmann
- Production company: Gloria-Film
- Distributed by: UFA
- Release date: 24 February 1921
- Running time: 60 minutes
- Country: Germany
- Languages: Silent; German intertitles

The Conspiracy in Genoa (German: Die Verschwörung zu Genua) is a 1921 German silent historical drama film directed by Paul Leni and starring Wilhelm Diegelmann, Maria Fein and Fritz Kortner. It is an adaptation of the 1783 play Fiesco by Friedrich Schiller.

It premiered at the Ufa-Palast am Zoo.

== Cast ==
- Wilhelm Diegelmann as Andrea Doria, Doge von Genua
- Maria Fein as Gräfin Julia Imperiali
- Fritz Kortner as Gianettino
- Hans Mierendorff as Fiesco
- Erna Morena as Leonore
- Ilka Grüning as Matrone
- Magnus Stifter as Verrino
- Lewis Brody as Mulay Hassan
- Hellmuth Bergmann as Bourgorgnino
- Louis Krieger as Zibo
- Bernhard Goetzke as Calcagno
- Max Gülstorff as Lomellino
- Fritz Beckmann as Alte seidenhändler
- Lydia Potechina as Bertha
- Lia Eibenschütz
- Paul Günther
- Ludwig Rex
- William Dieterle

== Bibliography ==
- Grange, William. Cultural Chronicle of the Weimar Republic. Scarecrow Press, 2008.
