= Frasquita =

1934 film

- Directed by: Karel Lamač
- Written by: Charles Amberg; Georg C. Klaren; Heinz Reichert (libretto); A. M. Willner (libretto)
- Produced by: Reinhold Meißner
- Starring: Jarmila Novotná; Charlott Daudert; Heinz Rühmann
- Cinematography: Eduard Hoesch
- Music by: Franz Lehár (operetta); Willy Schmidt-Gentner
- Production company: Atlantis-Film
- Distributed by: Neue Deutsch Lichtspiel-Syndikat Verleih (Germany)
- Release date: 9 September 1934
- Running time: 84 minutes
- Country: Austria
- Language: German

Frasquita is a 1934 Austrian musical film directed by Karel Lamač and starring Jarmila Novotná, Charlott Daudert, and Heinz Rühmann. An operetta film, it is an adaptation of Franz Lehár's 1922 stage work of the same name. It was shot at the Sievering Studios in Vienna and on location in Sicily. The film's sets were designed by the art director Julius von Borsody.

== Cast ==
- Jarmila Novotná as Frasquita, the Gypsy singer
- Hans-Heinz Bollmann as Harald, the would-be groom
- Heinz Rühmann as Hippolit, his best man
- Charlott Daudert as Dolly
- Rudolf Carl as Karel, the butler
- Hans Moser as Jaromir – Harald's Valet
- Max Gülstorff as Graf Elemer
- Franz Schafheitlin as Juan – Frasquita's Gypsy Lover
- Franz Lehár as Conductor in credits sequence
- Choir of the Vienna State Opera as Singers
- Otto Schmöle
- Robert Valberg
- Gretl Wawra
- Wiener Sängerknaben as Themselves – Singers

== Bibliography ==
- Gregor Ball and Eberhard Spiess. Heinz Rühmann und seine Filme. Goldmann, 1982.
