= Niederrœdern =

Niederrœdern Níderreddere
- Commune
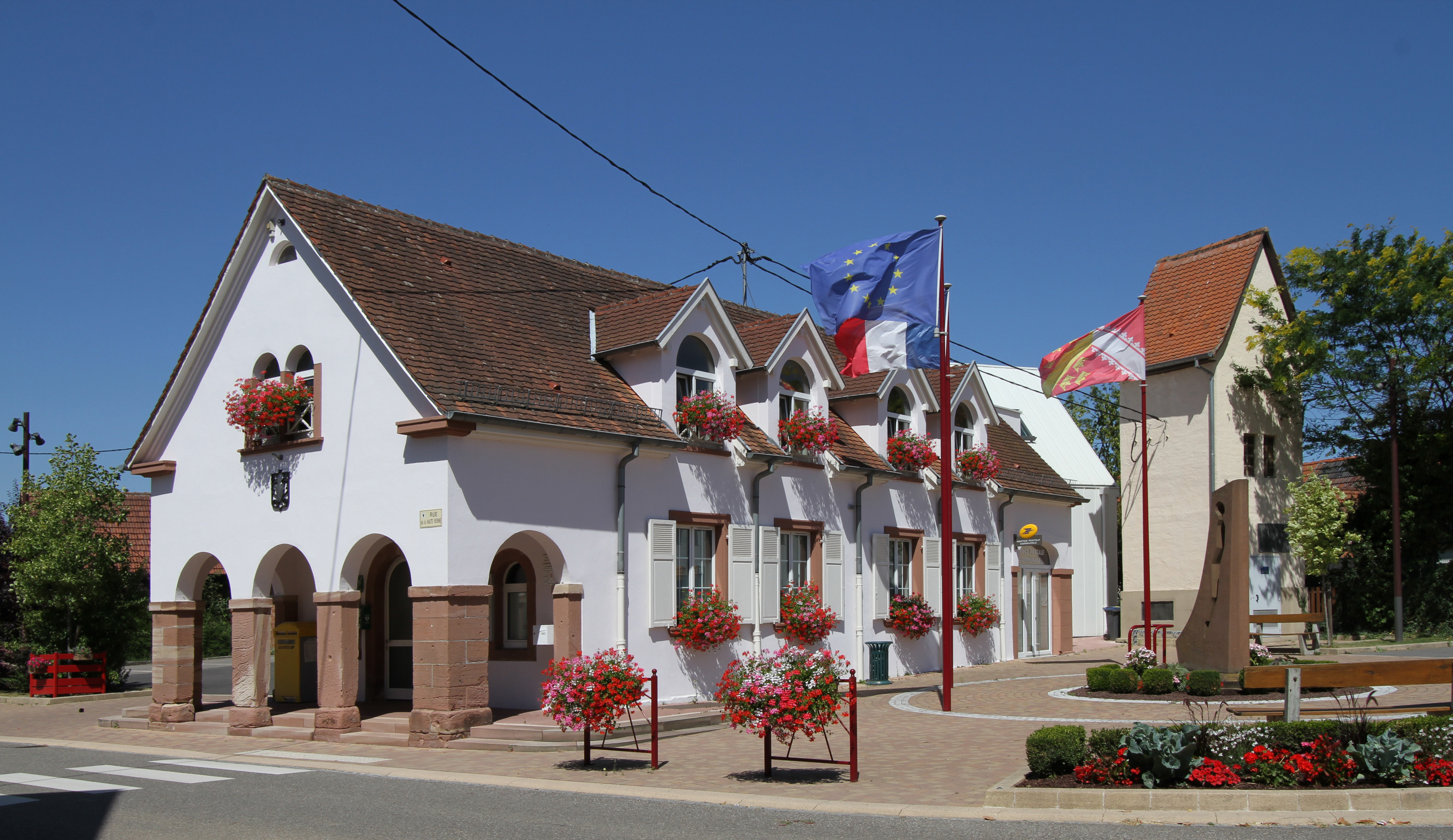
- The town hall in Niederrœdern

- Coat of arms
- Location of Niederrœdern
- Location within France Location within Grand Est
- Coordinates: 48°54′24″N 8°02′54″E
- Country: France
- Region: Grand Est
- Department: Bas-Rhin
- Arrondissement: Haguenau-Wissembourg
- Canton: Wissembourg

Government
  - Mayor (2020–2026): Denis Dion
- Area^{1}: 6.88 km^{2} (2.66 sq mi)
- Highest elevation: 193 m (633 ft)
- Lowest elevation: 119 m (390 ft)
- Population (2023): 886
  - Density: 129/km^{2} (334/sq mi)
- Time zone: UTC+01:00 (CET)
  - Summer (DST): UTC+02:00 (CEST)
- INSEE/Postal code: 67330 /67470
- ^{1} French Land Register data, which excludes lakes, ponds, glaciers > 1 km^{2} (0.386 sq mi or 247 acres) and river estuaries.

Niederrœdern (German: Niederrödern) is a commune in the Bas-Rhin department in Grand Est in north-eastern France.

== See also ==
- Communes of the Bas-Rhin department
