= Welcome and Farewell =

1775 poem by Johann Wolfgang von Goethe

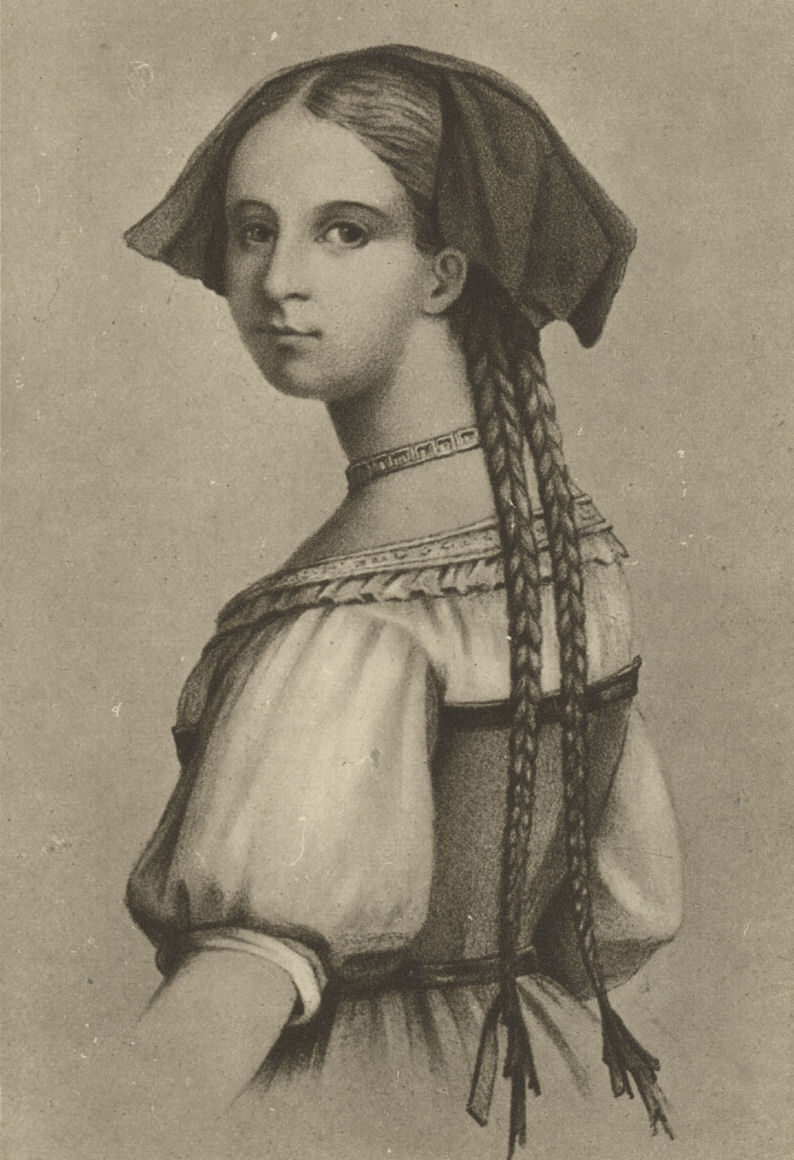
Friederike Brion

"Welcome and Farewell" (German: "Willkommen und Abschied") is a poem by Johann Wolfgang von Goethe from the collection Sesenheimer Lieder. It was published for the first time in 1775 in the women's magazine Iris. Franz Schubert set it to music as a lied (D.767).

== Origin and content ==
In 1770 Goethe went to Strasbourg and assumedly wrote the love song in the following spring of 1771. It was written in the spirit of the Sturm und Drang period for the daughter of a parson, Friederike Brion.

== Text ==
Es schlug mein Herz; geschwind zu Pferde!
Es war getan fast eh gedacht;
Der Abend wiegte schon die Erde,
Und an den Bergen hing die Nacht.
Schon stand im Nebelkleid die Eiche,
Ein aufgetürmter Riese, da,
Wo Finsternis aus dem Gesträuche
Mit hundert schwarzen Augen sah.

Der Mond von einem Wolkenhügel
Sah kläglich aus dem Duft hervor,
Die Winde schwangen leise Flügel,
Umsausten schauerlich mein Ohr.
Die Nacht schuf tausend Ungeheuer;
Doch frisch und fröhlich war mein Mut:
In meinen Adern welches Feuer!
In meinem Herzen welche Glut!

Dich sah ich, und die milde Freude
Floss von dem süssen Blick auf mich;
Ganz war mein Herz an deiner Seite,
Und jeder Atemzug für dich.
Ein rosenfarbnes Frühlingswetter
Umgab das liebliche Gesicht,
Und Zärtlichkeit für mich — ihr Götter!
Ich hofft' es, ich verdient' es nicht!

Doch ach, schon mit der Morgensonne
Verengt der Abschied mir das Herz:
In deinen Küssen, welche Wonne!
In deinem Auge, welcher Schmerz!
Ich ging, du standst und sahst zur Erden,
Und sahst mir nach mit nassem Blick:
Und doch, welch Glück geliebt zu werden!
Und lieben, Götter, welch ein Glück!

Quick throbb'd my heart: to horse! haste, haste
And lo! 'twas done with speed of light;
The evening soon the world embraced,
And o'er the mountains hung the night.
Soon stood, in robe of mist, the oak,
A tow'ring giant in his size,
Where darkness through the thicket broke,
And glared with hundred gloomy eyes.

From out a hill of clouds the moon
With mournful gaze began to peer:
The winds their soft wings flutter'd soon,
And murmur'd in my awe-struck ear;
The night a thousand monsters made,
Yet fresh and joyous was my mind;
What fire within my veins then play'd!
What glow was in my bosom shrin'd!

I saw thee, and with tender pride
Felt thy sweet gaze pour joy on me;
While all my heart was at thy side,
And every breath I breath'd for thee.
The roseate hues that spring supplies
Were playing round thy features fair,
And love for me—ye Deities!
I hoped it, I deserved it ne'er!

But, when the morning sun return'd,
Departure filled with grief my heart:
Within thy kiss, what rapture burn'd!
But in thy look, what bitter smart!
I went—thy gaze to earth first roved;
Thou follow'dst me with tearful eye:
And yet, what rapture to be loved!
And, Gods, to love—what ecstacy!

My heart beat fast, a horse! away!
Quicker than thought I am astride,
Earth now lulled by end of day,
Night hovering on the mountainside.
A robe of mist around him flung,
The oak a towering giant stood,
A hundred eyes of jet had sprung
From darkness in the bushy wood.

Atop a hill of cloud the moon
Shed piteous glimmers through the mist,
Softly the wind took flight, and soon
With horrible wings around me hissed.
Night made a thousand ghouls respire,
Of what I felt, a thousandth part
My mind, what a consuming fire!
What a glow was in my heart!

You I saw, your look replied,
Your sweet felicity, my own,
My heart was with you, at your side,
I breathed for you, for you alone.
A blush was there, as if your face
A rosy hue of Spring had caught,
For me-ye gods!-this tenderness!
I hoped, and I deserved it not.

Yet soon the morning sun was there,
My heart, ah, shrank as leave I took:
How rapturous your kisses were,
What anguish then was in your look!
I left, you stood with downcast eyes,
In tears you saw me riding off:
Yet, to be loved, what happiness!
What happiness, ye gods, to love!

== In music and film ==
The poem has been set to music as a Lied for voice and piano by Johann Friedrich Reichardt (1794), Franz Schubert (D 767; 1822), Hans Pfitzner (op. 29,3; 1922) und Winfried Zillig (1944).

In the 2010 German film Young Goethe in Love, the poem is being recited by the protagonist and its content plays a central role in the movie.
