= Manfred Lewandowski =

German Kantor and baritone

Manfred Lewandowski (1 September 1895 – 8 September 1970) was a German-American cantor, classical baritone and composer.

== Life ==
Born in Hamburg, Lewandowski came from a Jewish cantorial family. He was the great-nephew of Louis Lewandowski, the innovator of synagogue music in 19th century Germany, and was trained first by his father, then at the Vogt Conservatory; his vocal subject was the baritone. He performed as a synagogue singer at an early age. From 1921 to 1923 he was head cantor in Königsberg (East Prussia), from 1923 to 1928 at the Synagoge „Friedenstempel“ Halensee in Berlin-Halensee and from 1928 to 1938 head cantor at the Synagoge Lindenstraße in Berlin-Kreuzberg.

In addition to this activity in the field of Jewish liturgical singing, he was also a regular guest on the Funk-Stunde Berlin after the introduction of radio in Germany from 1924, where he performed synagogue songs on the microphone in addition to the classical repertoire. He also performed opera arias and songs on other radio stations in Germany.

During this time he also made numerous recordings on Electrola, Odeon and Homocord, including opera scenes (including duets with Hans Heinz Bollmann), songs and Jewish liturgical music. On Homocord, the organist Franz Doll and the pianist and Kapellmeister Dr. Felix Günther were his accompanists.

In the summer of 1938, he emigrated to France and from there to North America in 1939. He worked here as cantor at a New York synagogue 1939–1940, in Philadelphia 1940–1948, but continued to perform in synagogues until 1965.

In the US, he recorded religious music again in 1940 on the American Vox 'label'. He was also active as a composer, especially in the field of synagogue singing.

Lewandowski died in Philadelphia at the age of 75 and found his final resting place at Montefiore Cemetery, 600 Church Road, Jenkintown, PA 19046.

== Recordings ==
a) chasanut:

- Ki Keschimecho (M: Manfred Lewandowski)Kantor Emil Dworzan, Organist: Simon L. Steiner. Vox Nr. 17 (Matrix number 2004 A)
- Kol nidrei (Louis Lewandowski) Manfred Lewandowski, baritone. Odéon AA 53 101 / O-6271 (Matrix number xxBo 8695), recorded 1925/26
- dismarc-audio.org Kol Nidrei. Jüdische Melodie (Louis Lewandowski) Manfred Lewandowski, singing, m. Orgelbegleitung Franz Doll. Homocord Electro Fernaufnahme 4-8799 (mx. M 52 197)
- dismarc-audio.org Kaddisch (Maurice Ravel) Manfred Lewandowski, Bariton. At the grand piano Dr.Felix Günther. Homocord Electro Fernaufnahme 4-8799 (mx. M 52 198)

b) secular song:

- dismarc-audio.org Der Wanderer (Fr. Schubert) Manfred Lewandowski, baritone. Piano Dr.Felix Günther. Homocord Electro Fernaufnahme 4-8880 (mx. M 52 420)
- dismarc-audio.org Du bist die Ruh (Fr. Schubert) Manfred Lewandowski, baritone. Piano Dr.Felix Günther. Homocord Electro Fernaufnahme 4-8880 (mx. M 52 421)
- dismarc-audio.org Caro mio ben (Giordani) Manfred Lewandowski, baritone, with cello accompaniment Felix Robert Mendelssohn und Orgelbegleitung Franz Doll. Homocord Electro Fernaufnahme 4-8794 (mx. M 52 175)
- dismarc-audio.org Care selve, from Atlanta (G. Fr. Händel) Manfred Lewandowski, baritone, with cello accompaniment Felix Robert Mendelssohn und Orgelbegleitung Franz Doll. Homocord Electro Fernaufnahme 4-8794 (mx. M 52 176)
- Wachet auf ! (Franz Tunder) Manfred Lewandowski, baritone, with organ accompaniment Dr. Hans Luedtke. Homocord Electro 4-8857 (mx. M 52 314)
- From Jesaias 52-54 (Bernhard Heinrich Irrgang) Manfred Lewandowski, baritone, with organ accompaniment Dr. Hans Luedtke. Homocord Electro 4-8857 (mx. 52 315)
- youtube.com Duett "Der Tempel Brahmas strahlt" from Les pêcheurs de perles (G. Bizet) Hans Heinz Bollmann, tenor and Manfred Lewandowski, baritone, with Orchestra. Homocord Electro 4-8907 (mx. T.M. 52 483), aufg. End 1927, issued 27 August 1928

== Reissues ==
- Horst J. P. Bergmeier, Ejal Jakob Eisler, Rainer Lotz (Hrsg.): Vorbei... Dokumentation jüdischen Musiklebens in Berlin 1933–1938. Bear Family Records, Hambergen 2001. (Buch und 11 CDs).
- Edel (BMG): Es wird nicht untergehen. Jüdisch-liturgische Gesänge aus Berlin. BARBArossa Musikverlag, Kleinmachnow 1996. (1 CD, enth. Aufnahmen verschiedener Interpreten, darunter von Manfred Lewandowski Kiddusch, Kaddisch and El mole rachamim.)
