= Johann Senn =

Austrian political lyric poet (1795-1857)

Johann Chrysostomus Senn (1 April 1795, Pfunds – 30 September 1857, Innsbruck; pseudonym: Bombastus Bebederwa) was a political lyric poet of the Vormärz.

== Life ==
Johann Senn was the son of the freedom fighter, Franz Michael Senn.

He lived in Vienna from 1807 and attended the Akademische Gymnasium. He was a pupil of the Wiener Stadtkonvikt along with Franz Schubert. He later studied philosophy, law und medicine, none of which he managed to complete. He became a teacher to Baron Anton von Doblhoff-Dier.

From 1815, his interest in politics grew ever more strident. Members of his circle included his old schoolmate, the composer and songwriter Franz Schubert, the poet Johann Mayrhofer, the lawyer and later Redemptorist Franz von Bruchmann, the artist Leopold Kupelwieser and the doctor Ernst von Feuchtersleben.

In 1820, Senn was arrested because of rude behavior during a police visit and imprisoned for almost a year. He was then deported to Tyrol and never returned to Vienna.

He spent eight years there in military service, rising to the position of lieutenant. He was unable to enjoy a middle-class career and lived out the rest of his days in Innsbruck working either as a Tagschreiber or in the offices of regional administration.

== Works ==
His friend Franz Schubert, set his poems Schwanengesang (Swan Song) and Selige Welt (Blessed World) to music. Senn, who had only one collection of poetry published in his lifetime, became popular in Tyrol through his poem Der rote Tiroler Adler (The Red Tyrolean Eagle). It was used as national propaganda and later set to music. A street in Innsbruck has been named after him. Part of his work was published at the behest of Adolf Pichler und Moriz Enzinger, but most remains unpublished and virtually unknown to this day.

- Johann Senn: Gedichte (poems), Innsbruck, 1838.
- Adolf Pichler (Ed.): Glossen zu Göthe's Faust. Aus einem Nachlasse von Johann Senn, Innsbruck, 1862.
