= Maria Fein =

Austrian actress

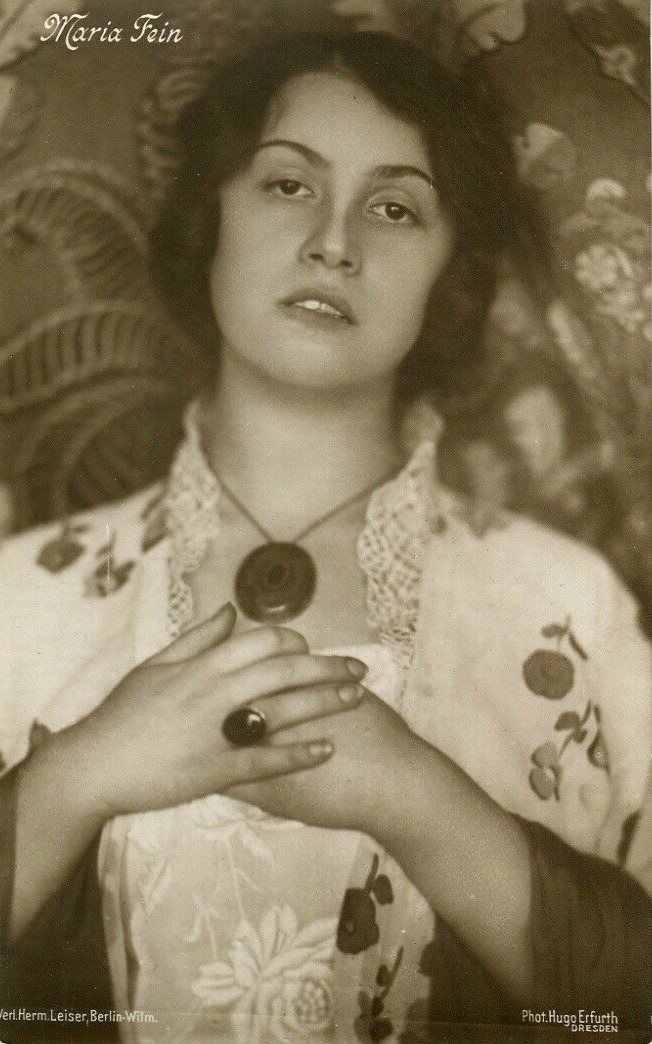
- Fein c. 1915
- Born: 7 April 1892; Vienna, Austria-Hungary
- Died: 5 September 1965 (aged 73); Zurich, Switzerland
- Occupation(s): Stage and screen actress
- Spouse: Theodor Becker (divorced)
- Children: 2

Maria Arloisia Fein (7 April 1892 – 5 September 1965) was an Austrian actress who became a star of German theatre and film before the rise of the Nazis forced her departure. During her time in Germany she was largely associated with the theatrical producer/director Max Reinhardt and acted in plays by such writers as Christian Friedrich Hebbel, Friedrich Schiller, William Shakespeare, Aeschylus, and Ferdinand Bruckner.

Between 1916 and 1932 Fein appeared in at least twenty-three German films working with pioneer movie directors Robert Wiene, Uwe Jens Krafft, Hanna Henning, Rochus Gliese, Walter Schmidthässler, Frederic Zelnik, Albert Lastmann, Paul Leni, Rudolf Walther-Fein, Michael Curtiz, Rudolf Meinert, and Fritz Friedmann-Frederich.

Following the Nazi annexation of Austria in 1938, Fein fled to the Netherlands and in 1941 found refuge for the duration of the war in Switzerland. Fein remained active on stage over the balance of her life in her adopted Switzerland and abroad until shortly before her death.

== Early life and family ==
Fein was born in Vienna to a Jewish family that reportedly at some point converted to Catholicism. She was the daughter of Fanny Süssermann and Otto Fein, editor of the Neue Freie Presse, and the older sister of Franz Fein, an author and translator of American novels.

Maria Fein married the German actor Theodor Becker with whom she had two daughters, Thea and actress Maria Becker (1920-2012). Fein’s marriage to Becker ended in divorce in the mid-1930s after a long separation.

Fein studied at the Academy for Music and Performing Arts in Vienna from 1909 to 1911 and made her professional debut at the National Theatre Mannheim, where she rose to play the title role in Hebbel's tragedy, Judith.

== Stage career ==
Over the next several seasons Fein appeared at the Royal Theater, Dresden, the Royal Theatre, Berlin and the Deutsches Theater, Berlin. Under the direction of Max Reinhardt, in October 1915 she played the title role in the Deutsches' production of Schiller's Maria Stuart. She continued in Berlin under Reinhardt’s directing in such parts as Ariel in Shakespeare's The Tempest at the Volksbühne, Elektra in Aeschylus' The Oresteia, Regan in Shakespeare's King Lear, both staged at the Großes Schauspielhaus, and in 1919 returned to the Deutsches playing Rebekka in Jaákobs Traum by Richard Beer-Hofmann.

Fein joined the Vereinigte Bühnen, Breslau for the 1921–1922 season and, between 1924 and 1926, performed at the Theater in der Josefstadt, Vienna, where in 1924 she played Lady Milford in Schiller's Kabale und Liebe. At the Deutsches she was Kudelka in the world premiere of Bruckner's Die Straf, staged by Heinz Hilpert. After her expulsion from the Ministry of Arts in 1935, Fein left for Vienna, where she performed at various theatres including the Burgtheater and Urania. At the latter venue appeared as Jocasta in Jean Cocteau's The Infernal Machine.

== Film ==
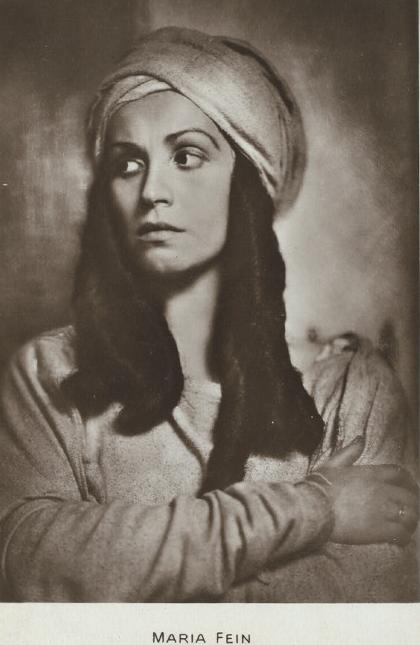
Fein as Rebekka in Jaákobs Traum, c. 1919

Fein’s film work in Berlin overwhelmingly occurred between 1916 and 1919; she appeared in just a handful of films after 1920. She began with the brothers Robert and Conrad Wiene in Der Mann im Spiegel and Das Leben ein Traum and went on to appear in mostly melodramas and the occasional comedy over the following several years. Her final film and only talkie was Frederica, a 1932 adaptation of the book by Ludwig Herzer and Fritz Löhner-Beda.

== Later career ==
After Nazi annexation of Austria, Fein appeared on stage in the Netherlands, France and Switzerland. Under the direction of Leopold Lindtberg, Fein appeared at the Schauspielhaus Zürich as Anisja in Leon Tolstoy's The Power of Darkness. Fein later returned to France, where she was detained until Maria Becker, by then a resident of Zurich, was able to secure her safe passage to Switzerland. Over the remainder of the war years Fein was active in Zurich giving evening recitations.

In 1945 Fein rejoined the ensemble of actors at the Schauspielhaus playing such characters roles as Ranjewskaja in Anton Chekhov's The Cherry Orchard, Sichle in the German language premiere of Paul Claudel's The Humiliation of the Father, a mother in Oscar Wilde's A Woman of No Importance, and the title role in Franz Grillparzer's Medea.

In 1948 Fein toured Switzerland with Heinz Woester in their adaptation of Somerset Maugham's Theatre, and the following year played Clytemnestra to the title role of Maria Becker in Jean Giraudoux's Électre. In a subsequent Swiss tour Fein played the title role in George Bernard Shaw's Mrs. Warren's Profession and at the Lucerne Festival revived her role as Jocasta in The Infernal Machine.

In 1951 Fein returned to Berlin to perform for the first time since the Nazi era. At the Schloss Charlottenburg she played Weisheit in Hugo von Hofmannsthal's Das Salzburger große Welttheater. During the early 1950s Fein toured England, France and Switzerland giving recitations and lectures and later appeared on BBC Radio in performances that included a 1956 radio play presenting an English-language adaptation of Bertolt Brecht's anti-war play, Mutter Courage und ihre Kinder.

In America Fein played Caroline of Brunswick to the Prince Regent of Walter Slezak in Norman Ginsbury’s The First Gentleman, but had left over creative differences by the time the show made its Broadway debut on 25 April 1957. The following year she was engaged to play Miriam in Christopher Fry's The First Born, but was replaced by Mildred Natwick a month before its 30 April debut on Broadway. Fein remained in the United States for several years giving one-woman shows called An Evening of European Theatre in which she performed scenes taken from plays by noted European playwrights.

== Final years ==
By 1961 Fein had returned to Switzerland, where at Basel she played the title role in Shaw's Mrs. Warren's Profession. In 1964 Fein told of her experiences in Berlin theaters prior to 1933 in a twelve episode documentary presented by the German network Norddeutscher Rundfunk.

Fein died at the home of Maria Becker in Zurich in 1965 at the age of 73.

== Selected filmography ==
- The Man in the Mirror (1917)
- Life Is a Dream (1917)
- Maria Pavlowna (1919)
- The Conspiracy in Genoa (1921)
- The Little Duke (1924)
- Das Spielzeug von Paris (1925)
- The Convicted (1927)
- Frederica (1932)
