= Sessenheim =

- Commune
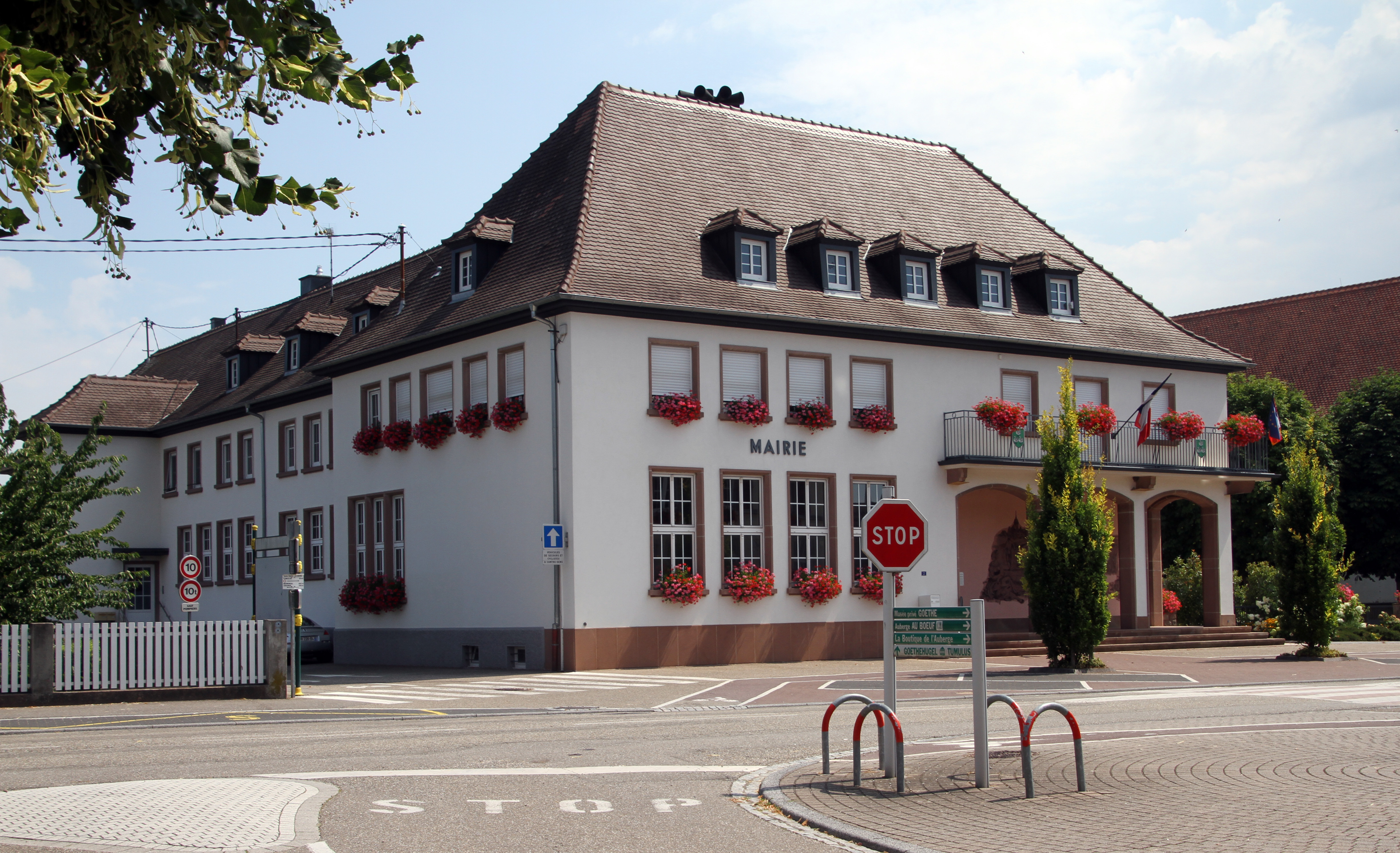
- Town hall

- Coat of arms
- Location of Sessenheim
- Location within France Location within Grand Est
- Coordinates: 48°48′N 7°59′E
- Country: France
- Region: Grand Est
- Department: Bas-Rhin
- Arrondissement: Haguenau-Wissembourg
- Canton: Bischwiller

Government
  - Mayor (2020–2026): Raymond Riedinger
- Area^{1}: 9.18 km^{2} (3.54 sq mi)
- Highest elevation: 122 m (400 ft)
- Lowest elevation: 118 m (387 ft)
- Population (2023): 2,342
  - Density: 255/km^{2} (661/sq mi)
- Time zone: UTC+01:00 (CET)
  - Summer (DST): UTC+02:00 (CEST)
- INSEE/Postal code: 67465 /67770
- ^{1} French Land Register data, which excludes lakes, ponds, glaciers > 1 km^{2} (0.386 sq mi or 247 acres) and river estuaries.

Sessenheim (French pronunciation: [sɛsənajm]; Alsatian: Sähsem) is a commune in the Bas-Rhin department in Grand Est in northeastern France.

== Population ==
Historical population
Year	Pop.	±% p.a.
1968	1,301	—
1975	1,482	+1.88%
1982	1,530	+0.46%
1990	1,542	+0.10%
1999	1,783	+1.63%
2007	2,026	+1.61%
2012	2,190	+1.57%
2017	2,315	+1.12%
2023	2,342	+0.19%
Source: INSEE

== Culture ==
Sessemheim was the setting for Johann Wolfgang Goethe's first love affair with Friederike Brion, a priest's daughter, which he immortalized in his Sesenheimer Lieder. This collection of poems was the foundation of his reputation as a poet.

== See also ==
- Communes of the Bas-Rhin department
