= List of German films of 1920 =

This is a list of the most notable films produced in the Cinema of Germany in 1920.

| Title | Director | Cast | Genre | Notes |
|---|---|---|---|---|
1920
| Abend - Nacht - Morgen (Evening - Night - Morning) | Friedrich Wilhelm Murnau | Conrad Veidt, Gertrude Welcker | | Presumed lost film IMDb |
| Algol (Algol - Tragödie der Macht) | Hans Werckmeister | Emil Jannings, John Gottowt | Sci-fi | |
| Anna Boleyn | Ernst Lubitsch | Henny Porten, Emil Jannings | Historical | |
| Anna Karenina | Frederic Zelnik | Lya Mara, Johannes Riemann, Rudolf Forster | Drama | |
| The Apache Chief | Fred Sauer | Friedrich Zelnik, Lya Mara | Comedy | |
| The Big Light | Hanna Henning | Hermann Böttcher, Wilhelm Diegelmann, Emil Jannings | Silent | |
| The Black Count | Otz Tollen | Olga Engl, Alfred Abel, Rudolf Klein-Rogge | Silent | |
| The Black Tulip Festival | Marie Luise Droop, Muhsin Ertugrul | Theodor Becker, Carl de Vogt, Meinhart Maur | Historical | |
| Blackmailed | Carl Boese | Gertrude Welcker, Ernst Deutsch | Crime | |
| The Cabinet of Dr. Caligari (Das Kabinett des Doktor Caligari) | Robert Wiene | Werner Krauss, Conrad Veidt, Lil Dagover, Friedrich Fehér | Horror/Expressionism | |
| Catherine the Great | Reinhold Schünzel | Lucie Höflich, Fritz Kortner | Historical | |
| Christian Wahnschaffe | Urban Gad | Conrad Veidt, Lillebil Ibsen, Fritz Kortner | Drama | Released in two parts |
| The Clan | Carl Wilhelm | Ressel Orla, Johannes Riemann, Conrad Veidt | Drama | |
| The Closed Chain | Paul L. Stein | Pola Negri, Aud Egede-Nissen | Silent | |
| Colombine | Martin Hartwig | Emil Jannings, Margarete Lanner | Silent | |
| Countess Walewska | Otto Rippert | Hella Moja, Rudolf Lettinger, Anton Edthofer | Historical | |
| The Curse of Man | Richard Eichberg | Lee Parry, Bela Lugosi | Drama | Released in two parts |
| The Dancer Barberina | Carl Boese | Lyda Salmonova, Otto Gebühr, Harry Liedtke | Historical | |
| The Dancer of Jaipur | Georg Bluen | Fern Andra, Ernst Rückert, Paul Rehkopf | Silent | |
| Diamonds | Friedrich Feher | Louis Ralph, Erika Glässner | Crime | |
| Der Einbruch | Harry Jaeger | | animation | |
| Dolls of Death | Reinhard Bruck | Albert Bassermann, Elsa Bassermann, Bernhard Goetzke | Crime | |
| Eternal River | Johannes Guter | Werner Krauss, Marija Leiko | Drama | |
| The Eyes as the Accuser | Fritz Bernhardt | Evi Eva, Heinrich Schroth, Bernhard Goetzke | Crime | |
| The Eyes of the World | Carl Wilhelm | Conrad Veidt, Ressel Orla | Silent | |
| Fanny Elssler | Frederic Zelnik | Lya Mara, Ernst Hofmann, Rudolf Forster | Historical | |
| The Face Removed | Franz Seitz | Heinrich Peer, Ernst Rückert | Crime | |
| The Forbidden Way | Henrik Galeen | Lupu Pick, John Gottowt | Silent | |
| From Morn to Midnight (Von morgens bis mitternachts) | Karlheinz Martin | Ernst Deutsch | Expressionism | |
| From the Files of a Respectable Woman | Franz Hofer | Margit Barnay, Olga Engl, Fred Immler | Comedy | |
| The Gallant King | Alfred Halm | Ria Jende, Eva Speyer | Historical | |
| Genuine: A Tale of the Vampire (Genuine) | Robert Wiene | Fern Andra, Hans Heinrich von Twardowski, John Gottowt | Horror | |
| The Girl from Acker Street | Reinhold Schünzel | Otto Gebühr, Lilly Flohr, Rosa Valetti | Drama | |
| The Golden Crown | Alfred Halm | Henny Porten, Paul Hartmann | Silent | |
| The Golem: How He Came Into the World (Der Golem, wie er in die Welt kam) | Paul Wegener | Paul Wegener, Albert Steinrück, Ernst Deutsch | Horror | See also: Golem |
| The Grand Babylon Hotel | E.A. Dupont | Hans Albers, Max Landa | Mystery | |
| The Guilt of Lavinia Morland | Joe May | Mia May, Albert Steinrück, Alfred Gerasch | Drama | |
| Gypsy Blood | Karl Otto Krause | Lya De Putti, Paul Hansen | Silent | |
| Hate | Manfred Noa | Tzwetta Tzatschewa, Ernst Deutsch, Rudolf Lettinger | Drama | |
| The Haunting of Castle Kitay | Paul Legband | Georg H. Schnell, Gustav Adolf Semler, Kurt Gerron | Drama | |
| The Head of Janus | Friedrich Wilhelm Murnau | Conrad Veidt, Magnus Stifter, Bela Lugosi | Drama | Based on Dr. Jekyll and Mr. Hyde; Presumed lost film IMDb |
| Hearts Are Trumps | Ewald André Dupont | Hermann Vallentin, Hans Mierendorff, Adele Sandrock | Drama | |
| Helmsman Holk | Rochus Gliese | Asta Nielsen, Paul Wegener | Drama | |
| Humanity Unleashed | Joseph Delmont | Eugen Klöpfer, Paul Hartmann, Carl de Vogt | Drama | |
| The Hunchback and the Dancer | Friedrich Wilhelm Murnau | Sascha Gura, John Gottowt | Horror | Presumed lost film IMDb |
| Hundemamachen | Rudolf Biebrach | Ossi Oswalda, Emil Biron, Ferry Sikla | Comedy | |
| The Hunt for Death | Karl Gerhardt | Lil Dagover, Kurt Brenkendorf | Silent | |
| The Hustler | Emil Justitz | Anita Berber, Hans Albers | Silent | |
| Hypnose | Richard Eichberg | Lee Parry, Bela Lugosi | | |
| Der Fluch der Menschheit - Im Rausche der Milliarden | Richard Eichberg | Bela Lugosi | | |
| Indian Revenge | Georg Jacoby, Léo Lasko | Georg Alexander, Mady Christians, Harry Liedtke | Adventure | |
| Intrigue | Paul L. Stein | Pola Negri, Eduard von Winterstein | Silent | |
| Johann Baptiste Lingg | Arthur Teuber | Carl Auen, Frida Richard | Historical | |
| Johannes Goth | Karl Gerhardt | Ernst Stahl-Nachbaur, Carola Toelle, Werner Krauss | Silent | |
| Judith Trachtenberg | Henrik Galeen | Leontine Kühnberg, Ernst Deutsch | Drama | |
| Kohlhiesel's Daughters | Ernst Lubitsch | Henny Porten, Emil Jannings | comedy | |
| Kri-Kri, the Duchess of Tarabac | Frederic Zelnik | Lya Mara, Johannes Riemann | Comedy | |
| Kurfürstendamm | Richard Oswald | Conrad Veidt, Asta Nielsen, Erna Morena | Drama | |
| The Kwannon of Okadera | Carl Froelich | Lil Dagover, Werner Krauss | Silent | |
| The Last Kolczaks | Alfred Halm | Victor Janson, Ellen Richter, Adele Sandrock | Drama | |
| Der Letzte der Mohikaner | Arthur Wellin | Bela Lugosi | | |
| The Law of the Desert | Fred Sauer | Bernhard Goetzke, Heinrich Peer | Adventure | |
| The Legend of Holy Simplicity | Joe May | Eva May, Alfred Gerasch, Wilhelm Diegelmann | Drama | |
| The Log of the U-35 | Hans Brennert | | Documentary | Available online here |
| The Love of a Thief | Martin Hartwig | Ellen Richter, Hans Adalbert Schlettow | Adventure | |
| Madame Récamier | Joseph Delmont | Fern Andra, Bernd Aldor | Historical | |
| The Marquise of Armiani | Alfred Halm | Pola Negri, Elsa Wagner | Silent | |
| Mary Magdalene | Reinhold Schünzel | Eduard von Winterstein, Ilka Grüning, Lucie Höflich | Drama | |
| Mary Tudor | Adolf Gärtner | Ellen Richter, Hans Adalbert Schlettow, Hanni Reinwald | Historical | |
| Mascotte | Felix Basch | Paul Biensfeldt, Hanni Reinwald | Silent | |
| The Masked Ones | Franz Seitz | William Dieterle, Karl Günther | Silent | |
| Masks | William Wauer | Albert Bassermann, Elsa Bassermann | Silent | |
| The Mayor of Zalamea | Ludwig Berger | Lil Dagover, Albert Steinrück, Agnes Straub | Drama | |
| Die Meister des Wassers | | | Documentary | |
| The Mistress of the World (Die Herrin der Welt) | Joe May | Mia May, Michael Bohnen | Adventure | |
| The Monastery's Hunter | Franz Osten | Fritz Greiner, Toni Wittels | Drama | |
| Monika Vogelsang | Rudolf Biebrach | Henny Porten, Paul Hartmann | Drama | |
| Moriturus | Carl Hagen | Max Landa, Reinhold Schünzel, Conrad Veidt | Crime | |
| A Murderous Midget Fish | | | Documentary | A short about piranhas. Available online here |
| My Wife's Diary | Paul L. Stein | Alfred Abel, Heinrich Schroth | Drama | |
| Napoleon and the Little Washerwoman | Adolf Gärtner | Ellen Richter, Rudolf Lettinger | Historical | |
| Nat Pinkerton im Kampf | Wolfgang Neff | Bela Lugosi | | |
| The Night at Goldenhall | Conrad Veidt | Conrad Veidt, Gussy Holl | Silent | |
| The Night of Decision | Franz Osten | Erich Kaiser-Titz, Grete Reinwald | Drama | |
| The Night of Queen Isabeau | Robert Wiene | Fern Andra, Fritz Kortner | Historical | |
| Nobody Knows | Lupu Pick | Eduard Rothauser, Edith Posca | Drama | |
| On the Brink of Paradise | Josef Stein | Carl de Vogt, Bela Lugosi | Adventure | |
| Panic in the House of Ardon | Robert Wiene | Stella Harf, Max Kronert | Crime | |
| Patience | Felix Basch, Paul Leni | Conrad Veidt, Adele Sandrock, Wilhelm Diegelmann | Silent | |
| The Princess of the Nile | Martin Zickel | Lya Mara, Julius Falkenstein, Lotte Stein | Silent | |
| Princess Woronzoff | Adolf Gärtner | Ellen Richter, Hugo Flink | Adventure | |
| The Prisoner | Carl Heinz Wolff | Harry Liedtke, Käthe Dorsch, Reinhold Schünzel | Drama | |
| Respectable Women | Carl Wilhelm | Ressel Orla, Heinrich Schroth, Olga Limburg | Drama | |
| The Revenge of Count Silvain | Willy Grunwald | Curt Goetz, Asta Nielsen, Ernst Hofmann | Comedy | |
| Romeo and Juliet in the Snow | Ernst Lubitsch | Lotte Neumann, Julius Falkenstein | Comedy | |
| Satanas | Friedrich Wilhelm Murnau | | | Presumed lost film |
| Schwarzwaldmädel | Arthur Wellin | Uschi Elleot, Carl Neisser, Ria Jende | Drama | |
| The Skull of Pharaoh's Daughter | Otz Tollen | Emil Jannings, Erna Morena | Silent | |
| The Song of the Puszta | Carl Boese | Grete Hollmann, Ludwig Rex, Karl Falkenberg | Silent | |
| The Sons of Count Dossy | Adolf Gärtner | Albert Bassermann, Elsa Bassermann, Gertrude Welcker | Drama | |
| Die Spinnen, 2. Teil - Das Brillantenschiff | Fritz Lang | | | Continuation from Die Spinnen, 1. Teil (see above) |
| Sumurun | Ernst Lubitsch | Ernst Lubitsch, Pola Negri, Paul Wegener | Drama | |
| Der Tanz auf dem Vulkan | Richard Eichberg | Bela Lugosi | | |
| Temperamental Artist | Paul Otto | Conrad Veidt, Aud Egede-Nissen | Silent | |
| Die Teufelsanbeter | | Bela Lugosi | | Considered to be lost |
| The Three Dances of Mary Wilford | Robert Wiene | Friedrich Feher, Erika Glässner | Drama | |
| Three Nights | Carl Boese | Otto Gebühr, Sybill Morel | Silent | |
| Die Todeskarawane | Josef Stein | Bela Lugosi | | Considered to be lost |
| The Tragedy of a Great | Arthur Günsburg | Carl de Vogt, Sybill Morel, Wilhelm Diegelmann | Historical | |
| Uriel Acosta | Ernst Wendt | Bruno Decarli, Margit Barnay, Leonhard Haskel | Historical | |
| Va banque | Léo Lasko | Fritz Kortner, Meinhart Maur | Drama | |
| The Voice | Adolf Gärtner | Albert Bassermann, Elsa Bassermann, Loo Hardy | Drama | |
| Der Wildtöter und Chingachgook | Arthur Wellin | Bela Lugosi | | |
| The Wandering Image | Fritz Lang | Mia May, Hans Marr | Romance | |
| The War of the Oxen | Franz Osten | Fritz Greiner, Lia Eibenschütz | Historical | |
| Whitechapel | Ewald André Dupont | Guido Herzfeld, Hans Mierendorff | Crime | |
| The White Peacock | Ewald André Dupont | Guido Herzfeld, Hans Mierendorff | Drama | |
| Wibbel the Tailor | Manfred Noa | Hermann Picha, Margarete Kupfer, Meinhart Maur | Historical comedy | |
| The Woman in Doctor's Garb | Rudolf Biebrach | Lotte Neumann, Felix Basch | Comedy | |
| The Woman in Heaven | Johannes Guter | Lil Dagover, Werner Krauss | Drama | |
| The Woman in the Dolphin | Artur Kiekebusch-Brenken | Bela Lugosi, Magnus Stifter | Silent | |
| The Woman Without a Soul | Léo Lasko | Edith Meller, Werner Krauss, Alfred Abel | Silent | |
| World by the Throat | Ewald André Dupont | Max Landa, Hanni Weisse, Ernst Rückert | Crime | |
| Das Wunder des Schneeschuhs | Arnold Fanck | | Documentary | |
| The Yellow Death | Carl Wilhelm | Eduard von Winterstein, Guido Herzfeld, Frida Richard | Thriller | |
| The Yellow Diplomat | Fred Sauer | Käthe Haack, Hermann Vallentin | Silent | |
