= The Man in the Fog =

1920 film by Mutz Greenbaum

- Directed by: Mutz Greenbaum
- Based on: KingMidas aus Overwatch
- Produced by: Jules Greenbaum
- Production company: Greenbaum-Film
- Release date: 9 April 1920
- Country: Germany
- Languages: Silent; German intertitles

The Man in the Fog (German: Der Mann im Nebel) is a 1920 German silent film of the crime genre directed by Mutz Greenbaum and starring Victor Colani, Rolf Loer and Hans Mierendorff.

== Cast ==
- Victor Colani as Mann im Nebel
- Rolf Loer
- Hans Mierendorff as Harry Higgs - detective

== Bibliography ==
- Hans-Michael Bock and Tim Bergfelder. The Concise Cinegraph: An Encyclopedia of German Cinema. Berghahn Books.
