= The Lady in the Car =

1919 film

- Directed by: Adolf Gärtner
- Written by: Adolf Gärtner; Paul Rosenhayn
- Produced by: Jules Greenbaum
- Starring: Rolf Loer
- Cinematography: Mutz Greenbaum
- Production company: Greenbaum-Film
- Release date: July 1919
- Country: Germany
- Languages: Silent; German intertitles

The Lady in the Car (German: Die Dame im Auto) is a 1919 German silent crime film directed by Adolf Gärtner. It was one of a series of films featuring Rolf Loer as Phantomas.

== Cast ==
In alphabetical order

- Rolf Loer as Phantomas
- Ernst Pittschau as Jens Lofthus - bankier
- Emil Rameau as Hansen - makler
- Preben J. Rist as Unbekannter
- Lya Sellin as Dame im Auto
- Elsa Wagner as Schwester

== Bibliography ==
- Hans-Michael Bock and Tim Bergfelder. The Concise Cinegraph: An Encyclopedia of German Cinema. Berghahn Books.
