= Professor Larousse =

1920 film

- Directed by: Mutz Greenbaum
- Written by: Mutz Greenbaum; Arthur Lippschütz
- Produced by: Jules Greenbaum
- Production company: Greenbaum-Film
- Release date: 6 September 1920
- Country: Germany
- Languages: Silent; German intertitles

Professor Larousse is a 1920 German silent crime film directed by Mutz Greenbaum and starring Victor Colani, Erwin Fichtner and Erich Kaiser-Titz.

== Cast ==
In alphabetical order

- Victor Colani
- Erwin Fichtner
- Erich Kaiser-Titz
- Rolf Loer as Phantomas
- Emmy Sturm

== Bibliography ==
- Hans-Michael Bock and Tim Bergfelder. The Concise Cinegraph: An Encyclopedia of German Cinema. Berghahn Books, 2009.
