= Lorenzo Burghardt =

1918 film by William Wauer

- Directed by: William Wauer
- Written by: Elsa Bassermann
- Produced by: Jules Greenbaum
- Starring: Albert Bassermann; Elsa Bassermann; Käthe Haack
- Production company: Greenbaum-Film
- Distributed by: UFA
- Release date: 13 December 1918
- Country: Germany
- Languages: Silent; German intertitles

Lorenzo Burghardt is a 1918 German silent film directed by William Wauer and starring Albert Bassermann, Elsa Bassermann and Käthe Haack.

== Cast ==
- Albert Bassermann
- Elsa Bassermann
- Emilie Croll
- Käthe Haack
- Paul Rehkopf

== Bibliography ==
- Grange, William. Cultural Chronicle of the Weimar Republic. Scarecrow Press, 2008.
