= Gertrude Reif =

Gertrude Reif may refer to:

- Gertrud Kanitz, Austrian actress
- Gertrude Reif Hughes, college professor in the United States
