= Vater und Sohn =

Vater und Sohn may refer to:

- Father and Son (1918 film), a 1918 silent film directed by William Wauer
- Father and Son (1929 German film), a 1929 silent film directed by Géza von Bolváry
- Father and Son (1930 film), a 1930 German-Swedish film directed by Victor Sjöström
- Father and Son (comics), comic figures created by E. O. Plauen
