= Doctor Sacrobosco =

1923 film

- Directed by: Josef Firmans
- Written by: Gustav Meyrink
- Cinematography: Artur von Schwertführer
- Production company: Filmindustrie und Lichtspiel
- Distributed by: Filmindustrie und Lichtspiel
- Release date: December 1923
- Country: Germany
- Languages: Silent; German intertitles

Doctor Sacrobosco (German:Dr. Sacrobosco, der große Unheimliche) is a 1923 German silent film directed by Josef Firmans and starring Adolf Böckl, Margit Piller and Käte Robert-Wenk.

== Cast ==
- Adolf Böckl
- Margit Piller
- Käte Robert-Wenk
- Wilhelm Diegelmann
- Victor Colani
- Georg H. Schnell
- Hans Ludolf
- Fritz Greiner
- Annie Gräsenau

== Bibliography ==
- Giesen, Rolf. The Nosferatu Story: The Seminal Horror Film, Its Predecessors and Its Enduring Legacy. McFarland, 2019.
- James Marriott & Kim Newman. Horror: The Definitive Guide to the Cinema of Fear. André Deutsch, 2008.
