= The Double Face =

1920 film

- Directed by: Mutz Greenbaum
- Written by: Mutz Greenbaum; Arthur Lippschütz
- Produced by: Jules Greenbaum
- Production company: Greenbaum-Film
- Release date: September 1920
- Country: Germany
- Languages: Silent; German intertitles

The Double Face (German: Das Doppelgesicht) is a 1920 German silent film directed by Mutz Greenbaum.

== Cast ==
- Rolf Loer as Phantomas

== Bibliography ==
- Bock, Hans-Michael; Bergfelder, Tim, eds. (2009). The Concise Cinegraph: Encyclopaedia of German Cinema. New York: Berghahn Books. ISBN 978-1-57181-655-9.
