= Doctor Schotte =

- Directed by: William Wauer
- Written by: Felix Salten
- Produced by: Jules Greenbaum
- Starring: Albert Bassermann; Elsa Bassermann; Käthe Wittenberg
- Music by: Giuseppe Becce
- Production company: Greenbaum-Film
- Release date: 30 August 1918
- Country: Germany
- Languages: Silent; German intertitles

Doctor Schotte (German: Dr. Schotte) is a 1918 German silent drama film directed by William Wauer and starring Albert Bassermann, Elsa Bassermann and Käthe Wittenberg. It was shot at the Weissensee Studios in Berlin.

== Cast ==
- Albert Bassermann
- Elsa Bassermann
- Käthe Wittenberg

== Bibliography ==
- Wedel, Michael. Pictorial Affects, Senses of Rupture: On the Poetics and Culture of Popular German Cinema, 1910-1930. Walter de Gruyter, 2019.
