= The Zaarden Brothers =

- Directed by: William Wauer
- Written by: Elsa Bassermann
- Produced by: Jules Greenbaum
- Starring: Albert Bassermann; Elsa Bassermann; Marija Leiko
- Production company: Greenbaum-Film
- Release date: 10 August 1918
- Country: Germany
- Languages: Silent; German intertitles

The Zaarden Brothers (German: Die Brüder von Zaarden) is a 1918 German silent drama film directed by William Wauer and starring Albert Bassermann, Elsa Bassermann and Marija Leiko.

== Cast ==
- Albert Bassermann
- Elsa Bassermann
- Marija Leiko

== Bibliography ==
- Bock, Hans-Michael & Bergfelder, Tim. The Concise CineGraph. Encyclopedia of German Cinema. Berghahn Books, 2009.
