= Michiko Tanaka =

Japanese singer & actress (1909–1988)

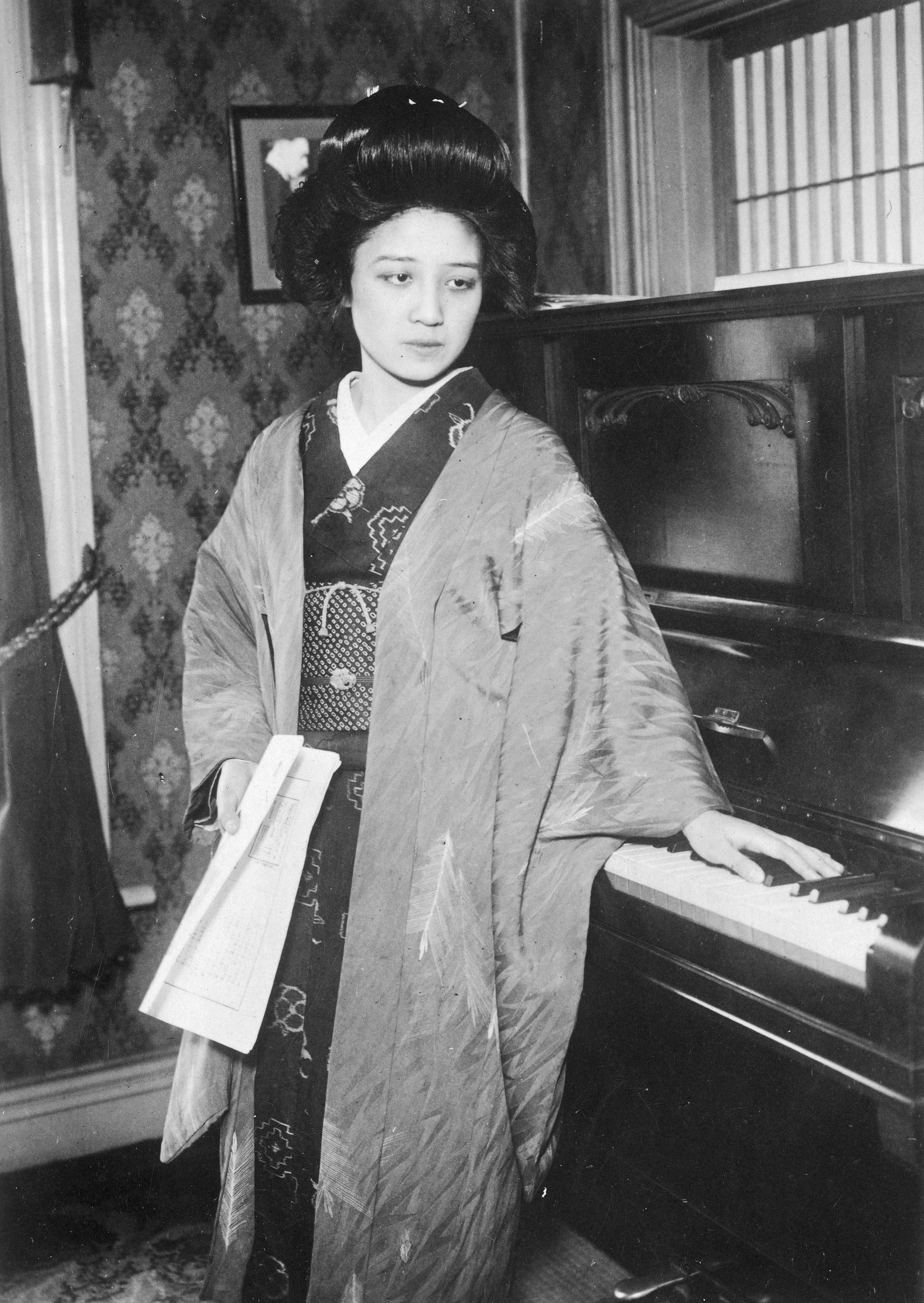
Tanaka c. 1925–1930

Michiko Tanaka (田中 路子, Tanaka Michiko; July 15, 1909 – May 18, 1988) was a Japanese singer and actress.

== Biography ==
Tanaka was born in Tokyo, the daughter of Tanaka Raishō. She studied music at the University of Music and Performing Arts Vienna.

She lived and worked mainly in Europe and US. She married German actor and singer Viktor de Kowa in 1939 and they were together until his death 1973. Tanaka died in Munich in 1988. Tanaka and Victor are buried in Friedhof Heerstraße, in an Ehrengrab donated by the city of Berlin.

== Selected filmography ==
- Dschainah, das Mädchen aus dem Tanzhaus (1935)
- Last Love (1935)
- Yoshiwara (1937)
- Storm Over Asia (1938)
- Scandal at the Embassy (1950)
- Madame Butterfly (1954)
- Girl from Hong Kong (1961)

== Bibliography ==
- Bacher, Lutz (1996). Max Ophuls in the Hollywood Studios. New Brunswick, NJ: Rutgers University Press. ISBN 978-0-8135-2291-3.
- Bock, Hans-Michael; Bergfelder, Tim, eds. (2009). The Concise Cinegraph: Encyclopaedia of German Cinema. New York: Berghahn Books. ISBN 978-1-57181-655-9.
- Sekikawa Fujiko (関川富士子) (n.d.). 田中路子――デコ伯母さんの思い出 [Michiko Tanaka – Memories of Aunt Deco] (in Japanese). Japanese–German Center Berlin. Archived from the original on 14 August 2024.
