= Yoshiwara (1937 film) =

1937 film

- Directed by: Max Ophüls
- Written by: Arnold Lippschitz; Wolfgang Wilhelm; Max Ophüls
- Based on: Yoshiwara by Maurice Dekobra
- Produced by: Samuel Epstein; Herman Millakowsky
- Starring: Pierre Richard-Willm; Sessue Hayakawa; Michiko Tanaka; Roland Toutain
- Cinematography: Eugen Schüfftan
- Edited by: Pierre Méguérian
- Music by: Paul Dessau
- Production company: Milo Film
- Distributed by: Compagnie Cinématographique de France
- Release date: 22 October 1937
- Running time: 102 minutes
- Country: France
- Language: French

Yoshiwara is a 1937 French historical drama film directed by Max Ophüls and starring Pierre Richard-Willm, Sessue Hayakawa and Michiko Tanaka. It is based on a novel of the same title by Maurice Dekobra. It was shot at the Joinville Studios of Pathé in Paris and on location at the Musée Albert-Kahn in Billancourt and in Rochefort-en-Yvelines and Villefranche-sur-Mer. The film's sets were designed by the art directors André Barsacq and Léon Barsacq.

== Synopsis ==
The film is set in the Yoshiwara, the red-light district of Tokyo, in the nineteenth century. It depicts a love triangle between a high-class prostitute, a Russian naval officer and a rickshaw puller.

== Reception ==
The film was Ophüls' greatest pre-war French financial success. Yoshiwara proved controversial in Japan where the government objected to the depiction of Japanese brothels and banned it. The two Japanese actors who had starred in the film faced a negative reaction, and were labelled as traitors.

== Cast ==
- Pierre Richard-Willm as Lieutenant Serge Polenoff
- Sessue Hayakawa as Ysamo, Kuli
- Michiko Tanaka as Kohana
- Roland Toutain as Pawlik
- Lucienne Le Marchand as Namo
- André Gabriello as Pô
- Camille Bert as Le commandant
- Foun-Sen as Geisha
- Philippe Richard as L'attaché russe
- Ky Duyen as L'agent secret
- Georges Saillard as Le médecin

== Bibliography ==
- Bacher, Lutz (1996). Max Ophuls in the Hollywood Studios. Rutgers University Press.
- Goble, Alan (1999). The Complete Index to Literary Sources in Film. Walter de Gruyter.
- Seigle, Cecilia Segawa (1993). Yoshiwara: The Glittering World of the Japanese Courtesan. University of Hawaii Press.
