= The Poisoned Stream =

1921 film directed by Urban Gad

- Directed by: Urban Gad
- Written by: Hans Behrendt; Bobby E. Lüthge
- Starring: Wilhelm Diegelmann; Carl de Vogt
- Cinematography: Mutz Greenbaum
- Production company: Corona Filmproduktion
- Distributed by: Terra Film
- Release date: 18 October 1921
- Country: Germany
- Languages: Silent; German intertitles

The Poisoned Stream (German: Der vergiftete Strom) is a 1921 German silent drama film directed by Urban Gad and starring Wilhelm Diegelmann, Hans Behrendt and Carl de Vogt.

The film's sets were designed by the art director Robert A. Dietrich.

== Cast ==
- Wilhelm Diegelmann as Abraham Fogg
- Emmy Denner as Mabel
- Hans Behrendt as Mr. Chester
- Erich Pabst as Mr. Rockforth
- Louis Brody
- Victor Colani as Mr. Hokker
- Carl de Vogt as Pirat Nr. 25
- Karl Etlinger
- Hans Geißler as Pirat Nr. 23
- Esther Hagan as Maud
- Max Hochstetter as Mr. Rowson
- Emil Stammer as Mr. Jonathan

== Bibliography ==
- Bock, Hans-Michael; Bergfelder, Tim, eds. (2009). The Concise Cinegraph: Encyclopaedia of German Cinema. New York: Berghahn Books. ISBN 978-1-57181-655-9.
- Grange, William (2008). Cultural Chronicle of the Weimar Republic. Lanham, MD: Scarecrow Press. ISBN 978-0-8108-5967-8.
