= The Nights of Cornelis Brouwer =

1921 film

- Directed by: Reinhard Bruck; William Wauer
- Written by: Ludwig Marr
- Produced by: Jules Greenbaum
- Starring: Albert Bassermann; Colette Corder; Rudolf Klein-Rogge
- Production company: Greenbaum-Film
- Release date: 4 March 1921
- Running time: 76 minutes
- Country: Germany
- Languages: Silent; German intertitles

The Nights of Cornelis Brouwer (German: Die Nächte des Cornelis Brouwer) is a 1921 German silent thriller film directed by Reinhard Bruck and William Wauer and starring Albert Bassermann, Colette Corder and Rudolf Klein-Rogge.The plot, about a respectable citizen who is taken over by a wild other self during nights on the town, is similar to that of Der Andere.

The film's sets were designed by the art director Robert A. Dietrich.

== Cast ==
- Albert Bassermann as Cornelis Brouwer
- Colette Corder as Tänzerin
- Rudolf Klein-Rogge
- Margarete Neff
- Max Wogritsch

== Bibliography ==
- Stephen Prince. The Horror Film. Rutgers University Press, 2004.
