= Rolf Loer =

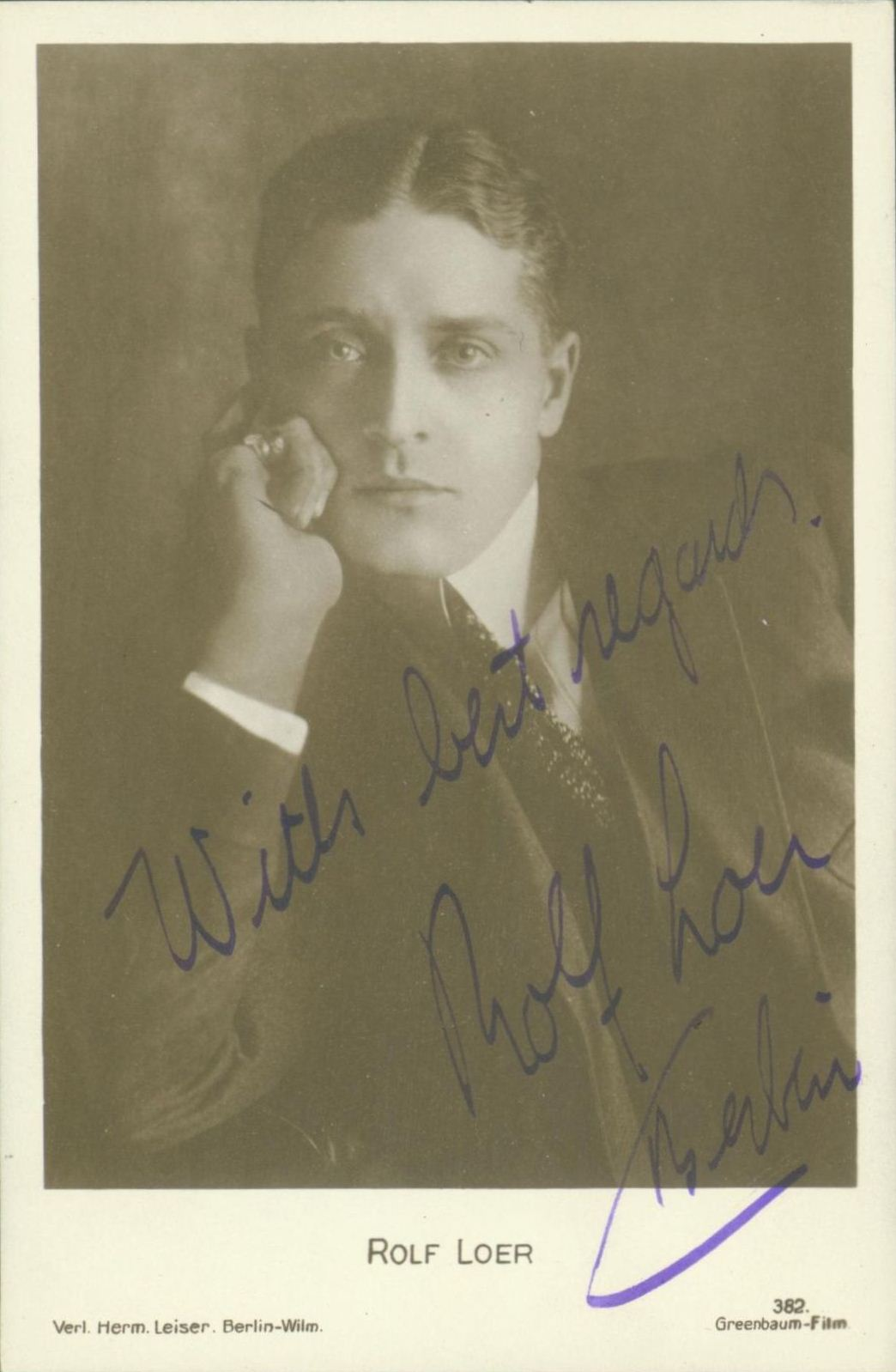
- Loer c. 1918
- Born: Lawrence F. Koehler; 19 January 1892; Minneapolis, Minnesota, United States
- Died: 12 October 1964 (aged 72); Jackson Heights, New York, United States
- Occupations: Actor, Violinist
- Years active: 1918-1925 (film)

Rolf Loer (born Lawrence F. Koehler; 19 January 1892 – 12 October 1964) was an American film actor of the silent era whose career was most prominent in German cinema. He played the character of Phantomas in a series of films, replacing Erich Kaiser-Titz who had previously played the role. Loer was also a violinist who, later in his career, performed with the Minneapolis Symphony Orchestra.

== Origins ==
He was born January 19, 1892, in Minneapolis, Minnesota, as Lawrence F. Koehler to German immigrant parents Friedrich Ernst Georg Koehler, a musician and conductor, and the former Magdalena Obert. His brother was the composer C. Franz Koehler. Showing promise in the violin, his father sent him to Germany to study at the Klindworth-Scharwenka Conservatory under the guidance of Arrigio Serato in 1909. He remained there to pursue his studies through the First World War.

== Death ==
He returned to the United States prior to the Second World War. He first played as violinist at the Minneapolis Symphony Orchestra, then moved to New York City, where he gave private lessons. He died in Jackson Heights, New York, on October 12, 1964. He is buried at the Flushing Cemetery.

== Selected filmography ==
- The Lady in the Car (1919)
- The Double Face (1920)
- The Man in the Fog (1920)
- Professor Larousse (1920)
- Destiny (1925)

== Bibliography ==
- Soister, John T. Conrad Veidt on Screen: A Comprehensive Illustrated Filmography. McFarland, 2002.
