= Desperate Journey =

1942 film by Raoul Walsh

- 1942 theatrical poster
- Directed by: Raoul Walsh
- Written by: Arthur T. Horman
- Produced by: Hal B. Wallis
- Starring: Errol Flynn; Ronald Reagan
- Cinematography: Bert Glennon
- Edited by: Rudi Fehr
- Music by: Max Steiner; Leo F. Forbstein
- Production company: Warner Bros. Pictures
- Distributed by: Warner Bros. Pictures
- Release date: September 25, 1942 (United States)
- Running time: 107 minutes
- Country: United States
- Language: English
- Budget: $1,209,000
- Box office: $3,980,000 (total) $2 million (US rentals); 2,458,390 admissions (France, 1949)

Desperate Journey is a 1942 American World War II action and aviation film directed by Raoul Walsh and starring Errol Flynn and Ronald Reagan. The supporting cast includes Raymond Massey, Alan Hale Sr., and Arthur Kennedy. The melodramatic film featured a group of downed Allied airmen making their way out of the Third Reich, often with their fists. (Note: The film marked the first time Flynn played an Australian on screen.)

Director Raoul Walsh called it "a war comedy spiced with enough tragedy to give it reality... beyond doubt the forerunner for Hogan's Heroes."

== Plot ==
During World War II, British Squadron Leader Lane-Ferris is badly wounded when a German interceptor attacks his bomber en route to a German railway junction at Schneidemühl. Flight Lt. Terrence Forbes assumes command and carries out the mission. The bombing is on target, but the plane is shot down and crashes near the former Polish border. Lane-Ferris dies soon after, and the five surviving crewmen—Forbes, American Flying Officer Johnny Hammond, Flight Sgt. Kirk Edwards, Flying Officer Jed Forrest, and Flight Sgt. Lloyd Hollis—are captured by the Germans.

Interrogated by Major Otto Baumeister, Hammond creates a distraction by explaining the bomber's design in technobabble before knocking the major unconscious. The airmen subdue the guards and search the major's office. They find documents describing the locations of six hidden Messerschmitt aircraft factories and resolve to get this intelligence back to England. Setting out on their desperate journey across enemy territory, they attack a patrol to obtain German uniforms and sneak onto a hospital train heading for Berlin. Reichsmarschall Göring's private car is at the end of the train, being transported for maintenance, and they hide in the empty car. They leave the train shortly before Berlin, where Baumeister is waiting for them, having travelled ahead by airplane.

The crew takes refuge in an abandoned building. While scouting for food, Forbes sees a chemical plant and decides to sabotage it. As the men flee the burning factory, a gunfight erupts and Hollis is wounded. With the help of a member of the underground, Kaethe Brahms, they see a doctor, but Hollis dies during surgery. Kaethe advises the crew to go to her hometown of Münster, where her parents will help them escape Germany.

The men reach the Brahms' house, but it is a trap; Kaethe's parents have been arrested and Gestapo agents have taken their places. The ruse is exposed when Kaethe arrives, but the police are already on their way. As the airmen and Kaethe escape across the rooftops, Edwards is shot and falls to his death. Forbes invites Kaethe to England, but she chooses to stay and keep working with the underground. The men cross into the German-occupied Netherlands in a stolen car, with Baumeister and his troops in pursuit.

The airmen elude Baumeister, but run out of petrol. A passing fuel truck leads them to a captured British Hudson bomber that is being prepared for a sneak attack on England. As they overpower the flight crew to steal it, Forrest is shot, but not mortally. With the airplane's guns, they hold the Germans at bay, killing Baumeister. Once airborne, they bomb a German gun battery on their way home.

== Cast ==
- Errol Flynn as Flight Lt. Terrence Forbes
- Ronald Reagan as Flying Officer Johnny Hammond
- Nancy Coleman as Kaethe Brahms
- Raymond Massey as Major Otto Baumeister
- Alan Hale Sr. as Flight Sgt. Kirk Edwards
- Arthur Kennedy as Flying Officer Jed Forrest
- Ronald Sinclair as Flight Sgt. Lloyd Hollis II
- Albert Bassermann as Dr. Mather
- Sig Ruman as Preuss
- Patrick O'Moore as Squadron Leader Lane-Ferris
- Felix Basch as Hermann Brahms
- Ilka Grüning as Frau Brahms
- Elsa Bassermann as Frau Raeder
- Charles Irwin as Captain Coswick
- Richard Fraser as Squadron Leader Clark
- Robert O. Davis as Kruse
- Henry Victor as Heinrich Schwarzmueller
- Bruce Lester as English Officer
- Lester Matthews as Wing Commander
- Ludwig Hardt as Pharmacist (uncredited)
- John Banner as Conductor on Empty Troop Train (uncredited)

== Production ==
The film was originally known as Forced Landing. It was written by Arthur Horman, who had done some uncredited work on the script for 49th Parallel (1941), notably scenes with Raymond Massey and Laurence Olivier. While there, he came up with the idea for a film about six English pilots escaping through occupied Europe, the reverse situation of 49th Parallel.

Vincent Sherman was considered to direct; he wrote to Hal Wallis saying he loved the central concept and thought the basic idea was good, but "its greatest weakness was it didn't have a story...once the men make their first escape you could very easily leave out every following sequence and simply go to the end without losing anything in so far as story is concerned".

Sherman was replaced as director by Raoul Walsh and the title was changed to Desperate Journey. Errol Flynn was meant to make Gentleman Jim for the studio, but they postponed it so he could star in Desperate Journey, instead. The movie was rushed into production to take advantage of America's recent entry into the war, which meant the problems in the script identified by Sherman were never really fixed.

Prior to and during filming, uncredited work on the script was done by Julius and Philip Epstein. Director Raoul Walsh said, "they have added a little zip to the script" and asked for them to keep working on it from a memo from Raoul Walsh to Hal Wallis dated February 13, 1942.

Principal photography on Desperate Journey took place from late January to early April 1942, filmed at the Warner Bros. studio, Lake Sherwood (Point Mugu and Point Hueneme) and Warner Ranch, Calabasas, California, backlots. Flying scenes were shot at the Van Nuys Metropolitan Airport. Warner Bros. was located in close proximity to the Lockheed aircraft plant, so was able to "borrow" a production Lockheed Hudson bomber for the film that was already destined for RAF use. The other aircraft that featured prominently in the film, mainly through a mock-up (shot on Warner's Sound Stage 16) and in model work, is the contemporary United States and RAF Boeing B-17 Flying Fortress bomber.

Ronald Reagan, an air force reservist before World War II, received his call for active service while the film was in production. (Note: Due to his poor eyesight, Reagan was classified as "limited service" and eventually was assigned to work on training films for the war effort.) While Warner Bros. lobbied the government for a 30-day extension, the U.S. Army was only willing to offer two weeks, forcing Walsh to shoot scenes with Reagan out of sequence, and to use a double for some scenes.

After beginning his film career, Reagan called himself the "B movie Errol Flynn", but in Desperate Journey, he shared top billing with Flynn. (Note: Contractually, Flynn's name appears above his, followed by "and Ronald Reagan.") He made the most out of the film's showcase scene, his fast-paced doubletalk in the interrogation by Massey. Flynn also lobbied intensely to get the scene, but despite a closed-door shouting match with director Walsh, the producer insisted that no changes to the script would be accepted.

Fresh from his acclaimed effort in Kings Row (1942), Reagan was at the high point of his career, making the transition from supporting to lead actor in studio features, and he was about to sign a seven-year contract with Warner Bros. In postwar years, Reagan's Hollywood career would never regain the same momentum as he had before he was called up for duty.

During production, Flynn's February 1942 draft-board physical revealed the presence of tuberculosis in his right lung. Unwilling to face an extended unpaid layoff, Flynn hid his condition from Warner Bros. Between his illness and Walsh's exacting schedule, as the shoot progressed, Flynn dropped to 165 pounds. His wardrobe first was refitted, and then ultimately padded. Due to illness, Flynn was often late. (Note: Although he was a pilot, studio regulations did not allow Flynn to do little more than sit in the cockpit or taxi an aircraft.)

== Reception ==
The film had its world premiere in Libertyville, Illinois, in a special screening to raise money for war bonds.

=== Box office ===
Desperate Journey went on to gross $2 million for Warners Bros., the third Flynn film of that year to reach that coveted mark, according to Variety. Studio bosses were aware the film was being screened during Flynn's rape trial, yet the negative publicity actually enhanced ticket sales.

According to Warner Bros. records, the film earned $2,029,000 domestically and $1,951,000 foreign.

=== Critical reaction ===
Despite its popularity at the box office, critical reviews were not positive. Bosley Crowther of The New York Times characterized the plot as basically similar to other, much better recent films, Target for Tonight (1941) and Man Hunt (1941). His review centered on the frenzy of the action. "And such hair-raising, side-splitting adventures as they have in a wild-goose trek across Germany — such slugging of guards and Raymond Massey, such chases and incidental sabotage you'll not see this side of the comics, or possibly an old-time Western film."

Filmink magazine said, "It's all done very much in Biggles mode, making the war seem like a game (several of the crew die, but it's similar to losing points in a video game)."

=== Awards ===
Desperate Journey was nominated for the Oscar for Best Special Effects (Byron Haskin and Nathan Levinson) at the 15th Academy Awards.

=== Home media ===
Desperate Journey was released on VHS Home Video in 1994. In the US, the film is issued as part of the TCM Spotlight: Errol Flynn Adventures Collection, Volume 2 (2010). In 2020, a new, separate DVD release was done under the Warner Bros. Archive Collection series.
