= Kurt Ehrle =

German actor (1884–1967)

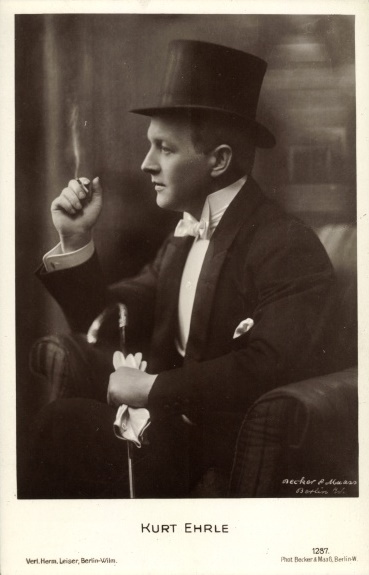
- Born: 26 May 1884; Leutkirch im Allgäu, Baden-Württemberg, German Empire
- Died: 17 April 1967 (aged 82); Saarbrücken, Saarland, West Germany
- Other name: Curt Ehrle
- Occupation: Actor
- Years active: 1918–1933 (film)

Kurt Ehrle (26 May 1884 – 17 April 1967) was a German stage and film actor.

== Selected filmography ==
- Put to the Test (1918)
- Agnes Arnau and Her Three Suitors (1918)
- Baccarat (1919)
- Satan (1920)
- The Woman Without a Soul (1920)
- Mascotte (1920)
- The Skull of Pharaoh's Daughter (1920)
- The Demon of Kolno (1921)
- The Sins of the Mother (1921)
- Sodom and Gomorrah (1922)
- Does a Woman Have to Become a Mother? (1924)
- The Duke of Reichstadt (1931)
- A Woman Branded (1931)

== Bibliography ==
- William B. Parrill. European Silent Films on Video: A Critical Guide. McFarland, 2006.
