= A Woman Branded =

1931 film

- Directed by: Eugen Thiele
- Written by: Eugen Thiele; Wolfgang Wilhelm
- Produced by: Edgar Röll
- Starring: Toni van Eyck; Elsa Bassermann; Hans Stüwe
- Cinematography: Viktor Gluck
- Music by: Leo Leux
- Production companies: Nowik & Roell-Film
- Distributed by: Süd-Film
- Release date: 16 April 1931
- Running time: 86 minutes
- Country: Germany
- Language: German

A Woman Branded or Dangers of Love (German: Gefahren der Liebe) is a 1931 German drama film directed by Eugen Thiele and starring Toni van Eyck, Elsa Bassermann and Hans Stüwe. It was shot at the Terra Studios in Berlin. The film's sets were designed by the art director Heinrich Richter.

== Synopsis ==
After a young woman is raped, she finds herself suffering from venereal disease. She takes revenge on the perpetrator by shooting him, before being forced to defend her actions in court.

== Cast ==
- Toni van Eyck as Ilse Thorn
- Elsa Bassermann as Frau Thorn, Ilses Mutter
- Hans Stüwe as Dr. Kurt Rehmann - Ilses Verlobter
- Albert Bassermann as Dr. Ringius, defense lawyer
- Hans Adalbert Schlettow as Verwalter Bodde
- Kurt Lilien as Dr. Wendel
- Veit Harlan as Ein Student
- Karl Klebusch as Geheimrat Rehmann
- S.O. Schoening as Professor Lehr
- Karl Junge-Swinburne as Vorsitzender des Schwurgerichts
- Kurt Ehrle as Prosecutor
- Ingolf Kuntze as Dr. Markow, prakt. Arzt
- Rudolf Weinmann as Professor Winterfeldt
- Ernst Hofmann as Assistenzarzt
- Gustav Püttjer as Gefängniswärter
- Charlotte Ziegler as Ilse Thorns Freundin

== Bibliography ==
- Klaus, Ulrich J. Deutsche Tonfilme: Jahrgang 1931. Klaus-Archiv, 2006.
- Noack, Frank. Veit Harlan: The Life and Work of a Nazi Filmmaker. University Press of Kentucky, 2016.
