= Last Love (1935 film) =

- Austrian film poster
- German: Letzte Liebe
- Directed by: Fritz Schulz
- Written by: Richard Arvay; Norbert Garai; Heinz Goldberg
- Produced by: Rudi Löwenthal; Erich Morawsky
- Starring: Albert Bassermann; Michiko Tanaka; Elsa Bassermann
- Cinematography: Willy Goldberger
- Edited by: Paul Falkenberg
- Music by: Franz Salmhofer; Richard Tauber
- Production companies: Wiener Film KG Morawsky & Company
- Distributed by: Kiba Kinobetriebsanstalt
- Release date: 28 February 1935
- Running time: 74 minutes
- Country: Austria
- Language: German

Last Love (German: Letzte Liebe) is a 1935 Austrian drama film directed by Fritz Schulz and starring Albert Bassermann, Michiko Tanaka and Elsa Bassermann.

The film's sets were designed by the art directors Artur Berger, Alfred Kunz and Emil Stepanek. It was shot at the Rosenhügel Studios in Vienna.

== Cast ==
- Albert Bassermann as Thomas Bruck
- Michiko Tanaka as Namiko Sanada, Japanese musical student
- Elsa Bassermann as Hanna von Hooven
- Hans Jaray as Walter, their son
- Hans Homma as Director of the Vienna Opera
- Fritz Imhoff as the host
- Oskar Karlweis as Teddy Langhammer
- Karl Paryla as Franz
- Etha von Storm as Susi Spangenberg
- Wiener Philharmoniker as Themselves - Orchestra

== Reception ==
Writing for The Spectator in 1935, Graham Greene reviewed the film favorably, describing it as having "a pleasant unpretentious air of truth about it", and suggesting to readers that "once accept the romantic plot and the rest is genuine: a creative career from a professional angle". Green praised the acting of Albert Bassermann and the "charming voice" of Michiko Meini.
