= Cadets (1931 film) =

1931 film

- Directed by: Georg Jacoby
- Written by: Alfred Schirokauer
- Based on: Hinter den roten Mauern von Lichterfelde by Peter Murr
- Produced by: Hermann Rosenfeld; Ludwig Scheer
- Starring: Albert Bassermann; Trude von Molo; Johannes Riemann
- Cinematography: Eduard Hoesch
- Edited by: Paul May
- Music by: Peter Kreuder
- Production companies: Efzet Film; Reichsliga-Film
- Distributed by: Heros Film
- Release date: 21 December 1931
- Running time: 111 minutes
- Country: Germany
- Language: German

Cadets (German: Kadetten) is a 1931 German drama film directed by Georg Jacoby and starring Albert Bassermann, Trude von Molo and Johannes Riemann. It was shot at the Berlin studios of Carl Froelich and on location at the Preußische Hauptkadettenanstalt in the city. The film's sets were designed by the art director Max Heilbronner.

== Synopsis ==
Rudolf, the son of General von Seddin, feels compelled to follow his father into the army and enlists in a military academy. However he struggles to focus as a cadet and becomes enamoured of his father's much younger second wife, his stepmother Helene. When he discovers that she is having an affair with an officer, matters escalate and he finds himself accused of murder.

== Cast ==
- Albert Bassermann as General von Seddin
- Trude von Molo as Helene von Seddin, seine Frau
- Franz Fiedler as Rudolf Seddin, Sohn
- Johannes Riemann as Rittmeister von Malzahn
- Ellen Schwanneke as Hilde, Rudolfs Jugendfreundin
- Friedrich Kayßler as Vorsitzender des Schwurgerichts
- Reinhold Bernt as Hennig, Bursche bei Rittmeister von Malzahn
- Elsa Bassermann as Gräfin Kleist
- Paul Otto as Oberst Berra
- Hans Zesch-Ballot as Oberleutnant von Brünning
- John Mylong as Hauptmann Müller
- Carl Balhaus as Kadettenunteroffizier von Zerbitz
- Erik Ode as Kadett von Brenken
- Gerhard Ritterband as Kadett Burig
- Paul Henckels as Verteidiger
- Walter Steinbeck as Staatsanwalt
- Alfred Beierle as Kommissar

== Bibliography ==
- Klaus, Ulrich J. Deutsche Tonfilme: Jahrgang 1931. Klaus-Archiv, 2006.
- Waldman, Harry. Nazi Films in America, 1933-1942. McFarland, 2008.
