= The Night Talk =

- Directed by: Adolf Gärtner
- Written by: Paul Rosenhayn
- Produced by: Jules Greenbaum
- Starring: Erich Kaiser-Titz; Reinhold Schünzel; Bruno Ziener
- Production company: Greenbaum-Film
- Release date: March 1917
- Country: Germany
- Languages: Silent; German intertitles

The Night Talk (German: Das Nachtgespräch) is a 1917 German silent crime film directed by Adolf Gärtner and Erich Kaiser-Titz, Reinhold Schünzel and Bruno Ziener.

== Cast ==
- Erich Kaiser-Titz as Phantomas
- Else Eckersberg
- Reinhold Schünzel
- Bruno Ziener

== Bibliography ==
- Bock, Hans-Michael & Bergfelder, Tim. The Concise CineGraph. Encyclopedia of German Cinema. Berghahn Books, 2009.
