= The Merry Wives of Windsor (1918 film) =

- Directed by: William Wauer
- Written by: William Shakespeare (play)
- Produced by: Jakob Beck
- Production company: Jakob Beck-Film
- Distributed by: Jakob Beck-Film
- Release date: February 1918
- Country: Germany
- Languages: Silent; German intertitles

The Merry Wives of Windsor (German:Die lustigen Weiber von Windsor) is a 1918 German silent comedy film directed by William Wauer. It is an adaptation of William Shakespeare's The Merry Wives of Windsor. As noted in the introduction of a recent edition of the play, the film "was , paradoxically enough, a silent film musical".

== Cast ==
In alphabetical order

- Gretl Basch as Frau Fluth
- Jacques Bilk as Herr Fluth
- Robert Blass as Falstaff
- Edwin Heyer as Cajus
- Luise Mark-Lüders as Frau Reich
- Ludwig Rex as Herr Reich
- Elisabeth Schott as Anna
- Harry Steier as Junker Spärlich
- Karl Tannert as Fenton

== Bibliography ==
- Eddie Sammons. Shakespeare: A Hundred Years on Film. Scarecrow Press, 2004.
