= The Confessions of the Green Mask =

1916 film directed by Max Mack

- Alfred Abel and Maria Orska
- German: Das Geständnis der grünen Maske
- Directed by: Max Mack
- Written by: Hans Brennert; Max Mack
- Produced by: Jules Greenbaum
- Starring: Alfred Abel; Reinhold Schünzel
- Cinematography: Mutz Greenbaum
- Production company: Greenbaum-Film
- Release date: 8 September 1916
- Country: Germany
- Languages: Silent; German intertitles

The Confessions of the Green Mask (German: Das Geständnis der grünen Maske) is a 1916 German silent film directed by Max Mack and starring Alfred Abel and Reinhold Schünzel.

The film's sets were designed by the art director Heinrich Richter.

== Cast ==
- Alfred Abel
- Reinhold Schünzel
- Maria Orska
- Paul Otto
- Heinz Sarnow
