= Der Januskopf =

1920 German film by F. W. Murnau

- Directed by: F. W. Murnau
- Screenplay by: Hans Janowitz
- Based on: Strange Case of Dr Jekyll and Mr Hyde by Robert Louis Stevenson
- Produced by: Lipowetzki; Erich Pommer
- Starring: Conrad Veidt; Magnus Stifter; Margarete Schlegel; Margarete Kupfer; Bela Lugosi
- Cinematography: Karl Freund; Carl Hoffmann
- Production company: Lipow-Film
- Distributed by: Decla-Bioscop AG
- Release date: 26 August 1920 (Berlin)
- Country: Germany

Der Januskopf (lit. 'The Head of Janus') is a lost 1920 German silent film directed by F. W. Murnau. The film was an adaptation of Robert Louis Stevenson's 1886 novella Strange Case of Dr. Jekyll and Mr. Hyde. Little is known about the film's production: it was shot and previewed under the title Schrecken (lit. 'Terror'), with shooting starting in either February or March 1920.

The film received great acclaim in Germany from trade publications and newspapers on its release, specifically noting the performance by Conrad Veidt. The film has been described by Bela Lugosi biographers Gary Rhodes and Bill Kaffenberger as being "among the most sought-after lost films" due to its initial critical acclaim. Robert Louis Stevenson researcher Steve Joyce described it as having an "all-star" film team of cinematographer Karl Freund, director F. W. Murnau and actors Conrad Veidt and Bela Lugosi.

== Plot ==
The Deutsche Kinemathek archive Lost Fims initiative describes a plot which resembles the Jekyll and Hyde story: Dr. Warren invents a serum that separates the evil and good sides of humanity. When he experiments on himself, his evil half becomes 'Mr. O'Connor', who commits several horrific crimes. Transformation back to Dr. Warren is possible using an antidote, but he is repeatedly attracted to the potion. Finally, the transformation begins to take place of its own accord. The antidote runs out, it is impossible to make more, and he can only transform to be Dr. Warren one last time. He confesses everything in a letter and kills himself, and again becomes Mr. O'Connor.

According to Rhodes and Kaffenberger, the surviving script for the film refers to Dr. Jeskyll [sic] who lives in London. Jeskyll purchases a bust in an antique store with two faces: one beautiful and one horrible. The bust obsesses Jeskyll, who attempts to give it away in an auction, only to buy it back.

Other sources combine the two plot versions, so that it is the influence of the bust of Janus on Warren that leads him to concoct the elixir separating his good and evil natures, resulting in O'Connor's horrendous crimes, and his eventual death, clutching the bust as he dies.

== Cast ==
- Conrad Veidt as Dr. Jekyll/Dr. Warren and Mr. Hyde/Mr. O'Connor
- Béla Lugosi as Dr. Jekyll's butler
- Magnus Stifter as Dr. Jekyll's friend
- Margarete Schlegel as Grace
- Margarete Kupfer as Jane

== Production ==
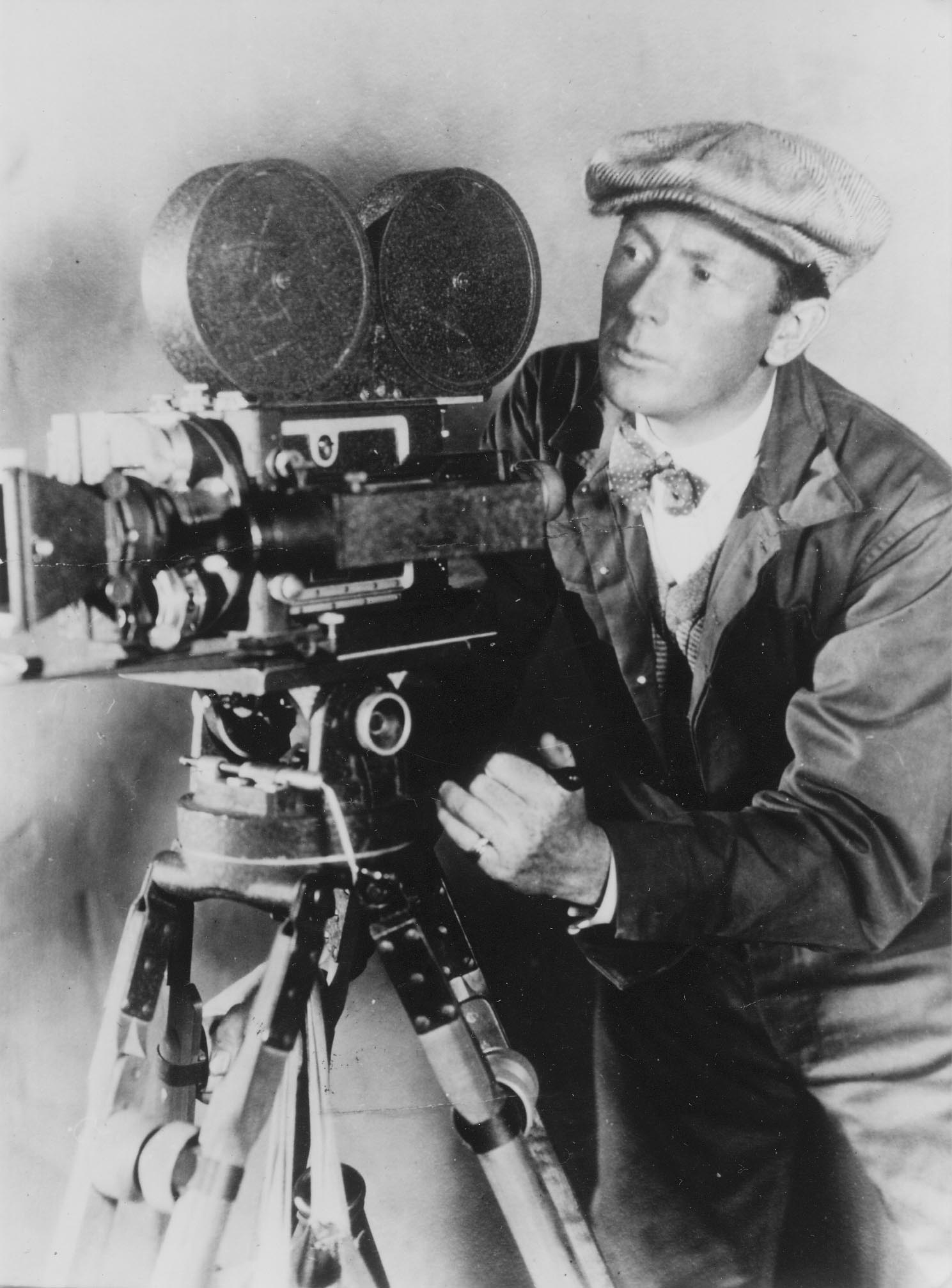
Director F. W. Murnau in 1920.

The film was developed under the name Schrecken (lit. 'Terror') and directed by F.W. Murnau at an early point of what authors Gary Don Rhodes and Bill Kaffenberger described as his "illustrious career in Germany and America." At this point, Murnau had only directed three feature films.

The film is based on Robert Louis Stevenson's novella Strange Case of Dr Jekyll and Mr Hyde (1886). The screenplay for the film was written by Hans Janowitz. Exactly when the film titled Schrecken was shot is hard to determine. One published production calendar suggests it was shot in late February 1920 but as the film's cinematographer Karl Freund was not reported as hired until 6 March, it is possible it was shortly later. Little is known about the film's production outside of an industry trade magazine later claiming that star Conrad Veidt had to "undergo training to be able to take his shaggy hair and turn it into something fashionable."

The surviving screenplay and additional production materials suggest that this work was the first in film history to introduce and utilise the "moving camera". In a scene where the doctor ascends the stairs to his laboratory, Janowitz writes the following sentence in his screenplay: "The camera follows him up the stairs."

== Release and reception ==
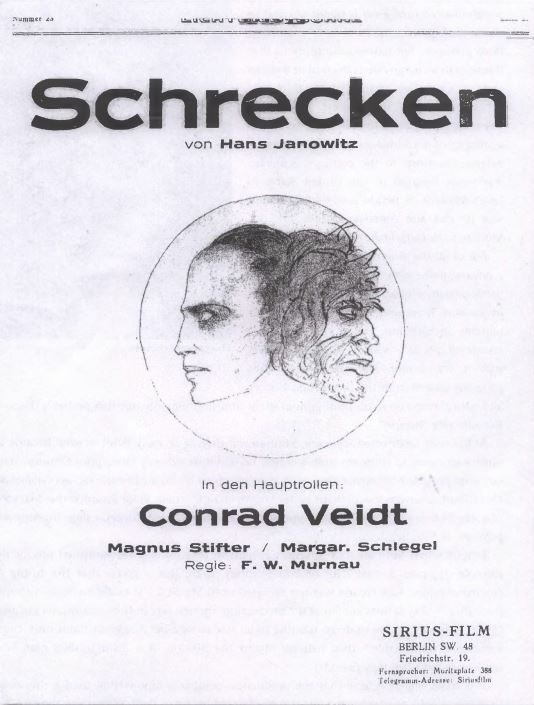
Advertisement for the film Der Januskopf under the title Schrecken in the magazine Lichtbild-Bühne, published 5 June 1920.

The film had a trade preview under the title Schrecken in late April 1920. According to a review from this period, the character's name is Jekyll rather than Jeskyll. On the trade preview from April 1920, the film received praise from publications Lichtbild-Bühne and Film-Kurier, both specifically noting Conrad Veidt's performance. Following a screening on 20 June, a critic in Neue Kino-Rundschau declared that the film "belongs to the best that German film art has produced. The direction by F.W. Murnau is a textbook example and Konrad [sic] Veidt gives an unsurpassed masterly performance."

The production company Lipow-Film struck a distribution deal with Decla-Bioscop due to the popular response to the previews. When Schrecken premiered at Berlin's Marmorhaus-Lichtspiele on 26 August 1920, it had a new title of Der Januskopf and was subtitled eine Tragödie am Rande der Wirklichkeit (lit. 'A Tragedy on the Border of Reality'). In this version, the characters of Dr. Jekyll and Mr. Hyde are changed to Dr. Warren and Mr. O'Connor respectively.

Following the film's premiere, Rhodes and Kaffenberger found the industry reviews to be "overwhelmingly positive", with Lichtbild-Bühne finding the film to be "a great success on account of its breathtaking suspense, and that Conrad Veidt is to be heartily congratulated for his unsurpassable, masterful performance", while Der Film stated it was "fabulously suspenseful", with "superb" acting and "excellent" cinematography. Another review in Erste Internationale Film-Zeitung went on to say the film recalled The Cabinet of Dr. Caligari and that "generally speaking, one can say that this new drama is equal to Caligari, and even outdoes it in a few gripping scenes", and that Veidt "has completely outdone himself – and all his previous performances."

Lichtbild-Bühne reported that the film was popular with German audiences, stating the film "has achieved widespread success, which we had predicted".

A reviewer in Der Kinematograph wrote,

The plot, entirely geared towards sensationalism, is gripping from beginning to end; the transformations, occurring, so to speak, on the spot, are a technical masterpiece of consummate effect. Here, film surpasses theatre. What is simply impossible on stage unfolds on the white screen with astonishing ease: the slender, intellectual face of Conrad Veidt, who plays Dr. Warren with brilliant mastery of the role, transforms almost imperceptibly into a repulsive, wildly hairy, stubbly grimace; the figure contorts, becoming a completely different person. Only a few close-ups, in which the makeup was too clearly visible, were somewhat distracting. Conrad Veidt has achieved fabulous virtuosity in portraying such bizarre characters and repeatedly surprises with new expressive possibilities. Alongside him, Willy Kaiser-Heyl, Magnus Stifter, Margarete Schlegel, and all the other actors were certainly on top form. Among the photographically excellent and scenically rich images, some blue-tinted, nighttime street scenes and studio shots with pretty lighting effects particularly stood out.

A reviewer in Der Film wrote:

To put it simply: This six-act play "after the English," adapted for the screen by Hans Janowitz, directed by Fred Murnau, and released by Decla-Bioscop, has a bright future and is one of the most powerful films of recent times. (...)

One excuses the improbabilities of the content and structure with subtitles; here: "A Tragedy on the Edge of Reality." Thus, one must accept the fantastical elements. Moreover, it has the advantage of creating fabulous suspense and is not inherently improbable. In addition, the acting is brilliant, the cinematography is excellent, the film is well-edited, technically sophisticated, and, apart from a somewhat lacklustre fifth act, handled with considerable taste.

Conrad Veidt plays Dr. Warren O'Connor, half himself, half Werner Krauss, yet very strong in his performance. The young Margarete Schlegel is also a real asset to the film, though still a touch too much in theatrical style. Magnus Stifter played the friend with understated elegance. Willi Kaiser-Heyl, Margarete Kupfer, and Danny Gürtler all delivered performances far exceeding their usual average fare.

All in all: Rare quality, yet a box-office success.

Despite some sources stating the film was released in the United States as Love's Mockery, that was actually the title for Murnau's later Der Gang in die Nacht (1921). It was released in the Netherlands under the title Het Geheim van Dr. Warren (lit. 'The Secret of Dr. Warren').

== Legacy ==
Rhodes and Kaffenberger stated the film was "among the most sought-after lost films". Steve Joyce discussed the urgency for the film to be found in his overview of silent era adaptations of Strange Case of Dr. Jekyll and Mr. Hyde, specifically the interest in grand contemporary reviews and an "all-star creative team", noting Veidt, Murnau, Freund and Bela Lugosi in a small role as a butler.

== See also ==
- List of German films of 1920
- List of lost films

== Bibliography ==
- "Der Januskopf". Filmportal.de. Archived from the original on 21 October 2025.
- Brauner, Ludwig (5 September 1920). "Der Januskopf". Der Kinematograph (in German). No. 714. Archived from the original on 12 September 2022 – via Filmportal.de.
- Eisner, Lotte H. (1973). Murnau (2 ed.). University of California Press edition. ISBN 0-520-02425-7.
- Joyce, Steve (2016). "The Obscure Cinematic Lore of Dr Jekyll and Mr Hyde: An Updated Silent Era Filmography". Journal of Stevenson Studies. 13. ISSN 1744-3857.
- Podehl, Fritz (4 September 1920). "Der Januskopf". Der Film (in German). No. 36. Archived from the original on 27 November 2023 – via Filmportal.de.
- Rhodes, Gary D.; Kaffenberger, Bill (2022). Becoming Dracula–The Early Years of Bela Lugosi (Kindle ed.). BearManor Media.
- Soister, John T. (2002). Conrad Veidt on Screen. McFarland & Company. ISBN 978-0786412891.
