= Women's Sacrifice =

1922 film

- Directed by: Karl Grune
- Written by: Imre Frey; Georg Kaiser (play)
- Produced by: Hanns Lippmann; Henny Porten; Wilhelm von Kaufmann
- Starring: Henny Porten; William Dieterle; Albert Bassermann
- Cinematography: Arpad Viragh
- Production companies: Gloria-Film; Henny Porten Filmproduktion
- Distributed by: UFA
- Release date: 15 February 1922
- Running time: 80 minutes
- Country: Germany
- Languages: Silent; German intertitles

Women's Sacrifice (German: Frauenopfer) is a 1922 German silent film directed by Karl Grune and starring Henny Porten, William Dieterle and Albert Bassermann. It was adapted from the play by Georg Kaiser.

The film's sets were designed by Paul Leni.

== Cast ==
- Henny Porten as Maria, Frau des Malers
- William Dieterle as Maler
- Albert Bassermann as Graf
- Ludwig Rex as Verwalter
- Frida Richard as Verwalter
- Edgar Klitzsch as Kunsthändler
- Adolf E. Licho as Alter Boheme

== Bibliography ==
- James Robert Parish & Kingsley Canham. Film Directors Guide: Western Europe. Scarecrow Press, 1976.
