= They May Not Marry =

1929 film

- Directed by: Carl Heinz Rudolph
- Written by: Carl Heinz Rudolph
- Produced by: Carl Heinz Rudolph
- Starring: Victor Costa; Olga Engl; Günther Laufer
- Cinematography: Franz Weihmayr
- Production company: Carl Heinz Rudolph Film
- Release date: 1929
- Country: Germany
- Languages: Silent; German intertitles

They May Not Marry (German: Die nicht heiraten dürfen) is a 1929 German silent film directed by Carl Heinz Rudolph and starring Victor Costa, Olga Engl, and Günther Laufer.

The film's sets were designed by Karl Machus.

== Cast ==
- Victor Costa as Franz Cornelius
- Olga Engl as Alice Cornelius
- Günther Laufer as Karl
- Colette Brettel as Eveline
- André Mattoni as Fritz Wendhausen
- Else Jera as Lilly Hildebrand
- Victor Colani as Emil Bloß
- Georgia Lind as Kitty
- Otto Kronburger as Dr. Falke

== Bibliography ==
- Krautz, Alfred (1984). International Directory of Cinematographers, Set- and Costume Designers in Film. Vol. 4. Munich: Saur. ISBN 978-3-598-21434-9.
