= Revenge for Eddy =

1929 film

- Directed by: Otz Tollen
- Written by: Jürgen Jancke
- Starring: Eddie Polo
- Cinematography: Max Grix; Willy Großstück
- Production company: Deutsche Spielfilm-Produktion
- Release date: 1929
- Country: Germany
- Languages: Silent; German intertitles

Revenge for Eddy (German:Rache für Eddy) is a 1929 German silent Western film directed by Otz Tollen.

== Cast ==
In alphabetical order

- Sándor Bihari as Jack Dodge
- Victor Colani as Inspektor Captain MacNelly
- Muriel Dawson as Stift
- Bernhard Förster as Der rote Ben
- Carl Geppert as Sheriff von Springwood O'Brien
- Kitty Hellens as Mary
- Mara Markhoff as Eine Mestizin
- Ernst Morgan as Bill Moore
- Eddie Polo as Sergeant Eddy Webster
- Magda Tausig as Ruth
- Otz Tollen as Davis Smith
- Ilse van Straaten as Janet
- Kurt von Möllendorff as Jimmy (Landreiter)

== Bibliography ==
- Kay Weniger. Lexikon der aus Deutschland und sterreich emigrierten Filmschaffenden 1933 bis 1945. ACABUS Verlag, 2011.
