= The White Death (film) =

1921 German silent drama film

- Directed by: Adolf Gärtner
- Written by: Willi Wolff
- Produced by: Willi Wolff
- Starring: Ellen Richter; Eduard von Winterstein; Hans Adalbert Schlettow
- Cinematography: Arpad Viragh
- Production company: Ellen Richter Film
- Distributed by: UFA
- Release date: 13 May 1921
- Country: Germany
- Languages: Silent; German intertitles

The White Death (German: Der weiße Tod) is a 1921 German silent drama film directed by Adolf Gärtner and starring Ellen Richter, Eduard von Winterstein and Hans Adalbert Schlettow.

== Cast ==
- Ellen Richter as Die kranke Tochter
- Eduard von Winterstein as der Vater
- Hans Adalbert Schlettow as Der Bräutigam
- Claire Creutz
- Gert Sascha

== Bibliography ==
- Bock, Hans-Michael & Bergfelder, Tim. The Concise CineGraph. Encyclopedia of German Cinema. Berghahn Books, 2009.
