= Agnes Arnau and Her Three Suitors =

1918 film

- Directed by: Rudolf Biebrach
- Written by: Robert Wiene
- Produced by: Oskar Messter
- Starring: Henny Porten; Hermann Thimig; Kurt Ehrle
- Cinematography: Karl Freund
- Music by: Giuseppe Becce
- Production company: Messter Film
- Distributed by: UFA
- Release date: 24 May 1918
- Running time: 68 minutes
- Country: Germany
- Languages: Silent; German intertitles

Agnes Arnau and Her Three Suitors (German: Agnes Arnau und ihre drei Freier) is a 1918 German silent comedy film directed by Rudolf Biebrach and starring Henny Porten, Hermann Thimig and Kurt Ehrle.

The film's sets were designed by the art director Ludwig Kainer.

== Cast ==
- Henny Porten as Agnes Arnau
- Hermann Thimig as Tonny
- Kurt Ehrle as Hans
- Artur Menzel as Rittergutsbesitzer Hermann von Hermanntitz
- Berta Monnard as Luise, seine Frau
- Rudolf Biebrach as Arnau, Gutsbesitzer
- Paul Westermeier as Schauspieler

== Bibliography ==
- Jung, Uli; Schatzberg, Walter (1999). Beyond Caligari: The Films of Robert Wiene. Berghahn Books. ISBN 978-1-57181-156-1.
