= Does a Woman Have to Become a Mother? =

1924 film

- German: Muß die Frau Mutter werden?
- Directed by: Georg Jacoby; Hans Otto
- Written by: Georg Jacoby
- Production companies: Ottol-Film; PAGU
- Distributed by: UFA
- Release date: 23 December 1924
- Countries: Austria; Germany
- Languages: Silent; German intertitles

Does a Woman Have to Become a Mother? or Paragraph 144 (German: Muß die Frau Mutter werden?) is a 1924 Austrian-German silent film directed by Georg Jacoby and Hans Otto and starring Harry Liedtke. Originally intended as a pro-abortion film, by the time it was released it was advocating the opposite view.

Does a Woman Have to Become a Mother? (1924) is a new edited version of Moral und Sinnlichkeit (1919).

== Cast ==
- Rolf Reinhardt as Dr. Unger
- Paul Otto as Dr. Weisse
- Kurt Ehrle as Fritz Hardt
- Käthe Dorsch as Else Hardt
- Hanna Ralph as Frau Derstner
- Erika Glässner as Margit
- Carl Auen as Kurt Wolf
- Harry Liedtke as Dr. Hellbrandt
- Hermann Thimig as Alfred Weng
- Ellen Blondys as Edith Kramer
- Margarete Kupfer as Frau Klumberger
- Artur Ranzenhofer as Dr. Heller
- Anny Ranzenhofer as arme Mutter
