= The Duke of Reichstadt (1931 film) =

1931 film directed by Viktor Tourjansky

- Directed by: Viktor Tourjansky
- Written by: Wolfgang Goetz; Adolf E. Licho; Pierre-Gilles Veber
- Based on: The Eaglet by Edmond Rostand
- Starring: Walter Edthofer; Lien Deyers; Grete Natzler
- Cinematography: Franz Planer
- Edited by: Andrée Danis; Tonka Taldy
- Production company: Les Films Osso
- Distributed by: Siegel-Monopolfilm
- Release date: 13 November 1931
- Running time: 90 minutes
- Countries: France; Germany
- Language: German

The Duke of Reichstadt (German: Der Herzog von Reichstadt) is a 1931 French-German historical drama film directed by Viktor Tourjansky and starring Walter Edthofer, Lien Deyers and Grete Natzler. It is the German-language version of the French film The Eaglet, based on the play L'Aiglon by Edmond Rostand. It takes its name from the formal Austrian title of Napoleon II, its central character.

It was shot at the Joinville Studios in Paris and on location around Vienna. The film's sets were designed by the art director Serge Piménoff.

== Cast ==
- Walter Edthofer as Herzog von Reichstadt
- Lien Deyers as Maria Louise
- Grete Natzler as Fanny Elssler
- Alfred Abel as Hofrat Gentz
- Kitty Aschenbach as Herzogin v. Parma
- Margarethe Hruby as Gräfin Camerata
- Eugen Klöpfer as Grenadier Flambeau
- Erwin Kalser as Kanzler Fürst Metternich
- Ekkehard Arendt as Major v. Prokesch
- Jaro Fürth as Kaiser Franz I.
- Eugen Jensen as Graf Sedlnitzky
- Eugen Burg as Graf Bombelles
- Kurt Ehrle as Marschall Marmont
- John Mylong as Tiburce de Lorget
- Hans Heinrich von Twardowski
- Alfred Beierle
- Gertrud Kanitz

== Bibliography ==
- Goble, Alan. The Complete Index to Literary Sources in Film. Walter de Gruyter, 1999.
- Klaus, Ulrich J. Deutsche Tonfilme: Jahrgang 1931. Klaus-Archiv, 1988.
