= The Last Witness (1921 film) =

1921 film

- Directed by: Adolf Gärtner
- Written by: Elsa Bassermann
- Produced by: Jules Greenbaum
- Starring: Albert Bassermann; Elsa Bassermann; Olga Engl
- Cinematography: Mutz Greenbaum
- Production company: Greenbaum-Film
- Release date: April 1921
- Country: Germany
- Languages: Silent; German intertitles

The Last Witness (German: Der letzte Zeuge) is a 1921 German silent film directed by Adolf Gärtner and starring Albert Bassermann, Elsa Bassermann and Olga Engl. It was shot in 1919, but not released until April 1921.

The film's sets were designed by the art director Hans Dreier.

== Cast ==
- Albert Bassermann
- Elsa Bassermann
- Irmgard Bern
- Olga Engl
- Friedrich Wilhelm Kaiser
- Meinhart Maur
- Fritz Moleska
- Frida Richard

== Bibliography ==
- Alfred Krautz. International directory of cinematographers, set- and costume designers in film, Volume 4. Saur, 1984.
