= Mutz Greenbaum =

German cinematographer (1896–1968)

- Born: 3 February 1896; Berlin, German Empire
- Died: 5 July 1968 (aged 72)
- Other name: Max Greene
- Occupations: Cinematographer, film director
- Parent: Jules Greenbaum

Mutz Greenbaum (3 February 1896 – 5 July 1968), sometimes credited as Max Greene or Max Greenbaum, was a German film cinematographer.

He was the son of the pioneering film producer Jules Greenbaum who had founded Deutsche Bioscope. He began as a cameraman in 1915, working on German silent movies, especially in association with directors Urban Gad, Max Mack, and Franz Hofer. Most of the time he worked for his father's company Greenbaum-Film GmbH in Berlin, even directing some detective films around 1920.

His career continued into the sound era, and he moved to England, working on such films as The Stars Look Down (1940), Hatter's Castle (1942), Thunder Rock (1942), So Evil My Love (1948), Night and the City (1950), and I'm All Right Jack (1959), usually credited as Max Greene.

Mutz Greenbaum left Germany in the early 1930's, signing with Gaumont-British as director of photography. During the succeeding decades, he worked on many classic films by leading producers Michael Balcon, Alexander Korda, and the Boulting Brothers. He was one of the pioneers in the British film industry in the use of low-key lighting and was one of the most sought-after cinematographers of the 1930s. His first solo credit for a British film was Hindle Wakes (1931, directed by Victor Saville).

== Selected filmography ==
- Hampels Abenteuer (1915)
- The Confessions of the Green Mask (1916)
- The Dancer Barberina (1920)
- The Voice (1920)
- Professor Larousse (1920)
- The Man in the Fog (1920)
- Blackmailed (1920)
- The Double Face (1920)
- Dolls of Death (1920)
- Masks (1920)
- Die Beichte einer Gefallenen (1921)
- The Poisoned Stream (1921)
- The Raft of the Dead (1921)
- The Last Witness (1921)
- Hashish, the Paradise of Hell (1921)
- Wildnis (1922)
- Alone in the Jungle (1922)
- The White Desert (1922)
- Count Cohn (1923)
- Wettlauf ums Glück (1923)
- The Vice of Gambling (1923)
- Christopher Columbus (1923)
- The Girl from Capri (1924)
- Prater (1924)
- Spring Awakening (1924)
- The Blonde Hannele (1924)
- The Creature (1924)
- Düstere Schatten, strahlendes Glück (1924)
- The Mistress of Monbijou (1924)
- Den of Iniquity (1925)
- The Marriage Swindler (1925)
- The Golden Calf (1925)
- Rags and Silk (1925)
- The Bohemian Dancer (1926)
- The Girl on a Swing (1926)
- Our Daily Bread (1926)
- The Circus of Life (1926)
- The Spinning Ball (1927)
- Tragedy of a Marriage (1927)
- Potsdam (1927)
- Orient (1928)
- Vienna, City of My Dreams (1928)
- The Republic of Flappers (1928)
- Pawns of Passion (1928)
- Who Invented Divorce? (1928)
- The President (1928)
- Their Son (1929)
- The Night of Terror (1929)
- Only on the Rhine (1930)
- Love and Champagne (1930)
- Two People (1930)
- The Great Longing (1930)
- There Is a Woman Who Never Forgets You (1930)
- Two Worlds (1930)
- Hindle Wakes (1931)
- A Gentleman of Paris (1931)
- 1914 (1931)
- The Forester's Daughter (1931)
- 77 Rue Chalgrin (1931)
- Sunshine Susie (1931)
- Love on Wheels (1932)
- The Faithful Heart (1932)
- It's a Boy (1933)
- The Constant Nymph (1933)
- Evensong (1934)
- The Untouched Woman (1934)
- Princess Charming (1934)
- Emil and the Detectives (1935)
- Bulldog Jack (1935)
- Oh, Daddy! (1935)
- Tudor Rose (1936)
- Non-Stop New York (1937)
- Return of the Scarlet Pimpernel (1937)
- The Green Cockatoo (1937)
- Old Iron (1938)
- We're Going to Be Rich (1938)
- Keep Smiling (1938)
- The Stars Look Down (1939)
- Under Your Hat (1940)
- An Englishman's Home (1940)
- This England (1941)
- Pimpernel Smith (1941)
- They Flew Alone (1942)
- Hatter's Castle (1942)
- Thunder Rock (1942)
- Squadron Leader X (1943)
- The Man from Morocco (1945)
- The Courtneys of Curzon Street (1947)
- Elizabeth of Ladymead (1948)
- So Evil My Love (1948)
- Spring in Park Lane (1948)
- Maytime in Mayfair (1949)
- Night and the City (1950)
- Odette (1950)
- Into the Blue (1950)
- The Lady with a Lamp (1951)
- Derby Day (1952)
- My Teenage Daughter (1956)
- Lucky Jim (1957)
- Brothers in Law (1957)
- The Moonraker (1958)
- I'm All Right Jack (1959)
- Carlton-Browne of the F.O. (1959)
- A French Mistress (1960)
- Suspect (1960)
- The Secret Ways (1961)
- Sparrows Can't Sing (1963)
- Heavens Above! (1963)
