= Dolls of Death =

1920 film

- Directed by: Reinhard Bruck
- Written by: Nikolaus Lenau (poem Die Marionetten); Reinhard Bruck
- Produced by: Jules Greenbaum
- Starring: Albert Bassermann; Elsa Bassermann; Bernhard Goetzke
- Cinematography: Mutz Greenbaum
- Production company: Greenbaum-Film
- Release date: 14 November 1920
- Country: Germany
- Languages: Silent; German intertitles

Dolls of Death (German: Puppen des Todes) is a 1920 German silent crime film directed by Reinhard Bruck and starring Albert Bassermann, Elsa Bassermann, and Bernhard Goetzke.

== Cast ==
- Albert Bassermann as Graf Robert
- Elsa Bassermann as Konstanze
- Bernhard Goetzke as Bildschnitzer Erasmus
- Georg H. Schnell as Lorenzo
- Gertrude Welcker as Grafentochter Maria
- Walter Rolfs as Lenau
- Rolf Prasch

== Bibliography ==
- Bock, Hans-Michael; Bergfelder, Tim, eds. (2009). The Concise Cinegraph: Encyclopaedia of German Cinema. New York: Berghahn Books. ISBN 978-1-57181-655-9.
