= Father and Son (1918 film) =

- Directed by: William Wauer
- Written by: Elsa Bassermann
- Produced by: Jules Greenbaum
- Starring: Albert Bassermann; Elsa Bassermann; Gertrud Kanitz
- Music by: Giuseppe Becce
- Production company: Greenbaum-Film
- Release date: 26 July 1918
- Country: Germany
- Languages: Silent; German intertitles

Father and Son (German: Vater und Sohn) is a 1918 German silent drama film directed by William Wauer and starring Albert Bassermann, Elsa Bassermann and Gertrud Kanitz.

== Cast ==
- Albert Bassermann
- Elsa Bassermann
- Gertrud Kanitz

== Bibliography ==
- Bock, Hans-Michael & Bergfelder, Tim. The Concise CineGraph. Encyclopedia of German Cinema. Berghahn Books, 2009.
