= Masks (1920 film) =

1920 film

- Directed by: William Wauer
- Written by: Elsa Bassermann
- Starring: Albert Bassermann; Elsa Bassermann
- Cinematography: Mutz Greenbaum
- Production company: Greenbaum-Film
- Release date: 12 September 1920
- Country: Germany
- Languages: Silent; German intertitles

Masks (German: Masken) is a 1920 German silent film directed by William Wauer and starring Albert Bassermann and Elsa Bassermann. It was part of a group of expressionist films released during the period.

The film's sets were designed by the art directors Robert Herlth and Walter Röhrig.

== Cast ==
- Albert Bassermann
- Elsa Bassermann
- Kurt Keller-Nebri
- Albert Paul
- Rolf Prasch
- Maat St. Clair
- Rose Veldtkirch

== Bibliography ==
- Bock, Hans-Michael & Bergfelder, Tim. The Concise Cinegraph: Encyclopaedia of German Cinema. Berghahn Books, 2009.
