= The Sons of Count Dossy =

1920 film

- Directed by: Adolf Gärtner
- Written by: Elsa Bassermann
- Produced by: Jules Greenbaum
- Starring: Albert Bassermann; Elsa Bassermann; Gertrude Welcker
- Production company: Greenbaum-Film
- Distributed by: UFA
- Release date: 7 May 1920
- Country: Germany
- Languages: Silent; German intertitles

The Sons of Count Dossy (German: Die Söhne des Grafen Dossy) is a 1920 German silent drama film directed by Adolf Gärtner and starring Albert Bassermann, Elsa Bassermann and Gertrude Welcker.

It was shot at the Weissensee Studios in Berlin.

== Cast ==
- Albert Bassermann as Graf / Einbrecher Sohn
- Elsa Bassermann as Gräfin
- Gertrude Welcker as Malerin

== Bibliography ==
- Hans-Michael Bock & Michael Töteberg. Das Ufa-Buch. Zweitausendeins, 1992.
