= The Voice (1920 film) =

1920 film

- Directed by: Adolf Gärtner
- Written by: Elsa Bassermann
- Produced by: Jules Greenbaum
- Starring: Albert Bassermann; Elsa Bassermann; Loo Hardy
- Cinematography: Mutz Greenbaum
- Production company: Greenbaum-Film
- Distributed by: UFA
- Release date: March 1920
- Country: Germany
- Languages: Silent; German intertitles

The Voice (German: Die Stimme) is a 1920 German silent drama film directed by Adolf Gärtner and starring Albert Bassermann, Elsa Bassermann and Loo Hardy.

The film's sets were designed by the art director Hans Dreier.

== Cast ==
- Albert Bassermann
- Elsa Bassermann
- Loo Hardy
- Hermann Leffler
- Charlotte Schultz
- Gerhard Tandar
- Hella Thornegg

== Bibliography ==
- Grange, William. Cultural Chronicle of the Weimar Republic. Scarecrow Press, 2008.
