= Christopher Columbus (1923 film) =

1923 film directed by Márton Garas

- Directed by: Márton Garas
- Starring: Albert Bassermann; Elsa Bassermann; Tamara Duvan; Imre Pethes
- Cinematography: Karl Attenberger; Mutz Greenbaum; Eugen Hamm
- Production company: Filmhandel
- Release date: February 1923
- Country: Germany
- Languages: Silent; German intertitles

Christopher Columbus (German: Christoph Columbus) is a 1923 German silent historical film directed by Márton Garas and starring Albert Bassermann, Elsa Bassermann and Tamara Duvan. It depicts the Discovery of America by the Italian explorer Christopher Columbus in 1492.

== Cast ==
In alphabetical order

- Albert Bassermann - Columbus
- Elsa Bassermann - Columbus's wife
- Tamara Duvan - Queen Isabella
- Arpad Odry
- Imre Pethes - King Ferdinand II.
- Ludwig Rethey - Guardian of La Rábida
- Ernst Stahl-Nachbaur - Duke of Medina-Celli
- Ferenc Szécsi - Diego
- Carola Toelle - Maria, Tochter des Herzogs

== Bibliography ==
- Bergfelder, Tim & Bock, Hans-Michael. The Concise Cinegraph: Encyclopedia of German. Berghahn Books, 2009.
