= Jules Greenbaum =

German film producer

- Born: Julius Grünbaum; 15 January 1867; Berlin, Kingdom of Prussia
- Died: 1 November 1924 (aged 57); Berlin, Weimar Republic
- Occupation: Film producer
- Years active: 1899–1921
- Spouse: Emma Karstein
- Children: Mutz Greenbaum

Jules Greenbaum (5 January 1867 – 1 November 1924) was a German pioneering film producer. He founded the production companies Deutsche Bioscope, Deutsche Vitascope and Greenbaum-Film and was a dominant figure in German cinema in the years before the First World War. He is also known for his early experiments with sound films around twenty years before the success of The Jazz Singer made them a more established feature of cinema.

== Early career and Deutsche Bioscope ==
Greenbaum was born in Berlin on January 15, 1867, as Julius Grünbaum. He was Jewish and his ancestors may have immigrated from Hungary to Berlin. He married Emma Karstein in c1887 and moved to Chicago in the United States, where his first son Georg was born 1 November 1889. He worked in the textile industry.

On his return to Berlin in 1895 aged around 42, Greenbaum moved into the newly established film business and founded Deutsche Bioscope (German: Deutsche Bioskop) in 1899. This name has various contemporary spellings, including Bioscope, Bioskope and Bioskop. Greenbaum acquired a camera in Amsterdam, and a cameraman, Georg Furkel. Furkel worked as his technical director until 1912, along with another Dutch cameraman, Martin Knoop.

Deutsche Bioscope's first independent film was the 60-metre 1899 newsreel picture Spring Parade featuring German Kaiser Wilhelm II. His firm released more newsreels in 1901/02, importing American and French features and manufacturing cinema equipment.

Deutsche Bioscope GmbH, Berlin, was incorporated on 18 June 1902 with a capital of 20,000 marks The main offices were at 131d Friedrichstraße, where the firm supplied equipment (including the American Biograph camera), and an 8-hour guaranteed film copying service. Bioscope's cameramen were sent to Vienna, Munich, Leipzig, Halle, Nuremberg, Kiel, Hamburg, Poznan, Lviv and Riga in search of vaudeville/variety acts to film.

=== Studios at 123 Chausseestraße ===
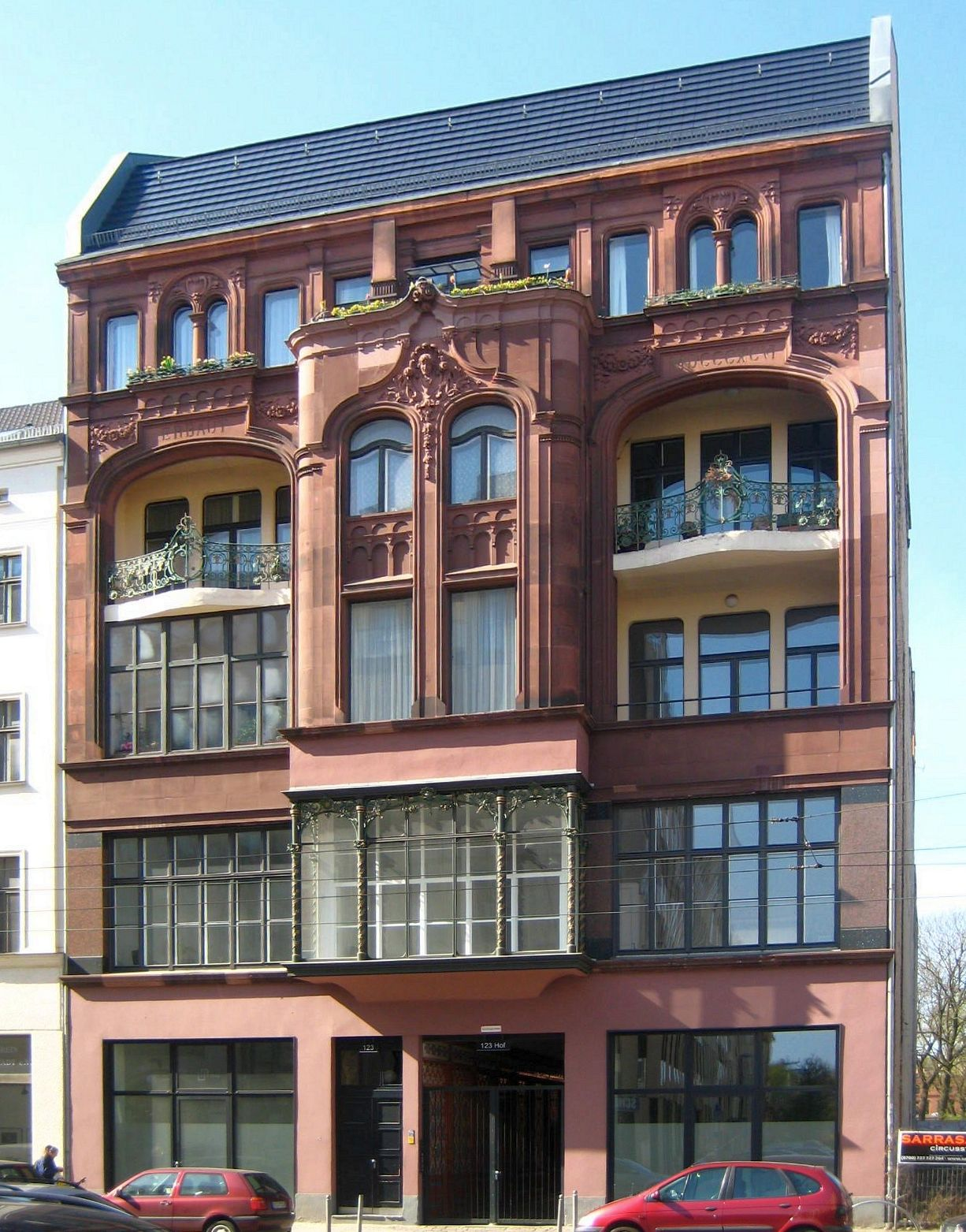
123 Chauseestraße

Bioscope built new offices in 1906 at 123 Chausseestraße, in the east of Berlin; a glasshouse studio was erected in the large courtyard at the rear of the Jugendstil building, where Continental-Kunstfilm would later film In Nacht und Eis in 1912.

=== Vitascope-Theater ===
Greenbaum began acquiring cinemas, opening a Vitascope cinema at 10 Friedrichstraße, (Note: Coincidentally, right next door to 11 Friedrichstraße, the offices of Cines-Theater AG, a Berlin-based offshoot of the Società Italiana Cines, which was involved with the building of the Ufa-Pavillon am Nollendorfplatz in 1912–1913.) and in March 1907 he registered Vitascope Theater GmbH as a limited company. Its partners were Louis Rosenfeld and Otto Heinemann.

This established a vertically integrated network with Vitascope handling the distribution for Bioscope films.

=== Sale of Deutsche Bioscope ===
As his business increased, Greenbaum made a deal with the chemist Carl Moritz Schleussner of the photochemicals firm Schleussner AG in Frankfurt/Main. Carl Schleussner had been involved since 1896 in producing negative film stock for Röntgen photography soon after its discovery. In February 1908 Carl Schleussner bought Deutsche Bioscop as a manufacturing, copying and sales operation, for a 2/3 share of 140,000 marks, with 1/3 provided by Greenbaum and his brother Max. Deutsche Bioskop was re-registered on 27 February 1908, and Schleussner bought out the Greenbaums' remaining share in 1909.

Under its new owner, Deutsche Bioskop AG moved to Babelsberg Studio in November 1911, which is well-known as the oldest large-scale film studio in the world and still today producing well-known blockbusters. Deutsche Bioskop AG later merged with Erich Pommer's Decla-Film in 1920 to create Decla-Bioskop AG.

=== Bioscope-Theater ===
Greenbaum registered a new cinema company, Bioskope-Theater GmbH, on 24 February 1908. The directors were Jules' brother, Max Greenbaum (an experienced banker), and Erich Zeiske. In October 1908, Greenbaum opened the Rollkrug Vitascope cinema, a showpiece 500-seat movie theatre equipped to show sound films on Hermannplatz, 1–2 Berliner Straße. (Note: The cinema was taken over by Decla Film in 1920. Ufa absorbed Decla-Bioscop in 1921, and completely rebuilt the cinema as a 400-seat preview studio theatre.) When Greenbaum left Deutsche Bioscop on 8 September 1909, the Bioskope-Theater became Deutsche Vitaskope Gmbh, releasing films under the 'Deutsche Vitascope' name.

== Synchroscope – early sound films ==
Greenbaum's firm invented and used Synchroscope, which synchronised the visual picture of films with phonograph records to create a working sound and vision system. Greenbaum produced a number of these sound shorts of vocal classical music, and in 1908 entered into contracts to supply the machinery to Carl Laemmle's Movie Service Company in Chicago and to another American, Charles Urban, in Britain. Carl Laemmle installed the system in a number of American cinemas, mostly in German-speaking communities. Synchroscope largely petered out because not enough sound films were made to meet demand and because it could only last for two or three reels while the standard length of films was increasingly four or five reels long. Costs had soared by the end of 1908 (the Synchroscope was originally priced at $750 (around $20,000 in 2015); and Schleussner AG bought out Greenbaum's share of Deutsche Bioscope to free up his operations.

== Deutsche Vitascope ==
On 8 September 1909 Vitascope-Theater GmbH changed its name to Deutsche Vitascope GmbH, with Greenbaum the owner and managing director, and headquarters at 20 Friedrichstraße. (Note: "Berlin. Vitascope Theater Operating Company Ltd. (Vitascope Theater Betriebsgesellschaft mit beschränkter Haftung) According to the decision of August 17, 1909, the company is changed to: Deutsche Vitascope Company Ltd. (Deutsche Vitascope Gesellschaft mit beschränkter Haftung) The object of the company is henceforth: The manufacture and sale of articles used in the cinematograph industry and related industries, as well as the operation of cinematograph theaters. According to the resolution of August 17, 1909, the share capital was increased by 3,000 marks to 24,000 marks. Ernst Mirre is no longer managing director The businessman (Kaufmann) Jules Greenbaum in Berlin has been appointed managing director.") The firm's chief objective was the production of sound pictures on continuous film so that all the reels could be shown without interruptions. The 1910 Vitascope catalogue advertised a flicker-free camera, Vitaphone soundfilms, arc lamps, used original Vitascope films and 100,000 meters of used vaudeville/variety act movies, for 20-40 pfennigs/meter.

Studios at 32–34 Lindenstraße

In 1910 Vitascope opened main offices and a film copying facility at 32–34 Lindenstraße (Berlin), with a glasshouse studio on the roof. Greenbaum moved to new recording rooms for sound production at 105 Große Frankfurter Straße, where Vitascope produced short films of about 120 feet (60m) synchronised with phonograph recordings of vocal numbers, opera arias and dance pieces. The sound films were directed by Franz Porten and starred his daughter Henny Porten. One notable film was of Mignon Act I by Ambroise Thomas with the Royal Court Orchestra & Choir and the Royal Ballet.

Greenbaum also had a 'normal' silent film studio at 94 Markgrafenstraße. Vitascope's first film of 1910 was Arsène Lupin contra Sherlock Holmes produced and directed by Viggo Larsen who joined in 1909 from Nordisk. Larsen remained with Vitascope for two years, then founded his own company with star Wanda Treumann. Walter Schmidthässler also joined in 1910, working as director and lead actor for Vitascope. In 1911 Max Mack was engaged as scriptwriter, soon debuting as actor and director, with Gehirnreflexe (Brain Reflex) and three others with Albert Bassermann, notably The Other. The Blue Mouse showed at the new Marmorhaus cinema.

Studio at 16 Friedrichstraße

Vitascope opened a further studio at Friedrichstraße 16 in 1911; and in October 1912 Greenbaum vacated 123 Chauseestraße and moved everything to 32–34 Lindenstraße (including manufacture, developing and copying equipment). The fine red sandstone building at 123 Chauseestraße was taken over by Walter Schmidthässler and his recently formed Continental-Kunstfilm.

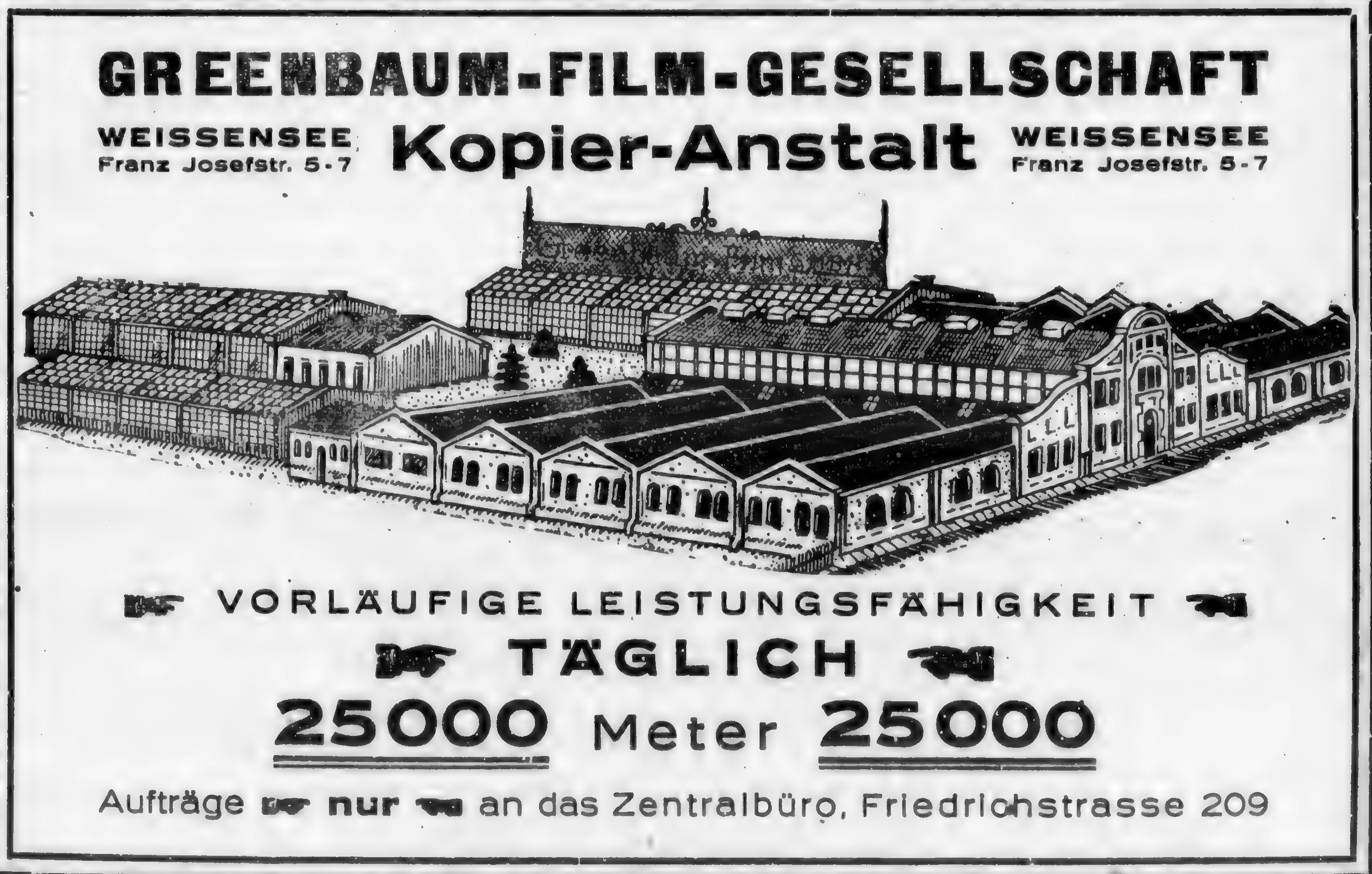
Greenbaum-Film's studios and copying facility in Weissensee, April 1918

Studios at 5–7 Franz-Josef-Straße, Weissensee

Needing to expand even further, Greenbaum acquired land at 5–7 Franz-Josef-Straße (now Max-Liebermann-Straße), Weißensee, and in 1913 built a double glasshouse studio along with the largest film processing lab in the country (capable of an advertised 100,000 meters daily capacity.) Showrooms remained in 32/34 Lindenstraße, and the entire production of films moved to Weissensee on 1 October 1913, along with the manufacturing, drying and copying equipment. (Note: The studios at 32/34 Lindenstraße were occupied in 1928–1932 by a less successful sound film company, de:Lignose Hörfilm System Breusing GmbH. The parent company, Lignose AG, processed nitrates, producing raw celluloid film, along with guncotton and other explosives, and pocket pistols. Along with a film production company, Phoebus AG, Lignose was indirectly involved in a hushed-up scandal which had threatened to expose wide-spread circumvention of the terms of the Versailles Treaty by Germany after World War I. The "Lohmann Affair" was named after the Naval Captain (German: Kapitan zur See) who oversaw millions of marks' worth of clandestine funding for secret Naval projects during the Weimar Republic.)

== Merger with PAGU ==
In January 1914 Greenbaum merged his Vitascope firm with PAGU (Projektions-Aktiengesellschaft 'Union'), owned by his rival Paul Davidson, in order to compete with the larger French studios who were flooding the German market with their films.

The brief merger between PAGU and Vitascope (1914–15) was called Union-Vitascope Gmbh. (Note: They made eg Der Hund von Baskerville (recently re-discovered), the first of 7 films 1914-1920 with parts I-IV made by Greenbaum at 5-7 Franz-Joseph Strasse in the Weissensee Studios, and parts V (1915), VI & VII (1920) by Davidson/PAGU probably after the split. See de:Der Hund von Baskerville (1914). See also "The Hound of the Baskervilles". The EOFFTV review.)

PAGU combined the resources of 800 employees, with main offices in Zimmerstraße and Lindenstraße, 20 "Union" cinemas, glasshouse studios in Tempelhof and in Weissensee, with its duplicating lab. Both companies continued to produce films under their own name and logos. From January 1914 Richard Oswald was artistic and advertising director at Vitascope. Oswald made the "Baskerville" detective series.

Pathé

Still seeking further distribution outlets, Greenbaum and Davidson closed a deal with Pathé Frères to distribute PAGU films. Pathé bought the Weissensee studios at 5–7 Franz-Josef-Straße in July 1914. However, with the outbreak of the First World War, foreign films were barred from Germany allowing domestic production to boom. Pathé and PAGU broke off relationships; the admin offices and studios belonging to Pathé were placed into receivership, and reverted to Greenbaum.

== Greenbaum-Film ==
Weissensee

The war resulted in the elimination of foreign competition. He broke with Davidson's PAGU and founded Greenbaum-Film out of Vitascope. On 12 January 1915 Greenbaum-Film was incorporated with 10,000 marks and started production again in 5–7 Franz-Josef-Straße, Weissensee, with office and sales at Friedrichstraße 235. An article in Lichtbild-Bühne for 3 June 1915 announced: "Dr. Hans Oberländer, Richard Löwenbein, Richard Oswald, Greenbaum-Film GmbH – the biggest film factory in Germany." Oswald made five films in a few months and then separated financially from Greenbaum-Film, becoming a self-employed producer and director.

In 1916 Greenbaum closed a deal with Albert Bassermann, who starred in seventeen films for Greenbaum-Film by 1920. Director Adolf Gärtner (who worked on Joe May's Stuart Webbs detective series) also moved to Greenbaum-Film and directed nine films in Weißensee. Greenbaum took out a 5-year lease on the Weißensee premises from 4 January 1917 – 1922. In 1919 he leased the double glasshouse studios to Joe May for 600,000 marks, which became known as the May-Atelier.

== Merger with Ufa – bankruptcy and death ==
In 1919 Greenbaum affiliated with Ufa, which the State had quietly established as the giant of German film industry during the war, but the deal led to a series of legal disputes and the virtual bankruptcy of Greenbaum-Film.

Greenbaum negotiated a monopoly contract with Ufa to supply films to Ukraine, Bulgaria, Romania and Turkey. Although Ufa generally didn't break even with domestic sales in Germany alone, foreign sales could make up the difference. However, the war had enormous repercussions for the Balkan peninsula with the borders of many states completely redrawn after 1919. This unsettled political situation led to reduced profits; Ufa claimed millions from Greenbaum for lost sales and the dispute escalated through the courts. Ufa's interests were represented by Hemann Fellner, Greenbaum's former business partner.

In April 1920, rival company Decla Film merged with Deutsche Bioscop GmbH and became known as Decla-Bioscop.

Greenbaum lost the factory and everything else, and died in 1924 in a mental hospital aged 57. The studios were taken over by Ufa after his death; his two sons George and Mutz managed Greenbaum-Film until it was taken over by Hermann Millakowsky and eventually liquidated in 1932.

During his life Greenbaum launched the career of a number of leading German directors and actors including Max Mack, Richard Oswald and Maria Orska. His son Mutz Greenbaum ("Max Greene") became a leading cinematographer, whose films include Christopher Columbus (1923) starring Albert Bassermann, Thunder Rock (1942) and I'm All Right Jack (1959).

== Selected filmography ==
- The Other (1913)
- The Blue Mouse (1913)
- Where Is Coletti? (1913)
- Detektiv Braun (1914)
- Ivan Koschula (1914)
- The Iron Cross (1914)
- Laugh Bajazzo (1915)
- The Vice (1915)
- Dämon und Mensch (1915, producer)
- The Confessions of the Green Mask (1916)
- The Night Talk (1917)
- Lorenzo Burghardt (1918)
- Father and Son (1918)
- The Zaarden Brothers (1918)
- Doctor Schotte (1918)
- The Voice (1920)
- The Sons of Count Dossy (1920)
- Dolls of Death (1920)
- The Last Witness (1921)
- The Oath of Stephan Huller (1921)
- The Nights of Cornelis Brouwer (1921)
