= Gertrud Kanitz =

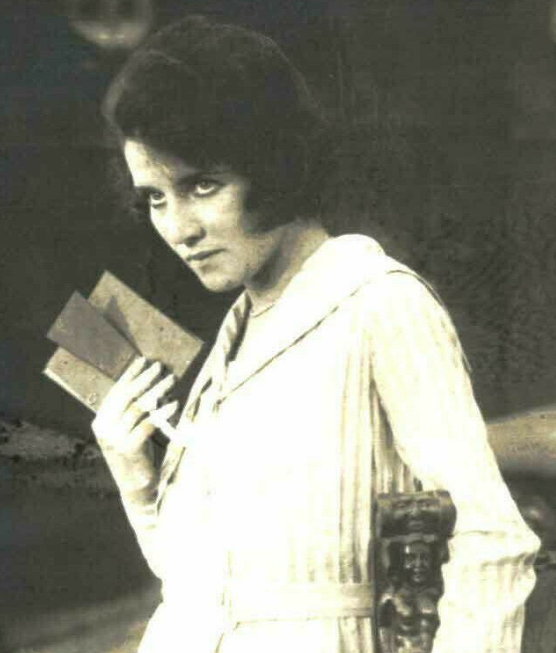
- Kanitz c. 1918
- Born: Vienna, Austria
- Died: January 15, 1943
- Occupation: Actress
- Years active: 1918-1931

Gertrud Reif Kanitz (died January 15, 1943) was an Austrian actress in German language films and theatre in the 1910s and 1920s. Her family fled from their home country to the United States in 1938 when the Anschluss began.

== Career ==
Raised in Vienna, Austria, Kanitz attended Max Reinhardt's acting school and debuted on the stage as Snow White in fairy tale plays during the winter of 1916 in Hamburg. She later lived with her husband and children in a rural area of Austria where she taught a school classroom for students from varying countries. Her husband later established the Vienna Choir, which resulted in them traveling between their town and Vienna. In March of 1938, while they were back in their rural village, the family was informed about the Anschluss occurring in Vienna. They fled to America in June 1938.

== Filmography ==
- Shadows of the Night (German: Schatten der Nacht) (1918)
- Father and Son (German: Vater und Sohn) (1918)
- The Laughing Death (German: Der lachende Tod) (1918)
- The Wandering Eye (German: Das wandernde Auge) (1919)
- The Duke of Reichstadt (German: Der Herzog von Reichstadt) (1931)

== Theatre ==
- Die selige Excellenz (1921) as Helga
- Satyros (1922) as Psyche
- Miß Sara Sampson (1922) as Gretchen
- Zärtlichen Verwandten (1924)
- König Hunger (1924) as the girl in black
- Narrenliebe (1926)

== Personal life ==
Kanitz was married to music professor, Dr. Ernest Kanitz. He taught at Winthrop College and then Erskine College. She died in New York on January 15, 1943 due to an illness. Their home was in South Carolina. They had a son and two daughters. After her death he moved to Los Angeles. The University of Southern California has a collection of his papers.
