= Elsa Bassermann =

German actress

- Born: Elsa Sarah Schiff; 14 January 1878; Leipzig, German Empire
- Died: 30 May 1961 (aged 83); Baden-Baden, West Germany
- Occupations: Screenwriter, film actress
- Years active: 1913–1945
- Spouse: Albert Bassermann (m. 1908; died 1952)

Elsa Bassermann (born Elsa Sarah Schiff; January 14, 1878 – May 30, 1961) was a German screenwriter and stage and film actress. She was married to Albert Bassermann and often acted with him. As she was Jewish, the couple had to leave Nazi Germany and go into exile in Switzerland and the United States. She later returned to Germany, where she died in 1961.

== Partial filmography ==
- Gerda Gerovius (1913)
- Der letzte Tag (1913)
- Urteil des Arztes (1914)
- Du sollst keine anderen Götter haben (1917)
- Der eiserne Wille (1917)
- Herr und Diener (1917)
- Father and Son (1918)
- The Zaarden Brothers (1918)
- Doctor Schotte (1918)
- Lorenzo Burghardt (1918)
- Das Werk seines Lebens (1919) - Friedel
- Eine schwache Stunde (1919)
- Die Duplizität der Ereignisse (1920)
- The Voice (1920)
- The Sons of Count Dossy (1920) - Gräfin
- Masks (1920)
- Dolls of Death (1920) - Konstanze
- Der Frauenarzt (1921) - Frau Dr. Holländer
- The Last Witness (1921)
- Lucrezia Borgia (1922)
- Christopher Columbus (1923) - Ehefrau des Columbus
- Alraune (1930) - A lady
- Dreyfus (1930) - Parisian lady
- A Woman Branded (1931) - Frau Thorn, Ilses Mutter
- Cadets (1931) - Gräfin Kleist
- Last Love (1935) - Hanna von Hooven
- Escape (1940) - Mrs. Henning
- New Wine (1941) - Minor Role (uncredited)
- Desperate Journey (1942) - Frau Raeder
- Madame Curie (1943) - Madame Perot
- The Captain from Köpenick (completed in 1941, released in 1945) (aka I Was a Criminal) - Mrs. Marie Hoprecht
- Rhapsody in Blue (1945) - Guest (uncredited) (final film role)

== Bibliography ==
- Bauland, Peter (1968). The Hooded Eagle: Modern German Drama on the New York Stage. Syracuse, NY: Syracuse University Press. LCCN 67-31564.
