= Napoleon and the Little Washerwoman =

1920 film directed by Adolf Gärtner

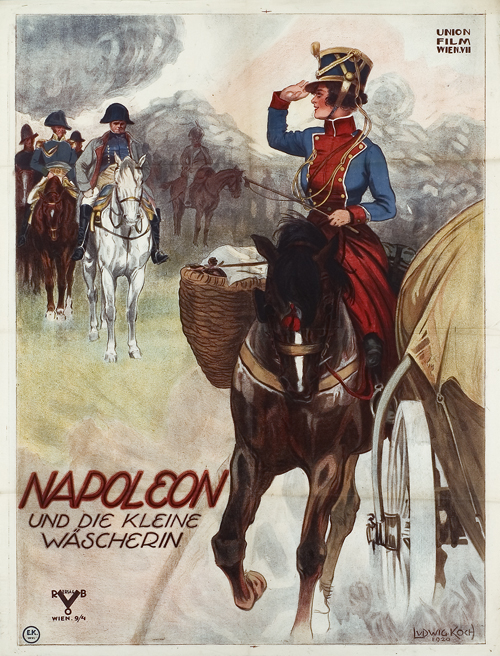
- Austrian theatrical release poster
- Directed by: Adolf Gärtner
- Written by: Victorien Sardou (play); Willi Wolff; Martin Zickel
- Produced by: Willi Wolff
- Starring: Ellen Richter; Rudolf Lettinger; Georg John
- Cinematography: Arpad Viragh
- Production company: Ellen Richter Film
- Distributed by: UFA
- Release date: 1 December 1920
- Country: Germany
- Languages: Silent; German intertitles

Napoleon and the Little Washerwoman (German: Napoleon und die kleine Wäscherin) is a 1920 German silent historical comedy film directed by Adolf Gärtner and starring Ellen Richter, Rudolf Lettinger and Georg John. It is based on the 1893 play Madame Sans-Gêne by Victorien Sardou.

The film's sets were designed by the art director Hans Dreier.

== Cast ==
- Ellen Richter as Madame Sans-Gêne
- Rudolf Lettinger as Napoleon Bonaparte
- Georg John
- Friedrich Wilhelm Kaiser
- Ludwig Körner
- Hans Lindegg
- Henri Peters-Arnolds

== Bibliography ==
- Holger Bachmann. Arthur Schnitzler und Michael Curtiz: Der junge Medardus auf der Bühne und im Kino. Verlag Die Blaue Eule, 2003.
