= Adolf Gärtner =

German film director

- Born: 24 July 1867; Berlin, German Empire
- Died: 9 February 1937 (aged 69); Berlin
- Occupation: Director
- Years active: 1910–1925

Adolf Gärtner (24 July 1867 − 9 February 1937) was a German film director of the silent era.

== Selected filmography ==
- The Night Talk (1917)
- Sadja (1918)
- The Lady in the Car (1919)
- Between Two Worlds (1919)
- Napoleon and the Little Washerwoman (1920)
- Mary Tudor (1920)
- Princess Woronzoff (1920)
- The Sons of Count Dossy (1920)
- The Voice (1920)
- The Devil and Circe (1921)
- The Last Witness (1921)
- The Adventuress of Monte Carlo (1921)
- The White Death (1921)
- The Riddle of the Sphinx (1921)
- The Circus Princess (1925)

== Bibliography ==
- Tim Cresswell & Deborah Dixon. Engaging Film: Geographies of Mobility and Identity. Rowman & Littlefield Publishers, 2002.
