= Albert Bassermann =

German actor

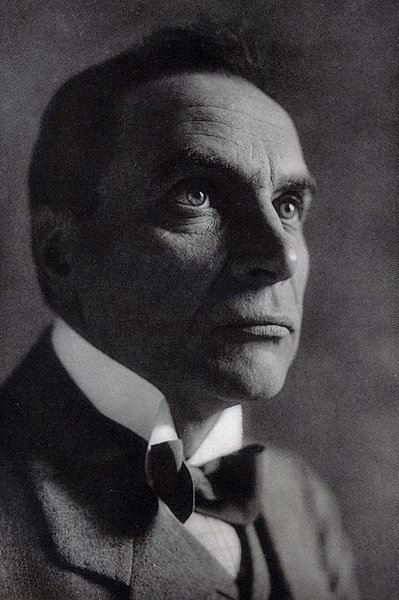
- Bassermann in 1918
- Born: 7 September 1867; Mannheim, Grand Duchy of Baden
- Died: 15 May 1952 (aged 84) en route to Zürich, Switzerland
- Occupations: Screen, stage actor
- Years active: 1887–1948
- Spouse: Elsa Schiff (m. 1908)

Albert Bassermann (7 September 1867 – 15 May 1952) was a German stage and screen actor. He was considered to be one of the greatest German-speaking actors of his generation and received the famous Iffland-Ring. Bassermann was nominated for the Academy Award for Best Supporting Actor for his performance in Foreign Correspondent (1940). He was married to Elsa Schiff with whom he frequently performed.

== Life and career ==
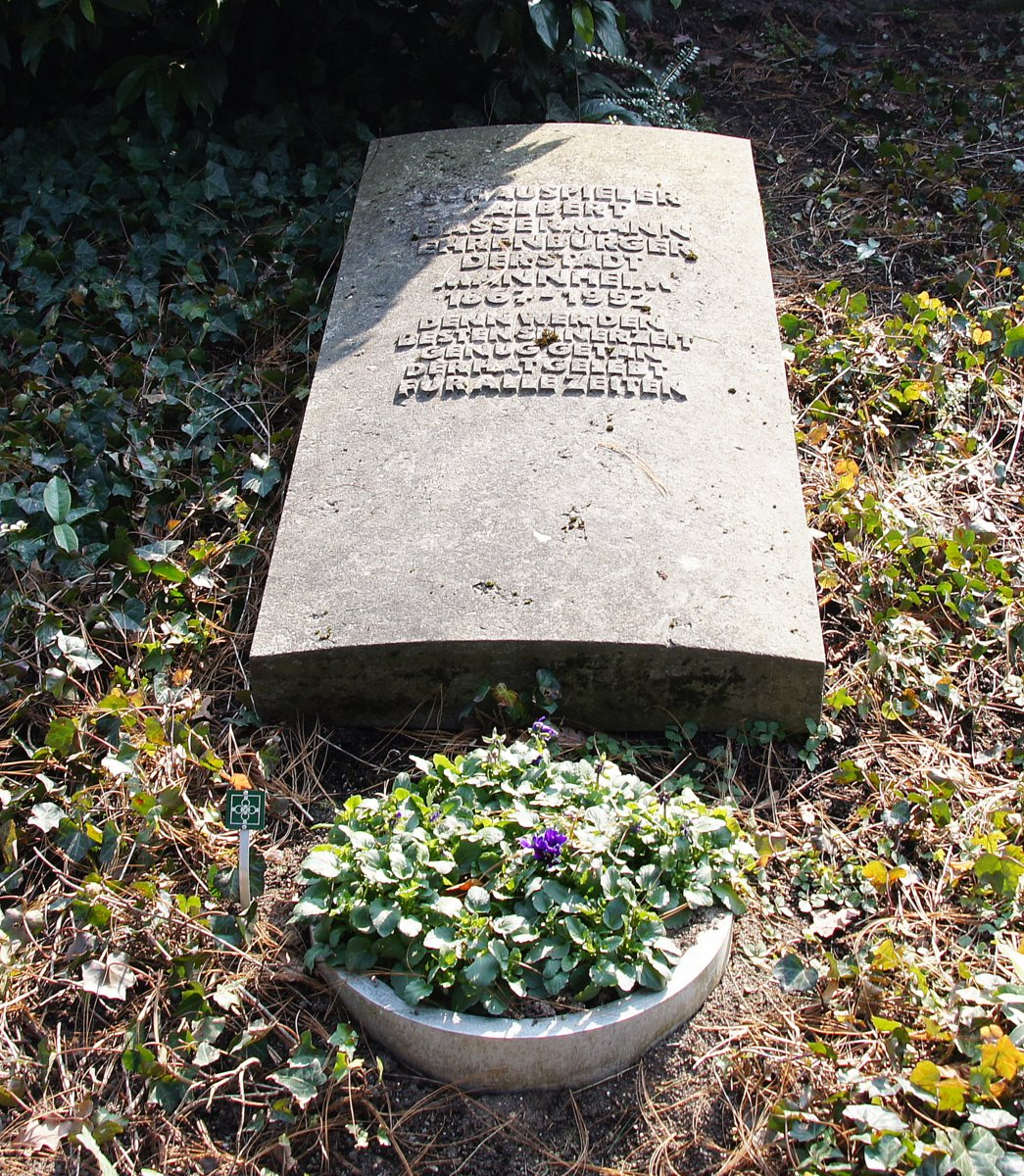
His grave in Mannheim

Bassermann began his acting career in 1887 in Mannheim, his birthplace, after he began to study chemistry at the Technical University of Karlsruhe in 1884/85. He was an actor at the Meiningen Court Theatre for 4 years. He then moved to Berlin. From 1899, he worked for Otto Brahm. He began work at the Deutsches Theater Berlin from 1904, the same year that his future wife, actress Elsa Schiff, moved to Berlin to work at that same theater. In 1909, the year after they married, he started working at the Lessing Theatre, though he also continued at the Deutsches Theater, working there with Max Reinhardt from 1909 to 1915. Roles included Othello in 1910, Faust Part II with Friedrich Kayssler in 1911, Shylock in The Merchant of Venice and August Strindberg's The Storm with Gertrud Eysoldt in 1913.

Bassermann was among the first German theatre actors who worked in film. In 1913, he played the main role of the lawyer in Max Mack's Der Andere (The Other), after the play by Paul Lindau. In 1915, he appeared in Egmont (play) with de:Victor Barnowsky at the de:Deutsches Künstlertheater. He also worked with German silent film directors Richard Oswald, Ernst Lubitsch, Leopold Jessner and Lupu Pick. In 1928 he appeared in the first staging of Carl Zuckmayer's Katharina Knie, and in November that year in Herr Lambertier by Verneuil In 1933, Bassermann left Germany and lived in Switzerland, then moved to the United States in 1938.

Annija Simsone, who played opposite Bassermann in the Neue Wiener Buehne Theater in the 1920s, wrote the following in her autobiography: "During the Hitler era, Bassermann did not perform in Germany, though Adolf Hitler personally held him in high regard; Elsa was Jewish. Bassermann was told that if he wanted to continue to perform in Germany, he would have to get divorced. He did not get divorced, but Elsa and he went to Switzerland instead."

Although his ability to speak English was very limited, he learned lines phonetically with assistance from his wife and found work as a character actor. For his performance as the Dutch statesman Van Meer in Alfred Hitchcock's Foreign Correspondent, Bassermann was nominated for an Academy Award as Best Supporting Actor in 1940. He returned to Europe in 1946. His final film appearance was in The Red Shoes.

In her acting textbook Respect for Acting, actress Uta Hagen said: "One of the finest lessons I ever learned was from the great German actor Albert Basserman. I worked with him as Hilde in The Master Builder by Ibsen. He was already past eighty but was as 'modern' in his conception of the role of Solness and in his techniques as anyone I've ever seen or played with. In rehearsals he felt his way with the new cast. (The role had been in his repertoire for almost forty years.) He watched us, listened to us, adjusted to us, meanwhile executing his actions with only a small part of his playing energy. At the first dress rehearsal, he started to play fully. There was such a vibrant reality to the rhythm of his speech and behavior that I was swept away by it. I kept waiting for him to come to an end with his intentions so that I could take my 'turn.' As a result, I either made a big hole in the dialogue or desperately cut in on him in order to avoid another hole. I was expecting the usual 'It's your turn; then it's my turn.' At the end of the first act I went to his dressing room and said, 'Mr. Basserman, I can't apologize enough, but I never know when you're through!' He looked at me in amazement and said, 'I'm never through! And neither should you be.'"

== Death ==
Bassermann died on 15 May 1952, at or near Zurich Airport, soon after his flight from the United States had arrived. He is buried in Mannheim.

== Filmography ==
Year	Title	Role	Notes
1913	Der Andere	Dr. Hallers	The Other
1913	Der König	Provinzschauspieler	
1913	Der letzte Tag	Professor Osterode	
1914	Urteil des Arztes	Dr. Erwin Hofmüller	
1917	Du sollst keine anderen Götter haben		
1917	Der eiserne Wille	Hausierer David	
1917	Herr und Diener		
1918	Father and Son		
1918	The Zaarden Brothers		
1918	Doctor Schotte		
1918	Lorenzo Burghardt		
1919	Eine schwache Stunde		
1919	Das Werk seines Lebens	Peter	
1920	Die Duplizität der Ereignisse		
1920	The Voice		
1920	The Sons of Count Dossy	The Count/The Thief's Son	
1920	Masks		
1920	Dolls of Death		
1921	Der Frauenarzt	Dr. Wolfgang Holländer	
1921	The Nights of Cornelis Brouwer	Cornelis Brouwer	
1921	Burning Country		
1921	The Last Witness	Olaf Baggerson	
1921	Die kleine Dagmar		
1922	Frauenopfer	Graf	Women's Sacrifice
1922	The Loves of Pharaoh	Sothis	
1922	Lucrezia Borgia	Pope Alexander VI	
1923	The Man in the Iron Mask	Cardinal Mazarin	The Man with the Iron Mask
1923	Earth Spirit	Dr. Schoen	
1923	Christopher Columbus	Columbus	
1923	Old Heidelberg		The Student Prince
1923	Abenteuer einer Nacht		
1924	Helena	Aisakos	Helen of Troy
1925	Letters Which Never Reached Him	Konsul Werner Gerling	
1925	The Director General	Generaldirektor Herbert Heidenberg	
1926	Professor Imhof		
1929	Fräulein Else	Dr. Alfred Thalhof	
1929	Napoleon at Saint Helena	Governor Hudson Lowe	
1930	Alraune	Privy Councillor ten Brinken	Daughter of Evil
1930	Dreyfus	Col. Picquart	The Dreyfus Case
1931	1914	Count Bethmann Hollweg	
1931	A Woman Branded	Dr. Ringius	
1931	Inquest	Dr. Konrad Bienert	
1931	Cadets	General von Seddin	Cadets
1932	The Golden Anchor	Piquoiseau	
1933	Ein gewisser Herr Gran	Tschernikoff, Kunsthändler	
1935	Last Love	Thomas Bruck	
1938	Heroes of the Marne	Col. von Gelow	
1940	Dr. Ehrlich's Magic Bullet	Dr. Robert Koch	
1940	Foreign Correspondent	Van Meer	Nominated: Academy Award for Best Supporting Actor
1940	Knute Rockne, All American	Father Julius Nieuwland	
1940	A Dispatch from Reuters	Franz Geller	
1940	Escape	Dr. Arthur Henning	
1940	Moon Over Burma	Basil Renner	
1941	A Woman's Face	Consul Magnus Barring	
1941	The Great Awakening	Ludwig van Beethoven	
1941	The Shanghai Gesture	Van Elst, The Commissioner	
1942	Fly-by-Night	Dr. Storm	
1942	Invisible Agent	Arnold Schmidt	
1942	Desperate Journey	Dr. Ludwig Mather	
1942	The Moon and Sixpence	Dr. Coutras	
1942	Once Upon a Honeymoon	Gen. Borelski	
1942	Reunion in France	General Hugo Schroeder	
1943	Good Luck, Mr. Yates	Dr. Carl Hesser	
1943	Madame Curie	Prof. Jean Perot	
1944	Since You Went Away	Dr. Sigmund Gottlieb Golden	
1945	The Captain from Köpenick	Wilhelm Voigt, a shoemaker	I Was a Criminal
1945	Strange Holiday	School Principal	The Day After Tomorrow; uncredited
1945	Rhapsody in Blue	Prof. Franck	
1946	The Searching Wind	Count von Stammer	
1947	The Private Affairs of Bel Ami	Jacques Rival	
1947	Escape Me Never	Prof. Heinrich	
1948	The Red Shoes	Sergei Ratov	Final film role

== See also ==
- List of German-speaking Academy Award winners and nominees

== Sources ==
- Styan, J. L. (1982). Max Reinhardt. Cambridge: CUP Archive. ISBN 9780521295048.
