= William Wauer =

German sculptor and film director

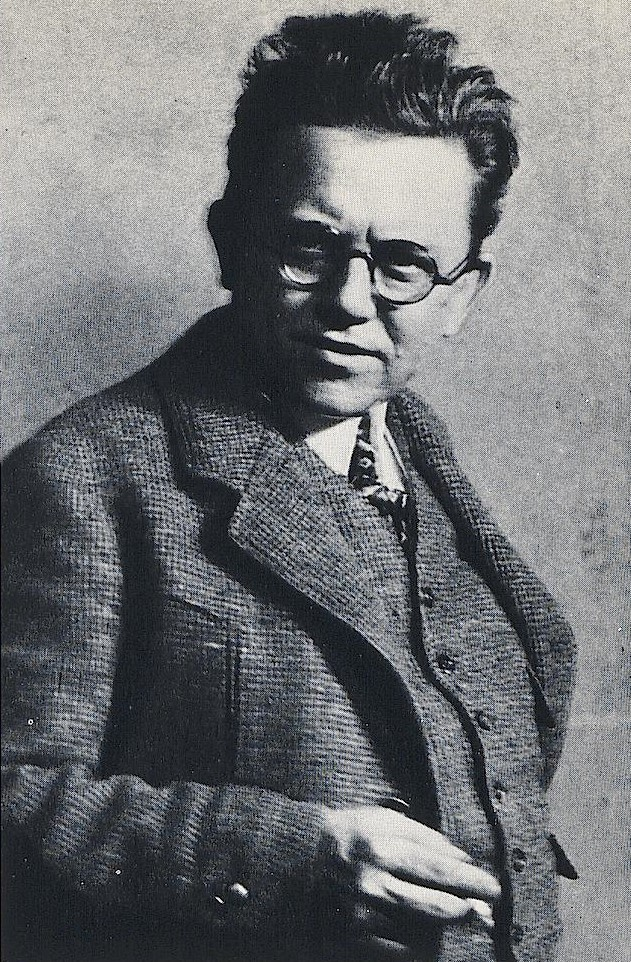
- Born: 26 October 1866; Oberwiesenthal, Saxony (Germany)
- Died: 10 March 1962 (aged 95); West Berlin, West Germany
- Years active: 1913–1921 (film)

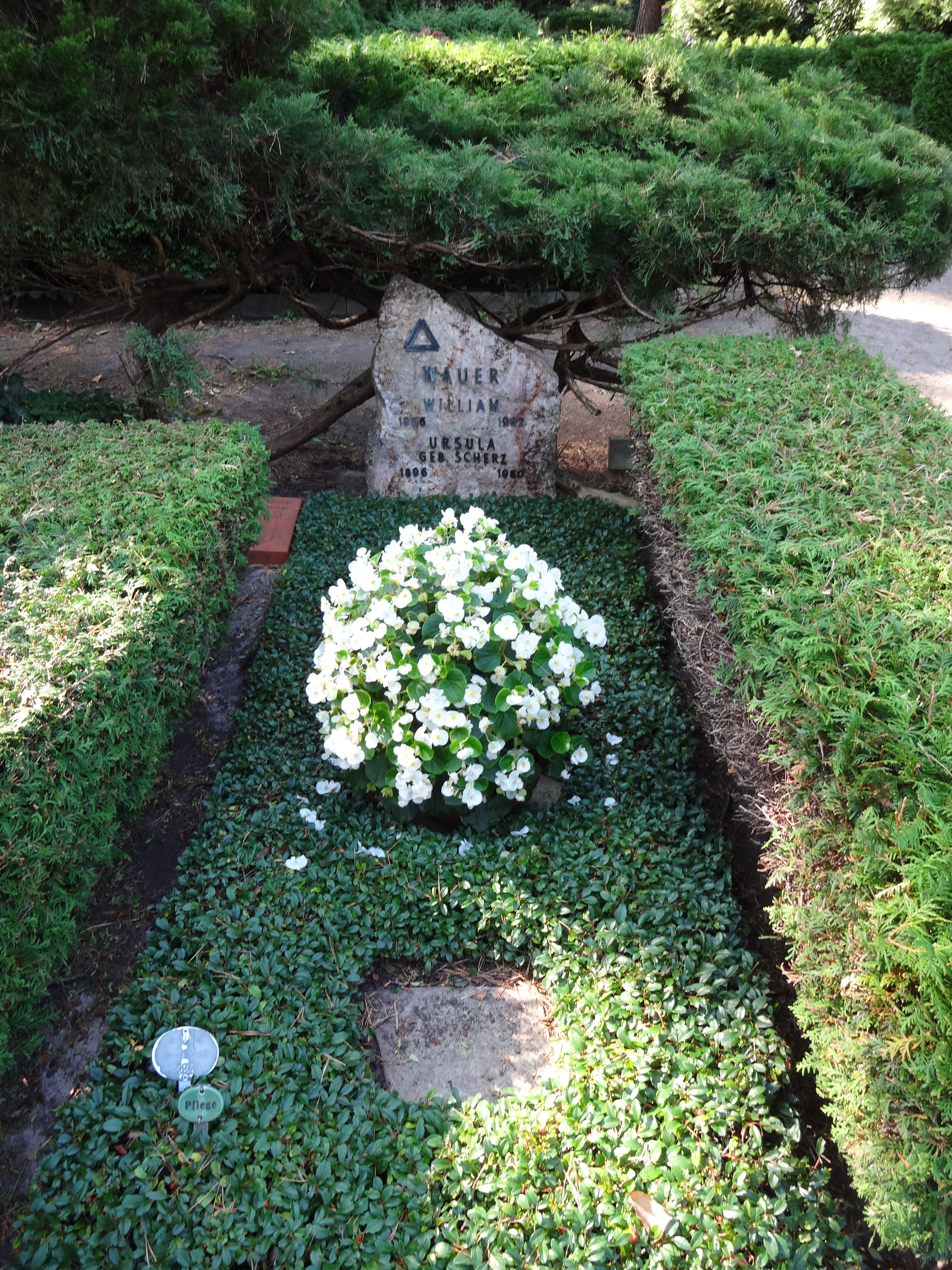
Grave of William Wauer in the Waldfriedhof in Dahlem

William Wauer (1866–1962) was a German sculptor and film director of the silent era. In 1913 he co-directed the biopic Richard Wagner (1913). In 1915 he directed The Tunnel the first adaptation of Bernhard Kellermann's science fiction novel Der Tunnel.

His birthplace is now the Wauer Museum.

== Life ==
He was born in Oberwiesenthal on 26 October 1866 the son of a Lutheran minister, Canon Johann Carl Ernst Wauer and his wife Katharine Knobloch. He went to school in Dresden and Halle then attended the Academy of Art first in Dresden then in Berlin and Munich. He then travelled to America where he studied in San Francisco and New York for two years. He then returned to Germany to study Philosophy and Art History at the University of Leipzig.

From 1888 he worked as an art critic for the magazine "XX Jahrhundert" (20th Century). When radio came to Germany he began working in this field and began film-making in 1911. His work was part of the sculpture event in the art competition at the 1928 Summer Olympics.

The Nazis declared both his film and his sculpture as "degenerate art" putting an immediate end to both activities. Although he was allowed to continue these pursuits from 1945, the post-war spirit and economy did not embrace this, and the long break and huge changes in the new post-war world meant he did not resume his art to any meaningful degree. He did one portrait in this later period, an oil painting of Karl Hofer in 1947.

In 1949 he saw the creation of West Berlin as a western enclave within an otherwise communist regime, and in 1961 he was one of the many Berliners encircled by the Berlin Wall.

He died in West Berlin on 10 March 1962 and is buried in the Forest Cemetery in the Dahlem district. The grave is identified as a "grave of honour of the City of Berlin" exempting it from the German practice of erasing graves if relatives fail to maintain payments for upkeep.

== Selected filmography ==
- Richard Wagner (1913) with Giuseppe Becce in title role
- Bismarck (1914)
- The Tunnel (1915)
- Peter Lump (1916)
- Doctor Schotte (1918)
- The Zaarden Brothers (1918)
- Father and Son (1918)
- The Merry Wives of Windsor (1918)
- Masks (1920)
- The Nights of Cornelis Brouwer (1921)

== Public Sculpture ==
Wauer's sculpture is extremely bold and highly distinctive.

- The Skater (1916)
- Herwarth Walden (1917) Albertinum, Dresden
- Nell Walden (1918) Herwarth's wife
- Rudolf Blümner (1918)
- The Fall (1921)
- The Dancer (1923) 7 casts

== Bibliography ==
- Abel, Richard (2005). Encyclopedia of Early Cinema. Taylor & Francis.
