= Victor Colani =

German actor

Victor Max Colani (30 October 1895 – 25 November 1957) was a German actor.

He was born in Zittau and died in The Hague, Netherlands.

== Selected filmography ==
- Der vergiftete Strom (1921)
- Lightning Command (1921)
- The Poisoned Stream (1921)
- Fratricide (1922)
- The Man in the Background (1922)
- Old Heidelberg (film, 1923)
  Old Heidelberg (1923)
- Lightning (1925)
- Reveille: The Great Awakening (1925)
- Princess Trulala (1926)
- Ehekonflikte (1927)
- Give Me Life (1928)
- Single Mother (1928)
- They May Not Marry (1929)
- Attorney for the Heart (1927)
- Revenge for Eddy (1929)

== Bibliography ==
- Weinberg, Herman G. The Lubitsch Louch: A Critical Study. Dover Publications, 1977.
