= The Big Boss (1921 film) =

1921 film

- Directed by: Max Obal
- Written by: Ernst Reicher; Alfred Schirokauer
- Produced by: Ernst Reicher
- Starring: Ernst Reicher
- Cinematography: Max Fassbender
- Production company: Stuart Webbs-Film
- Release date: 6 May 1921
- Country: Germany
- Languages: Silent; German intertitles

The Big Boss (German: Der große Chef) is a 1921 German silent crime film directed by Max Obal and starring Ernst Reicher as the detective Stuart Webbs.

== Cast ==
In alphabetical order

- Walter Dysing as Dolan
- Otto Framer as Bailey
- Alexander Granach as Der große Chef
- Ferdinand Martini as Stephan
- Hermann Nesselträger as Gefängnisdirektor
- Martha Maria Newes as Caroline Murran
- Ernst Reicher as Stuart Webbs

== Bibliography ==
- Rainey, Buck (2015). Serials and Series: A World Filmography, 1912–1956. Jefferson, NC: McFarland. ISBN 978-1-4766-0448-0.
