= George Bully =

1920 film

- Directed by: Max Obal
- Written by: Ernst Reicher; Alfred Schirokauer
- Produced by: Ernst Reicher
- Starring: Ernst Reicher
- Cinematography: Max Fassbender
- Production company: Stuart Webbs-Film
- Release date: 22 November 1920
- Country: Germany
- Languages: Silent; German intertitles

George Bully is a 1920 German silent mystery film directed by Max Obal and starring Ernst Reicher as the detective Stuart Webbs, who was modeled on Sherlock Holmes.

== Cast ==
- Ernst Reicher as Stuart Webbs, detective
- Ludwig Götz
- Stella Harf
- Erwin Kalser
- Arnold Marlé
- Ferdinand Martini
- Hermann Nesselträger
- Theo Albert Wagner as George Bully

== Bibliography ==
- Rainey, Buck. Serials and Series: A World Filmography, 1912-1956. McFarland, 2015.
