= Weissensee Studios =

Film studios in Berlin

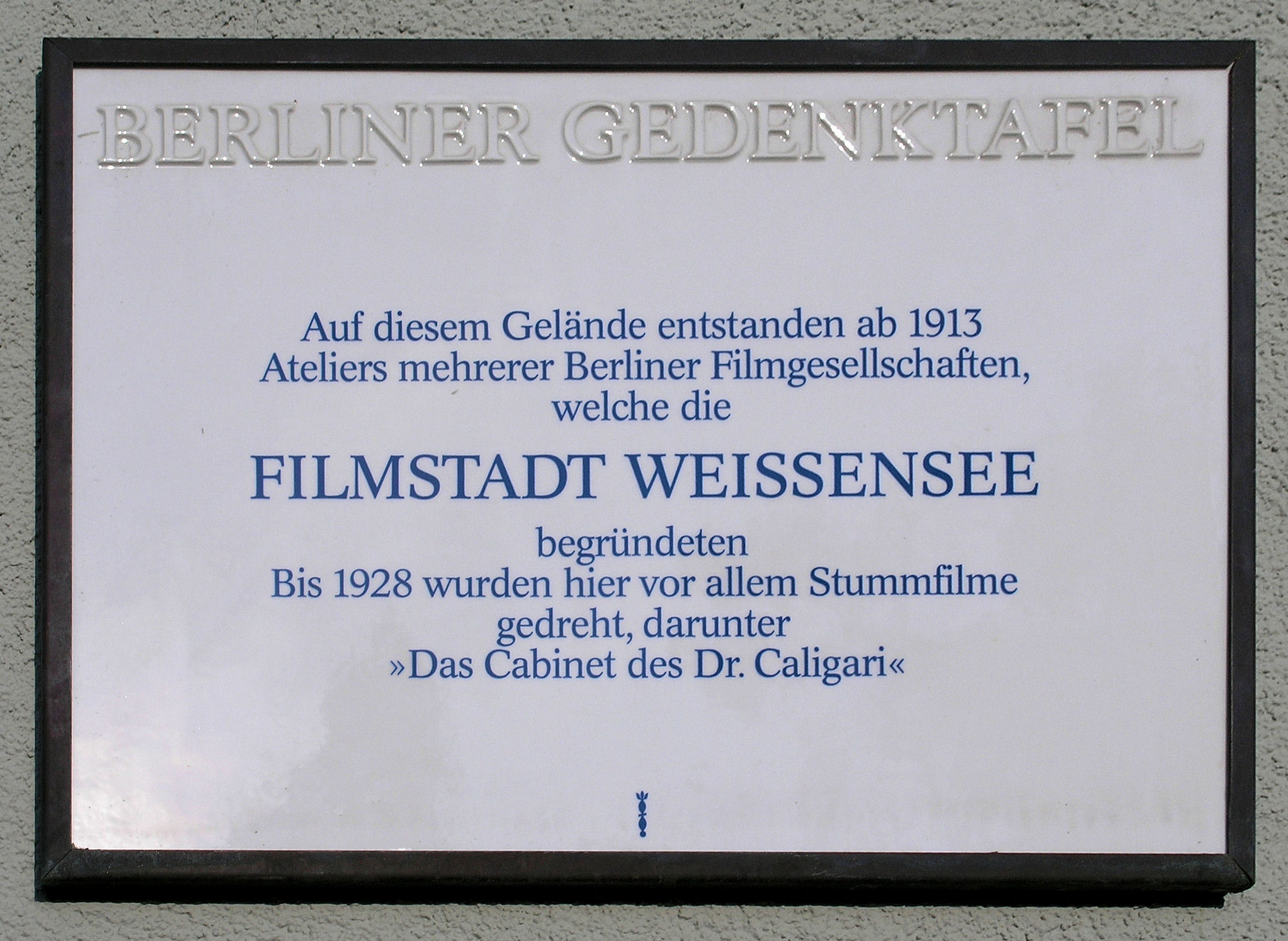
A plaque commemorating the studios

The Weissensee Studios (German: Filmstadt Weißensee) was a collection of separate film production studios located in the Berlin suburb of Weißensee during the silent era.

== History ==
The two main studios comprising the complex were almost next-door neighbours, and this has given rise to confusion as to the identity of the film companies involved and which premises they leased or owned. The studio buildings discussed in this article retained completely separate identities throughout their existence although they were occupied by several different film production companies. No films were ever made or released by "The Weissensee Studios" or "Filmstadt Weißensee", and there was never at any time any sort of joint or corporate entity with such a name.

The two main locations were:

- 5-7 Franz Josef-Straße. Some buildings still extant (2017). Associated companies and directors:
  - Deutsche Vitascope, Greenbaum-Film (Jules Greenbaum);
  - PAGU (Paul Davidson);
  - Fema-Film Atelier GmbH, May-Film AG (Joe May);
  - Ufa.
- 9-12 Franz Josef-Straße. Demolished c1928, replaced with residential apartments. Associated companies and directors:
  - Continental-Kunstfilm; Ernst Reicher; Film-Atelier GmbH (FAG); Lixie-Film;
  - Decla-Film (Erich Pommer, Otto Rippert, Fritz Lang, Robert Wiene);
  - Decla-Bioscop.

=== 5-7 Franz Josef-Straße ===
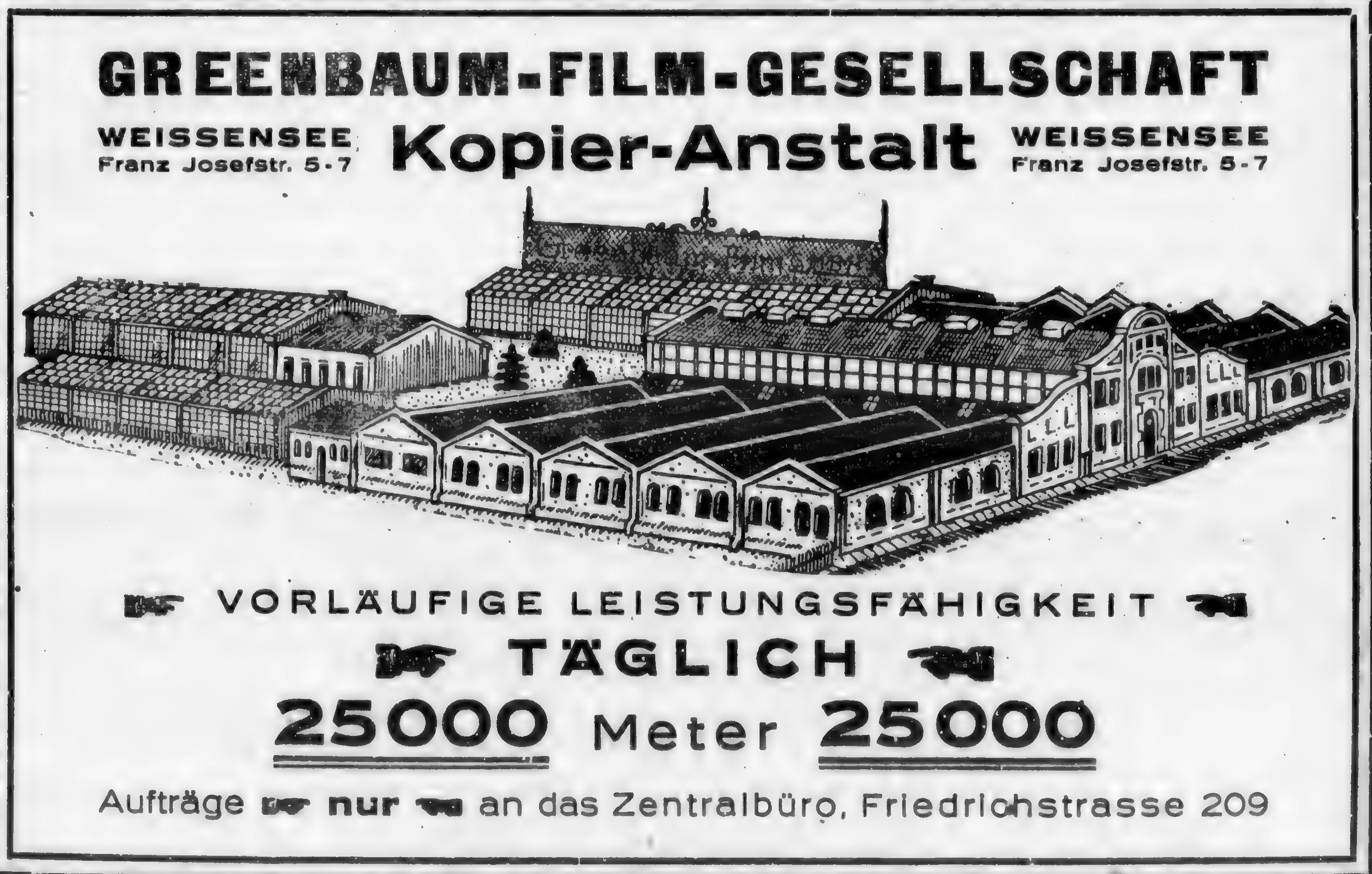
Greenbaum-Film's studios and copying facility in Weissensee, April 1918

The first studio to be built in the area, at 5-7 Franz Josef-Straße (now Liebermannstraße) in Weißensee, was opened on 1 October 1913 by Deutsche Vitascope, owned by Jules Greenbaum. Vitascope had previously occupied premises at 94 Markgrafenstrasse (Mutoskop-Atelier) and at 32-34 Lindenstrasse (Vitascope-Atelier), but had outgrown them as the business expanded. The new facility consisted of a double-size glasshouse studio covering around 300 m^{2}, and a separate film processing laboratory, billed as the biggest in Germany and capable of processing 100,000 meters of film daily.

In January 1914 Vitascope merged with PAGU (Projektions-AG 'Union'), owned by former rival Paul Davidson. The company was called Union-Vitascope Gmbh. Both companies continued to produce films under their own name and logos. From January 1914 Richard Oswald was appointed artistic and advertising director at Vitascope. He wrote the script for Der Hund von Baskerville (released June 1914), the first film adaptation of Conan Doyle's 1902 novel.

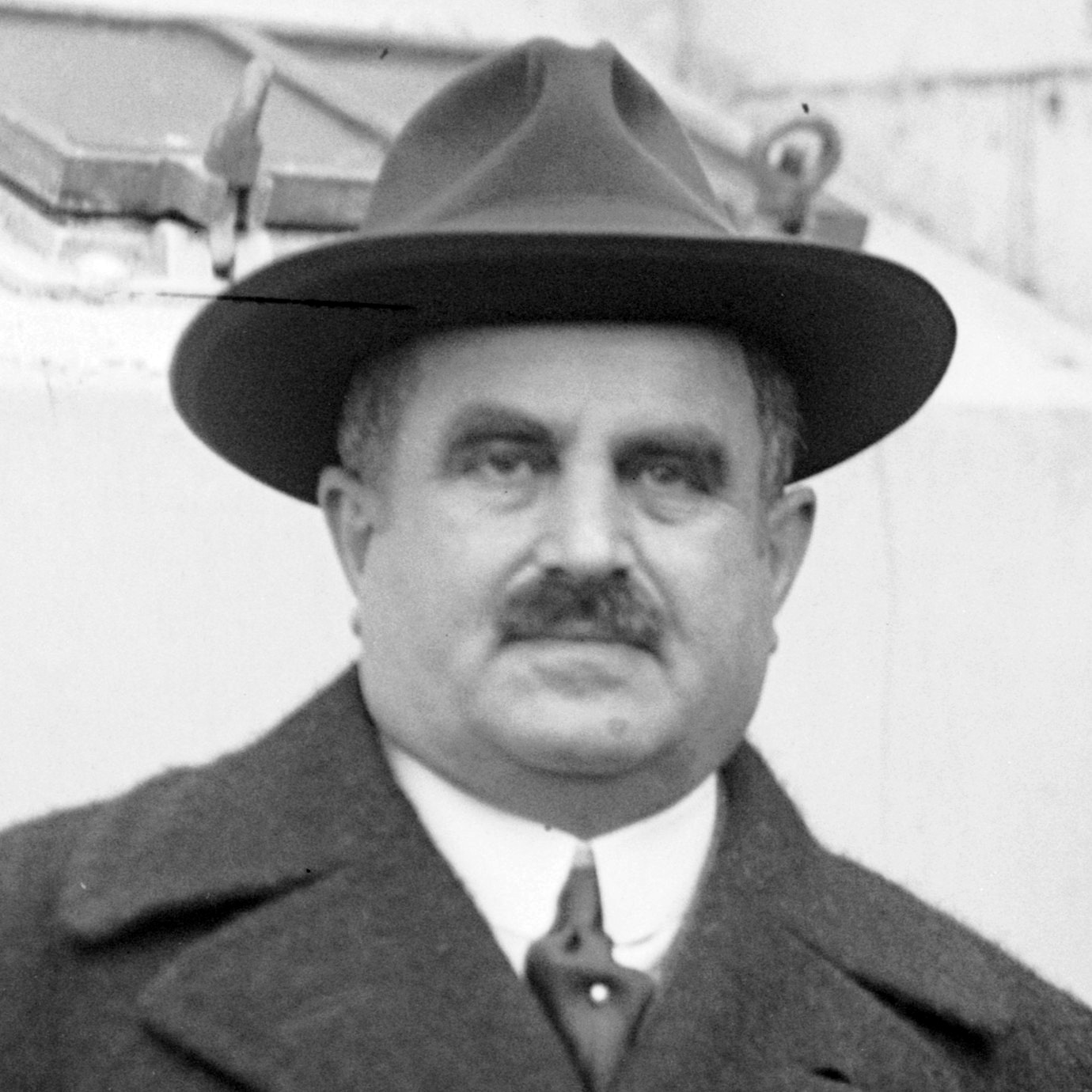
Paul Davidson, founder of Union-Film/PAGU

Davidson and Greenbaum (who had joined the board of PAGU in the takeover) travelled to the US together, seeking studios and film deals. On the way back they stopped off in Paris to make a deal with Pathé Frères, who bought (or leased) the Vitascope-Atelier studios in July 1914.

However, with the outbreak of the First World War, foreign production companies and their films were banned from Germany, and their assets confiscated. Domestic film production was allowed to boom. Pathé and PAGU broke off relationships; the admin offices and studios belonging to Pathé were placed into receivership, and reverted to Greenbaum.

Freed by the war from the foreign competition, Greenbaum founded Greenbaum-Film out of his old Deutsche Vitascope. On 12 January 1915 Greenbaum-Film was incorporated with 10,000 marks and started production again in 5–7 Franz-Josef-Straße, with a main office and sales at 235 Friedrichstraße. An article in Lichtbild-Bühne for 3 June 1915 announced: "Dr. Hans Oberländer, Richard Löwenbein, Richard Oswald, Greenbaum-Film GmbH – the biggest film factory in Germany." Oswald made five films in a few months, and then separated financially from Greenbaum-Film, becoming a self-employed producer and director.

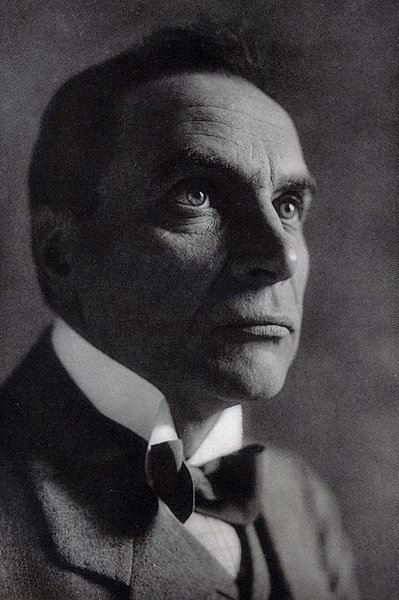
Albert Bassermann in 1918

In 1916 Greenbaum closed a deal with Albert Bassermann, who starred in seventeen films for Greenbaum-Film by 1920. The director Adolf Gärtner (who worked on Joe May's Stuart Webbs detective series) also moved to Greenbaum-Film and directed nine films in Weißensee. Greenbaum took out a further 5-year lease on the Weißensee premises from 4 January 1917 – 1922.

In February 1918 Ufa acquired Joe May's May-Film for 1 million marks. He shot the historical epic Veritas Vincit here towards the end of the war, with extra backing from Ufa, although it wasn't released until the spring of 1919.

In 1919 Greenbaum leased the whole premises, including the double glasshouse studios and film processing lab, to Joe May's Fema-Film Atelier GmbH (Fema=Hermann Fellner and Joe May) for 600,000 marks, which thenceforth became known as the May-Atelier. Fema-Film may be connected with Film Atelier GmbH (FAG) which bought the studios at 9 Franz Joseph-Straße at around the same time. See next section.

Greenbaum and May shot a number of detective series with success; for example, Greenbaum made the 'Phantomas' series with Erich Kaiser-Titz or Rolf Loer in the title role; and May, having split with Ernst Reicher, continued the gentleman detective theme with the long-running Joe Deebs series starring Max Landa and Harry Liedtke, later with e.g. Heinrich Schroth and directed by Harry Piel.

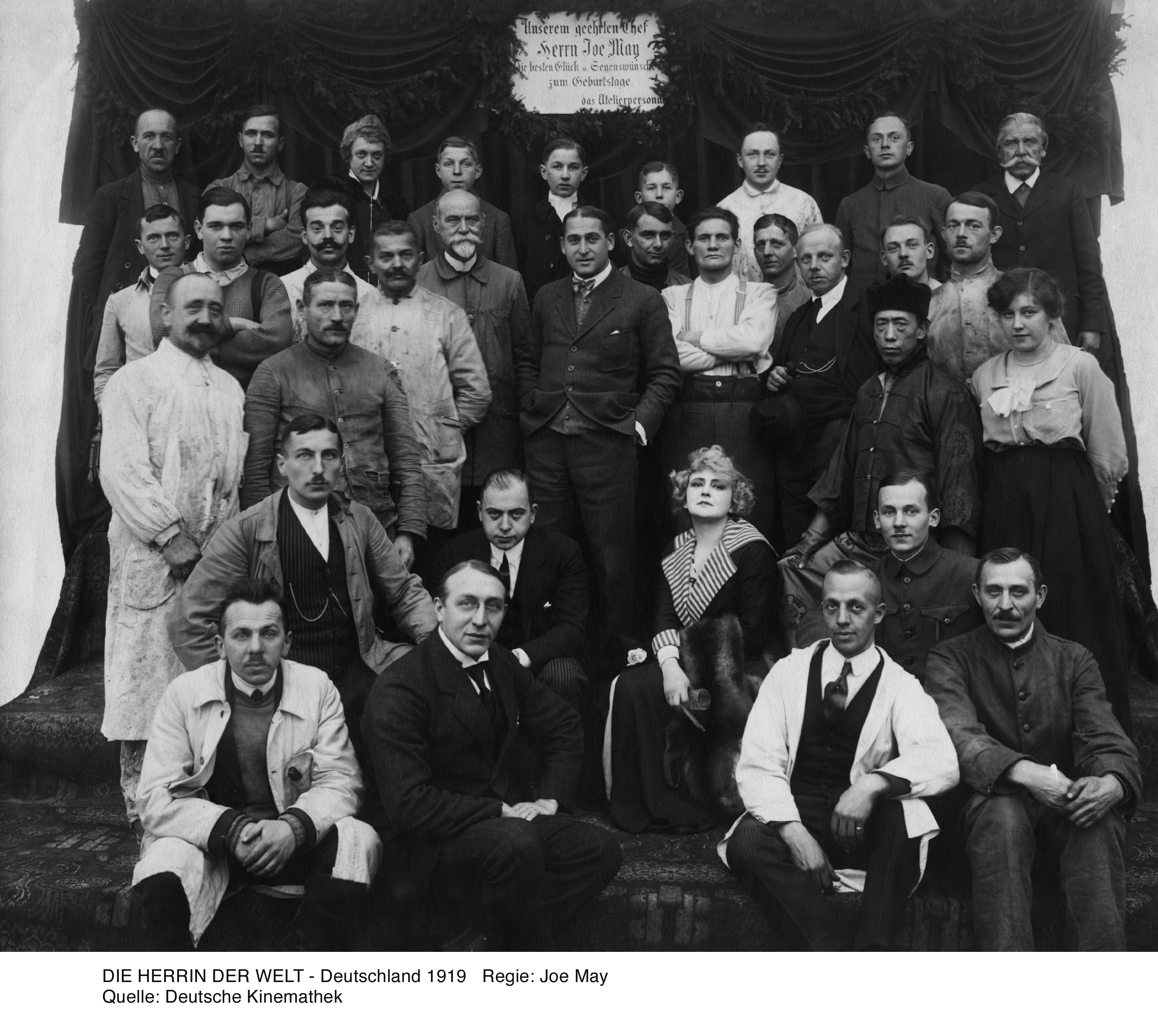
Joe May, standing center, hands in pockets, with cast and crew of Die Herrin der Welt.

At the same time, Joe May also created a huge film lot several miles to the east of Berlin which became the Filmstadt Woltersdorf, and also took over the huge Zeppelin sheds to create the Staaken Studios. All these studios including Weissensee were involved in shooting May's 8-part epic Die Herrin der Welt, released weekly from December 1919.

In 1919 Greenbaum joined the Ufa conglomerate, which the government had quietly established as the giant of German film industry during the war. Eric Pommer, as head of production at Ufa, concentrated his main efforts on producing quality "art films" (Großfilmen) with an international appeal. Greenbaum had a monopoly contract with Ufa to supply films to Ukraine, Bulgaria, Romania and Turkey. But Ukraine had suffered particularly badly during World War I with 1.5 million dead, followed by the Russian Civil War. The Russian famine of 1921–1922 killed a further five million people. The Balkans were also subject to considerable social and political upheaval after the war. This all led to considerably reduced profits; Ufa claimed millions from Greenbaum for lost sales and the dispute escalated through the courts. Ufa's interests were represented by Hemann Fellner, Greenbaum's former business partner. Ufa were victorious in the courts, leading to the virtual bankruptcy of Greenbaum-Film. Greenbaum lost the factory in Weissensee and everything else, and committed suicide in 1924 in a mental hospital aged 57. The studios were leased by Ufa after his death.

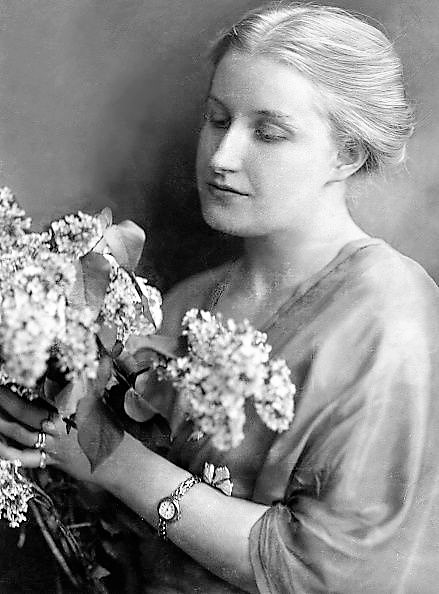
Thea von Harbou, Fritz Lang's collaborative partner and wife

In 1922 May bought the freehold of the site from the previous owner, a demolition company named Köhler. "Serious" dramas were also filmed at 5-7 Franz Josef-Straße where a group of new talents gathered around Joe May, such as the architect Martin Jacoby-Boy (for many years technical director of the studio), his successors Fritz Maurischat and Paul Leni (whose own company was also located in the May-Atelier and who shot Das Wachsfigurenkabinett here in 1924), the directors E. A. Dupont, Uwe Jens Krafft and Fritz Lang (who established his partnership with Thea von Harbou here).

Despite an issue of share certificates in 1924 by the mid-1920s May's film enterprises had run into financial difficulties, not least because of the somewhat chaotic and technically complex production of May-Film AG's The Farmer from Texas. This was one of the few films to be produced in Germany during the disastrous Parufamet contract, where Paramount Pictures and MGM stepped in to save Ufa which had nearly bankrupted itself in making hugely expensive films such as Lang's two-part epic fantasy Die Nibelungen.

One of the last films to be made at the studio was The Sporck Battalion (Die Sporck'schen Jäger), made by Carl Boese in November/December 1926. At the end of 1926 Ufa allowed its lease with the studios to expire, and part of the site was taken over by a laundry and dye works ('Wäscherei und Färberei H. Ide Nachfahrer'), which later expanded into the entire premises towards the end of the 1920s. During the DDR regime it was a subsidiary of the dry cleaning firm VEB Rewatex in Berlin-Spindlersfeld.

The Weissensee studio buildings were still in existence in 2017 - almost unchanged - in Liebermannstrasse, where the "Ide-Laundry section" of VEB Rewatex was located.

=== 9-12 Franz Josef-Straße ===
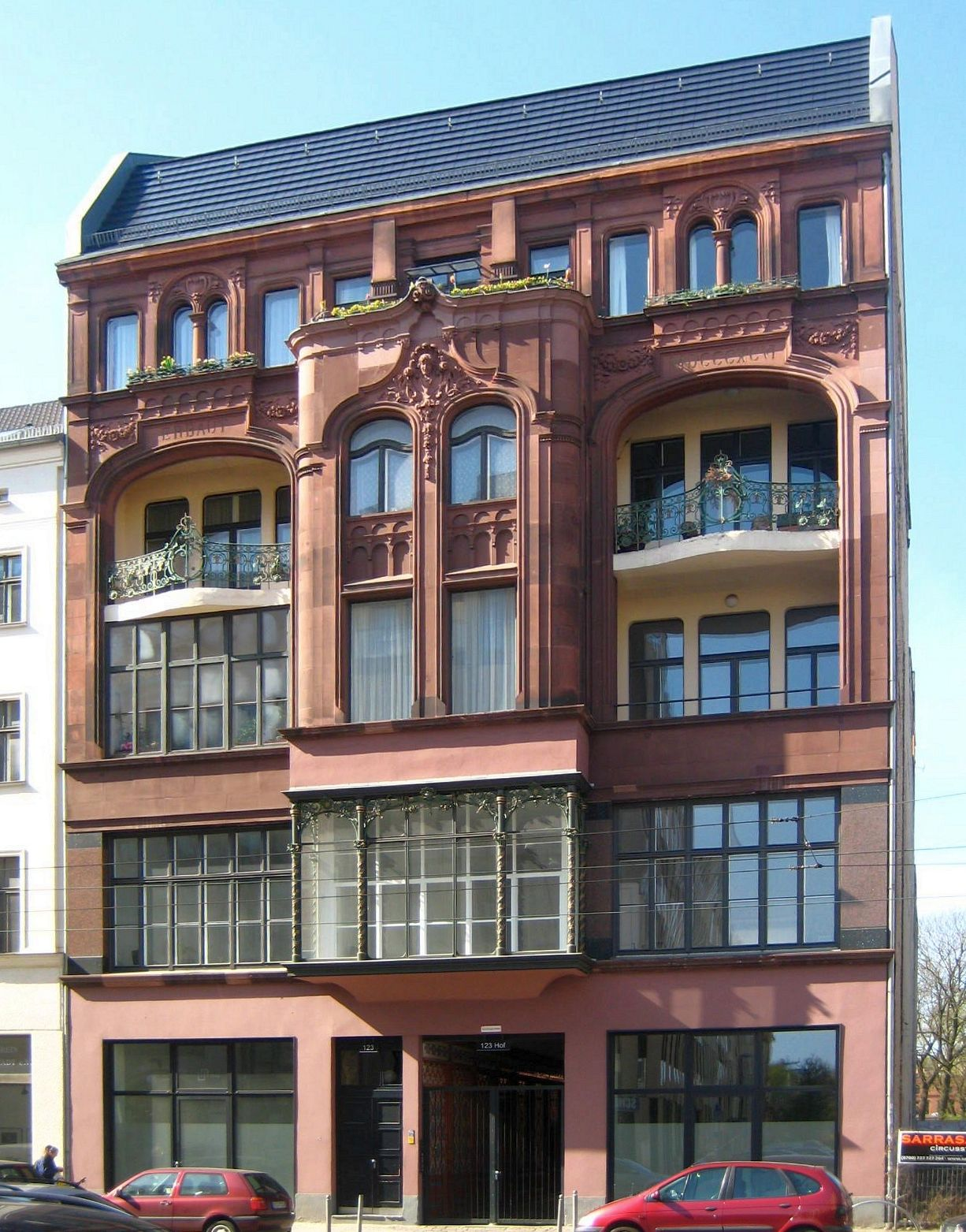
de:Chausseestraße 123, Berlin, the original studios of Continental-Kunstfilm from 1912

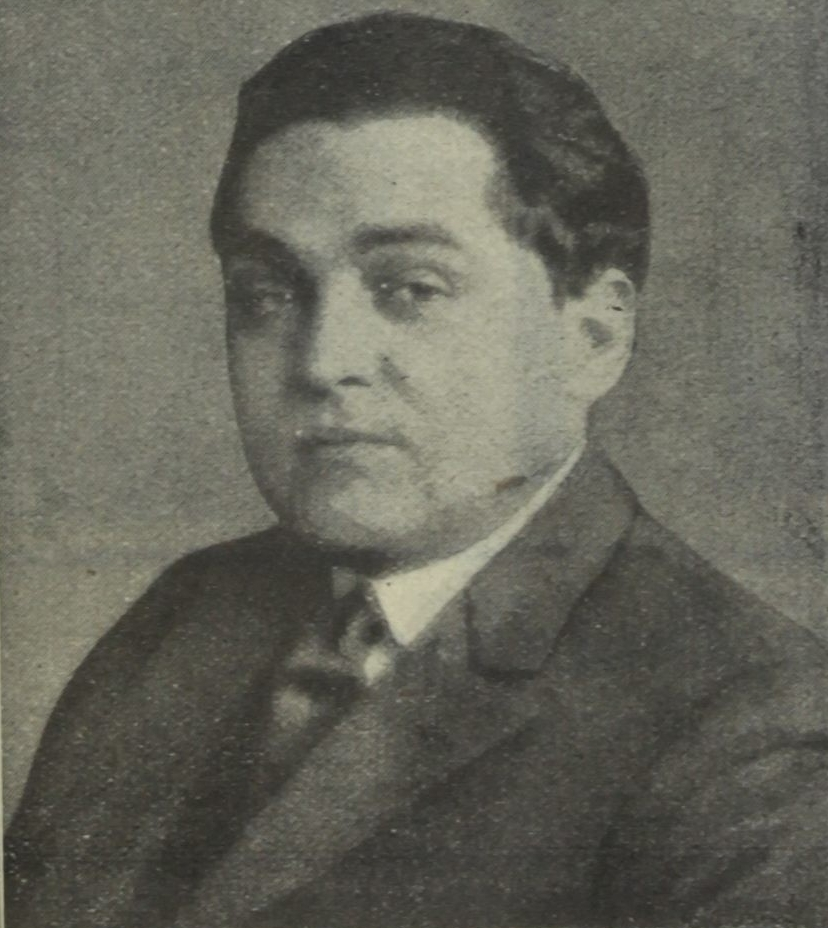
Erich Pommer, founder of Decla in around 1925

The second studio to be constructed was originally built by Continental-Kunstfilm at 9 (later 9–12) Franz Josef-Straße (now Liebermannstraße) in the summer of 1914 and which later came to be known as the Lixie-Atelier. It was separated from the studios at nos. 5–7 by the narrow plot of no. 8.

Joe May and Ernst Reicher who had already made three Stuart Webbs films at Continental's old studios at 123 Chauseestraße, split with the production managers of Continental and formed their own production company Stuart Webbs-Film, although they shot The Armoured Vault at Continental's old studio at 123 Chauseestrasse. May and Reicher split up soon after the start of World War I. Continental-Kunstfilm's own output fell off dramatically after 1915. Reicher leased the new studio at 9 Franz Josef-Straße from Continental and continued to make the 'Stuart Webbs' films with his Reicher & Reicher company until 1918, when he moved his entire production company to Munich. As noted above, May's Fema-Film Atelier GmbH company leased Greenbaum's Vitascope complex next door at nos. 5–7.

The next production company to use the studio at no. 9 appears to have been Decla, founded by Eric Pommer in February 1915. (Note: According to Ursula Hardt (Hardt 1996, p. 24), Decla had the use of a studio in Weissensee from 1915, but crucially this is not referenced, nor is the exact address given. Decla's printed stationery states an address of 'Friedrichstraße 22'.) Before the war Pommer had previously worked for the Austrian branch of the French company Gaumont in Vienna. At the same time, another French film production company, Éclair, which also sold its own brand of movie camera equipment, was looking to increase its presence in Austria. Pommer left Gaumont and established the Viennese subsidiary branch of Éclair in 1913 with Marcel Vandal and Charles Jourjon, answering directly to Paris and not through Berlin. After war broke out in August 1914 Pommer returned to Germany and won the Iron Cross in France in October 1914.

Before the war the German branch of Éclair (Deutsche Éclair) in Berlin had been run by Pommer's British friend Joe Powell. As noted previously, all the assets of foreign film production firms were confiscated by the German government soon after the start of the war, including Gaumont, Pathé and Éclair. Despite his being stationed at the front, Pommer (or his associates) along with Fritz Holz made a successful bid for the rights to Éclair's German assets. They formed the Decla-Film-Gesellschaft Holz & Co. in February 1915. Holz resigned in mid-1915. There is a possibility that the nascent Decla made some films at the studio at no. 9 Franz Josef-Straße, with the company being guided by Pommer's wife Gertrud, Erich Morawsky and/or Carl Wilhelm who also directed a number of its early films. Among the first 12 films produced by Decla in 1915 are: Der Barbier von Filmersdorf (première, Marmorhaus, June 1915): Der Glaube siegt (Victory of Faith) Sein Seitensprung (His Affair), Die Goldquelle, and O diese Männer, (all 1915).

Pommer was transferred to the Russian front in 1915, was wounded in the leg, and returned to Berlin in 1916. After being released from hospital in summer 1916 he trained recruits before joining Bild- und Filmamt (BuFA) in 1917. He was transferred as a sergeant to Romania in summer 1917, involved in military censorship of stage and film.

The studios were bought after the war in 1919 by Film-Atelier GmbH (FAG). The owner was Frau Cill-Gottscho of Philadelphia, USA, and the directors were Dr. Lucian Gottscho and Chaskel Eisenberg. (Note: For more information, see Continental-Kunstfilm.) FAG (Film-Atelier GmbH) may be connected with Joe May's Fema-Film Atelier GmbH (FFAG) which leased the studios at 5-7 Franz Joseph-Straße at around the same time. The property seems have been leased or sub-let to Lixie-Film around the same time, by which the studios subsequently became known as the Lixie-Atelier. (Note: FAG is listed in Berlin phonebooks as the owner of the property; Lixie shared the same address. Furthermore, the Lixie-Atelier is apparently only mentioned in Berlin cinema address books.)

At the start of his career, Fritz Lang worked for both Pommer at Decla, and Joe May. After the war Decla "only had a small studio in Weissensee" and Lang's first films were shot in studios rented from other producers, including Ufa's Tempelhof.

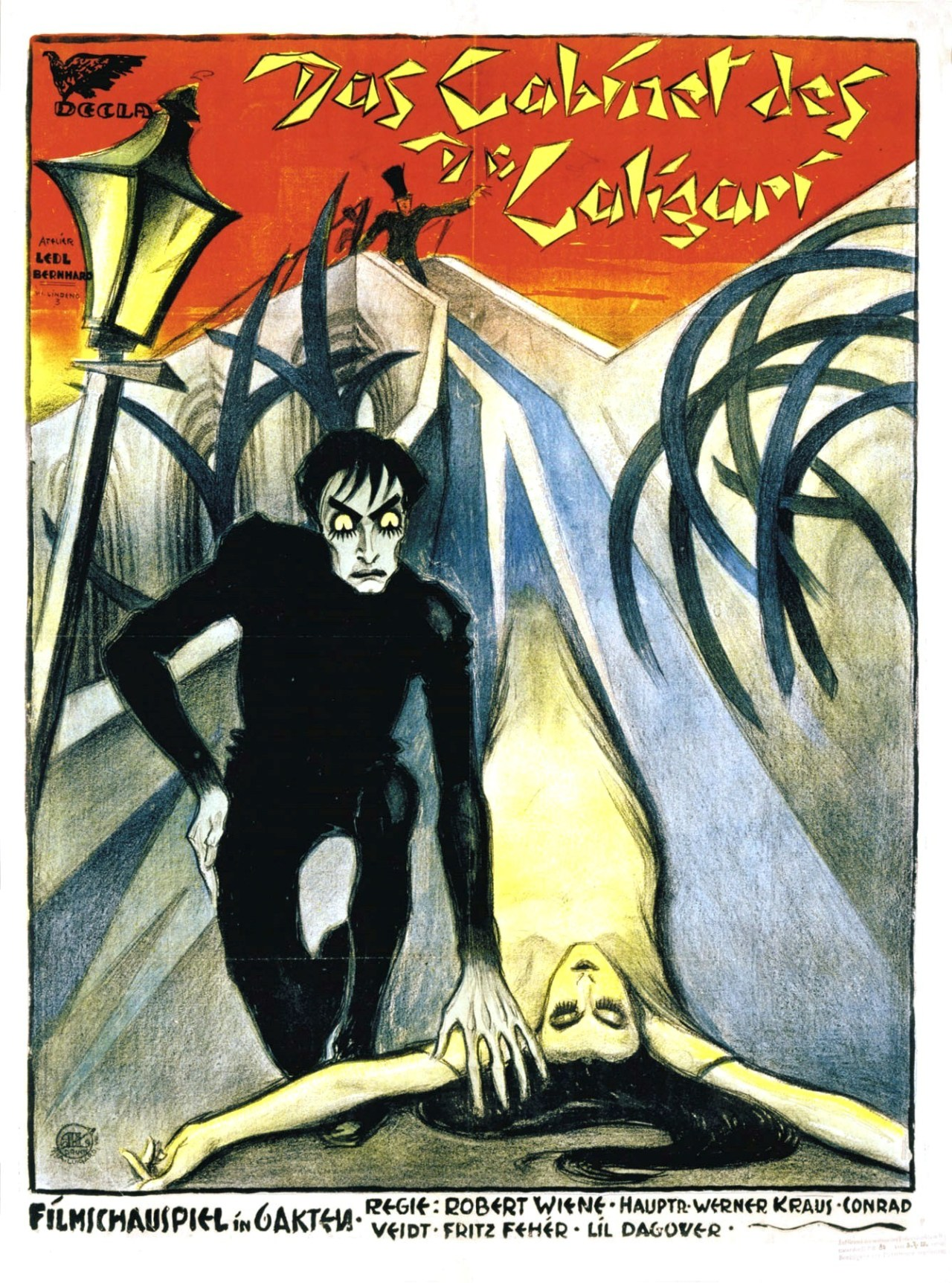
Theatrical release poster for Das Cabinet des Dr. Caligari

Decla used the studio during the production of at least three titles: Otto Rippert's historical spectacular 7-reeler Pest in Florenz, with a script by Fritz Lang (some interior scenes only). Journalists were invited to the Weissensee studios to watch some of the shooting in September 1919, arriving in carriages and rented cars paid for by Decla. This sort of treatment went down well, and the film received excellent reviews. The Weissensee studio, sometimes referred to as the Decla-Atelier, was also used for some interiors in Part 2 of Lang's own Die Spinnen; and, most famously, for the whole of Robert Wiene's oppressive horror Das Cabinet des Dr. Caligari, from December 1919 to January 1920. The studio still only occupied the original plot of no. 9, and its somewhat cramped nature influenced what could be achieved by the set designers. (Note: Robinson 1997, pp. 25, 28. NB Robinson, usually painstaking, is mistaken here in his identification of the studio used.)

In about April 1920 Decla merged with Bioscop-Film (which had been sold by Jules Greenbaum to Carl Schleussner in 1908–09) to form Decla-Bioscop AG, which brought the much larger Babelsberg Studios to the new partnership. (Note: Decla-Bioscop AG has often been mistakenly credited with producing or distributing various films in 1919, well before it ever came into existence in April 1920. Before the merger the firm was simply called Decla-Film.) The following year the merged firm was itself absorbed into the larger UFA conglomerate which owned further assets in the German capital including the Tempelhof Studios.

FAG enlarged the studio in c.1920 by building on the vacant site of nos. 10–12, to create 9–12 Franz-Josef Strasse. Lixie-Film-Atelier-Weißensee GmbH bought the studios in 1921, and later joined with a number of other production companies not included in the UFA conglomerate to take over the disused studios of Deutsche Mutoskop- und Biograph GmbH in the Lankwitz district in 1924/25, founding the Muto-Großatelier für Filmherstellung (Muto-Atelier).

In 1928 the Weißensee housing association acquired the land for new residential buildings which were still standing as of 2012.

== Selected filmography ==
The film output of the various production companies discussed above was always entirely independent, and the "Weissensee Studios" never existed as any sort of corporate identity. No films were ever released by any entity named "Weissensee Studios" or "Filmstadt Weißensee".

- Laugh Bajazzo (1915) - Richard Oswald for Vitascope
- The Diamond Foundation (1917)
- The Ghost Hunt (1918)
- The Spiders (1919)
- The Plague of Florence (1919)
- The Cabinet of Dr. Caligari (1920)
- Evening – Night – Morning (1920)
- Die Erlebnisse einer Kammerzofe (1922)
- The Wooing of Eve (1926)
