= Emanuel Reicher =

German actor

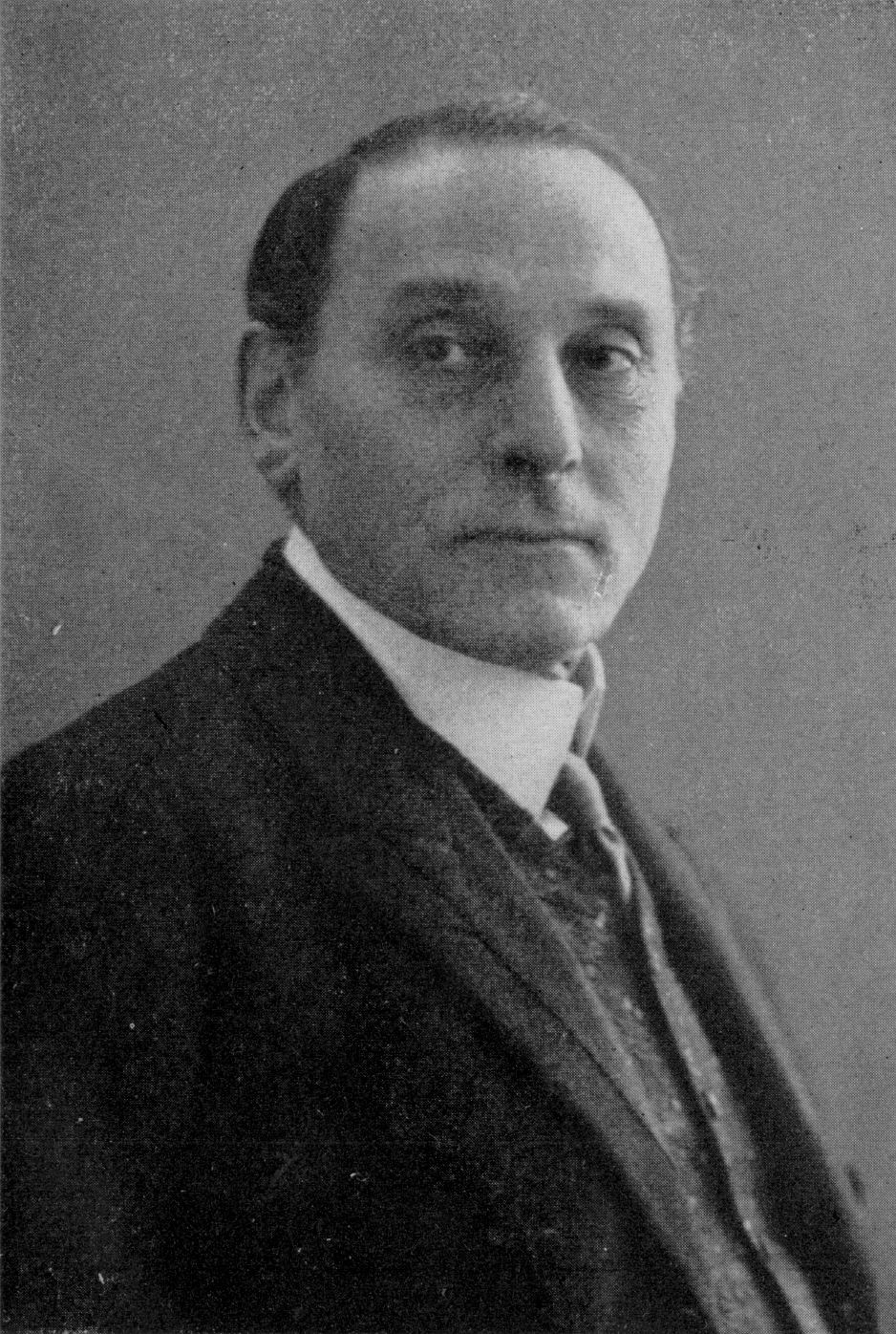
Emanuel Reicher

Emanuel Reicher (18 June 1849 – 15 May 1924) was a German actor. He was father to actors Ernst Reicher and Frank Reicher and actress Hedwiga Reicher.

After his successful acting debut in Munich in 1873 he obtained a contract with the Residenz Theater in Berlin, where he became known as one of the best German Shakespearean actors. He then took over management of the Theatre school. He played Alfred Allmers in the first performance of Henrik Ibsen's Little Eyolf at the Deutsches Theatre, Berlin, on January 12, 1895. In 1889 he was one of the founders of the theatre society "Free Stage" (Freie Bühne).

In 1907 the actor Curt Goetz studied under him. Reicher was an Esperantist, and in 1908 he appeared, along with his daughter Hedwig, in Iphigenie auf Tauris by Goethe, at the Esperanto World Congress in Dresden.

Later he went to the US, where he was when World War I broke out. He became Director of the New York Theatre Guild, where he promoted the new style of the German theatre. He returned to Germany in 1923.

== Family life ==
Emmanuel Reicher married firstly the opera singer Hedwig Reicher-Kindermann (15 July 1853 – 2 June 1883): their son was the actor Frank Reicher. After Hedwig's death he married Lina Harf: their children were Hedwiga Reicher, Ernst Reicher and Elly (b. Berlin 1893), who all worked as actors.

== Selected filmography ==
- I.N.R.I. (1923)
