= Masks (1929 film) =

1929 film directed by Rudolf Meinert

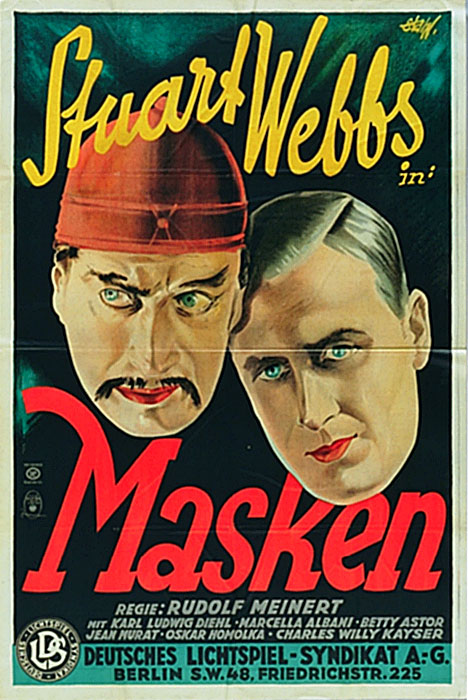
- Directed by: Rudolf Meinert
- Written by: Guido Kreutzer (novel); Rudolf Meinert
- Starring: Karl Ludwig Diehl; Trude Berliner; Marcella Albani; Charles Willy Kayser
- Cinematography: Günther Krampf
- Production company: Omnia-Film
- Distributed by: Deutsche Lichtspiel-Syndikat
- Release date: 4 March 1930
- Running time: 79 minutes
- Country: Germany
- Languages: Silent; German intertitles

Masks (German: Masken) is a 1929 German silent crime film directed by Rudolf Meinert and starring Karl Ludwig Diehl, Trude Berliner and Marcella Albani. It was the second film made by Meinert featuring the detective hero Stuart Webbs following The Green Monocle (1929). It was shot at the Grunewald Studios in Berlin. The film's sets were designed by the art director Hermann Warm.

== Cast ==
- Karl Ludwig Diehl as Stuart Webbs
- Trude Berliner as Mary
- Marcella Albani as Elyane
- Charles Willy Kayser as Bankier Clifford
- Hans Schickler as Jankins
- Jean Murat as Jonny
- Betty Astor as Goldelse
- Borwin Walth as Kommissar Black
- Gerhard Dammann as Wirt Pitt
- Oskar Homolka as Breitkopf
- Robert Klein-Lörk as Charly

== Bibliography ==
- Prawer, S.S. Between Two Worlds: The Jewish Presence in German and Austrian Film, 1910–1933. Berghahn Books, 2007.
