= The Leap in the Dark =

1920 film

- Directed by: Ernst Reicher
- Written by: Ernst Reicher; Alfred Schirokauer
- Starring: Ernst Reicher
- Cinematography: Max Fassbender
- Production company: Stuart Webbs-Film
- Distributed by: Orbis-Film
- Release date: 27 July 1920
- Country: Germany
- Languages: Silent; German intertitles

The Leap in the Dark (German:Der Sprung ins Dunkle) is a 1920 German silent mystery film directed by and starring Ernst Reicher as the detective character Stuart Webbs, part of a long-running series of silent films.

== Cast ==
- Lia Eibenschütz
- Stella Harf
- Ernst Reicher as Detective Stuart Webbs

== Bibliography ==
- Rainey, Buck. Serials and Series: A World Filmography, 1912-1956. McFarland, 2015.
