= The Malay Junk =

1924 film

- Directed by: Max Obal
- Written by: Viktor Klein; Paul Langenscheidt (novel)
- Produced by: Ernst Reicher
- Starring: Ernst Reicher; Alexandra Sorina
- Production company: Münchner Lichtspielkunst
- Distributed by: Bavaria Film
- Release date: 24 October 1924
- Country: Germany
- Languages: Silent; German intertitles

The Malay Junk (German:Die malayische Dschonke) is a 1924 German silent crime film directed by Max Obal and starring Ernst Reicher and Alexandra Sorina. It features the fictional detective Stuart Webbs, who was popular during the silent era. It was made at the Emelka Studios in Munich.

== Cast ==
- Ernst Reicher as Stuart Webbs
- Alexandra Sorina
- Ernst Bosser
- Claire Kronburger
- Arnold Marlé
- John Mylong
- Magda Simon

== Bibliography ==
- Rainey, Buck. Serials and Series: A World Filmography, 1912-1956. McFarland, 2015.
