= Die Peitsche =

1916 German film

- Directed by: Adolf Gärtner
- Written by: Fritz Lang
- Produced by: Ernst Reicher
- Starring: Ernst Reicher
- Production company: Stuart Webbs Film Studio
- Distributed by: Richard Kühn (Berlin)
- Release date: December 1916
- Running time: 85 minutes
- Country: Germany
- Languages: Silent; German intertitles

Die Peitsche (English: The Whip or The Lash) is a 1916 German crime film in the popular Stuart Webbs detective film series. It is considered to be a lost film.

== Plot ==
Detective Stuart Webbs investigates the disappearance of valuable diamond jewellery.

== Cast ==
- Ernst Reicher as Stuart Webbs
- Esther Carena as Mutter Bert
- Rely Ridon as Neger
- Kurt Busch
- Mila de Paula
- Julius Markov
- Magda Madeleine

== Background ==
Die Peitsche was filmed at the Stuart Webbs Film Studio in Berlin-Weißensee. It was produced by the Stuart Webbs Film Company Reicher & Reicher (Berlin).

According to film producer Erich Pommer, the screenplay for Die Peitsche was written by Fritz Lang. However, since no other information about the screenwriter has survived, it must be considered uncertain whether the screenplay was actually written by Lang.

The film, which is considered lost, has a length of four or five acts and a total running time of 1,560 metres. This corresponds to a running time of approximately 85 minutes. The premiere took place in December 1916 at the Marmorhaus in Berlin.

The Berlin police issued a ban on its use by minors (No. 40112), and the Munich police demanded that it not be advertised as a detective film (Nos. 23152, 23153, 23154, 23155). From 1921 onwards, Richard Kühn (Berlin) took over the film distribution. The Weimar Republic Reich Film Censorship Office in Berlin imposed a ban on its use by minors on 15 June 1921 (No. 3454).

== See also ==
- List of lost films
