= Camera Obscura (1921 film) =

1921 film directed by Max Obal

- Directed by: Max Obal
- Written by: Ernst Reicher; Alfred Schirokauer
- Produced by: Ernst Reicher
- Starring: Ernst Reicher; Alexander Granach; Walter Dysing
- Cinematography: Max Fassbender
- Production company: Stuart Webbs-Film
- Release date: 23 April 1921
- Country: Germany
- Languages: Silent; German intertitles

Camera Obscura is a 1921 German silent mystery film directed by Max Obal and starring Ernst Reicher, Alexander Granach, and Walter Dysing. It was part of the Stuart Webbs series of detective films.

== Cast ==
- Ernst Reicher as Stuart Webbs
- Alexander Granach as Der große Chef
- Walter Dysing
- Martha Maria Newes

== Bibliography ==
- Köster, Thomas (1995). Bilderschrift Grossstadt: Studien zum Werk Robert Müllers (in German). Paderborn: Igel Verlag. ISBN 978-3-927104-99-0.
