= Alfred Schirokauer =

German novelist and screenwriter (1880–1934)

- Born: 13 July 1880; Breslau, German Empire
- Died: 27 October 1934 (aged 54); Vienna, Austria
- Occupations: Writer, Director
- Years active: 1913–1934 (film)

Alfred Schirokauer (13 July 1880 – 27 October 1934) was a German novelist and screenwriter. He also directed three films during the silent era. Many films were based on his novels including several adaptations of Lucrezia Borgia. After the rise of the Nazi Party to power in 1933 the Jewish Schirokauer emigrated to Amsterdam and then to Austria where he died the following year.

== Novels ==
- Die graue Macht (1910)
- Ferdinand Lassalle. Ein Leben für Freiheit und Liebe (1912)
- Lukrezia Borgia (1925)
- Die Frau von gestern und morgen (1928)
- Die unmögliche Liebe (1929)
- Paiva, Queen of Love (1935)

== Play ==
- Karriere (with Paul Rosenhayn, 1924)

== Selected filmography ==
- Ferdinand Lassalle, directed by Rudolf Meinert (Germany, 1918, based on the novel Ferdinand Lassalle. Ein Leben für Freiheit und Liebe)
- Die graue Macht, directed by Fred Stranz (Germany, 1923, based on the novel Die graue Macht)
- The Woman of Yesterday and Tomorrow, directed by Heinz Paul (Germany, 1928, based on the novel Die Frau von gestern und morgen)
- Careers, directed by John Francis Dillon (1929, based on the play Karriere)
- Impossible Love, directed by Erich Waschneck (Germany, 1932, based on the novel Die unmögliche Liebe)
- Lucrezia Borgia, directed by Abel Gance (France, 1935, based on the novel Lukrezia Borgia)
- Lucrezia Borgia, directed by Luis Bayón Herrera (Argentina, 1947, based on the novel Lukrezia Borgia)
- Idol of Paris, directed by Leslie Arliss (UK, 1948, based on the novel Paiva, Queen of Love)
- Lucrèce Borgia, directed by Christian-Jaque (France, 1953, based on the novel Lukrezia Borgia)

=== Screenwriter ===
- Werner Krafft (1916)
- George Bully (1920)
- The Leap in the Dark (1920)
- The Night of Decision (1920)
- The Big Boss (1921)
- The Fountain of Madness (1921)
- Camera Obscura (1921)
- The Favourite of the Queen (1922)
- The Path to God (1924)
- The Lion of Venice (1924)
- A Woman for 24 Hours (1925)
- Your Desire Is Sin (1925)
- The Flower Woman of Potsdam Square (1925)
- The Dealer from Amsterdam (1925)
- Cock of the Roost (1925)
- Cab No. 13 (1926)
- The Flight in the Night (1926)
- Circus Romanelli (1926)
- Tea Time in the Ackerstrasse (1926)
- Students' Love (1927)
- The Orlov (1927)
- The Girl Without a Homeland (1927)
- The Hunt for the Bride (1927)
- Intoxicated Love (1927)
- The Island of Forbidden Kisses (1927)
- A Day of Roses in August (1927)
- Poor Little Colombine (1927)
- Always Be True and Faithful (1927)
- Heaven on Earth (1927)
- Adam and Eve (1928)
- Herkules Maier (1928)
- Autobus Number Two (1929)
- The Runaway Princess (1929)
- Miss Midshipman (1929)
- Storm of Love (1929)
- Marriage in Name Only (1930)
- Boycott (1930)
- Two People (1930)
- The Case of Colonel Redl (1931)
- Cadets (1931)
- Student Life in Merry Springtime (1931)
- Elisabeth of Austria (1931)
- De Familie van mijn Vrouw (1935)

== Bibliography ==
- John T. Soister. Conrad Veidt on Screen: A Comprehensive Illustrated Filmography. McFarland, 2002.
