= The Grey Magpie =

1920 film

- Directed by: Max Obal
- Written by: Max Obal; Rudolf Steinmetz
- Produced by: Ernst Reicher
- Starring: Ernst Reicher
- Production company: Stuart Webbs-Film
- Release date: 14 May 1920
- Running time: 73 minutes
- Country: Germany
- Languages: Silent; German intertitles

The Grey Magpie (German: Die graue Elster) is a 1920 German silent mystery film directed by Max Obal and starring Ernst Reicher as the detective Stuart Webbs, part of a long-running series featuring the character.

== Cast ==
In alphabetical order

- Paul Bergson as Dr. Maxen
- Anneliese Halbe as Frau Birnsen
- Grete Jakobsen as Setty, genannt 'die graue Elster'
- H. Link as Bankdirektor Birnsen
- Ernst Reicher as Stuart Webbs
- Robert Stöckel as Briks

== Bibliography ==
- Rainey, Buck. Serials and Series: A World Filmography, 1912-1956. McFarland, 2015.
