= The Man in the Cellar =

- Directed by: Joe May
- Written by: Ernst Reicher
- Starring: Ernst Reicher; Max Landa; Olga Engl
- Cinematography: Max Fassbender
- Production company: Continental-Kunstfilm
- Release date: 20 March 1914
- Running time: 44 minutes
- Country: Germany
- Languages: Silent; German intertitles

The Man in the Cellar (German: Der Mann im Keller) is a 1914 German silent thriller film directed by Joe May and starring Ernst Reicher, Max Landa and Olga Engl. It was part of a series of films featuring the fictional detective Stuart Webbs.

The film's sets were designed by the art director Paul Leni.

== Cast ==
- Ernst Reicher as Stuart Webbs
- Max Landa as Lord Thomas Rawson
- Olga Engl as Baronin de Lille
- Alice Hechy as Lady Grace
- Gerhard Dammann as Luny
- Eduard Rothauser
- Josef Schelepa

== Bibliography ==
- Ken Wlaschin. Silent Mystery and Detective Movies: A Comprehensive Filmography. McFarland, 2009.
