= The Oath of Peter Hergatz =

1921 film

- Directed by: Alfred Halm
- Written by: Mila de la Chapelle
- Starring: Emil Jannings; Stella Harf; Ernst Stahl-Nachbaur; Mila de la Chapelle
- Cinematography: Karl Freund
- Production company: Sächsische Kunstfilm
- Distributed by: Centropa-Filmverleih
- Release date: 2 June 1921
- Country: Germany
- Languages: Silent; German intertitles

The Oath of Peter Hergatz (German: Der Schwur des Peter Hergatz) is a 1921 German silent drama film directed by Alfred Halm and starring Emil Jannings, Stella Harf, and Ernst Stahl-Nachbaur. It premiered in Leipzig on 2 June 1921.

== Cast ==
- Emil Jannings
- Stella Harf
- Ernst Stahl-Nachbaur
- Mila de la Chapelle

== Bibliography ==
- Grange, William. Cultural Chronicle of the Weimar Republic. Scarecrow Press, 2008.
