= Artur Günther =

German art director

- Born: 9 December 1893; Potsdam, German Empire
- Died: 9 February 1972 (aged 78); West Berlin, West Germany
- Occupation: Art director
- Years active: 1917-1965 (film)

Artur Günther (1893–1972) was a German art director. He designed the sets for more than a hundred films during a lengthy career.

== Selected filmography ==
- When the Dead Speak (1917)
- Ikarus, the Flying Man (1918)
- Alraune, die Henkerstochter, genannt die rote Hanne (1918)
- The Princess of the Nile (1920)
- The Eyes of the World (1920)
- The Medium (1921)
- La Boheme (1923)
- The Doomed (1924)
- The Man in the Saddle (1925)
- Malice (1926)
- Fedora (1926)
- Tragedy of a Marriage (1927)
- The Harbour Bride (1927)
- When the Young Wine Blossoms (1927)
- German Women - German Faithfulness (1927)
- The Battle of Bademunde (1931)
- The Invisible Front (1932)
- Jumping Into the Abyss (1933)
- Enjoy Yourselves (1934)
- Decoy (1934)
- The Island (1934)
- The Foolish Virgin (1935)
- The Man with the Paw (1935)
- The Saint and Her Fool (1935)
- Counsel for Romance (1936)
- The Unknown (1936)
- The Call of the Jungle (1936)
- Carousel (1937)
- Meiseken (1937)
- Fools in the Snow (1938)
- The Night of Decision (1938)
- Mistake of the Heart (1939)
- Stars of Variety (1939)
- The Eternal Tone (1943)
- Quartet of Five (1949)
- Friday the Thirteenth (1949)
- The Last Year (1951)
- The Call of the Sea (1951)
- Swelling Melodies (1955)

== Bibliography ==
- Giesen, Rolf. Nazi Propaganda Films: A History and Filmography. McFarland, 2003.
