= Stella Harf =

German actress (1890–1979)

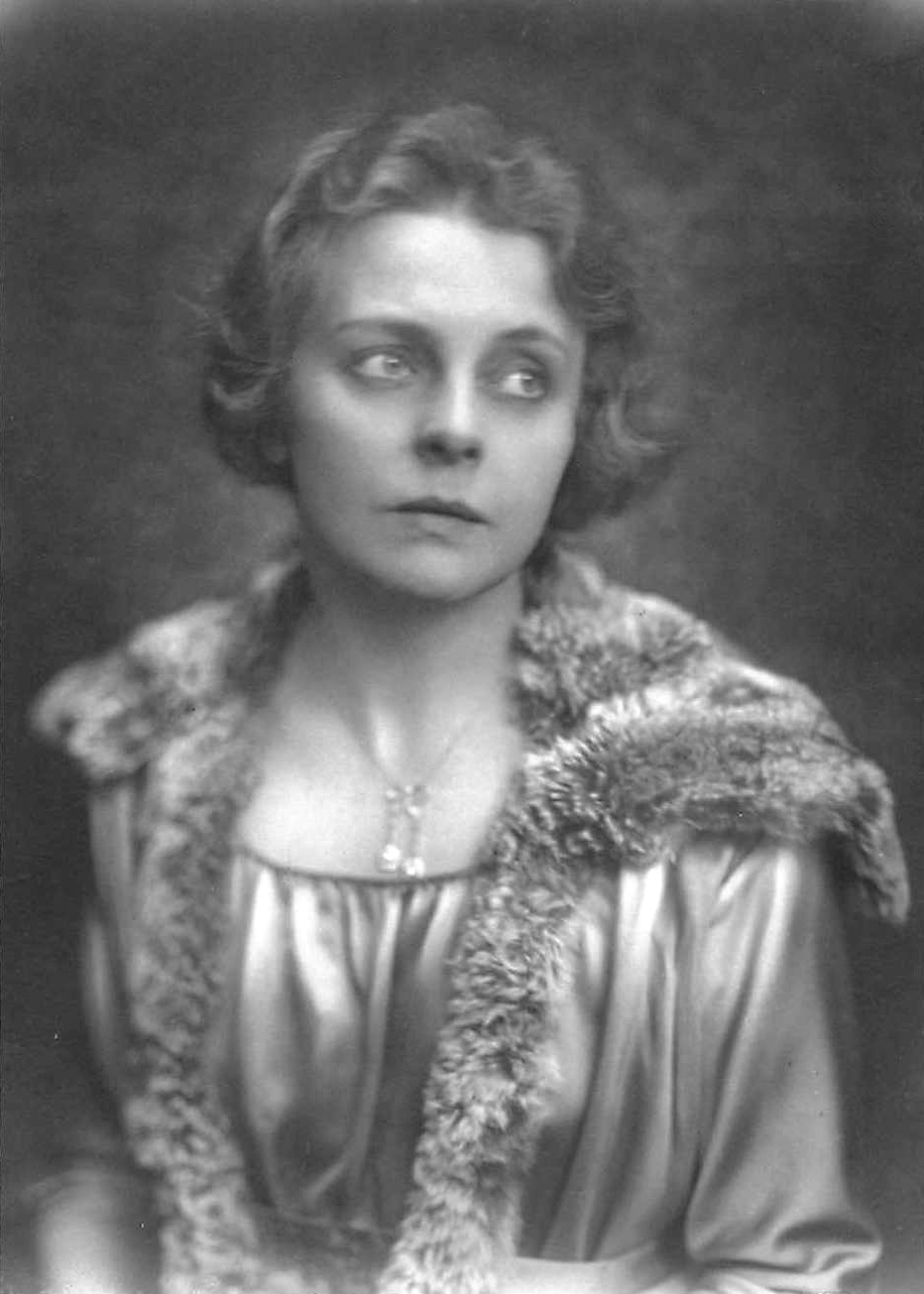
- Harf ca. 1920
- Born: Johanna Gertrud Weybrecht; 12 August 1890; Dresden, German Empire
- Died: 3 January 1979 (aged 88); West Berlin, West Germany
- Occupation: Actor
- Years active: 1917-1929
- Spouse: Ernst Reicher

Stella Harf (born Johanna Gertrud Weybrecht; 12 August 1890 – 3 January 1979) was a German stage and film actress.

== Selected filmography ==
- Panic in the House of Ardon (1920)
- George Bully (1920)
- The Leap in the Dark (1920)
- The Oath of Peter Hergatz (1921)
- Jägerblut (1922)
- Professor Nardi (1925)
- Napoleon at St. Helena (1929)

== Bibliography ==
- Jung, Uli & Schatzberg, Walter. Beyond Caligari: The Films of Robert Wiene. Berghahn Books, 1999.
