= Sporting Chance (film) =

1931 drama film directed by Albert Herman

- Directed by: Albert Herman
- Written by: King Baggot
- Produced by: Albert Herman
- Cinematography: Earl Fox Walker
- Edited by: Earle Neville
- Production company: Peerless Pictures Corporation
- Distributed by: Peerless Productions; States Rights
- Release date: November 21, 1931
- Running time: 63 or 69 minutes
- Country: United States
- Language: English

Sporting Chance is a 1931 drama film directed and produced by Albert Herman, and written by King Baggot. The film was released on 21 November 1931 by Peerless Pictures Corporation and States Rights.

== Plot ==
Terry Nolan, a jockey, becomes conceited after achieving success on the racetrack. Eventually, he is suspended for disobedience. Phillip Lawrence, the playboy son of Terry's boss, Phillip Lawrence, Sr., gives Terry the chance to redeem himself in a steeplechase race.

== Cast ==
- William Collier Jr. as Terry Nolan
- Claudia Dell as Mary Bascom
- James Hall as Phillip Lawrence
- Eugene Jackson as Horseshoes
- Mahlon Hamilton as Buddy
- Hedwiga Reicher as Aunt Hetty
- Joseph Levering as Phillip Lawrence, Sr.
- Henry Roquemore as Mullins
