= Carlos and Elisabeth =

1924 film by Richard Oswald

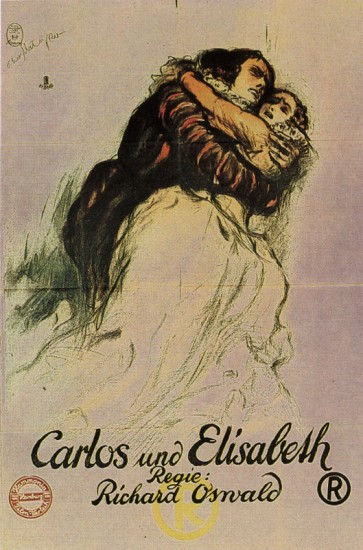
- Directed by: Richard Oswald
- Written by: Friedrich Schiller (play); Ludwig Fulda; Richard Oswald
- Produced by: Richard Oswald
- Starring: Conrad Veidt; Eugen Klöpfer; Aud Egede-Nissen; Dagny Servaes
- Cinematography: Karl Hasselmann; Karl Puth; Theodor Sparkuhl; Károly Vass
- Music by: Willy Schmidt-Gentner
- Production company: Richard-Oswald-Produktion
- Release date: 26 February 1924
- Running time: 115 minutes
- Country: Germany
- Languages: Silent; German intertitles

Carlos and Elisabeth (German: Carlos und Elisabeth) is a 1924 German silent historical drama film directed by Richard Oswald and starring Conrad Veidt, Eugen Klöpfer, and Aud Egede-Nissen. It is based on the play Don Carlos by Friedrich Schiller. Oswald modelled the film's visuals on a staging of the play by Max Reinhardt at the Deutsches Theater.

The film's sets were designed by the art director Oscar Friedrich Werndorff.

== Cast ==
- Conrad Veidt as Don Carlos
- Eugen Klöpfer as Prince Philip
- Aud Egede-Nissen as Princess Eboli
- William Dieterle as Marquis Posa
- Adolf Klein as Grand Inquisitor
- Robert Taube as Duke of Alba
- Friedrich Kühne as Don Perez, the Dukeäs Minister
- Rudolf Biebrach as Duke of Valois
- Dagny Servaes as Elisabeth von Valois
- Martin Herzberg as Don Carlos as a boy

== Bibliography ==
- Eisner, Lotte H. (2008) [1952]. The Haunted Screen: Expressionism in the German Cinema and the Influence of Max Reinhardt. Translated by Greaves, Roger. Berkeley: University of California Press. ISBN 978-0-520-25790-0.
