= Robert Taube =

German actor

Robert Taube (1880 – 1961) was a Russian-born German stage and film actor.

== Selected filmography ==
- I.N.R.I. (1923)
- Carlos and Elisabeth (1924)
- The Woman Who Did (1925)
- Das leichte Mädchen (1941)
- Andreas Schlüter (1942)
- The Blue Swords (1949)

== Bibliography ==
- Eisner, Lotte H. The Haunted Screen: Expressionism in the German Cinema and the Influence of Max Reinhardt. University of California Press, 2008.
