= The Leopard Lady =

1928 film

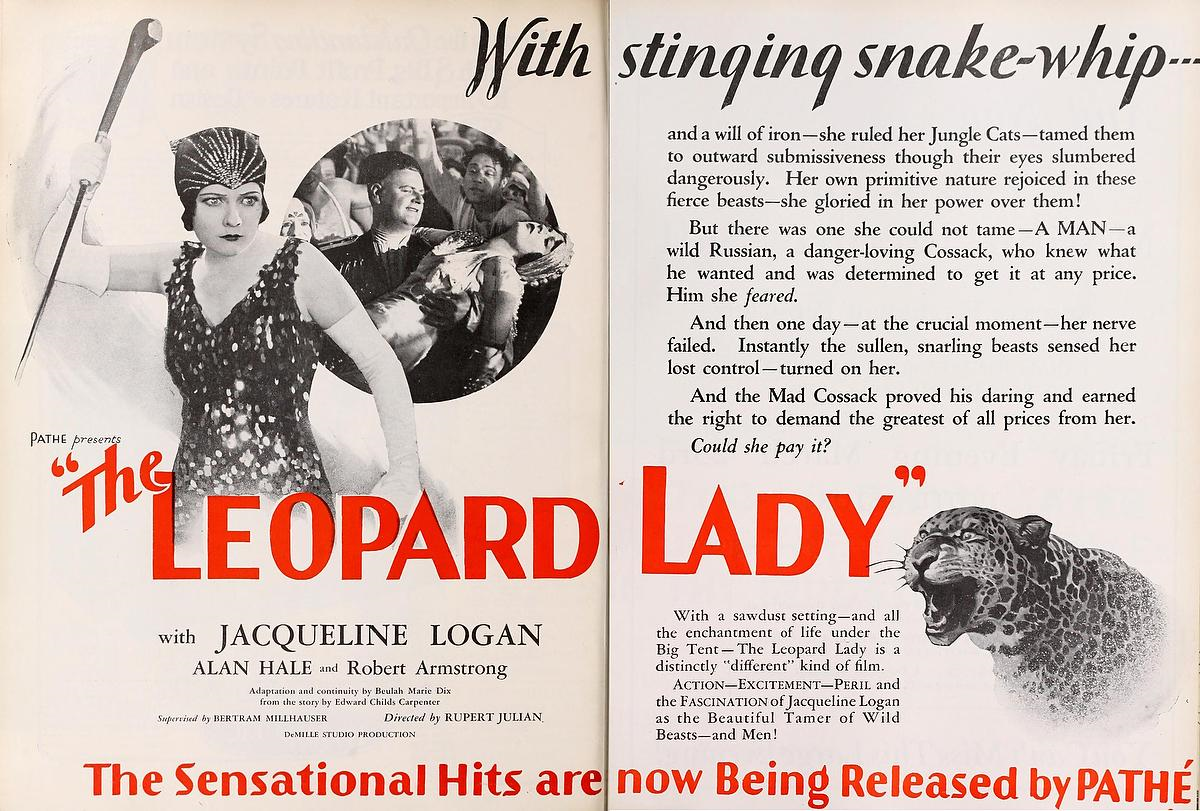
- Directed by: Rupert Julian
- Written by: Beulah Marie Dix; Edward Childs Carpenter (play)
- Produced by: Bertram Millhauser
- Starring: Jacqueline Logan; Alan Hale; Robert Armstrong
- Cinematography: John J. Mescall
- Edited by: Claude Berkeley
- Production company: DeMille Pictures Corporation
- Distributed by: Pathé Exchange
- Release date: January 22, 1928
- Running time: 70 minutes
- Country: United States
- Languages: Silent; English intertitles

The Leopard Lady is a 1928 American silent horror film directed by Rupert Julian, written by Beulah Marie Dix, and starring Jacqueline Logan, Alan Hale and Robert Armstrong. The film, based on a play by Edward Childs Carpenter, is about a female animal trainer named Paula who goes undercover at a circus that has been beset by a number of unexplained horrific murders. A gorilla trained to kill people turns out to be the culprit, the simian being played by Charles Gemora (who made a career of playing apes in horror films, including 1932's Murders in the Rue Morgue). The cast boasted several name stars who went on to long acting careers, including Alan Hale, Robert Armstrong, and Richard Alexander (who appeared in numerous B-Westerns and serials). Rupert Julian directed this film late in his fading career, following it up with his final picture The Cat Creeps (1930), another lost film.

== Cast ==
- Jacqueline Logan as Paula
- Alan Hale as Caesar
- Robert Armstrong as Chris
- Hedwiga Reicher as Fran Holweg
- James Bradbury Sr. as Herman Berlitz
- Richard Alexander as Hector - Lion Tamer
- William P. Burt as Presner
- Sylvia Ashton as Mama Lolita
- Kay Deslys as Austrian Maid
- Willie Mae Carson as Austrian Maid

== Bibliography ==
- Munden, Kenneth White. The American Film Institute Catalog of Motion Pictures Produced in the United States, Part 1. University of California Press, 1997.
