= Erwin Kalser =

German actor (1883–1958)

- Born: Erwin Kalischer; February 22, 1883; Berlin, German Empire
- Died: March 26, 1958 (aged 75); Berlin, West Germany
- Occupation: Actor
- Years active: 1920-1957
- Spouse: Irma von Cube (?-1958 (his death)

Erwin Kalser (22 February 1883 – 26 March 1958) was a German-Jewish stage and film actor, best remembered as the Geneva Convention inspector in Stalag 17. He did most of his work in American made films.

== Biography ==
The son of a physicist, Erwin Kalser was born Erwin Kalischer in Berlin. He graduated from the University of Berlin with a Ph. D. in literature.

Kalser launched his career in Munich shortly after the beginning of the century. In 1933, he moved to Switzerland to work in the theatre. He first went to the United States in 1937 and returned in 1940 where he became a citizen. He appeared on Broadway in Androcles and the Lion.

He married film writer, Irmgard von Cube, and is the father of Oscar-winning producer Konstantin Kalser. He died of a heart attack in Berlin on March 26, 1958, aged 75.

== Partial filmography ==
- George Bully (1920)
- Oberst Rokschanin (1922)
- Die Talfahrt des Severin Hoyey (1922)
- I.N.R.I. (1923) - Der Mann in der Zelle
- Rasputins Liebesabenteuer (1928) - Zar
- Anastasia, die falsche Zarentochter (1928)
- Napoleon at St. Helena (1929) - Dr. O'Meara
- The Last Company (1930) - The miller
- The Shot in the Sound Film Studio (1930) - Regisseur
- Dreyfus (1930) - Mathieu Dreyfus (his brother)
- A Student's Song of Heidelberg (1930) - Dr. Zinker
- Der Herzog von Reichstadt (1931) - Kanzler Fürst Metternich
- Unheimliche Geschichten (1932) - Redner in der Irrenanstalt
- Eine von uns (1932)
- The First Right of the Child (1932)
- The White Demon (1932)
- What Men Know (1933) - Herr Barthel
- Rund um eine Million (1933)
- Fusilier Wipf (1938) - Herr Godax
- Escape to Glory (1940) - Dr. Adolph Behrens
- Escape (1940) - Hotel Barkeeper (uncredited)
- The Devil Commands (1941) - Professor Kent (uncredited)
- They Dare Not Love (1941) - Klaus (uncredited)
- Underground (1941) - Dr. Franken
- Dressed to Kill (1941) - Carlo Ralph, alias Otto Kuhn
- Kings Row (1942) - Mr. Sandor
- Berlin Correspondent (1942) - Mr. Hauen
- Mission to Moscow (1943) - German Businessman (uncredited)
- Watch on the Rhine (1943) - Dr. Klauber
- The Purple Heart (1944) - Karl Schleswig (uncredited)
- Address Unknown (1944) - Stage Director
- Once Upon a Time (1944) - Scientist #3 (uncredited)
- U-Boat Prisoner (1944) - Prof. Biencawicz (uncredited)
- Strange Affair (1944) - Dr. Brenner
- They Live in Fear (1944) - Jan Dorchik
- Heavenly Days (1944) - Drummer Boy (uncredited)
- Hotel Berlin (1945) - Dr. Dorf (uncredited)
- Two Smart People (1946) - Franz (uncredited)
- After the Storm (1948) - von Tretini
- The Girl in White (1952) - Dr. Schneider
- The Congregation (1952)
- Stalag 17 (1953) - Geneva Man
- The Plot to Assassinate Hitler (1955) - Dr. med. Adler
- Stresemann (1957) - Raymond Poincaré

== Bibliography ==
- Britton, Wesley. Onscreen And Undercover: The Ultimate Book of Movie Espionage. Greenwood Publishing Group, 2006.
