= Panic in the House of Ardon =

1920 film directed by Robert Wiene

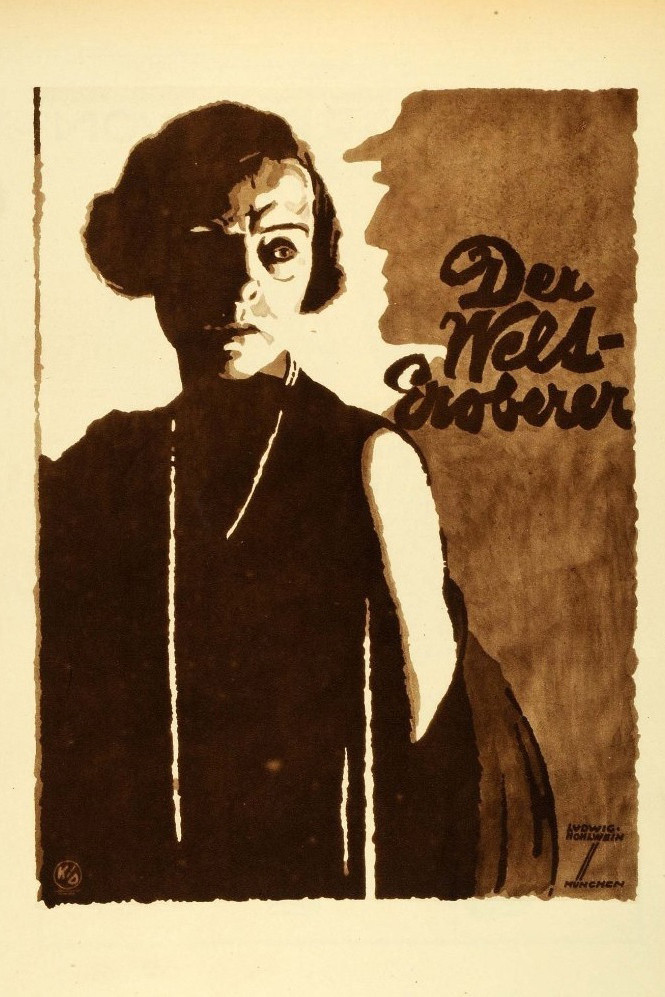
- Directed by: Robert Wiene
- Written by: Robert Wiene
- Produced by: Ernst Reicher
- Starring: Stella Harf; Max Kronert; Paul Mederow; Georg H. Schnell
- Production company: [Stuart Webbs-Film Company
- Release date: 1920
- Country: Germany
- Languages: Silent; German intertitles

Panic in the House of Ardon (German: Der Schrecken im Hause Ardon) is a 1920 German silent crime film directed by Robert Wiene and starring Stella Harf, Max Kronert and Paul Mederow. The film was finished by August 1920, but did not have its premiere until July 1921. It also had several alternative titles including Die Welteroberer (The World Conquerors). A crime syndicate attempts to discover the scientific secrets of the chemical company Ardon. The film was made in the Expressionist style that had been used for Wiene's earlier hit The Cabinet of Dr. Caligari. It features the popular detective Stuart Webbs, closely modeled on Sherlock Holmes.

== Cast ==
In alphabetical order

- Stella Harf
- Max Kronert
- Paul Mederow
- Georg H. Schnell
- Ernst Stahl-Nachbaur
- Kurt von Wangenheim

== Bibliography ==
- Jung, Uli & Schatzberg, Walter. Beyond Caligari: The Films of Robert Wiene. Berghahn Books, 1999.
