= Hedwiga Reicher =

German actress (1884–1971)

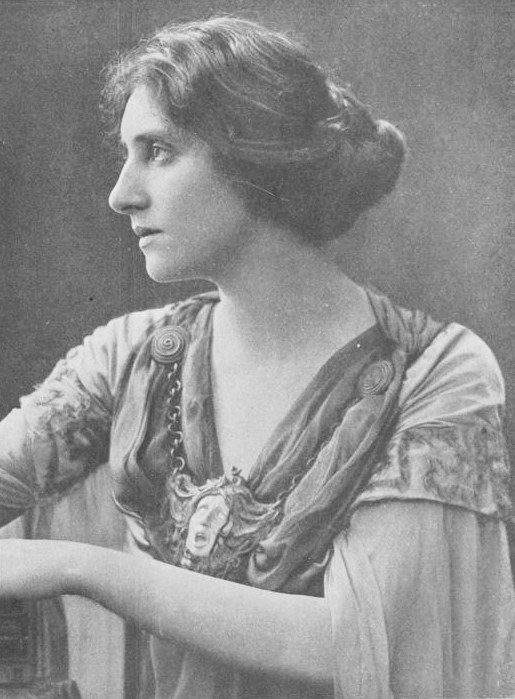
- Reicher in 1908
- Born: Hedwig Reicher; 12 June 1884; Oldenburg, Germany
- Died: 2 September 1971 (aged 87); Los Angeles, California, U.S.
- Other names: Hedwig Reicher; Celia Sibelius
- Occupations: Opera singer, actress
- Notable work: Confessions of a Nazi Spy (1939)
- Children: 1
- Parent: Emanuel Reicher
- Relatives: Frank Reicher (half-brother), Ernst Reicher (brother)

Hedwiga Reicher (Born Hedwig Reicher; 12 June 1884 – 2 September 1971) was a German actress. Her performances on Broadway were credited with the original spelling of her first name.

Reicher was named Hedwig, but she altered the spelling after she came to the United States because some people called her "Mr. Hedwig". She was the half-sister of actor Frank Reicher, sister of actor and screenwriter Ernst Reicher, and daughter of actor Emanuel Reicher. Another brother, Hans Reicher, was a sculptor, and her sister, Elly, was an actress.

Reicher's film debut came in The Rubaiyat of Omar Khayyam, produced by Ferdinand Earle.

In addition to acting, Reicher produced two plays with her father and in 1921 had a solo production of Monna Vanna at Los Angeles's Little Theater. She also acted in all three.

On 2 February 1934, Reicher married concert pianist and music teacher Maurice Zam in Hollywood, California.

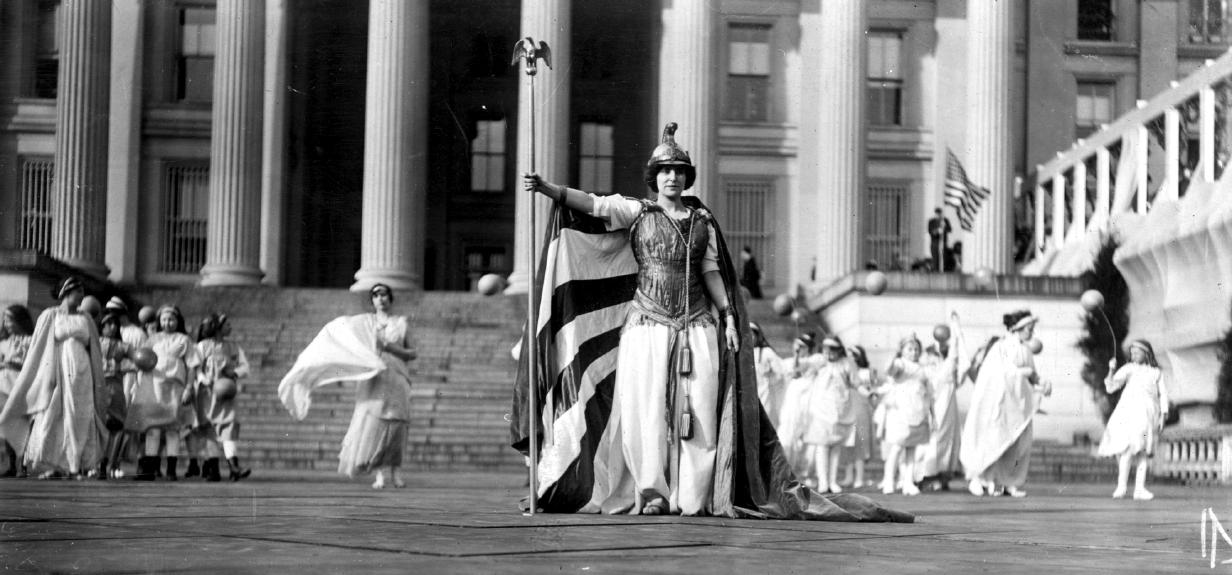
Hedwig Reicher at the Woman Suffrage Procession in front of the Treasury Building in Washington, D.C., on 3 March 1913.

== Selected filmography ==
- A Lover's Oath (1925) – Hassan's wife
- The King of Kings (1927) – (uncredited)
- The Leopard Lady (1928) – Fran Holweg
- True Heaven (1929) – Madame Grenot
- The Godless Girl (1929) – Prison Matron
- Lucky Star (1929) – Mrs. Tucker
- The Murder Trial of Mary Dugan (1931) – Mrs. Rice
- Beyond Victory (1931) – German Nurse (uncredited)
- Sporting Chance (1931) – Aunt Hetty
- The Dragon Murder Case (1934) – Mrs. Schwartz (uncredited)
- Rendezvous (1935) – De Segroff's Associate (uncredited)
- The House of a Thousand Candles (1936) – Maria
- I Married a Doctor (1936) – Bessie Valborg
- Dracula's Daughter (1936) – the innkeeper's wife (uncredited)
- It Could Happen to You (1937) – German Woman at Boardinghouse (uncredited)
- Confessions of a Nazi Spy (1939) – Lisa Kassel
- Dr. Ehrlich's Magic Bullet (1940) – Nurse (uncredited, Last appearance)

== Broadway roles ==
- On the Eve (1909), her Broadway debut
- The Next of Kin (1909)
- Henrik Ibsen's The Lady from the Sea (1911) – Ellida
- The Thunderbolt (1911)
- June Madness (1912) – Mrs. Thornborough
- The Stronger (1913)
- When the Young Vine Blooms (1915)
- Caliban of the Yellow Sands (1916) – Cleopatra

--Source: Internet Broadway Database

== Other ==
Reicher was hired to portray the mythological figure Columbia for the Woman Suffrage Procession, a suffrage parade on 3 March 1913, in Washington, D.C. According to news reports at the time, the group, which included 5000 to 8000 suffragists, marched from the US Capitol to the Treasury Building, and was watched by a crowd of 500,000 (mostly men). Their intent was to upstage Woodrow Wilson's inauguration, due to take place the following day.
