= August Kindermann =

German opera singer

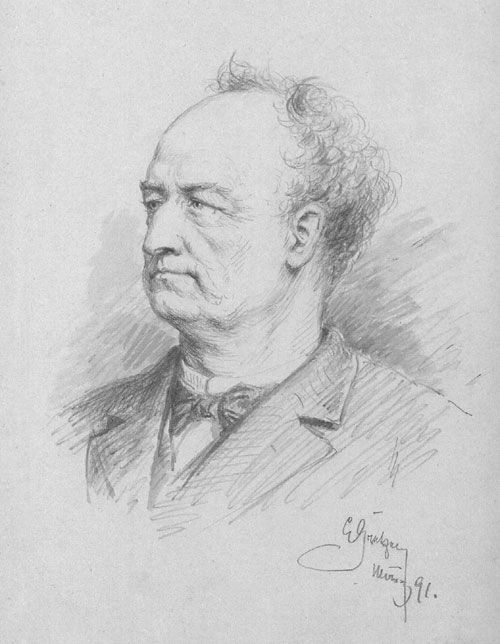
August Kinderman in an 1891 portrait by Eduard von Grützner.F

August Kindermann (6 February 1817 – 6 March 1891) was a German bass-baritone singer and regisseur, particularly noted for his performances in the operas of Richard Wagner.

He was born in Potsdam. He began his career singing in the chorus of the Berlin State Opera in 1836 and made his solo debut there in 1837 in a small role in Spontini's Agnes von Hohenstaufen. He went on to sing bass and baritone roles with Leipzig Opera from 1839 to 1846. While at Leipzig, he became a friend of Albert Lortzing and sang in the premieres of two of his operas: the title role in Hans Sachs (1840) and Count von Eberbach in Der Wildschütz (1842). He also sang Gazna in the premiere of Robert Schumann's secular oratorio Das Paradies und die Peri (1843). In 1846, Kinderman moved to the Bavarian State Opera in Munich where he was a Kammersänger and stage director who enjoyed great popularity. In 1855, he directed the company's production of Wagner's Tannhäuser as well as singing the role of Wolfram. During his time in Munich he sang the role of Wotan in the premieres of both Das Rheingold (1869) and Die Walküre (1870) as well as Titurel in the premiere of Parsifal (1882). In addition to the Wagner premieres, Kindermann also sang Count Eckart in the premiere of Josef Rheinberger's opera Die sieben Raben (1869).

August Kinderman's daughters, Franziska Kindermann, Hedwig Reicher-Kindermann, and Marie Kindermann also became opera singers. He died in Munich in 1891 at age 74.
