= The Ghost Hunt =

1918 film directed by Johannes Guter

- Directed by: Johannes Guter
- Written by: Richard Hutter
- Produced by: Ernst Reicher
- Starring: Ernst Reicher; Esther Carena; Aruth Wartan
- Production company: Stuart Webbs-Film
- Release date: April 1918
- Running time: 68 minutes
- Country: Germany
- Languages: Silent; German intertitles

The Ghost Hunt (German: Die Geisterjagd) is a 1918 German silent crime film directed by Johannes Guter and starring Ernst Reicher, Esther Carena and Aruth Wartan. It is part of a long-running series of films featuring the detective Stuart Webbs.

It was shot at the Weissensee Studios in Berlin.

== Cast ==
- Ernst Reicher as Stuart Webbs
- Esther Carena as Juanita
- Ernst Laskowski
- Frida Richard
- Lina Salten
- Aruth Wartan

== Bibliography ==
- Alfred Krautz. International directory of cinematographers, set- and costume designers in film, Volume 4. Saur, 1984.
