= The Diamond Foundation =

- Directed by: Johannes Guter
- Produced by: Ernst Reicher
- Starring: Ernst Reicher; Marija Leiko; Frida Richard
- Production company: Stuart Webbs-Film
- Release date: December 1917
- Running time: 64 minutes
- Country: Germany
- Languages: Silent; German intertitles

The Diamond Foundation (German: Die Diamantenstiftung) is a 1917 German silent crime film directed by Johannes Guter and starring Ernst Reicher, Marija Leiko and Frida Richard. It was one of a long series of films featuring the detective Stuart Webbs. It premiered at the Marmorhaus in December 1917.

The film's sets were designed by the future director Manfred Noa. It was shot at the Weissensee Studios in Berlin.

== Cast ==
- Ernst Reicher as Stuart Webbs
- Marija Leiko as Gräfin Witkowska
- Frida Richard
- Siegmund Aschenbach
- Erwin Botz
- Emil Helfer

== Bibliography ==
- Michael Hanisch. Auf den Spuren der Filmgeschichte: Berliner Schauplätze. Henschel, 1991.
