= I.N.R.I. (film) =

1923 film by Robert Wiene

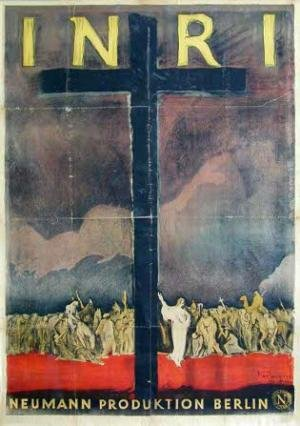
- Directed by: Robert Wiene
- Written by: Peter Rosegger (novel); Robert Wiene
- Produced by: Hans Neumann; Hans von Wolzogen
- Starring: Gregori Chmara; Henny Porten; Asta Nielsen; Werner Krauss
- Cinematography: Axel Graatkjær; Reimar Kuntze; Ludwig Lippert
- Music by: Willy Schmidt-Gentner
- Production company: Neumann-Filmproduktion
- Distributed by: Bayerische Film
- Release date: 25 December 1923
- Country: Germany
- Languages: Silent; German intertitles

I.N.R.I. is a 1923 German silent religious epic film directed by Robert Wiene and starring Gregori Chmara, Henny Porten, and Asta Nielsen. The film is a retelling of the events leading up to the crucifixion of Jesus Christ. It was based on a 1905 novel by Peter Rosegger. It was reissued in 1933 in the United States with an added music track and narration as Crown of Thorns.

The film uses a framing device set in modern Russia. The film is generally conventional in its treatment of the story except for the character of Judas Iscariot. Judas is portrayed as a social revolutionary who wants Jesus to become the leader of a Jewish uprising against the Roman army of occupation. Judas' eventual betrayal of Jesus is swayed by political disillusionment rather than money. The Judas role was very important to the film as it was conceived by Wiene, because it linked the biblical story to the framing story. However, the modern scenes provoked opposition from the censors, and the film was generally shown without them. It premiered in Berlin on Christmas Day 1923.

The film was shot over 90 days between May and September 1923 at the Staaken Studios in Berlin. It was made with a star cast, expensive sets and hundreds of extras. The film's art direction was by Ernő Metzner. In scale and length, it was the largest film directed by Wiene during his career. The film survives and is on YouTube, but has no official physical release.

== Cast ==
- Gregori Chmara as Jesus Christus
- Henny Porten as Maria
- Asta Nielsen as Maria Magdalena
- Werner Krauss as Pontius Pilatus
- Emanuel Reicher as High Priest Kaiphas
- Alexander Granach as Judas Ischariot
- Theodor Becker as the Roman commander
- Robert Taube as Priest Annas
- Bruno Ziener as Simon Petrus
- Hans Heinrich von Twardowski as John
- Emil Lind as Thomas
- Max Kronert as James the Great
- Herr Magnus as James the Less
- Walter Neumann as Matthew
- Guido Herzfeld as Simon
- Wilhelm Nagel as Philippus
- Lionel Royce as Bartholomew
- Eduard Kandl as Andrew
- Walter Werner as Lebdäus
- Paul Graetz as Jairus
- Maria Kryshanovskaya as Jairus's daughter
- Mathilde Sussin as the paralytic woman
- Erik Ode as young Jesus
- Erwin Kalser as the prisoner
- Elsa Wagner as the mother
- Erich Walter as the monk
- Ernst Dernburg as Judge
- Gustav Oberg as Prosecutor
- Jaro Fürth as Defense lawyer
- Pavel Pavlov as the jail guardian

== See also ==
- List of Easter films

== Bibliography ==
- Jung, Uli; Schatzberg, Walter (1999). Beyond Caligari: The Films of Robert Wiene. New York: Berghahn Books. ISBN 978-1-57181-156-1.
