= Die geheimnisvolle Villa =

1914 film directed by Joe May

- Directed by: Joe May
- Written by: Ernst Reicher
- Produced by: Continental-Kunstfilm
- Starring: Ernst Reicher
- Cinematography: Max Fassbender
- Release date: 13 March 1914
- Running time: 1322 metres
- Country: German Empire
- Languages: Silent; German intertitles

Die geheimnisvolle Villa (lit. 'The Secret-Filled Villa') is a 1914 silent German detective film directed by Joe May and starring Ernst Reicher. It is the first in the series starring the fictional gentleman detective Stuart Webbs, modelled on Sherlock Holmes. It also features Werner Krauss and May's wife Mia May and their daughter Eva May.

It was made at Continental-Kunstfilm's studios at 123 Chausseestraße, Berlin, and premièred at the Union-Theater Kammerlichtspiele cinema (later the Tauentzien Palast).

== Cast ==
- Ernst Reicher as Stuart Webbs
- Sabine Impekoven
- Julius Falkenstein
- Carl Auen
- Werner Krauss
- Max Landa
- Eva May
- Mia May
- Lupu Pick
- Fritz Richard
