= The Medium (1921 film) =

1921 film

- Directed by: Hermann Rosenfeld
- Written by: Max Jungk
- Produced by: Erich Pommer
- Starring: Lil Dagover
- Cinematography: Max Fassbender
- Production company: Berliner Film
- Distributed by: Decla-Bioscop
- Release date: 11 February 1921
- Country: Germany
- Languages: Silent; German intertitles

The Medium (German:Das Medium) is a 1921 German silent film directed by Hermann Rosenfeld and starring Lil Dagover.

The film's art direction was by Artur Günther.

== Cast ==
In alphabetical order

- Karl Armster
- Harry Berber
- Erra Bognar
- Lil Dagover
- Fred Goebel
- Bruno Harprecht
- Edgar Klitzsch
- Werner Krauss
- Frieda Lehndorf
- Frida Richard

== Bibliography ==
- Hans-Michael Bock and Tim Bergfelder. The Concise Cinegraph: An Encyclopedia of German Cinema. Berghahn Books.
