= Napoleon at Saint Helena =

1929 film directed by Lupu Pick

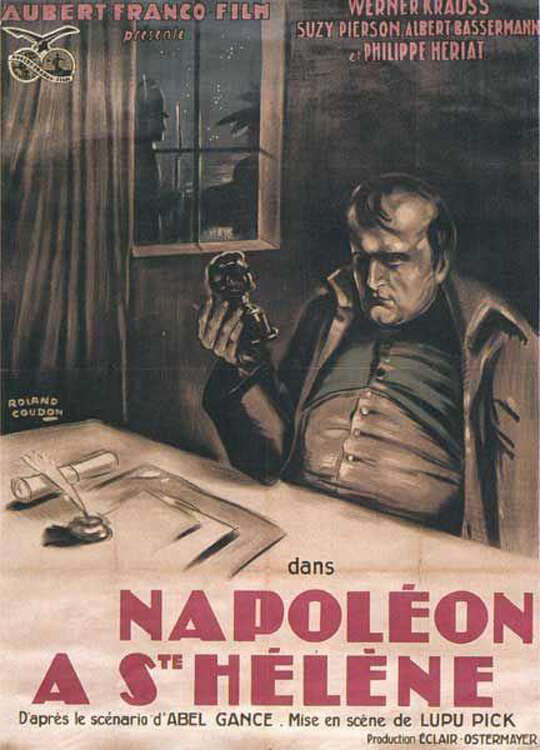
- French release poster
- Directed by: Lupu Pick
- Written by: Abel Gance; Willy Haas; Lupu Pick
- Produced by: Peter Ostermayr; Ottmar Ostermayr; Serge Sandberg; Lupu Pick
- Starring: Werner Krauss; Hanna Ralph; Albert Bassermann; Philippe Hériat
- Cinematography: Robert Baberske; Ludwig Lippert; Fritz Arno Wagner; Friedrich Weinmann
- Music by: Willy Schmidt-Gentner
- Production company: Peter Ostermayr Produktion
- Distributed by: Deutsche Lichtspiel-Syndikat
- Release date: 7 November 1929
- Running time: 100 minutes
- Country: Germany
- Languages: Silent; German intertitles

Napoleon at Saint Helena (German: Napoleon auf Sankt Helena) is a 1929 German silent historical film directed by Lupu Pick and starring Werner Krauss, Hanna Ralph, and Albert Bassermann. It was shot at the EFA Studios in Berlin with location shooting in Marseille and St. Helena. The film's sets were designed by the art directors Erich Zander and Karl Weber.

== Plot ==
The film depicts the final years of Napoleon between 1815 and 1821 during his period of exile on the British Atlantic island of Saint Helena following his defeat at Waterloo.

== Cast ==
- Werner Krauss as Napoleon
- Hanna Ralph as Madame Bertrand
- Albert Bassermann as Governor Hudson Lowe of St. Helena
- Philippe Hériat as General Bertrand
- Louis V. Arco as Count Montholon
- Suzy Pierson as Madame Montholon
- Hermann Thimig as General Gourgaud
- Paul Henckels as Baron Las Cases
- Georges Péclet as Marchand
- Theodor Loos as Capitain Pionkowski
- Erwin Kalser as Dr. O'Meara
- Hugh Douglas as Captain Maitland
- Fritz Odemar as Lieutenant Nichols
- Eduard von Winterstein as General Gebhard Leberecht von Blücher
- Albert Florath as Louis XVIII
- Fritz Staudte as Charles-Maurice de Talleyrand-Périgord
- Max Kaufmann as Archduke Franz Karl of Austria
- Camillo Kossuth as Klemens von Metternich
- Alfred Gerasch as Tsar Alexander I of Russia
- Philipp Manning as Lord Holland
- Günther Hadank as The Duke of Wellington
- Karl Etlinger as Buchhändler Simon
- Jaro Fürth as Dr. Arnott
- Ernst Rotmund as Commandant Reed
- Magnus Stifter as Admiral Cockburn
- Lilli Weiss as child
- Matti Prinz as child
- Martin Kosleck
- Hermann Böttcher
- Franz Schafheitlin
- Stella Harf
- John Mylong
- Arthur von Klein
- Petra Unkel

== Bibliography ==
- Prawer, Siegbert Salomon (2007) [2005]. Between Two Worlds: The Jewish Presence in German and Austrian Film, 1910–1933. New York: Berghahn Books. ISBN 978-1-84545-303-9.
