= The Green Monocle =

1929 film directed by Rudolf Meinert

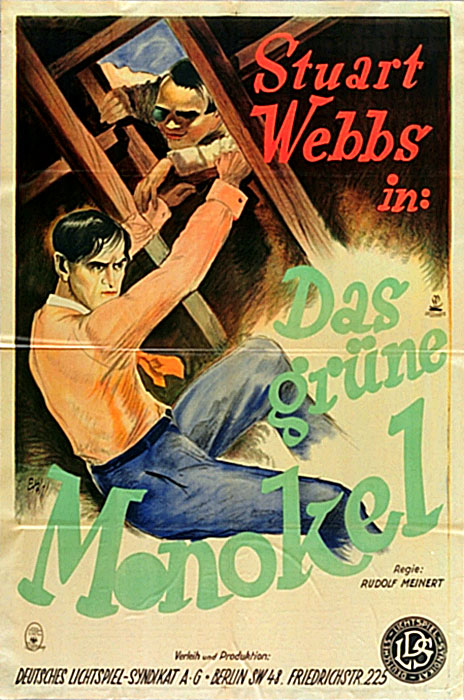
- Directed by: Rudolf Meinert
- Written by: Guido Kreutzer (novel); Curt J. Braun; Bobby E. Lüthge
- Produced by: Marcel Hellman
- Starring: Ralph Clancy; Betty Bird; Suzy Vernon; Gaston Modot
- Cinematography: Willy Goldberger; Curt Oertel
- Music by: Hansheinrich Dransmann
- Production company: Deutsche Lichtspiel-Syndikat
- Distributed by: Deutsche Lichtspiel-Syndikat
- Release date: 24 September 1929
- Running time: 80 minutes
- Country: Germany
- Languages: Silent; German intertitles

The Green Monocle (German: Das grüne Monokel) is a 1929 German silent crime film directed by Rudolf Meinert and starring Ralph Clancy, Betty Bird and Suzy Vernon. The film was based on a novel by Guido Kreutzer. It features the fictional detective Stuart Webbs, one of several German fictional characters inspired by Sherlock Holmes, who had appeared in a series of silent films during the 1910s and 1920s.

It was shot at the Tempelhof Studios in Berlin with location shooting in Berlin, Hamburg, Frankfurt am Main as well as Basel and Montreux in Switzerland. The film's sets were designed by the art directors Robert Neppach and Erwin Scharf

== Cast ==
- Ralph Clancy as Stuart Webbs
- Betty Bird as Christa Varell
- Suzy Vernon as Inez Rion
- Gaston Modot as McCornick
- Livio Pavanelli as Miller
- Paul Hörbiger as Snyder
- Alfred Döderlein as Hans von Traß
- Ferdinand Hart as Bruce
- Arnold Korff as Dr. Heinzius

== Bibliography ==
- Prawer, S.S. Between Two Worlds: The Jewish Presence in German and Austrian Film, 1910-1933. Berghahn Books, 2007.
