= Hedwig Reicher-Kindermann =

German opera singer (1853–1883)

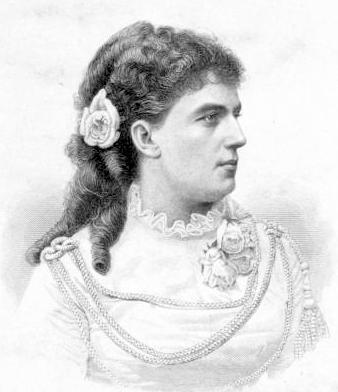
Hedwig Reicher-Kindermann by August Weger

Hedwig Reicher-Kindermann (1853–1883) was a German opera singer whose range covered both soprano and contralto. She trained as a pianist until she was 15 when her father recognized her singing abilities. In 1871, she was engaged by the Court Theatre in Munich where she performed as a singer, dancer and actress. After singing in Bayreuth in 1876, she made guest appearances in Austria, France and Italy. In 1880, she was engaged by the Leipzig Opera where she became known for her Wagnerian roles. From September 1882, she toured widely with Angelo Neumann's Niebelungentheater but died in Trieste, Italy, on 2 June shortly after appearing as Brünnhilde in Wagner's Götterdämmerung.

== Biography ==
Born in Munich on 15 July 1853, Hedwig Kindermann was the fifth daughter of the baritone August Kindermann and his wife Magdalena née Hofmann. Her mother, a teacher at the Leipzig Conservatory taught her piano from the age of five while she was also trained in voice by her father. When she was 15, she entered the Munich Music School as a pianist but also took part in the choir under Franz Wüllner.

In 1871, she made her debut at the Court Theatre in Karlsruhe and went on to appear in the Court Opera of Munich as the Countess in Albert Lortzing's Der Wildschütz, continuing to perform there until 1877. She took part in the first presentation of Wagner's full Ring Cycle at Bayreuth from 13 to 17 August 1876, performing the role of Erda. While performing at the Hamburg Opera (1877–78), she appeared in the role of Grimerde in Die Walküre. Over the next two years, she continued her success in Vienna (in Italian operas), Berlin and Wiesbaden.

In 1880, she was engaged by the Leipzig Opera where she became known for her Wagnerian roles. From September 1882, she toured widely with Angelo Neumann's Niebelungentheater, singing Wagnerian roles in Germany, Belgium and London where the Ring was presented for the first time at Her Majesty's Theatre. While touring in Italy, she died in Trieste on 2 June 1883 shortly after appearing as Brünnhilde in Götterdämmerung.
