= Max Fassbender =

German cinematographer

Max Fassbender (8 October 1868, in Berlin – 20 February 1934) was a German cinematographer. He is known for his work with directors Fritz Lang and Richard Oswald.

== Selected filmography ==
- 1913: Fabrik-Marianne
- 1913: Das verschleierte Bild von Groß-Kleindorf
- 1913: Die geheimnisvolle Villa
- The Man in the Cellar (1914)
- 1914: Der Spuk im Hause des Professors
- The Armoured Vault (1914)
- 1915: Der gestreifte Domino
- 1915: Die Toten erwachen
- 1916: Seine letzte Maske
- 1916: Seltsame Köpfe
- The Uncanny House (1916, 3 parts)
- 1916: Titanenkampf
- 1916: A Night of Horror
- 1916: Die Rache der Toten
- 1916–18: Let There Be Light
- 1917: Königliche Bettler
- 1917: Das Bildnis des Dorian Gray
- 1917: Die zweite Frau
- 1917: Der Weg ins Freie
- 1917: Das Kainszeichen
- 1917: Des Goldes Fluch
- 1917: Rennfieber
- 1918: The House of Three Girls
- 1918: Colomba
- 1918: Der lebende Leichnam
- 1918: Diary of a Lost Woman
- 1918: Jettchen Gebert
- 1918: The Story of Dida Ibsen
- 1918: Peer Gynt
- 1918: Midnight
- 1918: Europe, General Delivery
- 1918: Die Reise um die Erde in 80 Tagen
- 1918/1919: Anders als die Andern
- 1919: Prostitution
- 1919: Harakiri
- 1919: Der rote Sarafan
- 1920: Halbe Unschuld
- 1920: Der Sprung ins Dunkle
- 1920: George Bully
- 1920: Die Nacht der Toten
- 1920: Schatten aus dem Totenreich
- 1920: Das Medium
- 1921: Verlorene Seelen
- 1921: Das Rattenloch
- 1921: Frauenbeichte, 2 Teile
- 1922: Marie Antoinette
- 1922/23: Nachtstürme
- 1924: Die Entstehung der Eidgenossenschaft
- 1925/26: Cyganka aza
- 1926: Das graue Haus
- 1927: Die raffinierteste Frau Berlins
