= Stuart Webbs =

Fictional character in German films of the silent era

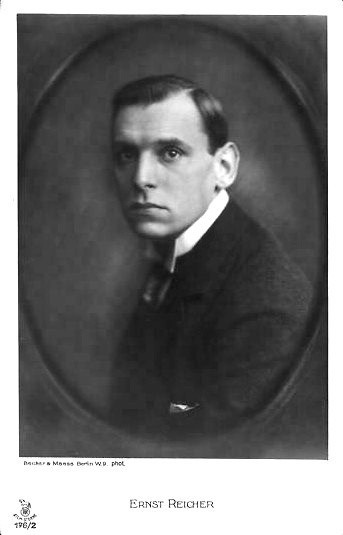
Ernst Reicher, c. 1918

Stuart Webbs is a fictional detective who appeared in a series of German films and serials during the silent era. Webbs was one of a number of detectives with English-sounding names to appear in German cinema of the era. Like his contemporaries, such as Joe Deebs, he was modelled on Sherlock Holmes. Webbs was the most popular of the group. His original film series ran from 1914 to 1926, and he continued to appear in other later films such as The Green Monocle (1929).

Webbs was played by Ernst Reicher until 1926. A number of figures directed entries in the series including Joe May, Johannes Guter and Robert Wiene. The series was originally made by Continental-Kunstfilm, but following a dispute May and Reicher left to form their own production company, Stuart Webbs-Film.

== History ==
The role of Stuart Webbs was played by Ernst Reicher, and once each by Fritz Greiner, Ralph Clancy, and Karl Ludwig Diehl. Joe May directed the films, but directors Adolf Gärtner, Johannes Guter, Max Obal, Robert Wiene, Franz Seitz Sr., Lupu Pick, Rudolf Meinert, and Ernst Reicher himself also contributed. The directors of some films are unknown.

Stuart Webbs was a gentleman detective modelled after Sherlock Holmes, who solved even the most difficult cases with intelligence and elegance. Throughout the First World War, this fictional character was popular with German cinema audiences. Webbs's adventures were filmed regularly until 1921; after that, the individual episodes of the series, now produced by Emelka, also based in Munich, were produced at irregular intervals. In 1926, a remake of The Armoured Vault (German: Das Panzergewölbe), again with Reicher in the title role, was produced; it was his last appearance as the suave detective. Two late additions to the series were the silent films The Green Monocle (German: Das grüne Monokel) with Ralph Clancy and Masks (German: Masken) with Karl Ludwig Diehl, both in 1929.

In 1935, film historian Oskar Kalbus described the origins of the series:

In 1913, director Joe May made a film featuring a number of up-and-coming actors. One of them was Ernst Reicher. Reicher, who had studied the Whitechapel crime district in England and met a detective there whose sharp intellect he constantly admired, suggested one day that an adventure of this private detective should be filmed. He named the film's hero Stuart Webbs, and thus the first detective film, The Mysterious Villa, was born. What no one expected was that this film was the biggest box office success imaginable. Everywhere it was released, at home and abroad, audiences lined up at the cinema box office. It wasn't long before the second Stuart Webbs film was made, then the third, the fourth, the twentieth. Ernst Reicher probably made 40–50 films in which he played "Stuart Webbs", that amiable, chivalrous, highly intellectual, athletic detective who saw his noblest duty as the tireless service of justice.

== List of episodes ==
Exact counts vary due to lost or incomplete records. Many entries are now considered lost.

Year	Series number (Note: The series numbers are taken from the source. The numbering is unclear.)	German title (English title)	Director	Leading actor
1914	I.	Die geheimnisvolle Villa (The Secret-Filled Villa)	Joe May	Ernst Reicher
1914	II.	Der Mann im Keller (The Man in the Cellar)	Joe May	Ernst Reicher
1914	III.	Der Spuk im Hause des Professors (The Haunting in the Professor's House)	Joe May	Ernst Reicher
1914	—	Das Panzergewölbe (The Armoured Vault)	Joe May	Ernst Reicher
1915	V.	Der gestreifte Domino (The Striped Domino )	Adolf Gärtner	Ernst Reicher
1915	VI.	Die Toten erwachen (The Dead Awaken)	Adolf Gärtner	Ernst Reicher
1915	—	Eines Mannes Schatten (A Man's Shadow )	Ernst Reicher	Ernst Reicher
1915	VII.	Das Mitternachtsschiff (The Midnight Ship )	Adolf Gärtner	Ernst Reicher
1916	VIII.	Der Brieföffner (The Letter Opener)	Adolf Gärtner	Ernst Reicher
1916	IX.	Der Amateur (The Amateur)	Ernst Reicher	Ernst Reicher
1916	X./XI.	Der Hilferuf (The Cry for Help )	Adolf Gärtner	Ernst Reicher
1917	XI.	Stuart Webbs: Die Reise ins Jenseits (Stuart Webbs: The Journey to the Afterlife )	Adolf Gärtner	Ernst Reicher
1916	XIII.	Gräfin de Castro (Countess de Castro )	Adolf Gärtner	Ernst Reicher
1916	XIII.	Die Peitsche (The Whip)	Adolf Gärtner	Ernst Reicher
1917	XIV.	Die Senatorwahl (The Senate Election )	unbekannt	Ernst Reicher
1917	XV.	Das Lichtsignal (The Light Signal)	unbekannt	Ernst Reicher
1917	XVI.	Die Pagode (The Pagoda)	Ernst Reicher	Ernst Reicher
1917	XVII.	Das treibende Floß (The Floating Raft)	unbekannt	Ernst Reicher
1917	XVIII.	Der Todesstern (The Death Star)	unbekannt	Ernst Reicher
1917	XIX.	Die Diamantenstiftung (The Diamond Foundation)	Johannes Guter	Ernst Reicher
1918	XX.	Der rätselhafte Blick (The Enigmatic Gaze)	Johannes Guter	Ernst Reicher
1918	XXI.	Die Geisterjagd (The Ghost Hunt)	Johannes Guter	Ernst Reicher
1918	XXII.	Der Eisenbahnmarder (The Railway Marten )	Johannes Guter	Ernst Reicher
1918	XXV./XXIII.	Der Teufelswalzer (The Devil's Waltz)	Johannes Guter	Ernst Reicher
1918	XXIV.	Der Stier von Saldanha (The Bull of Saldanha )	Johannes Guter	Ernst Reicher
1918	XXV.	Der Stellvertreter] (The Deputy )	unbekannt	Ernst Reicher
1918	—	Die geheimnisvollen Briefe (The Mysterious Letters )	unbekannt	Ernst Reicher
1918	—	Das gestohlene Modell (The Stolen Model)	Max Obal	Ernst Reicher
1919	XXVI.	Die Launen des Glücks (The Whims of Luck )	Ernst Reicher	Ernst Reicher
1919	—	Die Brüder von Sankt Parasitus (The Brothers of Saint Parasitus )	Max Obal	Ernst Reicher
1919	—	Das Schloß am Abhang (The Castle on the Hillside )	unbekannt	Ernst Reicher
1920	—	Die graue Elster (The Gray Magpie)	unbekannt	Ernst Reicher
1920	—	Der Schrecken im Hause Ardon (Panic in the House of Ardon)	Robert Wiene	Fritz Greiner
1920	—	Der Sprung ins Dunkle (The Leap in the Dark)	Ernst Reicher	Ernst Reicher
1920	—	George Bully und Stuart Webbs (George Bully and Stuart Webbs)	Max Obal	Ernst Reicher
1921	—	Das Rattenloch (The Rat Hole)	Max Obal	Ernst Reicher
1921	—	Camera Obscura	Max Obal	Ernst Reicher
1921	—	Erlebnisse Stuart Webbs: Der Meisterdetektiv in seinen Abenteuern (The Adventures of Stuart Webb: The Master Detective )	—	Ernst Reicher
1923	—	Im letzten Augenblick (At the Last Moment)	Ernst Reicher	Ernst Reicher
1924	—	Die Perlen des Dr. Talmadge (The Pearls of Doctor Talmadge)	Max Obal	Ernst Reicher
1924	—	Die malayische Dschonke (The Malay Junk)	Max Obal	Ernst Reicher
1925	—	Das Geheimnis auf Schloß Elmshöh (The Secret at Elmshöh Castle )	Max Obal	Ernst Reicher
1925	—	Das Parfüm der Mrs. Worrington (Mrs Worrington's Perfume)	Franz Seitz sr.	Ernst Reicher
1925	—	Der Schuß im Pavillon (The Shot in the Pavilion)	Max Obal	Ernst Reicher
1925	—	Das Geheimnis einer Stunde (The Secret of an Hour )	Max Obal	Ernst Reicher
1926	—	Das Panzergewölbe (The Armoured Vault)	Lupu Pick	Ernst Reicher
1929	—	Das grüne Monokel (The Green Monocle)	Rudolf Meinert	Ralph Clancy
1930	—	Masken (Masks)	Rudolf Meinert	Karl Ludwig Diehl

== Gallery of film posters ==
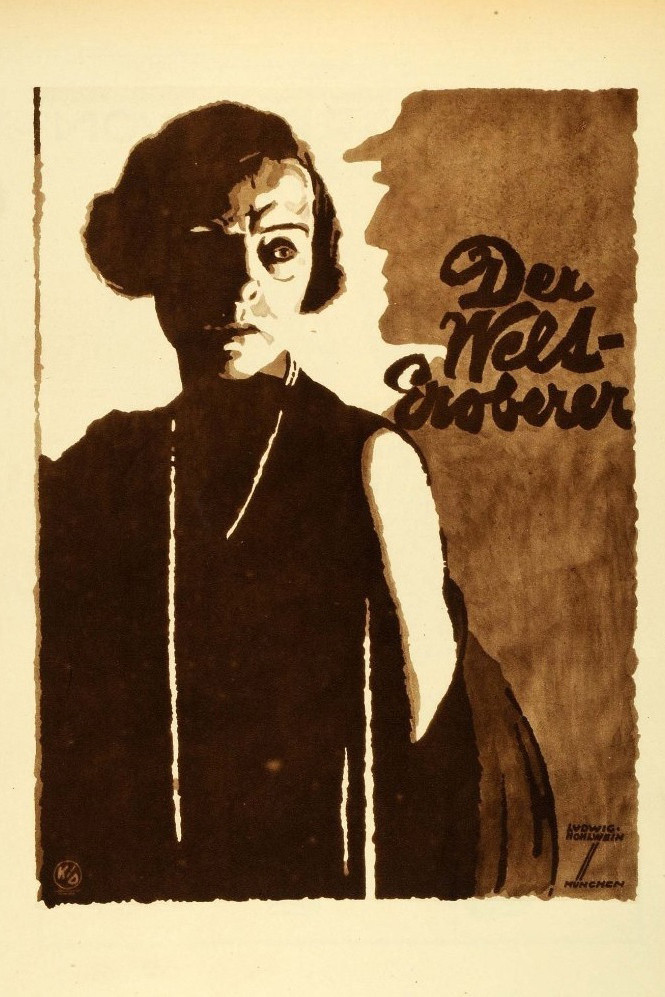
Panic in the House of Ardon (1920)

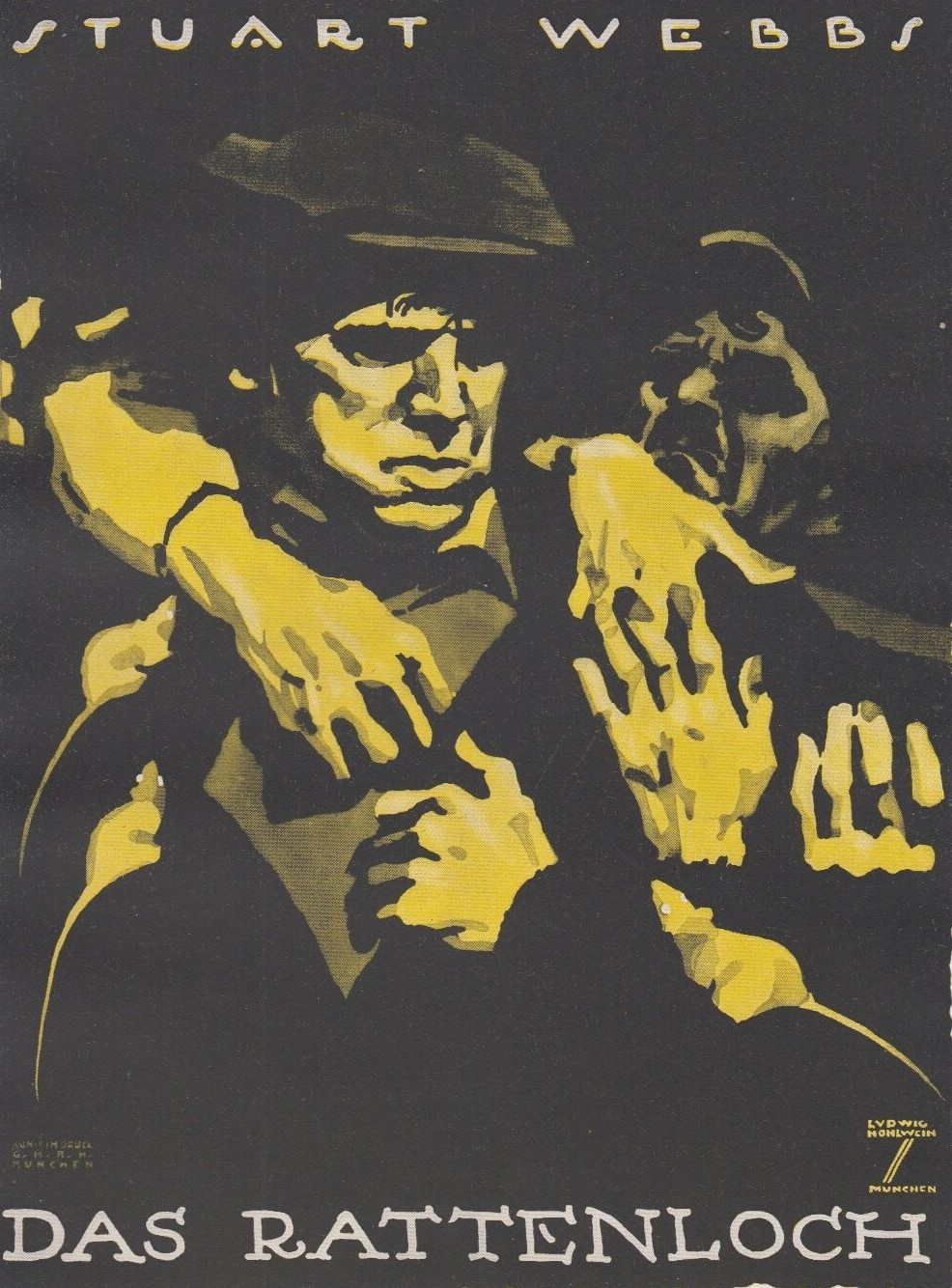
The Rat Hole (1921)

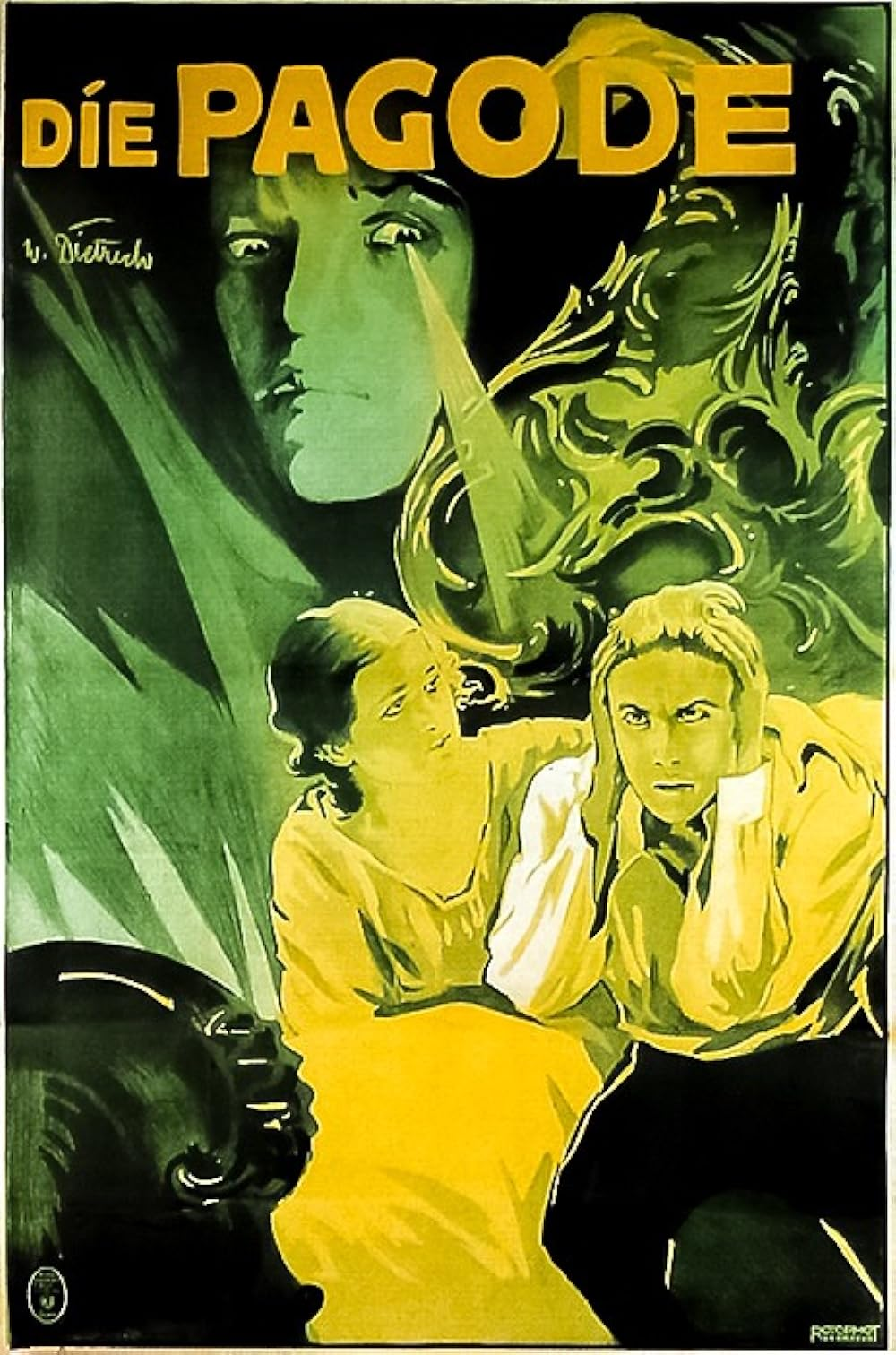
The Pagoda (1923)

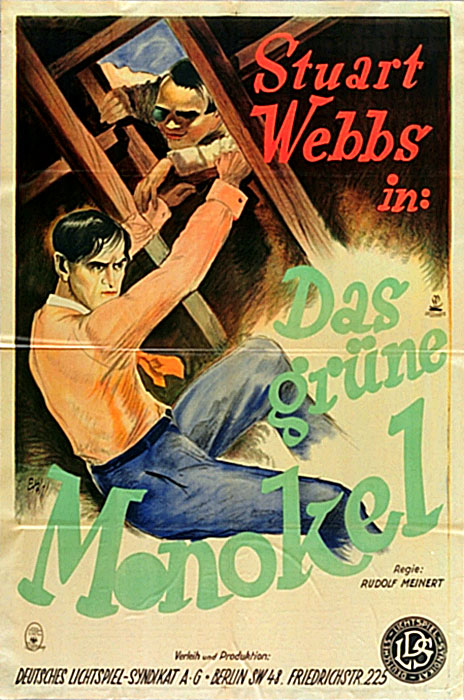
The Green Monocle (1929)

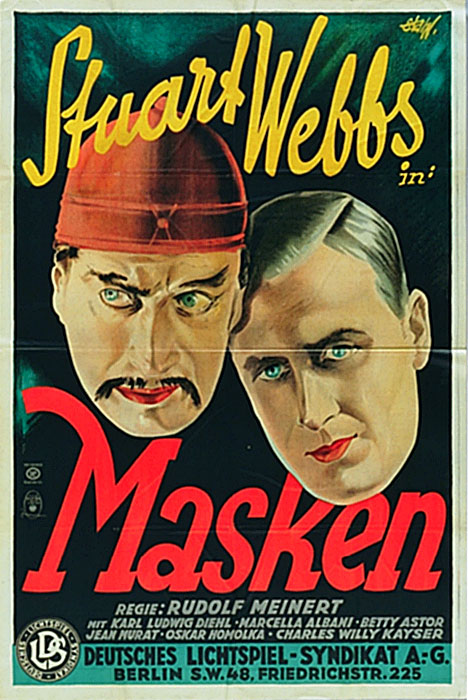
Masks (1929)
