= Ernst Reicher =

German actor

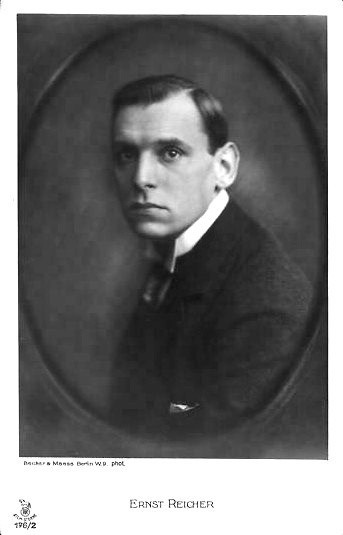
- Born: 19 September 1885; Berlin, German Empire
- Died: 1 May 1936 (aged 50); Prague, Czechoslovakia
- Occupations: Actor; film director; film producer; screenwriter
- Years active: 1912–1932
- Spouse: Stella Harf (divorced)
- Parent: Emanuel Reicher (father)
- Relatives: Hedwiga Reicher (sister); Frank Reicher (half-brother)

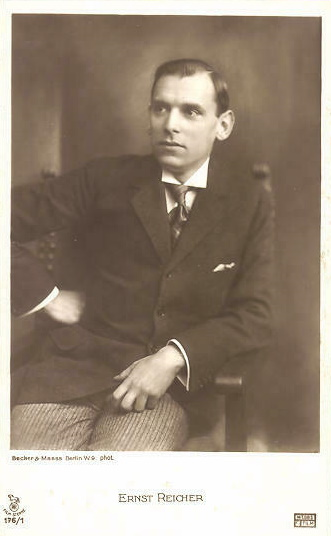
Reicher, c.1918

Ernst Reicher (19 September 1885 – 1 May 1936) was a German-Jewish actor, screenwriter, film producer and film director of the silent era.

== Biography ==
His father was the actor Emanuel Reicher, born in Galicia, then part of the Kingdom of Austria. Emanuel married firstly the opera singer Hedwig Reicher-Kindermann (15 July 1853 – 2 June 1883): their son was the actor Frank Reicher. After Hedwig's death, he married the actress Lina Harf and the couple had three children: Hedwiga Reicher, Ernst, and Elly (b. Berlin 1893), who all worked as actors.

At Continental-Kunstfilm's studios Ernst Reicher acted, wrote scripts and directed films from 1912 to 1918. In December 1912 he starred in Vorglühen des Balkanbrandes, directed by Joe May. He wrote, directed and starred in two films: Das Werk in February 1913, and Die Statue in 1914, which was banned by the Berlin police censor until 1919.

Starting in winter 1913/14, he wrote and starred in the first three of the 'Stuart Webbs' detective films, a popular detective series directed by Joe May for Continental in which he played a gentleman detective modelled on Sherlock Holmes: Die geheimnisvolle Villa; Der Mann im Keller; and Der Spuk im Haus des Professors. When World War I broke out, Joe May split with up Reicher to make his own Joe Deebs detective motion pictures.

For more than a decade after 1914, Reicher continued to write and star as Stuart Webbs, and was closely identified with the part. It was not until 1918 that Reicher turned to other topics. On the first of April 1919, he moved the headquarters of his film company to Munich. His most elaborate production was The Book of Esther (1919) in which he also starred. At the beginning of the twenties he suffered a serious car accident, in which he suffered a vertebral and fractured skull. Only from 1926 he appeared again on the screen, but he could no longer build on previous successes.

After the seizure of power in 1933 by the National Socialists, Reicher emigrated to Prague, where he fell into obscurity. His last, tiny role in the 1936 French-language remake of The Golem was cut out of the final version. Later that year, he committed suicide by hanging in a Prague hotel room, "in a small, narrow room, in a street that was far from the stage of fame."

== Selected filmography ==
- The Man in the Cellar (1914)
- The Armoured Vault (1914)
- Die geheimnisvolle Villa (1914)
- The Diamond Foundation (1917)
- The Ghost Hunt (1918)
- Panic in the House of Ardon (1920)
- The Grey Magpie (1920)
- Camera Obscura (1921)
- The Wonderful Adventure (1924)
- Mrs Worrington's Perfume (1925)
- The Shot in the Pavilion (1925)
- The Armoured Vault (1926)
- Number 17 (1928)
- Hands Up, Eddy Polo (1928)
- Road to Rio (1931)
- The Song of the Nations (1931)
- The Theft of the Mona Lisa (1931)
- A Night at the Grand Hotel (1931)
- Rasputin, Demon with Women (1932)
