= The Last of Mrs. Cheyney =

The Last of Mrs. Cheyney may refer to:

- The Last of Mrs. Cheyney (play), a 1925 play by Frederick Lonsdale
- The Last of Mrs. Cheyney (1929 film), a 1929 adaptation starring Norma Shearer and Basil Rathbone
- The Last of Mrs. Cheyney (1937 film), a 1937 adaptation starring Joan Crawford and William Powell
- The Last of Mrs. Cheyney (1961 film), a 1961 adaptation starring Lilli Palmer

== See also ==
- The Law and the Lady (1951 film), an adaptation starring Greer Garson
