= Private Lives =

1930 play by Noël Coward

- Poster from the 1968 Theatre De Lys production featuring a sketch of Coward
- Original language: English
- Written by: Noël Coward
- Subject: A divorced couple unexpectedly honeymoon at the same place with their new spouses
- Genre: Romantic comedy
- Setting: A hotel in Deauville, France, and a flat in Paris in the 1930s

Premiere
- Date: 18 August 1930; 96 years ago
- Place: King's Theatre, Edinburgh

Private Lives is a 1930 comedy of manners in three acts by the English playwright Noël Coward. It concerns a divorced couple who, while honeymooning with their new spouses, discover that they are staying in adjacent rooms at the same hotel. Despite a perpetually stormy relationship, they realise that they still have feelings for each other. Its second-act love scene was nearly censored in Britain as too risqué. Coward wrote one of his most popular songs, "Someday I'll Find You", for the play.

After touring the British provinces, the play opened the new Phoenix Theatre in London in 1930, starring Coward, Gertrude Lawrence, Adrianne Allen and Laurence Olivier. A Broadway production followed in 1931, and the play has been revived at least a half-dozen times each in the West End and on Broadway. The leading roles have attracted a wide range of actors: among those who have succeeded Coward as Elyot are Robert Stephens, Richard Burton, Alan Rickman and Matthew Macfadyen, and successors to Lawrence as Amanda have included Tallulah Bankhead, Elizabeth Taylor, Joan Collins, Elaine Stritch, Maggie Smith, Penelope Keith and Lindsay Duncan. Directors of new productions have included John Gielgud, Howard Davies and Richard Eyre. The play was made into a 1931 film and has been adapted several times for television and radio.

== Background ==
Coward was in the middle of an extensive Asian tour when he contracted influenza in Shanghai. He spent the better part of his two-week convalescence sketching out the play and then completed the actual writing of the piece in only four days. He immediately cabled Gertrude Lawrence in New York to ask her to keep autumn 1930 free to appear in the play. After spending a few more weeks revising it, he typed the final draft in The Cathay Hotel in Shanghai and sent copies to Lawrence and his producer and manager, John C. Wilson, with instructions to cable him with their reactions.

Coward received no fewer than 30 telegrams from Lawrence about the play. She first said that she had read the play and there was "nothing wrong with it that can't be fixed." Coward "wired back curtly that the only thing that was going to be fixed was her performance." Lawrence was indecisive about what to do about her previous commitment to André Charlot. Coward finally responded that he planned to cast the play with another actress. By the time he returned to London, he found Lawrence not only had cleared her schedule but was staying at Edward Molyneux's villa in Cap-d'Ail in southeastern France learning her lines. Coward joined her, and the two began rehearsing the scenes they shared.

At the end of July they returned to London where Coward began to direct the production. Coward played the part of Elyot Chase himself, Adrianne Allen was his bride Sibyl, Lawrence played Amanda Prynne, and Laurence Olivier was her new husband Victor. Coward wrote Sibyl and Victor as minor characters, "extra puppets, lightly wooden ninepins, only to be repeatedly knocked down and stood up again." He later insisted, however, that they must be credible new spouses for the lead characters: "We've got to have two people as attractive as Larry and Adrianne were in the first place, if we can find them."

Rehearsals were still under way when the Lord Chamberlain took exception to the second act's love scene, labelling it too risqué in light of the fact the characters were divorced and married to others. Coward went to St. James's Palace to plead his case by acting out the play himself and assuring the censor that with artful direction the scene would be presented in a dignified and unobjectionable manner. Coward repeats one of his signature theatrical devices at the end of the play, where the main characters tiptoe out as the curtain falls – a device that he also used in Present Laughter, Hay Fever and Blithe Spirit.

The play contains one of Coward's most popular songs, "Some Day I'll Find You" (sometimes printed as "Someday I'll Find You"). The Noël Coward Society's website, drawing on performing statistics from the publishers and the Performing Rights Society, ranks it among Coward's ten most performed songs.

== Synopsis ==
Act 1

Following a brief courtship, Elyot and Sibyl are honeymooning at a hotel in Deauville, France, (Note: Coward's opening directions in the text specify merely "a hotel in France", but in Act III (p. 87) Sibyl makes it clear that the hotel is in Deauville.) although her curiosity about his first marriage is not helping his romantic mood. In the adjoining suite Amanda and Victor are starting their new life together, although he cannot stop thinking of the cruelty Amanda's ex-husband displayed towards her. Elyot and Amanda, following a volatile three-year-long marriage, have been divorced for five years, but they now discover that they are sharing a terrace while on their honeymoons with their new and younger spouses. Elyot and Amanda separately beg their new spouses to leave the hotel with them immediately, but both new spouses refuse to cooperate and each storms off to dine alone. Realising they still love each other and regretting having divorced, Elyot and Amanda abandon their spouses and run off to Amanda's flat in Paris.

Act 2

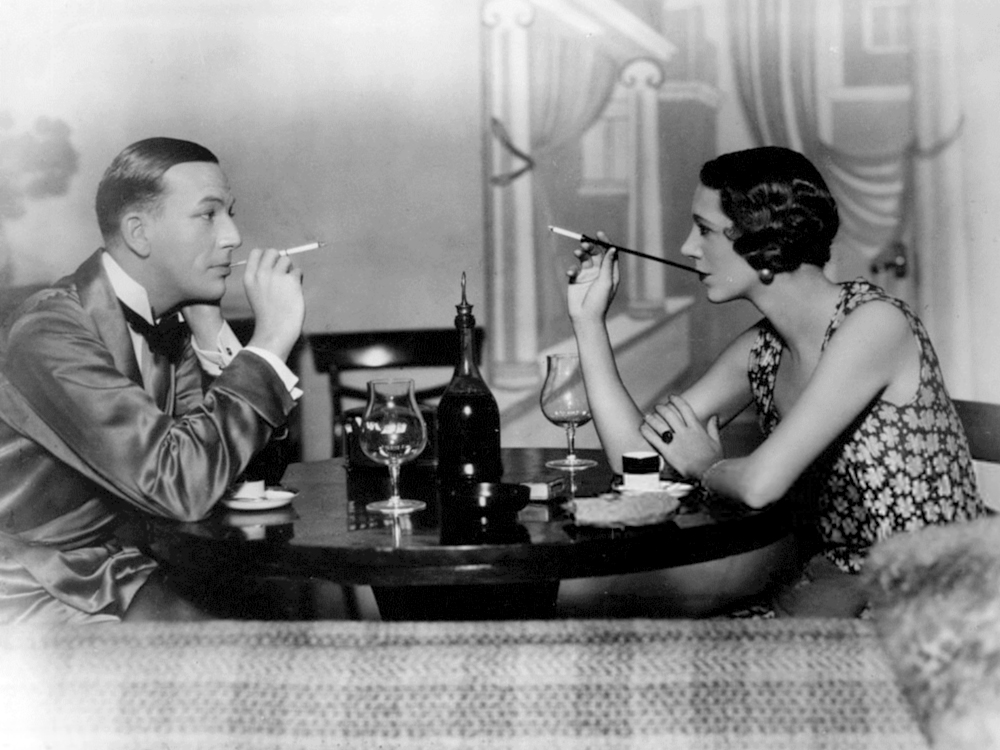
Noël Coward and Gertrude Lawrence in the Broadway production of Private Lives (1931)

After dinner at the Paris flat several days later, Elyot and Amanda use their code word "Solomon Isaacs", soon abbreviated to "Sollocks", to stop their arguments from getting out of hand. They kiss passionately, but the harmony cannot last: whilst Elyot and Amanda cannot live without each other, neither can they live together. They argue violently and try to outwit each other, just as they had done during their stormy marriage. Their ongoing argument escalates to a point of fury, as Amanda breaks a record over Elyot's head and he retaliates by slapping her face. They seem trapped in a repeating cycle of love and hate, consumed by their private passions and jealousies. At the height of their biggest fight, Sibyl and Victor walk in.

Act 3

The next morning Amanda tries to sneak away early but is surprised to find Sibyl and Victor there. As they talk, Elyot enters, and he and Amanda start bickering again. It has been decided that neither of the new spouses will grant a divorce for a year, to give Amanda and Elyot time to confirm if this is really what they want. As tempers rise, Sibyl and Victor begin to bicker with each other, defending their respective spouses. Amanda and Elyot realise that Sibyl and Victor are as suited to each other as they are, forgive each other and sneak out, leaving the younger two together. As Elyot and Amanda tiptoe out, Victor and Sibyl have reached the point of mutual violence.

== Productions ==
=== Original productions ===
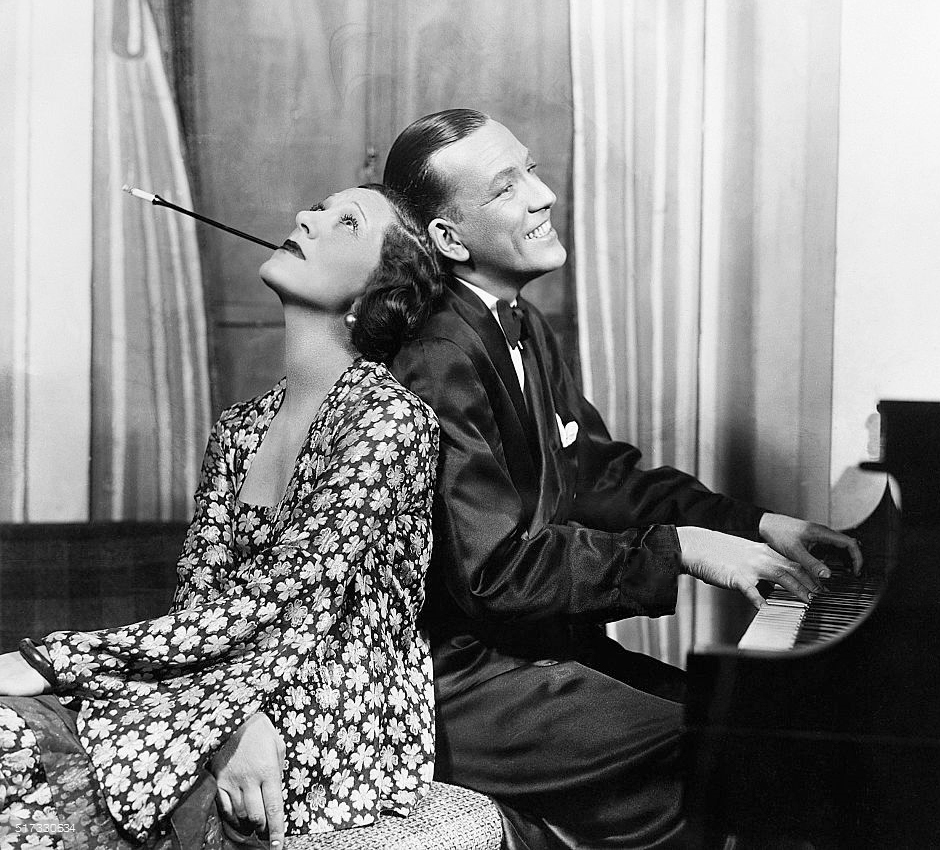

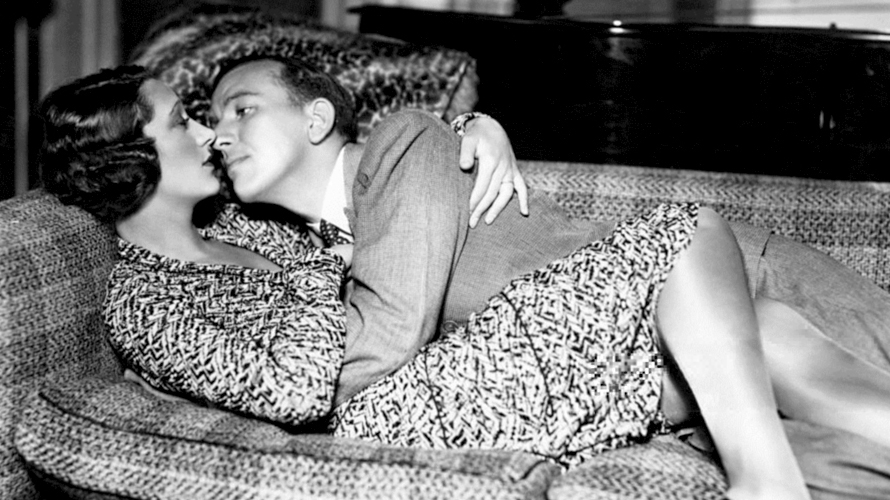
Gertrude Lawrence and Noël Coward in the Broadway production of Private Lives (1931)

Produced by C. B. Cochran, the play premiered on 18 August 1930, at the King's Theatre in Edinburgh, directed by Coward and starring Coward as Elyot, Gertrude Lawrence as Amanda, Laurence Olivier as Victor and Adrianne Allen as Sibyl. Sets and costumes were designed by Gladys Calthrop. After successfully touring Liverpool, Birmingham, Manchester and Southsea for five weeks, the production opened the new Phoenix Theatre in London on 24 September 1930. A week after the play opened, Heinemann published the text; a week later, His Master's Voice issued recordings of scenes from the play performed by Coward and Lawrence. (Note: The original recordings (catalogue number C2043) have been reissued on compact disc on several labels, such as Pavilion, PASTCD9715.) Coward disliked appearing in long runs, and the London run was therefore a limited three-month season. It sold out within a week and was still playing to packed houses when, despite "the gratifying knowledge that we could have run on for another six [months]," it ended on 20 December 1930.

The first Broadway production opened at the Times Square Theatre on 27 January 1931 with Coward, Lawrence and Olivier reprising their roles and Jill Esmond, who had married Olivier a few months earlier, as Sibyl. (Note: Adrianne Allen was pregnant and unable to travel to New York. The child to whom she gave birth was Daniel Massey, to whom Coward was godfather.) Walter Winchell described the production as "something to go quite silly over." The New York critics were enthusiastic about the play and Coward's performance. A few weeks before Coward and Lawrence were scheduled to be replaced by Otto Kruger and Madge Kennedy, Lawrence collapsed with a combined attack of laryngitis and nervous exhaustion. Coward appeared at five performances with her understudy, and then closed the production for two weeks to allow Lawrence to recuperate. She returned, and the two continued in their roles until 9 May 1931. The production ran a total of 256 performances.

=== Major revivals (1940s to 1970s) ===
The first West End revival was at the Apollo Theatre in 1944 starring John Clements and Kay Hammond. Googie Withers took over as Amanda during the run.

Over the years, the play has been revived on Broadway six times. The first of these, in 1948, starred Tallulah Bankhead as Amanda and Donald Cook as Elyot, with Barbara Baxley as Sibyl and William Langford as Victor, in a production directed by Martin Manulis at the Plymouth Theatre, where it ran for 248 performances. The production toured all but three states of the U.S., and grossed more than $1.5 million. Coward went to see the production "with my heart in my boots and was very pleasantly surprised ... her [Bankhead's] vitality was amazing, and, strange to say, she played the love scene quite beautifully."

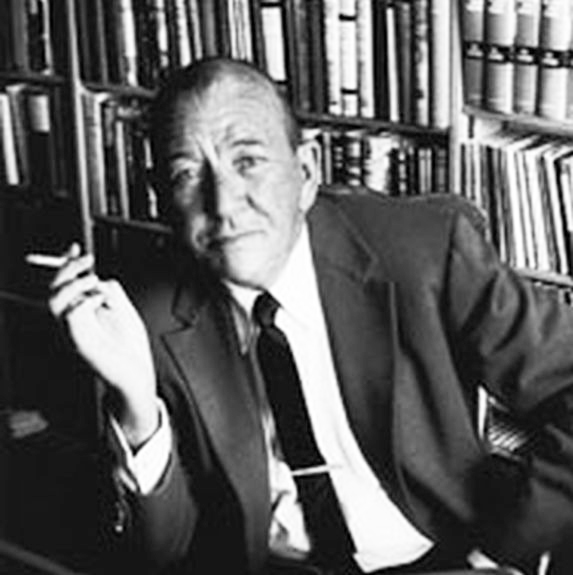
Coward in 1963

In 1963, at the start of what Coward called "Dad's Renaissance", a London revival directed by James Roose-Evans at the Hampstead Theatre Club heralded Coward's return to critical favour. The success of the production, with Edward de Souza as Elyot and Rosemary Martin as Amanda, led to its transfer to the Duke of York's Theatre. The West End producer wanted to cast established stars in the transfer, but Coward insisted that the young Hampstead cast should be retained. It ran in the West End for 212 performances. A May 1968 Off-Broadway production directed by Charles Nelson Reilly starred Elaine Stritch as Amanda, and ran for nine performances at the Theatre de Lys. A 1969 production, directed by Stephen Porter and starring Brian Bedford as Elyot and Tammy Grimes as Amanda (winning a Tony Award for her performance), with David Glover as Victor and Suzanne Grossman as Sibyl, opened at Broadway's Billy Rose Theatre and then moved to the Broadhurst Theatre to complete its run of 198 performances. The last major revival during Coward's lifetime was at the Queen's Theatre, London, in 1972. It was directed by John Gielgud and starred Maggie Smith and Robert Stephens. During the run of the production, John Standing took over as Elyot, and Jill Bennett was a replacement as Amanda. Gielgud directed a 1975 Broadway transfer of his production, starring Maggie Smith and John Standing at the 46th Street Theatre, where it ran for 92 performances. In 1978, Smith reprised her role (alongside Brian Bedford) in a Stratford Festival production of the play.

=== Major revivals (1980s to present) ===
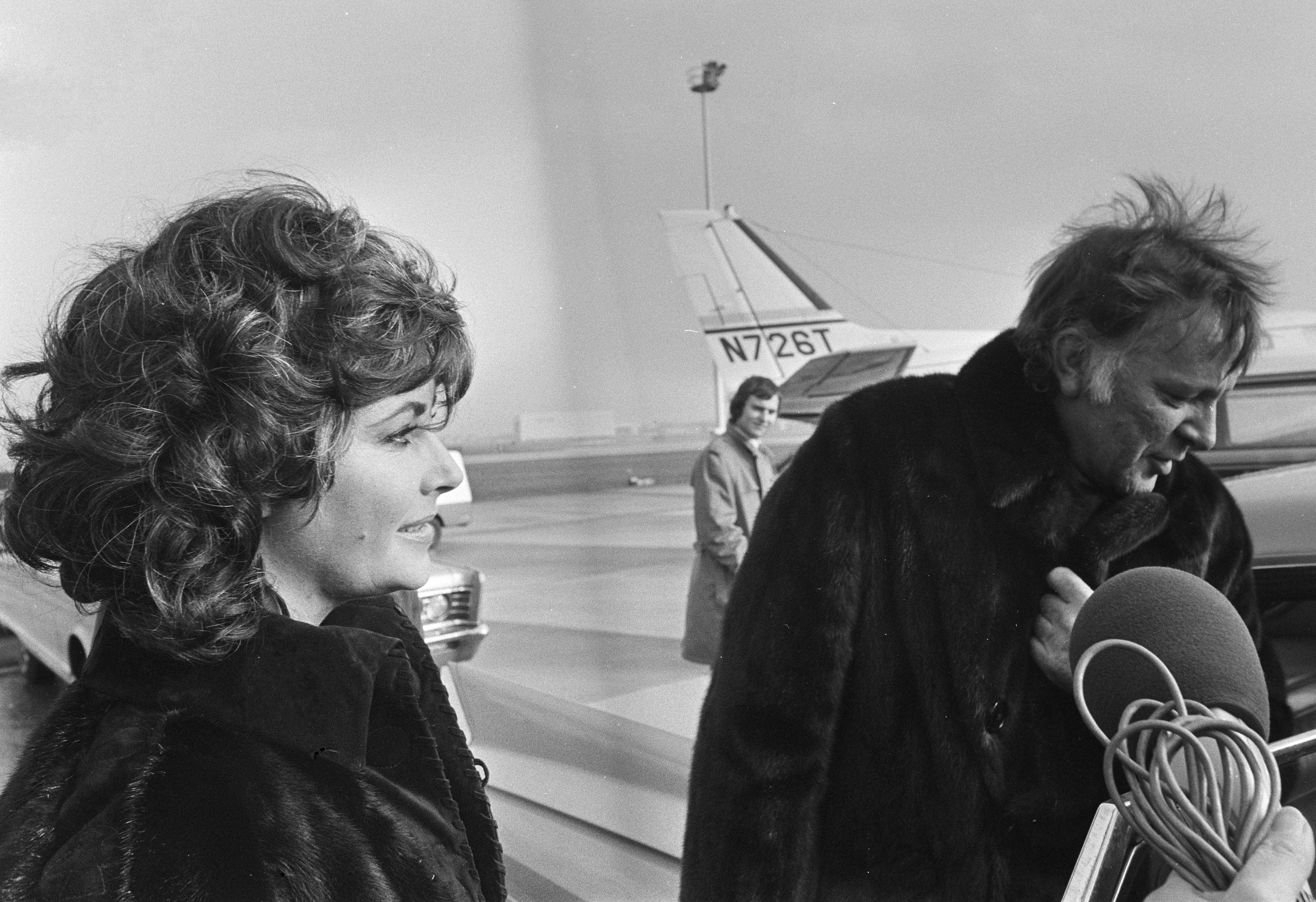
Elizabeth Taylor and Richard Burton were the headline stars in a 1983 Broadway production.

In 1980, a production from the Greenwich Theatre transferred to the Duchess Theatre in the West End. It starred Michael Jayston and Maria Aitken, and it was directed by Alan Strachan. Elizabeth Taylor as Amanda and Richard Burton as Elyot were the headliners in a highly anticipated 1983 Broadway production directed by Milton Katselas, which opened at the Lunt-Fontanne Theatre in May 1983 following a pre-Broadway run at the Shubert Theatre in Boston in April 1983. It co-starred John Cullum as Victor and Kathryn Walker as Sibyl and ran for 63 performances.

After closing on Broadway, this production toured to the John F. Kennedy Center for the Performing Arts in August and September 1983, the Shubert Theatre, Chicago, in September, and the Wilshire Theatre, Los Angeles, in October 1983.

In 1990, a revival at the Aldwych Theatre, London, starring Keith Baxter and Joan Collins, directed by Tim Luscombe, was not well received, although Sara Crowe as Sybil won an Olivier Award for Actress in a Supporting Role. Arvin Brown directed Collins as Amanda and Simon Jones as Elyot in a 1992 Broadway production that closed after 11 previews and 37 performances at the Broadhurst Theatre. The last West End production of the 20th century was at the National Theatre, running from May to September 1999, with Anton Lesser as Elyot and Juliet Stevenson as Amanda, directed by Philip Franks.

A 2001 London revival emphasised the harshness and darker side of the play; it starred Alan Rickman and Lindsay Duncan, directed by Howard Davies at the Albery Theatre (subsequently renamed the Noël Coward Theatre). Duncan won the Olivier Award for her performance, Tim Hatley won for his set designs, and Jenny Beavan won for costumes. A Broadway transfer of Davies's West End production, starring Rickman and Duncan, ran for 127 performances at the Richard Rodgers Theatre in 2002. It won the Tony Award for Best Revival, while Duncan won for Leading Actress and Hatley won for sets. In 2009 at its new home, the Hampstead Theatre presented a revival directed by Lucy Bailey, with Jasper Britton as Elyot and Claire Price as Amanda.

A 2010 revival at the Vaudeville Theatre in London was directed by Richard Eyre and starred Matthew Macfadyen as Elyot and Kim Cattrall as Amanda. The ten-week limited season ran from February to May 2010. This production then moved to North America, starring Cattrall and Paul Gross. It had tryouts in Toronto from 16 September to 30 October 2011 and played on Broadway at the Music Box Theatre from 6 November, with an official opening on 17 November. Simon Paisley Day played Victor, and Anna Madeley played Sibyl. The production closed early, on 31 December 2011.

A production ran at the Chichester Festival Theatre from 28 September (previews from 21 September) to 27 October 2012, starring Anna Chancellor as Amanda and Toby Stephens as Elyot, with Anthony Calf as Victor and Anna-Louise Plowman as Sibyl. It was directed by Jonathan Kent. This production was reprised with the same cast at the Gielgud Theatre, in London, from 3 July (previews from 22 June) to 21 September 2013. This performance was broadcast to participating cinemas in the UK from 6 February 2014, and in the US on 11 December 2013, by CinemaLive and Digital Theatre in their West End Theatre Series.

A UK tour of Private Lives starring Patricia Hodge and Nigel Havers opened in October 2021 in Bath. This production cast all the lead roles as much older than in previous productions, which was initially met with scepticism. However, the change was received well by audiences and the tour broke several box-office records before ending in Nottingham in April 2022. This production transferred to the Ambassadors Theatre in the West End from 31 August to 25 November 2023.

Another revival ran at the Donmar Warehouse in London from 7 April to 27 May 2023. The production starred Stephen Mangan, Rachael Stirling, Laura Carmichael, and Sargon Yelda.

In March 2026 the Royal Exchange Theatre revived the play in a production directed by Blanche McIntyre, which starred Jill Halfpenny as Amanda, Steve John Shepherd as Elyot, Daniel Millar as Victor, Shazia Nicholls as Sybil, and Sara Lessore as Louise.

A 2026 Rose Theatre, Octagon Theatre, Bolton and Mercury Theatre co-production of the play ran in September and October at each of the three theatres in turn; the cast included Ashley Gerlach, Chirag Benedict Lobo, Pepter Lunkuse and Sade Malone.

== Critical reception ==
The original production received mixed reviews. Coward later wrote, "The critics described Private Lives variously as 'tenuous, thin, brittle, gossamer, iridescent, and delightfully daring'. All of which connoted in the public mind cocktails, repartee and irreverent allusions to copulation, thereby causing a gratifying number of respectable people to queue up at the box office." The Times wrote, "What an entertaining play it is!", but wondered if any other performers could bring it off. Allardyce Nicoll called it "amusing, no doubt, yet hardly moving farther below the surface than a paper boat in a bathtub and, like the paper boat, ever in imminent danger of becoming a shapeless, sodden mass." The Manchester Guardian commented, "The audience evidently found it a good entertainment, but Mr. Coward certainly had not flattered our intelligence. The play appears to be based on the theory that anything will do provided it be neatly done." The Observer also thought that the play depended on brilliant acting and thought the characters unrealistic, though "None the less, for a couple of hours they are delicious company when Mr. Coward is master of unceremonious ceremonies." (Note: Both the Guardian and Observer reviews were by Ivor Brown, whose austere view in the former (a daily paper) had evidently mellowed by the time he wrote for the latter, a Sunday paper.) The New Statesman discerned a sad side to the play in its story of a couple who can live neither with nor without each other: "It is not the least of Mr. Coward's achievements that he has ... disguised the grimness of his play and that his conception of love is really desolating."

When the text was published, The Times called it "unreadable", (Note: The Times classed Coward alongside dramatists from Ben Jonson to J. M. Barrie as better on the stage than on the page.) and The Times Literary Supplement found it "inexpressibly tedious" in print but acknowledged that its effectiveness on stage was "proved by the delight of a theatrical audience." T. E. Lawrence, however, wrote, "The play reads astonishingly well ... superb prose." The editor of The Gramophone greeted Coward and Lawrence's 1930 recording of scenes from the play as a success and added, "I wish that Noel Coward would find time to write a short play for the gramophone, for neither of these extracts has enough completeness to bear indefinite repetition."

== Literary analysis ==
Private Lives has been the subject of literary analysis under a range of literary theories. Coward expressed a dim view of such analyses: "Many years ago an earnest young man wrote a book about my plays. It was very intelligent and absolute rubbish." In a 2005 article, Penny Farfan analyses the play from the point of view of queer theory, arguing that "the subversiveness of [Coward's] sexual identity is reflected in his work," and that Private Lives questions "the conventional gender norms on which compulsory heterosexuality depends." Positing that the leading characters' portrayal as equals is evidence in support of this theory, Farfan instances the famous image (shown above) of Coward and Lawrence as Elyot and Amanda smoking and "posing as mirror opposites". Coward himself pronounced the play "psychologically unstable", and John Lahr in a 1982 study of Coward's plays writes, "Elyot and Amanda's outrageousness is used to propound the aesthetics of high camp – an essentially homosexual view of the world that justifies detachment". However, in a 1992 article on "Coward and the Politics of Homosexual Representation", Alan Sinfield, examining gay aspects of Coward's major plays, mentions Private Lives only in passing. The critic Michael Billington writes of the piece, "It is not a closet gay play but a classic about the mysterious charm of androgeny [sic]."

The play has been analysed as part of the theatre of the absurd. In a 1984 article, Archie J. Loss argues that nothing can ever happen in the relationship of Elyot and Amanda, because it is based on conflicting emotions: "they are bound to repeat themselves, playing out their scene again and again with different words and different props but always with the same result." In a 2000 study of Coward, Jean Chothia instances surreal exchanges in the play, such as: "Have you ever crossed the Sahara on a camel?" "Frequently. When I was a boy we used to do it all the time. My Grandmother had a wonderful seat on a camel."

== Film and broadcast versions ==
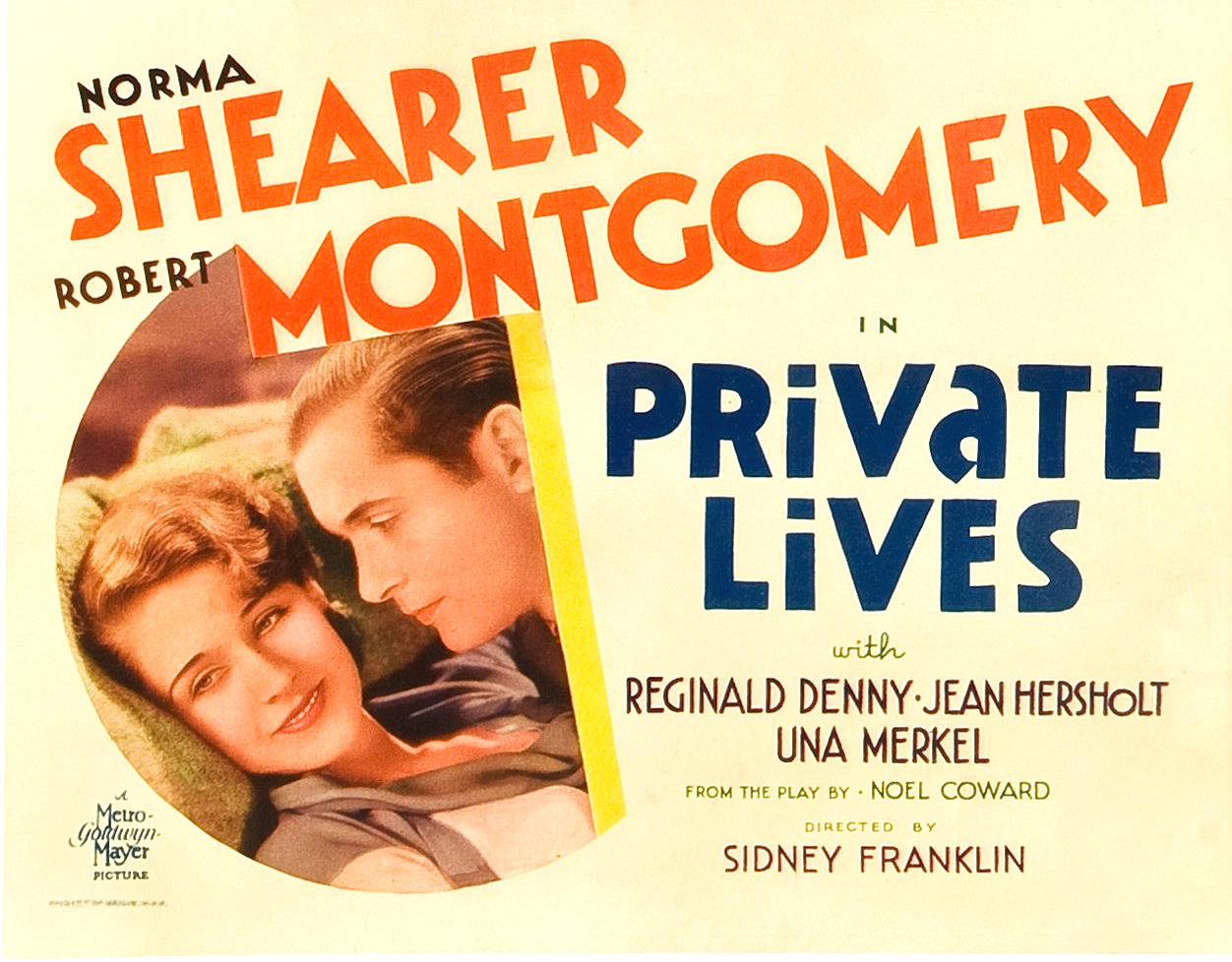
Poster for the 1931 film, starring Norma Shearer and Robert Montgomery

Hanns Kräly and Richard Schayer wrote the screenplay for a 1931 film adaptation directed by Sidney Franklin and starring Norma Shearer as Amanda and Robert Montgomery as Elyot. Una Merkel and Reginald Denny played Sibyl and Victor. The film received mixed reviews. Coward thought it "passable."

In the early-to-mid-1980s, Peter Bogdanovich was asked to do a second film adaptation, with Elizabeth Taylor and Richard Burton, which was set to be shot in the Rivera until they decided just to film it on stage. Prior to this, around 1974, there had been talk of Bogdanovich staging Private Lives as a revival on Broadway, with the participation of Audrey Hepburn. Later on, in 1990, Bogdanovich wrote a second draft adaptation of the play, which he had hoped to make with Hepburn starring. However, Bogdanovich credits the film's demise to Billy Wilder, who didn't like him: "The executives asked [Wilder] what he thought of the idea. He said, 'Bad idea.' That was the end of that."

The play has been adapted for broadcasting on several occasions. In April 1939 CBS Radio aired an hour-long adaptation of the play by Orson Welles: Gertrude Lawrence guest starred, reprising her stage role as Amanda; Welles played Elyot, Naomi Campbell Sybil and Robert Speaight Victor. In August of the same year BBC Television transmitted an adaptation starring Diana Churchill and Denis Webb.

In the post-war years, the BBC returned to the play, broadcasting a BBC Radio adaptation in May 1951 with Hugh Sinclair and Googie Withers. A 1958 BBC radio adaptation starred William Fox and Mary Wimbush, broadcast as part of the BBC's "Noël Coward Festival". On British commercial television, Peter Gray and Maxine Audley starred in a 1959 presentation.

To mark the author's seventieth birthday in December 1969, BBC radio presented a production starring Moira Lister and Edward de Souza. In December 1975 BBC radio broadcast further adaptation, starring Paul Scofield and Patricia Routledge, later released as a commercial recording. Alec McCowen and Penelope Keith took the leads in a BBC television production in 1976. In January 2010 BBC Radio 4 broadcast another adaptation of the play directed by Sally Avens, starring Helena Bonham Carter as Amanda and Bill Nighy as Elyot.

== Awards ==
The premiere of Private Lives predates both the Olivier Awards and Tony Awards. The 1969 Broadway production of Private Lives was the first to receive major theatre awards, with Tammy Grimes winning both the Tony Award for Leading Actress in a Play and the Drama Desk Award for Outstanding Actress during the 1970 awards season. Brian Bedford won the Drama Desk Award for Outstanding Actor.

The 2001 London production won three Olivier Awards out of seven nominations, for Lindsay Duncan as Amanda and the set designs by Tim Hatley and costumes by Jenny Beavan. On Broadway in 2002, the same production won three Tonys out of five nominations, including Best Revival, Best Actress (Duncan) and Best Scenic Design (Hatley). It also won the corresponding three Drama Desk awards, out of seven nominations.

== Notes, references and sources ==
=== Sources ===
- Billington, Michael (2023). "Introduction". Hay Fever. London: Methuen. ISBN 978-1-35-035411-1.
- Castle, Charles (1972). Noël. London: W. H. Allen. ISBN 0-491-00534-2.
- Coward, Noël (2000) [1930]. Private Lives: An Intimate Comedy in Three Acts. London: Methuen. ISBN 0-413-74490-6.
- Coward, Noël (2004) [1937]. Present Indicative Autobiography to 1931. London: Methuen. ISBN 978-0-413-77413-2.
- Coward, Noël (2007). Barry Day (ed.). The Letters of Noël Coward. London: Methuen. ISBN 978-0-7136-8578-7.
- Hoare, Philip (1995). Noël Coward, A Biography. London: Sinclair-Stevenson. ISBN 1-85619-265-2.
- Kaplan, Joel; Sheila Stowel (2000). Look Back in Pleasure: Noël Coward Reconsidered. London: Methuen. ISBN 0-413-75500-2.
- Lahr, John (1982). Coward the Playwright. London: Methuen. ISBN 0-413-48050-X.
- Lesley, Cole (1976). The Life of Noël Coward. London: Cape. ISBN 0-224-01288-6.
- Morley, Sheridan (1986) [1969]. A Talent to Amuse: A Biography of Noël Coward (second ed.). London: Pavilion. ISBN 1-85145-064-5.
- Richards, Dick (1970). The Wit of Noël Coward. London: Sphere Books. ISBN 0-7221-3676-5.
- Yule, Andrew (1992). Picture Shows: The Life and Films of Peter Bogdanovich. New York: Limelight Editions. ISBN 0-87-910153-9.
