= Corinna Mura =

American singer and diseuse (1910–1965)

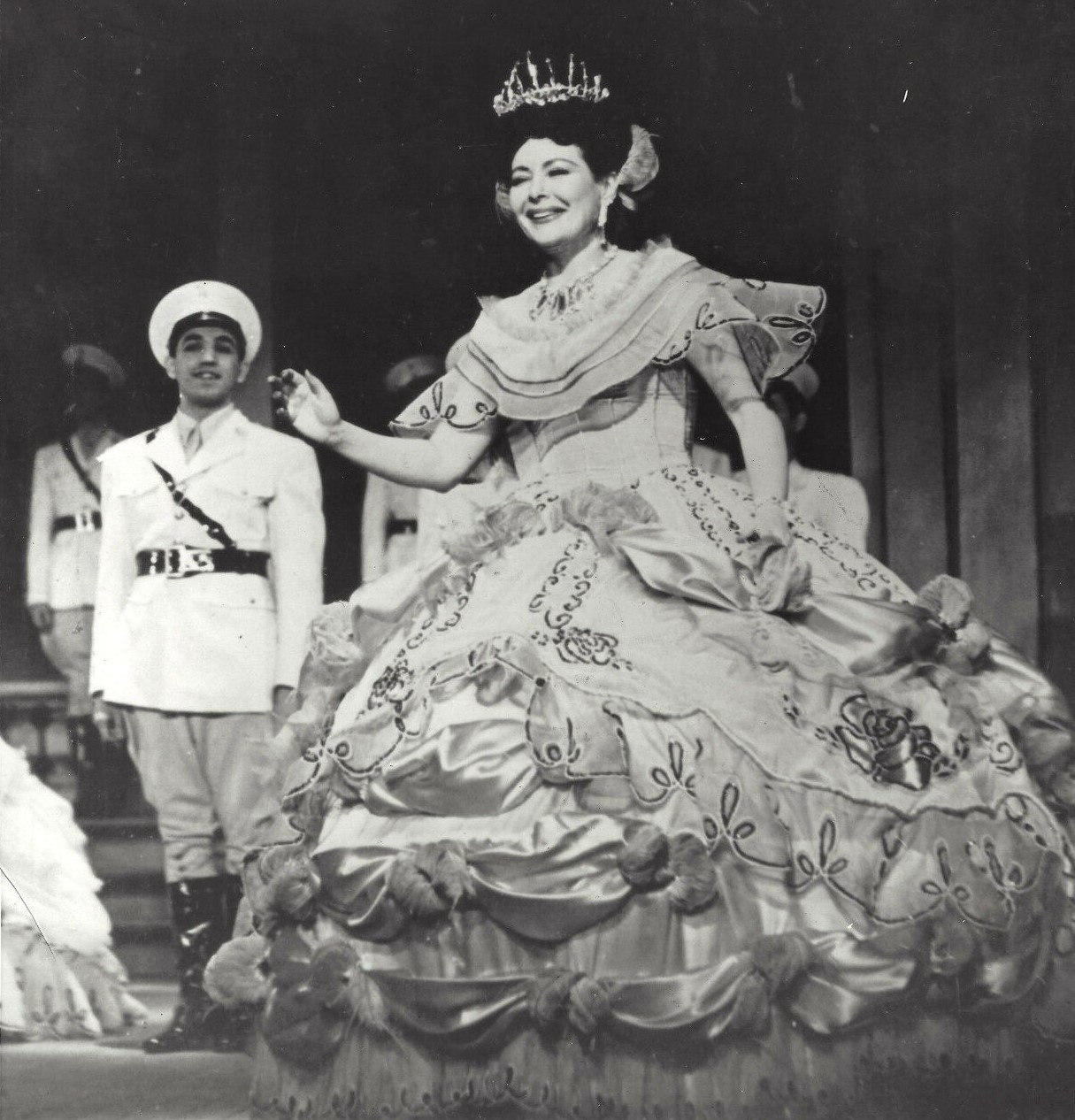
- Mura in the musical Mexican Hayride, 1944
- Born: Corinna Wall; March 16, 1910; San Antonio, Texas, U.S.
- Died: August 1, 1965 (aged 55); Mexico City, Mexico
- Occupations: Singer; diseuse; actress
- Years active: 1942–1957
- Notable work: Casablanca

Corinna Mura (born Corinna Wall; March 16, 1910 – August 1, 1965) was an American cabaret singer, actress, and diseuse. She had a small role in the classic film Casablanca as the woman playing the guitar while singing "Tango Delle Rose" and "La Marseillaise" at Rick's Café Américain.

== Biography ==
Mura was born in San Antonio, Texas, in 1910. As a child she was trained by her parents, Lillian Bright (nee West) and D. Buckner Wall, to become a coloratura soprano. She sang three times for President Franklin D. Roosevelt. In 1944, Mura appeared in Cole Porter's hit Broadway musical Mexican Hayride, and can be heard in two numbers on the Decca original-cast album. She was stepmother to author/illustrator Edward Gorey.

== Death ==
She died in Mexico City on 1 August 1965, at 55 years of age, from cancer.

== Filmography ==
Year	Title	Role	Notes
1942	Call Out the Marines	Zana Zaranda	
1942	Prisoner of Japan	Loti	
1942	Casablanca	Singer with Guitar	Uncredited
1944	Passage to Marseille	Singer	
1945	The Gay Senorita	Corina	
1947	Honeymoon	Senora Mendoza	
1957	The Helen Morgan Story	Guitarist	Uncredited (final film role)
