= Private Lives (1931 film) =

1931 film

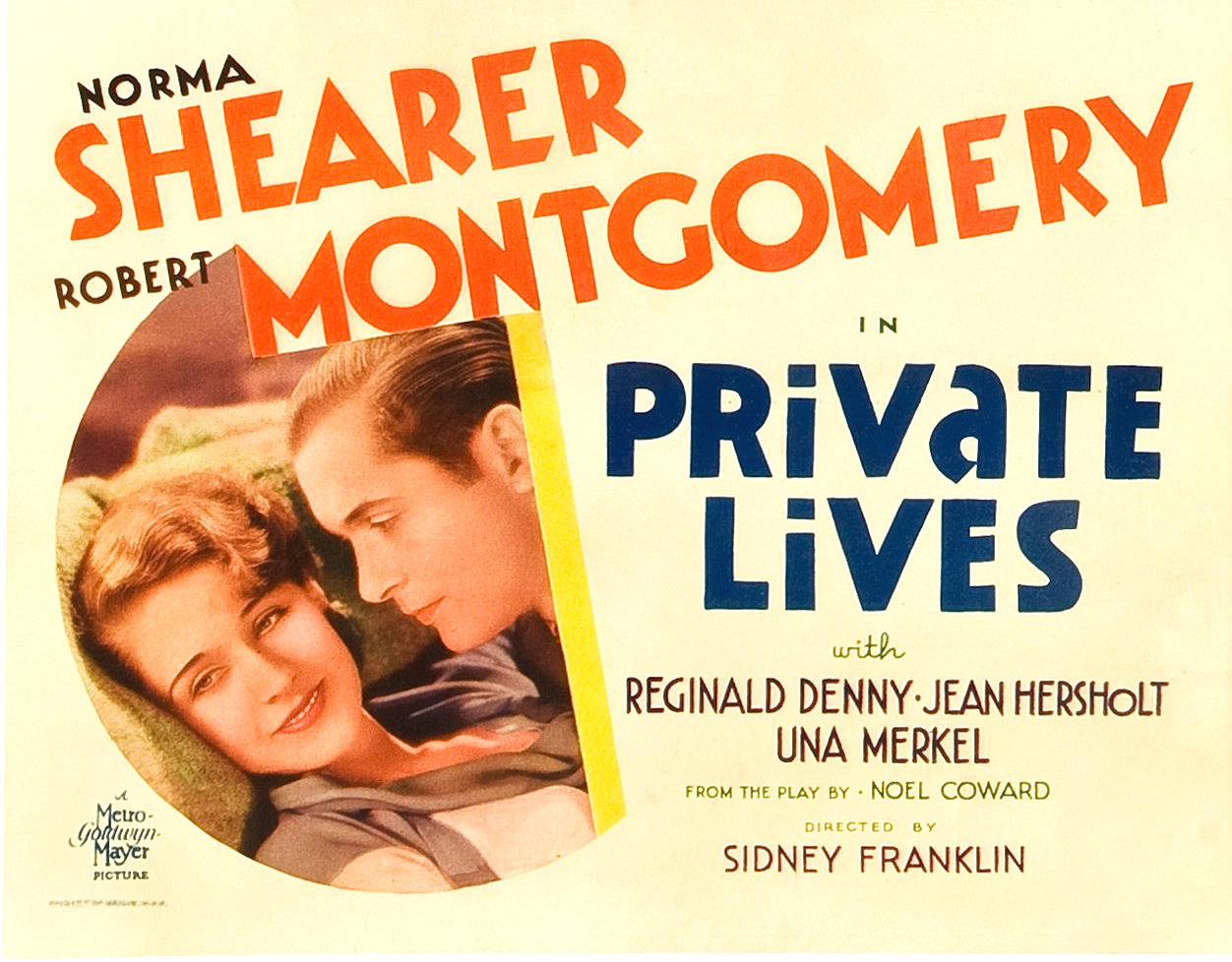
- Film poster
- Directed by: Sidney Franklin
- Written by: Hanns Kräly; Richard Schayer
- Based on: Private Lives; 1930 play by Noël Coward
- Produced by: Irving Thalberg
- Starring: Norma Shearer; Robert Montgomery
- Cinematography: Ray Binger
- Edited by: Conrad A. Nervig
- Music by: William Axt
- Distributed by: Metro-Goldwyn-Mayer
- Release date: December 12, 1931
- Running time: 84 minutes
- Country: United States
- Language: English

Private Lives is a 1931 American pre-Code comedy film directed by Sidney Franklin. The screenplay by Hanns Kräly and Richard Schayer is based on the 1930 play Private Lives by Noël Coward.

== Plot ==
Elyot Chase and Amanda Prynne, divorced after a tempestuous marriage, are dismayed to discover they both have opted to honeymoon with their new spouses at the same hotel on the French Riviera. Elyot finds his bride Sybil's questions about Amanda annoying, while Amanda wishes her new husband Victor would stop referring to Elyot every chance he gets. When Elyot discovers Amanda on the terrace their adjoining suites share, he insists he and Sybil immediately depart for Paris, the same plan Amanda proposes to Victor. The two ex-spouses quarrel with their new mates, both of whom set off in search of peace and quiet.

Left to reminisce, Elyot and Amanda rekindle their relationship with a kiss and make a pact to put an end to any verbal battles when either one utters the name "Solomon Isaacs." The two then abandon their hotel and flee to St. Moritz, but before long they begin a spat that evolves into a major fight about a phonograph record, which Amanda breaks over Elyot's head, an action that leads to total destruction of their hotel room. Rushing out, Amanda meets Victor and Sybil, who have tracked down the prodigal duo, and everyone becomes involved in the dispute. Things finally calm down, and the two couples meet for breakfast the next day, but when Victor and Sybil begin to fight, Elyot and Amanda walk out and depart the resort by train.

== Cast ==
- Norma Shearer as Amanda Prynne
- Robert Montgomery as Elyot Chase
- Reginald Denny as Victor Prynne
- Una Merkel as Sibyl Chase
- Jean Hersholt as Oscar
- George Davis as Bell Hop

== Production ==
When Noël Coward's play proved to be a hit both in London and on Broadway, MGM executive Irving Thalberg bought the rights for a film adaptation starring his wife, Norma Shearer. Coward was uncertain if Shearer was capable of handling the sophisticated dialogue of his comedy of manners, but the actress confidently proclaimed, "I don't care what he thinks—he thinks in theater terms—I think in film terms. It doesn't seem to occur to Mr. Coward that we both may turn out to be right!" She personally suggested Robert Montgomery, who already had appeared in three films opposite her, for her co-star.

The studio filmed a performance of the play with Coward and Gertrude Lawrence, which the director and cast closely followed. According to Coward's biographer Cole Lesley, the playwright was pleased with the outcome and described the leading performers as "perfectly charming." The film's critical acclaim and financial success proved instrumental in helping Coward sell the film rights to several other plays.

Exteriors were filmed in Franklin Canyon in the Santa Monica Mountains and Glacier National Park, Montana. The song "Someday I'll Find You" sung by Shearer and frequently heard as an underscore on the soundtrack, was written by Coward.

== Critical reception ==
Mordaunt Hall of The New York Times called the film "a swift and witty picture" and "one of the most intelligent comedies that has come to the screen." He added, "Sidney Franklin's direction is excellent and Norma Shearer as Amanda Prynne gives an alert, sharp portrayal . . . Robert Montgomery struggles with matters at the outset, but he soon succeeds in doing well enough with his rôle . . . Una Merkel and Reginald Denny both deserve a great deal of credit for their work."

== See also ==
- We Were Dancing – 1942 film starring Norma Shearer, based on play Tonight at 8.30 by Noël Coward
