= Monika Vogelsang =

1920 film

- Directed by: Rudolf Biebrach
- Written by: Hanns Kräly; Robert Wiene
- Starring: Henny Porten; Paul Hartmann; Ernst Deutsch
- Cinematography: Bruno Fellmer; Willy Gaebel
- Music by: Giuseppe Becce
- Production company: Messter Film
- Distributed by: UFA
- Release date: 2 January 1920
- Running time: 103 minutes
- Country: Germany
- Languages: Silent; German intertitles

Monika Vogelsang is a 1920 German silent historical drama film directed by Rudolf Biebrach and starring Henny Porten, Paul Hartmann and Ernst Deutsch.

The film's sets were designed by the art director Emil Hasler and Jack Winter. Location shooting took place at Rothenburg in Bavaria.

== Cast ==
- Henny Porten as Monica Vogelsang
- Paul Hartmann as Amadeo Vaselli, Kirchenmaler
- Ernst Deutsch as Johannes Walterspiel
- Gustav Botz as Jacobus Martinus Vogelsang, Ratsherr zu Baldersgrün
- Elsa Wagner as Ursula Schwertfeger, Monikas Amme
- Julius Sachs as Giacomo Vaselli, Monikas Lehrer
- Ilka Grüning as Witwe Walterspiel
- Wilhelm Diegelmann as Erzbischof Josephus Hammerschid
- Max Maximilian as Der Weibl
- Wilhelm Schmidt as Nachtwächter

== Bibliography ==
- Bock, Hans-Michael & Bergfelder, Tim. The Concise CineGraph. Encyclopedia of German Cinema. Berghahn Books, 2009.
