= Hanns Kräly =

German actor

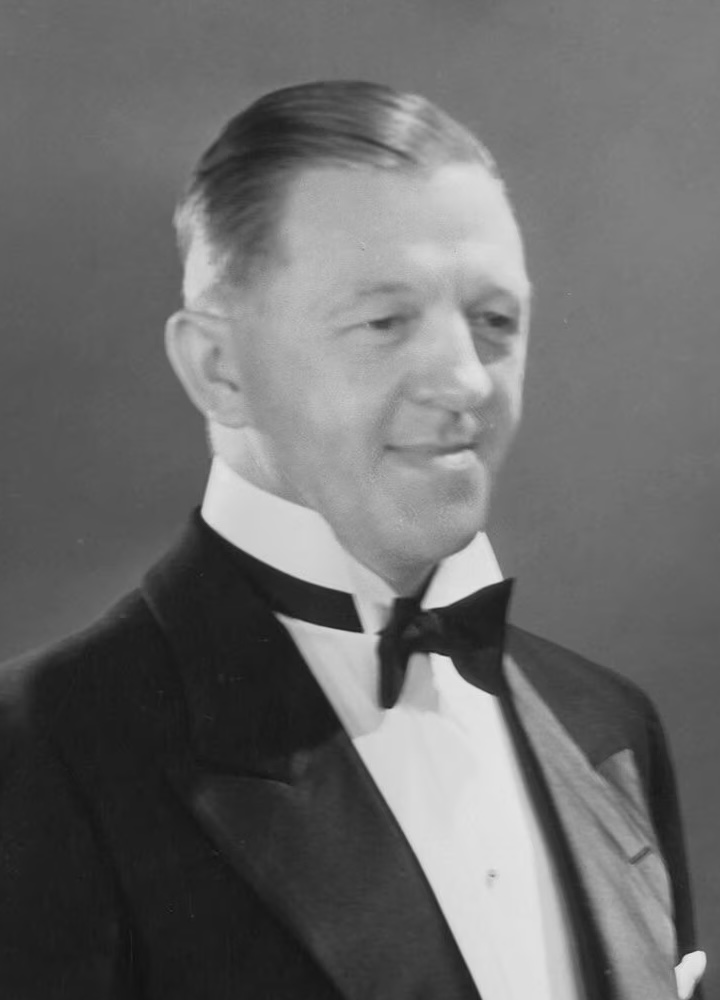
- Kräly at the 2nd Academy Awards in 1930
- Born: June 16, 1884; Hamburg, German Empire
- Died: November 10, 1950 (aged 66); Los Angeles, United States
- Occupations: Screenwriter, Journalist
- Years active: 1915–1945
- Spouse: Elsie (1913–1931)
- Children: 1

Hanns Kräly (June 16, 1884 – November 10, 1950), credited in the United States as Hans Kraly, was a German actor and screenwriter. His main collaborations were with director Ernst Lubitsch, and they worked together on 30 films between 1915 and 1929. Kräly is also notable for his comedy play Kohlhiesel's Daughters which has been turned into films on a number of occasions.

Kräly was nominated for three Academy Awards for writing. He won the award for Best Writing with The Patriot in 1930. He was also nominated for the adapted screenplay of The Last of Mrs. Cheyney, also in 1930, and for Original Screenplay of One Hundred Men and a Girl in 1937. Additional screenwriting credits include Private Lives and Just a Gigolo, both released in 1931. After a decline of screenwriting credits, Kräly dropped out of the Screen Writers Guild in 1945, ending his career as a screenwriter.

== Personal life ==
In 1930, Kräly's longstanding partnership with Ernst Lubitsch came to an end due to an affair he was having with Lubitsch's then-wife Helene Krauss. At the same time, his wife, Elsie, filed for divorce. During his marriage with Elsie, they had one child.

== Death ==
On November 10, 1950, Kräly died in Los Angeles, California at the Los Angeles General Medical Center. He was buried at the Pierce Brothers Westwood Village Memorial Park and Mortuary on November 14, 1950. A eulogy was delivered by actor Joseph Schildkraut, who also read Psalm 23.

== Selected filmography ==
=== Screenwriter ===
Year	Title	Director	Notes
1915	Aufs Eis geführt	Ernst Lubitsch	Earliest known collaboration with Ernst Lubitsch
1916	Shoe Palace Pinkus	Ernst Lubitsch	Also acted as a teacher
1918	Carmen	Ernst Lubitsch	Released in the United States under the name Gypsy Blood in 1921
1918	The Ballet Girl	Ernst Lubitsch	
1919	Intoxication	Ernst Lubitsch	
1919	Meyer from Berlin	Ernst Lubitsch	
1919	My Wife, the Movie Star	Ernst Lubitsch	Also acted as Dramaturg der Firma
1919	A Drive into the Blue	Rudolf Biebrach	First collaboration with Rudolf Biebrach
1919	Madame Dubarry	Ernst Lubitsch	
1919	Countess Doddy	Georg Jacoby	First collaboration with Georg Jacoby
1920	Monika Vogelsang	Rudolf Biebrach	
1920	The Grand Babylon Hotel	E. A. Dupont	
1920	The Housing Shortage	Ernst Lubitsch	
1920	Hundemamachen	Rudolf Biebrach	
1920	Romeo and Juliet in the Snow	Ernst Lubitsch	
1920	Sumurun	Ernst Lubitsch	
1923	The Flame	Ernst Lubitsch	
1923	Paradise in the Snow	Georg Jacoby	
1923	La Boheme	Gennaro Righelli	First collaboration with Gennaro Righelli, and a first collaboration with a non-German director
1924	Comedians of Life	Georg Jacoby	
1924	Three Women	Ernst Lubitsch	
1924	Her Night of Romance	Sidney Franklin	First English-language film; first collaboration with Sidney Franklin
1925	Her Sister from Paris	Sidney Franklin	
1929	Betrayal	Lewis Milestone	First work on a sound film
1929	Eternal Love	Ernst Lubitsch	Last collaboration with Ernst Lubitsch
1929	The Last of Mrs. Cheyney	Sidney Franklin	
1929	The Last of Mrs. Cheyney	Sidney Franklin	
1929	The Kiss	Jacques Feyder	
1930	Die Sehnsucht Jeder Frau	Victor Sjöström	German-language version of A Lady to Love
1930	The Lady of Scandal	Sidney Franklin	
1930	A Lady's Morals	Sidney Franklin	
1931	Private Lives (1930)	Sidney Franklin	
1932	Jenny Lind	Arthur Robison	
1933	My Lips Betray	John G. Blystone	
1933	By Candlelight	James Whale	
1941	West Point Widow	Robert Siodmak	

=== Actor ===
- The Firm Gets Married (1914) – Verkäufer
- Shoe Palace Pinkus (1916) – Teacher
- My Wife, the Movie Star (1919) – Dramaturg der Firma
