= Ernst Deutsch =

Austrian actor (1890-1969)

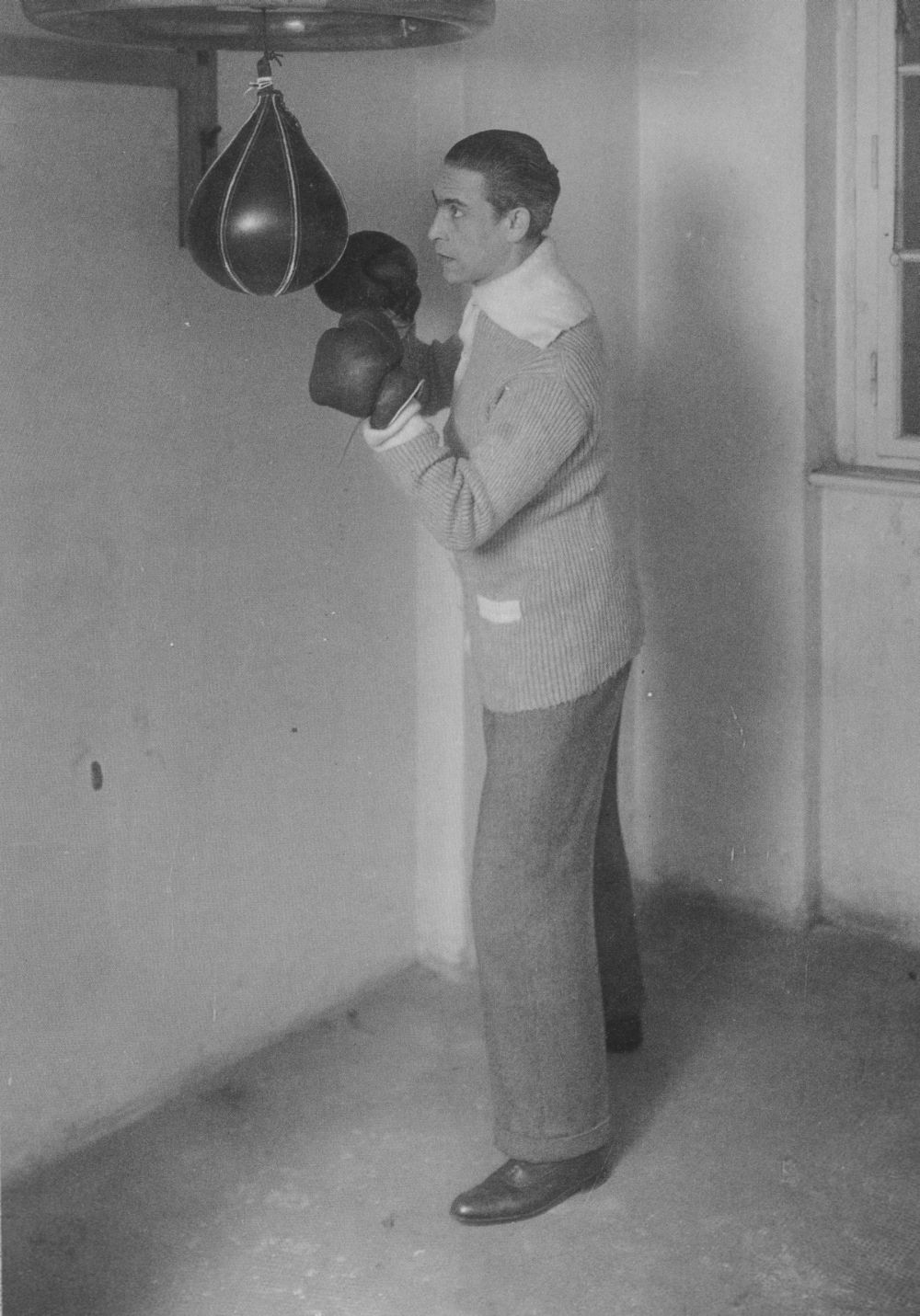
- Deutsch in his gym, 1931
- Born: 16 September 1890; Prague, Kingdom of Bohemia, Austria-Hungary (present-day Czech Republic)
- Died: 22 March 1969 (aged 78); West Berlin, West Germany
- Other name: Ernest Dorian
- Citizenship: Austria-Hungary (until 1918); United States (after 1939); Austria (after 1946)
- Occupation: Actor
- Years active: 1916–1966
- Spouse: Anuschka Fuchs (1922–1969; his death)

Ernst Deutsch (16 September 1890 – 22 March 1969), also known as Ernest Dorian, was a Czech-Austrian actor of stage and screen. He established himself in the Expressionist theatre movement in Germany during the mid-1910s, and saw success there and in Austria until the rise of Nazism led him to emigrate to the United States. After the war, he returned to Europe, where he resumed his career.

Deutsch won the Best Actor Award at the 9th Venice International Film Festival for his performance in G. W. Pabst's The Trial (1948). He is best known to international film audiences for his roles as the antihero Famulus in Paul Wegener's silent horror film The Golem: How He Came into the World (1920), and as Baron Kurtz in Carol Reed's film noir The Third Man (1949).

== Early life and education ==
Deutsch was born in Prague (then a part Austria-Hungary), the son of Jewish parents Ludwig Deutsch, a merchant, and his wife, Louise (née Kraus). He was a childhood friend of writer Franz Werfel.

During his teenage years, Deutsch was a skilled tennis player, ranking seventh on the Austro-Hungarian tennis list. After high school, Deutsch served in the army.

== Career ==
In 1914, Deutsch made his stage debut for Berthold Viertel at the People's Theatre in Vienna. After a short season in Prague, Edgar Licho hired him for the Albert Theatre in Dresden, where he moved in 1916. In Dresden, Deutsch played Franz Moor in Schiller's The Robbers and Moritz Stiefel in Frank Wedekind's Spring Awakening. His performance in the title role of Walter Hasenclever's Expressionist play The Son, which premiered on 8 October 1916, earned him critical recogniition established him as an Expressionist actor; he also appeared in the play in 1918 and 1923.

In 1917, Deutsch went to the Volksbühne in Berlin. He appeared until 1933 on a number of stages in the city, gave guest performances in Hamburg, Munich and Vienna, and participated in a tour of South America. Beginning in 1916, Deutsch appeared in 42 silent films.

In April 1933, he left Germany due to Nazi antisemitism. Deutsch returned to Vienna and Prague, gave guest performances in Zürich, Brussels and (in 1936) London where he appeared in Charles Bennett's play Page From a Diary in the West End.

In 1938 he emigrated to New York City and played briefly on Broadway in 1939 before moving to Hollywood, where he became an American citizen. Beginning 1942, he appeared as Ernest Dorian in Hollywood films, primarily as Nazis and German officers (though he also played an Imperial Japanese villain via yellowface in Prisoner of Japan). On Broadway, he starred in productions of J. B. Priestley's I Have Been Here Before and S. N. Behrman's The Talley Method.

After a 1946 stay in Buenos Aires, Deutsch returned to Vienna via Paris the following year. In Vienna, he became a member of the Burgtheater. At the National Theatre Deutsch appeared in The Helpers of God, about Red Cross founder Henri Dunant, in 1948. Three years later he moved back to Berlin, appearing at the Schiller and Schlossparktheater. Deutsch also toured in Germany and abroad.

Deutsch's film roles included Baron Kurtz in Carol Reed's film noir, The Third Man, starring Orson Welles and Joseph Cotten. He received the Volpi Cup as Best Actor at the 9th Venice International Film Festival in 1948 Venice Film Festival for his performance in Der Prozeß. Deutsch's performances in the title role of Gotthold Ephraim Lessing's Nathan the Wise and as Shylock in Shakespeare's The Merchant of Venice were critically praised. He played Nathan for more than 2,000 performances, and traveled with productions throughout Europe.

In 1964, he received an Honorary Deutscher Filmpreis for "for his continued outstanding individual contributions to the German film over the years."

== Personal life ==
He married childhood friend Anuschka Fuchsova (daughter of Prague industrialist Arthur Fuchs) in 1922. Anuschka's cousin, Herbert Fuchs of Robettin, was the brother-in-law of author Franz Werfel.

=== Death ===
Deutsch died on 22 March 1969 in West Berlin, and is buried in the Jewish cemetery on the Berlin highway.

== Legacy ==
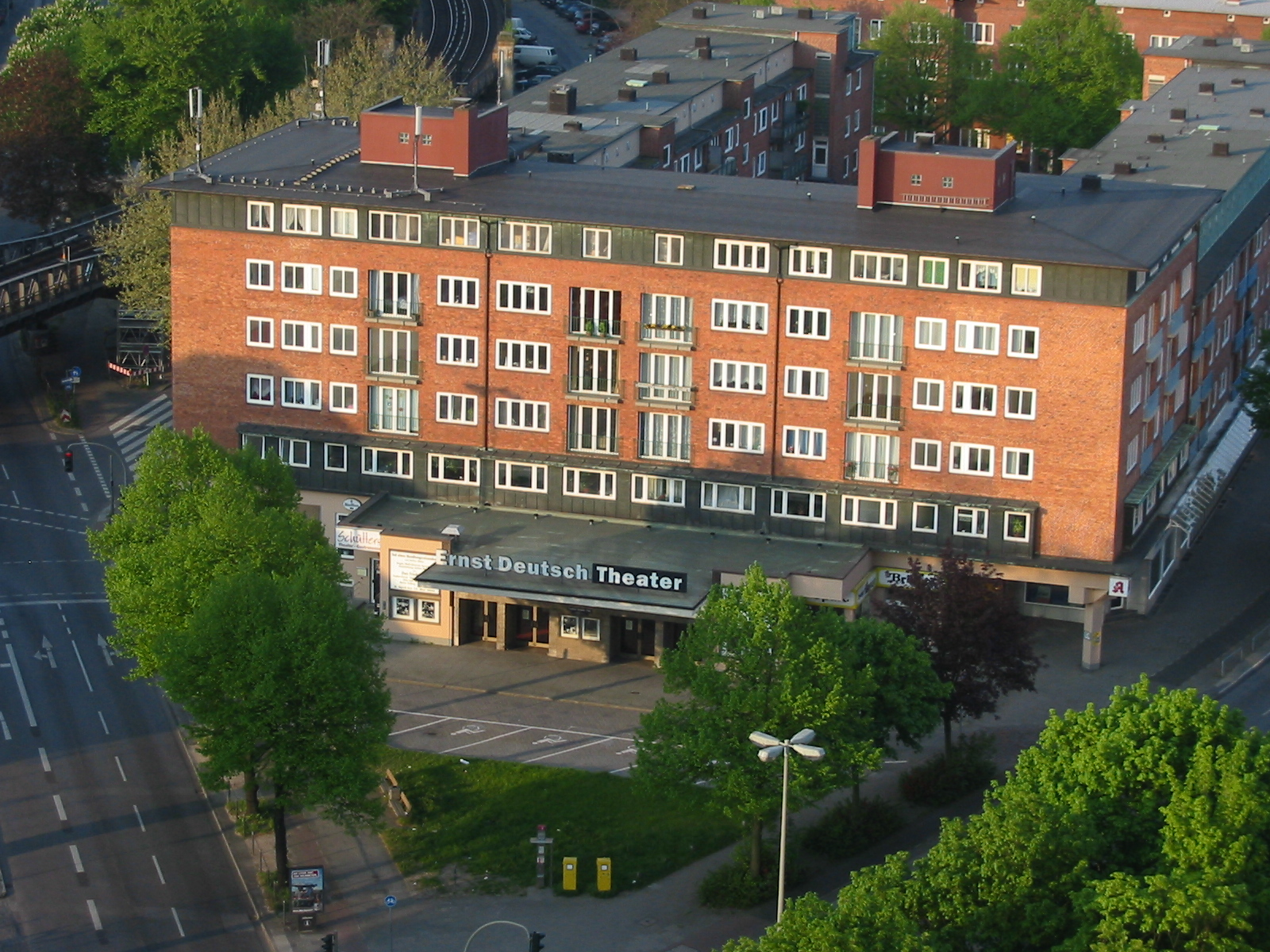
Ernst Deutsch Theater in Hamburg

On the fourth anniversary of his death in 1973, Friedrich Schütter's former Junges Theater in the Uhlenhorst quarter of Hamburg was renamed after Deutsch (who had staged a performance of Nathan The Wise there shortly before his death).

== Filmography ==
- Die Rache der Toten (1916) – Schreiber, Ferenc
- Die zweite Frau (1917) – Jesuit
- Apokalypse (1918)
- Pique Dame (1918) – Graf St-. Germain
- Irrungen (1919) – Franz, Arbeiter
- The Geisha and the Samurai (1919)
- Die Frau im Käfig (1919)
- Blonde Poison (1919) – Rolf Röm (Enkel)
- The Galley Slave (2 parts) (1919) – Galeerensträfling
- Fluch der Vergangenheit (1919)
- Vom Schicksal erdrosselt (1919) – Ernst Dutton
- Die Tochter des Henkers (1919)
- The Monastery of Sendomir (1919)
- Aladdin und die Wunderlampe (1919)
- Hate (1920)
- From Morn to Midnight (1920) – Kassierer
- Monika Vogelsang (1920) – Johannes Walterspiel
- Gerechtigkeit (1920)
- Blackmailed (1920)
- The Hunt for Death (1920)
- The Golem: How He Came into the World (1920) – Der Rabbi Famulus
- Judith Trachtenberg (1920) – Judith's Brother
- Fiebernächte (1920)
- Ferreol (1920)
- Der gelbe Tod (2 parts) (1920)
- The Women House of Brescia (1920)
- Hannerl and Her Lovers (1921) – Priester
- Burning Country (1921) – Vikar Benedikt
- Lady Godiva (1921)
- Die Dame und der Landstreicher (1922)
- Duke Ferrante's End (1922) – Orlando
- Sein ist das Gericht (1922)
- Liebe kann man nicht kaufen (1922)
- Der Kampf ums Ich (1922)
- Der alte Gospodar (1922) – Zdenko & Wolfgan
- The Pagoda (1923)
- The Burning Secret (1923)
- The Ancient Law (1923) – Baruch, sein Sohn
- Debit and Credit (1924) – Bernhard
- Dagfin (1926) – Assairan, ein Armenier
- The Bordello in Rio (1927) – Plüsch (Popescu)
- Two Under the Stars (1927) – Pierre Marescot, Eintänzer
- Artists (1928) – Der Illusionist Maranoff
- The Prisoner of Corbal (1936) – The Fugitive
- Nurse Edith Cavell (1939) – Dr. Schroeder, Public Prosecutor
- The Man I Married (1940) – Otto
- Escape (1940) – Baron von Reiber (uncredited)
- So Ends Our Night (1941) – Dr. Behr
- Prisoner of Japan (1942) – Matsuru
- Enemy Agents Meet Ellery Queen (1942) – Dr. Morse, Lido Club Physician
- Reunion in France (1942) – Captain
- The Moon Is Down (1943) – Maj. Hunter
- Night Plane from Chungking (1943) – Major Brissac
- Isle of the Dead (1945) – Dr. Drossos
- The Trial (1948) – Scharf, Tempeldiener
- The Third Man (1949) – 'Baron' Kurtz
- K – Das Haus des Schweigens (1951) – Abel de Yonkh
- When the Heath Dreams at Night (1952)
- Nathan der Weise (1955, TV film) – Nathan
- Jedermann (1958, TV film)
- Sebastian Kneipp (1958) – Pope Leo XIII
- Ein Mädchen vom Lande (1961, TV film) – Frank Elgin
- Vor Sonnenuntergang (1962, TV film) – Matthias Clausen
- In der Strafkolonie (1963, TV film) – Der Reisende
- Der Fall Bohr (1966, TV film) – Peter von Bohr (final film role)

== Bibliography ==
- Schürer, Ernst (1997). German Expressionist Plays:The German Library serial vol. 66. New York: Continuum. ISBN 978-0-8264-0950-8..
- Grange, William (2006). Historical Dictionary of German Theater. Scarecrow Press. ISBN 978-0-8108-6489-4.
- Jansohn, Christa (2006). German Shakespeare Studies at the Turn of the Twenty-first Century. University of Delaware Press. ISBN 978-0-87413-911-2.
- Sieg, Katrin (2002). Ethnic Drag: Performing Race, Nation, Sexuality in West Germany. University of Michigan Press. ISBN 0-472-11282-1.
- Nahshon, Edna (2012). Jews and Theater in an Intercultural Context. BRILL. ISBN 978-90-04-22717-0.
- Malkin, Jeanette R.; Rokem, Freddie (2010). Jews and the Making of Modern German Theatre. University of Iowa Press. ISBN 978-1-58729-934-6.
