= The Trial (1948 film) =

1948 film

- Film poster
- Directed by: G. W. Pabst
- Written by: Emmerich Roboz
- Screenplay by: Rudolf Brunngraber; Kurt Heuser; Emeric Roboz
- Produced by: Johann Alexander Hübler-Kahla
- Starring: Ewald Balser
- Cinematography: Helmut Ashley; Oskar Schnirch
- Edited by: Anna Höllering
- Music by: Alois Melichar
- Release date: 5 March 1948
- Running time: 108 minutes
- Country: Austria
- Language: German

The Trial (German: Der Prozeß) is a 1948 Austrian drama film directed by G. W. Pabst. At the 9th Venice International Film Festival, Pabst won the Award for Best Director; Ernst Deutsch won the award for Best Actor and the Volpi Cup. The story is based on the events of the Tiszaeszlár affair.

== Plot summary ==
Eszter, a young Catholic peasant girl, is treated badly by her employer and forced to run away from home. Immediately after her disappearance, a rumour spreads that the girl was murdered by some Jewish temple servants in the village, since she had last been seen at one of their homes, specifically the temple servant Scharf.

Inspector Bary was assigned investigate the case by the antisemitic Baron Ónódy. He manages to extract a confession from Scharf's young son. However, there are some discrepancies in the reconstruction of the events. This is noticed by Christian lawyer Dr. Eötvös (Ewald Balser), who personally takes charge of the defence of the accused.

== Cast ==
- Ewald Balser as Dr. Eötvös
- Marianne Schönauer as Dr. Eötvös' fiancée
- Ernst Deutsch as Scharf, temple servant
- Rega Hafenbrödl as his wife
- Albert Truby as Moritz, his son
- Heinz Moog as Baron Onody
- Maria Eis as Widow Solymosi
- Aglaja Schmid as Esther, her daughter
- Ida Russka as Bäurin (farmer) Batori, Esther's employer
- Iván Petrovich as Egressy, prosecutor
- Gustav Diessl as Both, prosecutor
- Fritz Hinz-Fabricius as Judge
- Josef Meinrad as Bary, investigating judge
