= Wide Open Faces =

1938 film by Kurt Neumann

- Directed by: Kurt Neumann
- Written by: Earle Snell; Clarence Marks; Joe Bigelow; Pat C. Flick; Richard Flournoy
- Produced by: Edward Gross; David L. Loew
- Starring: Joe E. Brown; Jane Wyman; Alison Skipworth
- Cinematography: Paul C. Vogel
- Edited by: Jack Ogilvie
- Production company: David L. Loew Productions
- Distributed by: Columbia Pictures
- Release date: April 18, 1938
- Running time: 67 minutes
- Country: United States
- Language: English

Wide Open Faces is a 1938 American comedy film directed by Kurt Neumann and starring Joe E. Brown, Jane Wyman and Alison Skipworth.

== Plot ==
A man who tries to prevent mobsters getting their hands on loot that they have stashed in an inn.

== Cast ==
- Joe E. Brown as Wilbur Meeks
- Jane Wyman as Betty Martin
- Alison Skipworth as Auntie Martha
- Lyda Roberti as Kitty Fredericks
- Alan Baxter as Tony
- Lucien Littlefield as P. T. 'Doc' Williams
- Sidney Toler as Sheriff
- Berton Churchill as L.D. Crawford
- Barbara Pepper as Belle
- Joe Downing as Stretch
- Stanley Fields as Duke Temple
- Garry Owen as Pineapple
- Dick Rich as Fingers
- Walter Wills as Hardcastle

== Bibliography ==
- Quinlan, David. The Film Lover's Companion: An A to Z Guide to 2,000 Stars and the Movies They Made. Carol Publishing Group, 1997.
