= Maximiliane Ackers =

German author and actress

Maximiliane Ackers (September 24, 1896, in Saarbrücken – April 17, 1982, in Glonn) was a lesbian German author and actress famous for writing lesbian fiction.

== Biography ==
Ackers was an actress in theater and cabarets in Göttingen, Riga, and Berlin. In the early 1920s, Ackers began working in films, writing and starring in the silent film Burning Country (Brennendes Land). In 1921, she was in the cast of Florentine Nights: the Adventures of the Count of Costa (Florentinische Nächte: Die Abenteuer der Gräfin da Costa), written by Heinrich Heine.

Ackers moved to Hannover in 1927 with her partner, the artist Irma Johanna Schäfer; they moved to the small town of Glonn in 1935. Ackers died in Glonn in 1982.

== Freundinnen ==
Ackers wrote Girlfriends: a Novel (about Women) (Freundinnen: Ein Roman (unter Frauen)), published in Hannover in 1923 and 1925 and in Berlin in 1927 and 1928. The novel explores lesbian desire in the setting of the artistic and theatrical society of Weimar Berlin. It also touches on issues of gender and sexuality: in response to being asked if one is "a girl or a boy," a character playing Puck responds: "I am what I am."

Freundinnen appeared in several editions of between 7,000 and 10,000 copies. The National Socialists banned the book in 1934 and it appeared on the official list of banned books in 1936, and was mentioned in Alfred Rosenberg's anti-lesbian pamphlet Der Sumpf. In the 1990s, the book was rediscovered by feminists and academics. Freundinnen was republished in 1995 by a German feminist publishing house. Selections from the book appeared in An Encyclopedia of German Writers, 1900-1933.
