= The Pagoda =

1923 film

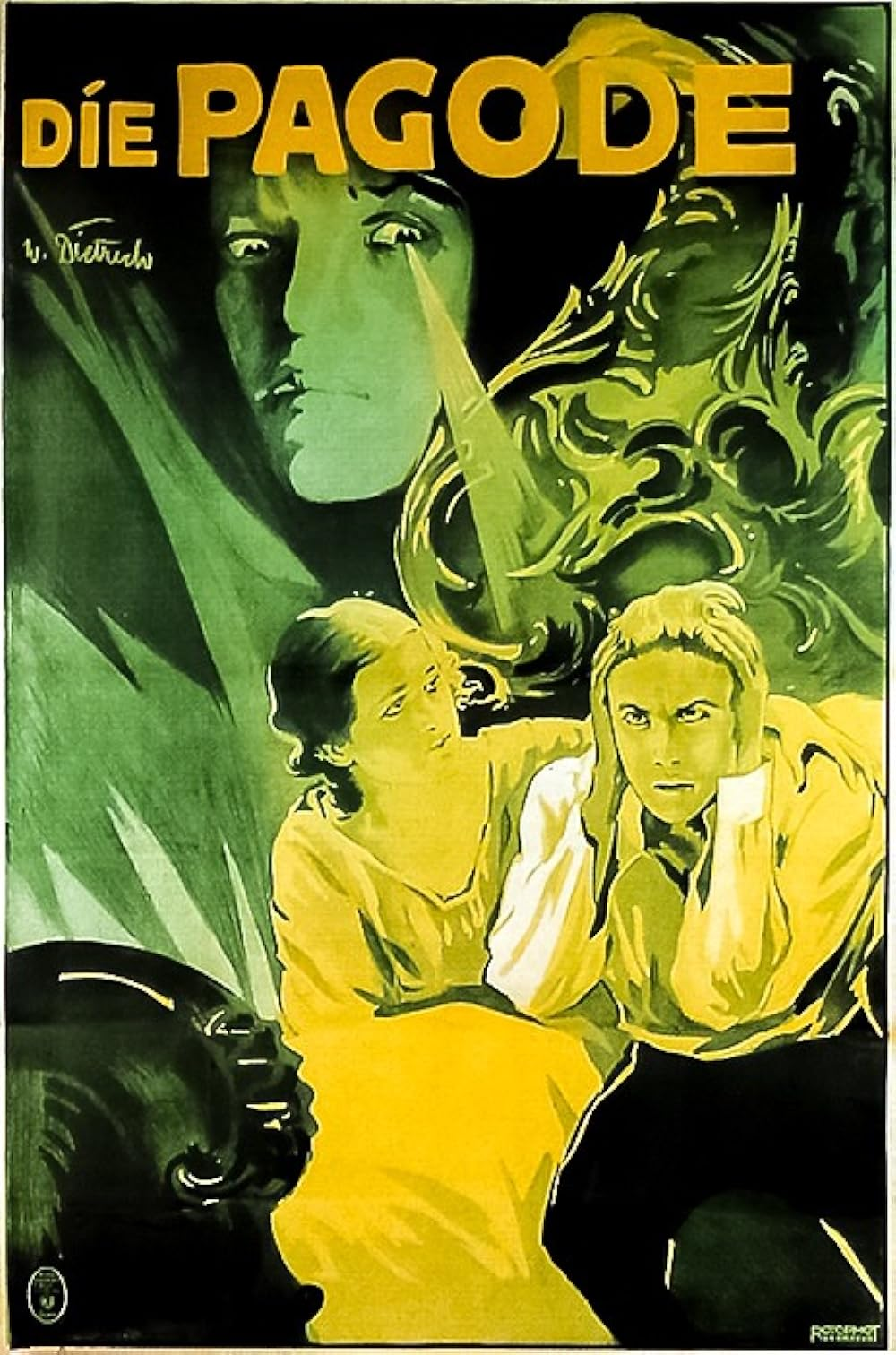
- Directed by: Alfred Fekete
- Written by: Alfred Fekete
- Produced by: Olga Chekhova
- Starring: Olga Chekhova; Ernst Deutsch; William Dieterle
- Cinematography: Stefan Lorant; Curt Helling
- Production company: Tschechowa Film
- Release date: 22 May 1923
- Country: Germany
- Languages: Silent; German intertitles

The Pagoda (German: Die Pagode) is a 1923 German silent film directed by Alfred Fekete and starring Olga Chekhova, Ernst Deutsch, and William Dieterle.

== Cast ==
- Olga Chekhova
- Ernst Deutsch
- William Dieterle
- Paul Bildt

== Bibliography ==
- Bock, Hans-Michael & Bergfelder, Tim. The Concise CineGraph. Encyclopedia of German Cinema. Berghahn Books, 2009.
