= Burning Country =

1921 film

- Directed by: Heinz Herald
- Written by: Maximiliane Ackers
- Starring: Marie Wismar; Ernst Deutsch; Kurt Vespermann; Albert Steinrück
- Cinematography: Willy Rothe
- Release date: 10 March 1921
- Country: Germany
- Languages: Silent; German intertitles

Burning Country (German: Brennendes Land) is a 1921 German silent adventure film directed by Heinz Herald and starring Marie Wismar, Ernst Deutsch, and Kurt Vespermann. It premiered in Berlin on 10 March 1921.

== Cast ==
- Marie Wismar as Frau Valevski
- Ernst Deutsch as Vikar Benedikt
- Kurt Vespermann as Karl
- Albert Steinrück as General Braticzek
- Maximiliane Ackers as Marie, Karls Braut
- John Gottowt as Wladislaus
- Lyda Salmonova as Mascha
- Geo Bergal as Heinrich
- Albert Bassermann
- Hugo Döblin
- Albrecht Viktor Blum

== Bibliography ==
- Grange, William. Cultural Chronicle of the Weimar Republic. Scarecrow Press, 2008.
