= 9th Venice International Film Festival =

Italian film festival in 1948

- Festival poster
- Location: Venice, Italy
- Founded: 1932
- Awards: Grand International Prize of Venice: Hamlet
- Festival date: 19 August – 4 September 1948
- Website: Website

Venice Film Festival chronology
- 10th 8th

The 9th annual Venice International Film Festival was held from 19 August to 4 September 1948.

Italian filmmaker Luigi Chiarini was the Jury President for the International Competition. The Grand International Prize of Venice was awarded to Hamlet by Laurence Olivier.

== Jury ==
- Luigi Chiarini, Italian filmmaker - Jury President
- Guido Aristarco, Italian film critic and author
- Alberto Consiglio
- Mario Gromo, Italian writer and film critic
- Arturo Lanocita
- Vinicio Marinucci
- Mario Melloni
- Andrew Félix Morlión
- Giorgio Prosperi, Italian screenwriter

== Official Sections ==
=== International Competition ===
English title	Original title	Director(s)	Production country
L'Amore	L'Amore	Roberto Rossellini	Italy
Difficult Years	Anni difficili	Luigi Zampa	Italy
A Double Life	A Double Life	George Cukor	United States
Duel in the Sun	Duel in the Sun	King Vidor	United States
The Fallen Idol	The Fallen Idol	Carol Reed	United Kingdom
The Fugitive	The Fugitive	John Ford	United States
God Bless You	Dios se lo pague	Luis César Amadori	Argentina
Hamlet	Hamlet	Laurence Olivier	United Kingdom
La Terra Trema	La Terra Trema	Luchino Visconti	Italy
Louisiana Story	Louisiana Story	Robert J. Flaherty	United States
Maclovia	Belleza Maldita	Emilio Fernández	Mexico
Oliver Twist	Oliver Twist	David Lean	United Kingdom
The Other Life	Das andere Leben	Rudolf Steinboeck	Austria
The Angel with the Trumpet	Der Engel mit der Posaune	Karl Hartl	Austria
The Treasure of the Sierra Madre	The Treasure of the Sierra Madre	John Huston	United States
The Trial	Der Prozeß	Georg Wilhelm Pabst	Austria
Under the Sun of Rome	Sotto il sole di Roma	Renato Castellani	Italy
Gold Smugglers	Passeurs d'or	Émile-Georges De Meyst	France / Belgium
The Crab with the Golden Claws	Le crabe aux pinces d'or	Claude Misonne	Belgium
The Angel's Coat	Andělský kabát	Eduard Hofman	Czechoslovakia
The Millionaire Who Stole the Sun	O milionáři, který ukradl slunce	Zdeněk Miler	Czechoslovakia
The Czech Year	Špalíček	Jiří Trnka	Czechoslovakia
Love and the Zeppelin	Vzducholoď a láska	Jiří Brdečka	Czechoslovakia
The Danish Village Church	Landsbykirken	Carl Theodor Dreyer	Denmark
Shaped by Danish Hands	Shaped by Danish Hands	Hagen Hasselbalch	Denmark
Chateaubriand: Combourg, Features of Stone	Combourg, visage de pierre	Jacques de Casembroot	France
Woman of Antwerp	Dédée d'Anvers	Yves Allégret	France
The Eagle with Two Heads	L'Aigle à deux têtes	Jean Cocteau	France
Operation Swallow: The Battle for Heavy Water	Kampen om tungtvannet	Jean Dréville; Titus Vibe-Müller	Norway; France
The Little Soldier	Le Petit Soldat	Paul Grimault	France
Wrack	Goémons	Yannick Bellon	France
Black Peasants	Les Paysans noirs	Georges Régnier	France
A Matter of Time	Une question d'heure	Victor Vicas	France
Auction Sale	Vente aux enchères	Jean Mousselle	France

== Official Awards ==
=== International Competition ===
- Grand International Prize of Venice: Hamlet by Laurence Olivier
- Best Italian Film: Under the Sun of Rome by Renato Castellani
- Silver Lion for Best Direction: Georg Wilhelm Pabst for The Trial
- Volpi Cup for Best Actor: Ernst Deutsch for The Trial
- Volpi Cup for Best Actress: Jean Simmons for Hamlet
- Best Original Screenplay: Graham Greene for The Fallen Idol
- Best Cinematography: Desmond Dickinson for Hamlet
- Best Original Music: Max Steiner for The Treasure of the Sierra Madre
- Outstanding Technical Contribution: John Bryan for Oliver Twist

== Independent Awards ==
=== International Award ===
- Louisiana Story for Robert J. Flaherty
- The Fugitive for John Ford
- La Terra Trema for Luchino Visconti

=== ANICA Cup ===
- Under the Sun of Rome by Renato Castellani

=== Cinecittà Cup ===
- Duel in the Sun for David O. Selznick

=== ENIC Cup ===
- Difficult Years for Luigi Zampa
