= Prisoner of Japan =

1942 film by Arthur Ripley

- Theatrical release poster
- Directed by: Arthur Ripley
- Screenplay by: Robert Chapin; Arthur Ripley
- Story by: Edgar G. Ulmer
- Produced by: Seymour Nebenzal
- Starring: Alan Baxter; Gertrude Michael; Ernst Deutsch; Corinna Mura; Tom Seidel; Billy Moya
- Cinematography: Jack Greenhalgh
- Edited by: Holbrook N. Todd
- Music by: Leo Erdody
- Production companies: Atlantis Pictures; Producers Releasing Corporation
- Distributed by: Producers Releasing Corporation
- Release date: July 22, 1942
- Running time: 64 minutes
- Country: United States
- Language: English

Prisoner of Japan is a 1942 American drama film directed by Arthur Ripley and written by Robert Chapin and Arthur Ripley. The film stars Alan Baxter, Gertrude Michael, Ernst Deutsch, Corinna Mura, Tom Seidel and Billy Moya. The film was released on July 22, 1942, by Producers Releasing Corporation.

== Plot ==
On a small tropical island in the South Pacific, David Bowman, a young American planter, finds himself pitted against a ruthless Japanese agent, Matsuru. Through Toni Chase, an American girl who runs a dance resort on the island, he learns that Matsuru has established a powerful and hidden short-wave radio station near his home. American ships have been attacked in that part of the Pacific with deadly effect.

== Cast ==
- Alan Baxter as David Bowman
- Gertrude Michael as Toni Chase
- Ernst Deutsch as Matsuru
- Corinna Mura as Loti
- Tom Seidel as Ens. Bailey
- Billy Moya as Maui
- Ray Bennett as Lt. Morgan
- Dave O'Brien as U.S. Marine
- Ann Staunton as Edie
- Beal Wong as Japanese Radio Operator
- Gil Frye as U.S. Radio Operator
- Kent Thurber as Cmdr. McDonald
