= Alan Baxter (actor) =

American actor (1908–1976)

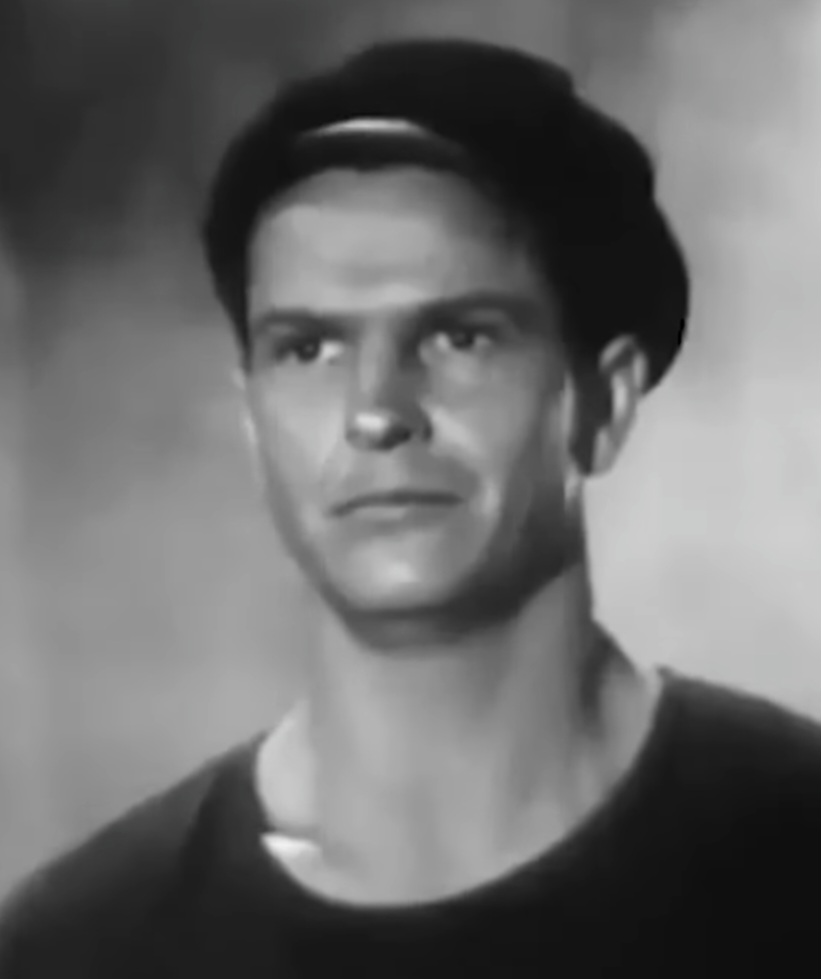
- Baxter in Submarine Base (1943)
- Born: November 19, 1908; East Cleveland, Ohio, U.S.
- Died: May 7, 1976 (aged 67); Woodland Hills, Los Angeles, California, U.S.
- Occupation: Actor
- Years active: 1935–1971
- Spouses: Barbara Williams (1936–1953) (her death); Christy Palmer (1955–1976) (his death)

Alan Edwin Baxter (November 19, 1908 – May 7, 1976) was an American film and television actor.

== Early years ==
Baxter was born in East Cleveland, Ohio. He earned a bachelor's degree from Williams College, where he was a member of Phi Sigma Kappa fraternity and a classmate of Elia Kazan. He went on to study in the 47 Drama Workshop at Yale University.

== Stage ==
After he completed his studies, Baxter became a member of the Group Theatre in New York City. His Broadway credits include The Hallams (1947), Home of the Brave (1945), The Voice of the Turtle (1943), Winged Victory (1943), Thumbs Up! (1934), and Lone Valley (1932).

== Military service ==
Baxter served in the United States Army Air Corps during World War II.

== Personal life ==
Baxter had been married to actress Barbara Williams for 17 years at the time of her death on November 9, 1953. Later, he was married to Christy Palmer until his death.

== Filmography ==
- Mary Burns, Fugitive (1935) – 'Babe' Wilson (film debut)
- The Trail of the Lonesome Pine (1936) – Clayt Tolliver
- Big Brown Eyes (1936) – Cary Butler
- Thirteen Hours by Air (1936) – Curtis Palmer
- The Case Against Mrs. Ames (1936) – Lou
- Parole! (1936) – Percy 'Okay' Smith
- Breezing Home (1937) – Joe Montgomery
- Wide Open Faces (1937) – Danny Haines
- Night Key (1937) – John Baron a.k.a. The Kid
- It Could Happen to You (1937) – Bob Ames
- The Last Gangster (1937) – Acey Kile
- Big Town Girl (1937) – James Mead
- I Met My Love Again (1938) – Tony
- Wide Open Faces (1938) – Tony
- Gangs of New York (1938) – 'Dapper' Mallare
- Off the Record (1939) – Joe Fallon
- Boy Slaves (1939) – Graff
- My Son Is a Criminal (1939) – Tim Halloran Jr.
- Let Us Live (1939) – Joe Linden
- Each Dawn I Die (1939) – Carlisle
- In Name Only (1939) – Charley
- Abe Lincoln in Illinois (1940) – Billy Herndon
- The Lone Wolf Strikes (1940) – Jim Ryder
- Free, Blonde and 21 (1940) – Mickey Ryan
- Escape to Glory (1940) – Larry Perrin, alias Larry Ross
- The Man Who Talked Too Much (1940) – Joe Garland
- Santa Fe Trail (1940) – Oliver Brown
- Under Age (1941) – Tap Manson
- Bad Men of Missouri (1941) – Jesse James
- Rags to Riches (1941) – Jimmy Rogers
- The Pittsburgh Kid (1941) – Joe Barton
- Shadow of the Thin Man (1941) – 'Whitey' Barrow
- Borrowed Hero (1941) – Roger Andrews
- Saboteur (1942) – Mr. Freeman
- Prisoner of Japan (1942) – David Bowman
- Stand By All Networks (1942) – Victor
- China Girl (1942) – Bill Jones
- The Human Comedy (1943) – Brad Stickman
- Behind Prison Walls (1943) – Jonathan MacGlennon
- Pilot No. 5 (1943) – Winston Davis
- Submarine Base (1943) – Joe Morgan
- Women in Bondage (1943) – Otto Bracken
- Winged Victory (1944) – Major Halper
- The Prairie (1947) – Paul Hover
- Close-Up (1948) – Phil Sparr
- The Set-Up (1949) – Little Boy
- She Shoulda Said No! (1949) – Markey
- The True Story of Jesse James (1957) – Barney Remington
- The End of the Line (1957) – Mike Selby
- The Restless Years (1958) – Alex Fisher
- The Restless Gun (1958) as George Frazier in Episode "The Torn Flag"
- Face of a Fugitive (1959) – Reed Williams
- Alfred Hitchcock Presents (1960) (Season 5 Episode 18: "Backward, Turn Backward") - Sheriff Andy Willetts
- The Mountain Road (1960) – General Loomis
- Judgment at Nuremberg (1961) – Brigadier General Matt Merrin
- The Alfred Hitchcock Hour (1965) (Season 3 Episode 12: "Crimson Witness") - Mr. Baldwin
- This Property Is Condemned (1966) – Knopke
- Assault on a Queen (1966) – Larry, Crewman (uncredited)
- Welcome to Hard Times (1967) – Jack Millay
- Paint Your Wagon (1969) – Mr. Fenty
- Chisum (1970) – Governor Sam Axtell
- Willard (1971) – Walter T. Spencer
- Escape from the Planet of the Apes (1971) – Military Officer (uncredited)

== Television roles ==
Among Baxter's television appearances were four guest roles on the CBS' courtroom drama series, Perry Mason. In 1961, he played the title role of Eugene Houseman in "The Case of the Left-Handed Liar". Also in 1961 Gunsmoke “Long, Long Trail” he played Lou Hacker and Maverick “Flood's Folly” he played Judge John Scott. In 1964, he played Roger Gray in “The Case of the Missing Button”. He also made three guest appearances on The Virginian, and he was guest starred on Ripcord, as Leach in the episode "Derelict". In September 1960, he appeared in the season premiere episode "The Longest Rope" of the western series Cheyenne. In 1961 he appeared on Thriller in the season 2, episode “Waxworks” playing Sergeant Dane. In 1963 he appeared as “Ab” in the “Lover Boy” episode of Gunsmoke. He also played Detective Baldwin on Alfred Hitchcock Hour in “The Crimson Witness”. In 1963, he played Colonel Grover in the episode O.B.I.T. on The Outer Limits.
