= The Last of Mrs. Cheyney (1929 film) =

1929 film

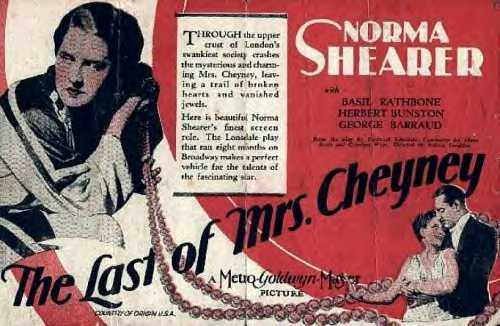
- Theatrical film herald
- Directed by: Sidney Franklin
- Written by: Hans Kraly; Claudine West
- Based on: The Last of Mrs. Cheyney; 1925 play by Frederick Lonsdale
- Produced by: Irving Thalberg (uncredited)
- Starring: Norma Shearer; Basil Rathbone
- Cinematography: William H. Daniels
- Edited by: Conrad A. Nervig
- Music by: William Axt
- Production company: Metro-Goldwyn-Mayer
- Release date: July 26, 1929
- Running time: 94 minutes
- Country: United States
- Language: English

The Last of Mrs. Cheyney is a 1929 American pre-Code comedy-drama film directed by Sidney Franklin. The screenplay by Hanns Kräly is based on the 1925 play of the same name by Frederick Lonsdale which ran on Broadway for 385 performances. The film was remade twice, with the same title in 1937 and as The Law and the Lady in 1951.

The film's sets were designed by the resident MGM art director Cedric Gibbons.

== Plot ==
The Last of Mrs. Cheyney (1929)

Resourceful and engaging Fay Cheyney, posing as a wealthy Australian widow at a Monte Carlo hotel, befriends Mrs. Webley with the intention of stealing her pearl necklace, a plot devised by Charles, her butler and partner-in-crime. Complicating the situation are the romantic feelings she develops for Lord Arthur Dilling, Mrs. Webley's nephew. While taking the necklace during a party in the Webley home, Fay is caught by Arthur, who threatens to expose her unless she submits to him. Rather than compromise her principles, she confesses to her hostess, who plans to contact the police until Lord Elton, another guest, recalls Fay has a love letter he wrote her that could prove to be embarrassing to everyone present. They offer her money in exchange for the letter and her freedom, but when she destroys the letter and refuses their payment, they welcome her back into their social circle.

== Cast ==
- Norma Shearer as Fay Cheyney
- Basil Rathbone as Lord Arthur Dilling
- George Barraud as Charles
- Herbert Bunston as Lord Elton
- Hedda Hopper as Lady Maria
- Maude Turner Gordon as Mrs. Webley
- Moon Carroll as Joan
- Madeline Seymour as Mrs. Wynton
- Cyril Chadwick as Willie Wynton
- George K. Arthur as George
- Frank Finch Smiles as William

== Critical reception ==
Mordaunt Hall of The New York Times said, "It is a well-arranged picture, but nevertheless one in which it is not difficult to detect where Mr. Lonsdale left off and where the scenario writers tried their hand at dialogue . . . There are a number of interesting dramatic passages that are pictured with considerable cunning. The dialogue goes on for some time, and Sidney Franklin, the director, keeps his players busy, which is a relief after seeing talking screen images standing in the same spot until they have had their say."

Edwin Schallert of the Los Angeles Times observed, "In the portrayals, Miss Shearer averaged well. She evidences a more precise expressiveness facially than she does vocally, and some of her very best scenes are in the silent ones. Nevertheless, she measures very well to the majority of the role’s requirements, the crispness of her voice being well suited to the repartee portions. She is exceedingly attractive in the role."

== Awards and honors ==
Screenwriter Hanns Kräly was nominated twice for the Academy Award for Best Writing at the 2nd Academy Awards, for this film and The Patriot, winning for the latter.

== See also ==
- List of early sound feature films (1926–1929)
