= The Law and the Lady (1951 film) =

1951 film by Edwin H. Knopf

- Directed by: Edwin H. Knopf
- Screenplay by: Leonard Spigelgass; Karl Tunberg
- Based on: The Last of Mrs. Cheyney; 1925 play by Frederick Lonsdale
- Produced by: Edwin H. Knopf
- Starring: Greer Garson; Fernando Lamas; Michael Wilding
- Cinematography: George J. Folsey
- Edited by: William B. Gulick; James E. Newcom
- Music by: Carmen Dragon
- Distributed by: Metro-Goldwyn-Mayer
- Release dates: July 19, 1951; August 17, 1951 (New York)
- Running time: 104 minutes
- Country: United States
- Language: English
- Budget: $1,193,000
- Box office: $1,360,000

The Law and the Lady is a 1951 American comedy film directed by Edwin H. Knopf and starring Greer Garson, Michael Wilding (as twin brothers) and Fernando Lamas. The script is loosely based on the 1925 play The Last of Mrs. Cheyney by Frederick Lonsdale. The film is the third film adaptation of Lonsdale's play, preceded by 1929 and 1937 films titled The Last of Mrs. Cheyney.

== Plot ==
Jane Hoskins is a handmaiden employed by Lord Minden and his haughty wife Lady Sybil Minden. Lord Minden's younger twin brother Nigel Duxbury received only a small fraction of his brother's share of the family fortune because his brother was born just five minutes earlier than he. Having squandered his money, Nigel sneaks into his brother's home and steals Lady Minden's earrings. Lady Minden accuses Jane of the theft until Nigel claims responsibility. Angry at the false accusation, Jane quits her job.

Nigel is impressed by Jane's attitude and shares an evening of fine dining with her. They unintentionally cause a wealthy man to believe that Jane is a wealthy widow, the Lady Lovely, and that she collects donations for a fictional Egyptian charity called The Nile Fund. After receiving £100 from the man, Jane and Nigel agree to work together as confidence tricksters.

Jane and Nigel travel to Monte Carlo, Sanremo and Shanghai, where they cheat at gambling and are asked to leave each country. In San Francisco, Nigel suggests that they focus on jewelry theft. Nigel takes a job as a butler at the house of society queen Julia Wortin, whom Jane befriends. Jane is invited to the Wortin home as a guest. Jane and Nigel plot to steal Julia's diamond necklace. Julia throws a party in Jane's honor, and her exotic neighbor Juan begins to woo Jane, causing Nigel to become jealous. Jane locates Julia's safe and the necklace within, but she is touched by Julia's kindness to her and cannot allow herself to steal the necklace.

The following day, Jane accepts a marriage proposal from Juan. Jane and Nigel argue about her decision, and although they share a kiss, they are reluctant to admit their feelings for one another, having long ago agreed that theirs was a strictly business relationship.

Jane steals the necklace and gives it to Nigel because she is worried about his future now that she will no longer be his partner. Juan sees her give the necklace to Nigel and has already discovered that she is not really Lady Lovely. Juan and his servant apprehend Nigel, and Juan forces himself into Jane's room, where she activates the burglar alarm. Realizing that Juan is not going to betray her, Jane reveals to Julia that she is a thief. Nigel appears with a letter from another of Julia's house guests that contains libelous information with which he and Jane can blackmail Julia and her guests if they inform the police. The guests bid for ownership of the letter, but Jane gives it to Juan. Julia asks Jane and Nigel to remain at her home.

The following morning, after fighting over Jane the previous night, Juan and Nigel inform Jane that they agree that Juan should win her hand. Jane reveals her true love for Nigel by berating him for conceding to Juan and revealing that she has always loved him but that he was "too stupid to know it". Juan withdraws gracefully and Jane and Nigel resolve to end their criminal careers and repay everyone from whom they have stolen.

Just as Jane and Nigel are about to leave, the sheriff and an inspector from Scotland Yard appear and reveal that Lord Minden has died and that Nigel now receives the fortune. However, Nigel and Jane are arrested for their initial £100 deception and must serve a short prison term.

== Cast ==
- Greer Garson as Jane Hoskins
- Michael Wilding as Nigel Duxbury and Lord Minden
- Fernando Lamas as Juan Dinas
- Marjorie Main as Julia Wortin
- Hayden Rorke as Tracy Collans
- Margalo Gillmore as Cora Caighn
- Ralph Dumke as James Horace Caighn
- Rhys Williams as Inspector McGraw
- Phyllis Stanley as Lady Sybil Minden
- Natalie Schafer as Pamela Pemberson
- Bess Flowers as Mrs. Bruno Thayer
- Holmes Herbert as English Colonel
- Stuart Holmes as Mr. Bruno Thayer
- Matt Moore as Senator Scholmm
- Anna Q. Nilsson as Mrs. Scholmm
- Jean Del Val as Dealer (uncredited)
- Lester Dorr as Newspaperman (uncredited)

== Production ==
The story is very loosely based on the 1925 play The Last of Mrs. Cheyney by Frederick Lonsdale, with several significant changes. The era is transferred to the turn of the century, the names are changed and the first half of the film shows the history of the two thieves. Previous film versions of the story in 1929 (starring Norma Shearer) and 1937 (starring Joan Crawford) retained the play's contemporary setting, included a crew of confederates and opened with Mrs. Cheyney as an established figure in society. The ending of The Law and the Lady also differs from that of the play, with the two main characters ending as romantic partners but returning to England to face justice for their first swindle.

The film is not related to the 1875 Wilkie Collins novel The Law and the Lady.

Greer Garson's dress worn during the party scene contained 150,000 bugle beads and 14,000 sequins, sewn by four seamstresses over the course of 145 hours. After the film was completed, the dress was exhibited throughout the country.

== Reception ==
In a contemporary review for The New York Times, critic A. H. Weiler wrote: "Metro, to put matters in a nutshell, does not have the sturdy offering one would imagine. For the vehicle ... is a slow one. And the barbed and witty lines of the author seem to have lost their gaiety and brilliance through the script of Leonard Spigelgass and Karl Tunberg. Mr. Lonsdale's format was a pleasing one. His idea of pairing a ne'er-do-well British gentleman and a bright, beautiful but low-born lady in a career of genteel crime is still intriguing. But the cheerful expectancy with which one awaits the unfolding of the plot once he notes the foreword—'it is the turn of the century—if they would have known what was ahead they would never have turned it"—is considerably dampened by what ensues."

According to MGM, the film earned $563,000 in the U.S. and Canada and $797,000 elsewhere, resulting in a loss of $395,000.

== See also ==
- The Last of Mrs. Cheyney (1929 film), starring Norma Shearer
- The Last of Mrs. Cheyney (1937 film), starring Joan Crawford
