= Kohlhiesel's Daughters =

Kohlhiesel's Daughters (German:Kohlhiesels Töchter) may refer to:

- Kohlhiesel's Daughters (play), a play by Hanns Kräly, which was adapted to film numerous times:
  - Kohlhiesels Töchter (1920 film), a silent German film directed by Ernst Lubitsch
  - Kohlhiesel's Daughters (1930 film), a German film directed by Hans Behrendt
  - Kohlhiesel's Daughters (1943 film), a German film directed by Kurt Hoffmann
  - Kohlhiesel's Daughters (1962 film), a West German film directed by Axel von Ambesser
