= The Last of Mrs. Cheyney (play) =

1925 play by Frederick Lonsdale

Scene from 1925 London production, with Gladys Cooper and Gerald du Maurier

Lord Elton's unfortunate letter

The Last of Mrs. Cheyney is a 1925 comedy by the English playwright Frederick Lonsdale. A popular success in London and New York, it has been adapted four times as a film and revived on stage. It depicts a high society hostess – who is secretly a jewel thief – and the attempts by two aristocrats to woo her.

== History ==
The play opened at the St James's Theatre, London on 22 September 1925, directed by Gerald du Maurier, and ran for 514 performances, and at the Fulton Theatre, New York, on 9 November 1925, directed by Winchell Smith, running for 385 performances. The play was revived at the Savoy Theatre, London on 15 June 1944, directed by Tyrone Guthrie, and subsequently toured the provinces until May 1945.

Role	London, 1925	New York, 1925	London, 1944
Lord Dilling	Gerald du Maurier	Roland Young	Jack Buchanan
Lord Elton	Dawson Milward	Felix Aylmer	Austin Trevor
Charles, a butler	Ronald Squire	A. E. Matthews	James Dale
Hon Willie Wynton	Basil Loder	Lionel Pope	Anthony Shaw
William, a footman	Guy Fletcher	Henry Mowbray	Cyril Renison
George, a footman	Frank Lawton	Alfred Ayre	Bryan Matheson
Jim, a chauffeur	E. H. Paterson	Edwin Taylor	Jack Leopold
Roberts, Mrs Ebley's butler	A. Harding Steerman	Leslie Palmer	Douglas Herald
Mrs Cheyney	Gladys Cooper	Ina Claire	Coral Browne
Maria, Lady Frinton	Ellis Jeffreys	Helen Haye	Athene Seyler
Mrs Ebley, cousin to Lord Dilling	May Whitty	Winifred Harris	Margaret Scudamore
Lady Mary Sindley	Violet Campbell	Audrey Thompson	Anne Firth
Hon Mrs Wynton	Mabel Sealby	Mabel Buckley	Madge Compton
Lady Joan Houghton	Gladys Gray	Nancy Ryan	Frances Rowe

A production directed by Nigel Patrick was presented at the Chichester Festival in May and June 1980, and subsequently toured, before opening in the West End at the Cambridge Theatre in October. The Chichester cast included Simon Williams (Lord Dilling), Christopher Gable (Lord Elton), Benjamin Whitrow (Charles), Joan Collins (Mrs Cheyney), Moyra Fraser (Lady Frinton) and Elspeth March (Mrs Ebley). For the tour and London run James Villiers took over as Lord Elton and Michael Aldridge as Charles.

== Synopsis ==
Programme for 1925 West End production

The first act is set in Mrs Cheyney's country house in Goring-on-Thames. A charity garden party in the grounds comes to a conclusion and Mrs Cheyney enters her drawing room. Her butler and other domestic staff make themselves comfortable there and do not treat her with deference. It emerges that she and they are members of a criminal gang, and that they have their eye on a particularly valuable necklace to be worn by Mrs Ebley at a house party to which Mrs Cheyney has been invited. Among the guests at the garden party are Lords Dilling and Elton. Both are much attracted to Mrs Cheyney, believing her story that she is the widow of a rich Australian and has settled in England (she is in fact a former shop-girl from Clapham). Dilling is intelligent but dissolute; Elton is rich and stupid.

In the second and third acts, set at Mrs Ebley's house party, both Elton and Dilling pursue Mrs Cheyney. Dilling gets her into his room at night and tells her he will keep her there until they are found in the morning, but she does not yield to this blackmail. Her own criminal purpose emerges, and there is much talk of her being sent to prison, but Elton vetoes the idea because he has sent her a proposal of marriage in a letter that also contains his candid and unflattering views of all his fellow guests; all are agreed that its contents must never be widely known. The impasse is not resolved by Elton's offer of a huge sum of money to buy the letter back, as Mrs Cheyney tears up both his cheque and the letter. She and Dilling gradually establish a rapport and she agrees to marry him and leave her criminal past behind her.

== Reception ==
Lonsdale's friend P. G. Wodehouse wrote to another friend:

What is plagiarism? Did you ever see a play by Freddie Lonsdale called The Last of Mrs Cheyney? It was about a society woman who was one of a band of crooks, and this is revealed to the audience at the end of Act I. An exactly similar situation was in an American play called Cheating Cheaters. And the big scene of Act Two was where the hero gets Mrs Cheyney into his room at night and holds her up by saying he is going to keep her there till they are found in the morning, which is exactly the same as Pinero's Gay Lord Quex. And yet nobody has ever breathed a word against Freddie for plagiarizing. Quite rightly. The treatment is everything.

The drama critic James Agate also commented on the resemblance of the bedroom scene to that in Pinero's play: "Who, when the mauvais garçon offered the lady choice between five years in gaol and a night of gallantry, could doubt again that she would throw the rest of the champagne in Quex's face and ring Sophy Fulgarney's bell?" Agate's judgement of the piece was "It is not a good sort of play, but it is a very good play of its sort".

Reviewing the 1980 Chichester revival, The Stage commented that fifty-five years "is either too long or too short a time in the history of the play of style"; and classed the new production as an example:

Written with the St James's Theatre and the du Maurier management in mind, Lonsdale's play is in the Pinero tradition with a fine lacing of Wildean epigram and arguably it needs the taut discipline of a traditional proscenium arch to be as effective as Patrick Lau's production deserves to be.

The reviewer added that although the play is not on the same dramatic level as the best of Wilde or Coward, "it makes an evening of pleasure ... One is not surprised that 'house full' notices are already in evidence".

== Film adaptations ==
The first film version of The Last of Mrs. Cheyney was released in 1929 in the United States, starring Norma Shearer and Basil Rathbone. A second film adaptation of the same name was released in 1937, starring Joan Crawford, William Powell, Robert Montgomery, Benita Hume and Frank Morgan. The final American film version of the Lonsdale play starred Greer Garson and was titled The Law and the Lady (1951). A German film version was released as The Last of Mrs. Cheyney (1961), starring Lilli Palmer.

== Sources ==
- Agate, James (1944). Red Letter Nights: A Survey of the Post-Elizabethan Drama in Actual Performance on the London Stage, 1921–1943. London: Jonathan Cape. OCLC 2173693.
- Herbert, Ian, ed. (1972). Who's Who in the Theatre (fifteenth ed.). London: Sir Isaac Pitman and Sons. ISBN 978-0-273-31528-5.
- Wodehouse, P. G. (1980). "Performing Flea". Wodehouse on Wodehouse. London: Hutchinson. ISBN 978-0-09-143210-2.
