= The Last of Mrs. Cheyney (1937 film) =

1937 film by Dorothy Arzner, Richard Boleslawski, George Fitzmaurice

- Original film poster
- Directed by: Richard Boleslawski; Dorothy Arzner (uncredited); George Fitzmaurice (uncredited)
- Written by: Leon Gordon; Samson Raphaelson; Monckton Hoffe
- Based on: The Last of Mrs. Cheyney; 1925 play by Frederick Lonsdale
- Produced by: Lawrence Weingarten
- Starring: Joan Crawford; William Powell; Robert Montgomery; Frank Morgan
- Cinematography: George J. Folsey
- Edited by: Frank Sullivan
- Music by: William Axt
- Production company: Metro-Goldwyn-Mayer
- Distributed by: Loew's Inc.
- Release date: February 19, 1937
- Running time: 98 minutes
- Country: United States
- Language: English
- Budget: $741,000
- Box office: $1,797,000

The Last of Mrs. Cheyney is a 1937 American comedy drama film adapted from the 1925 Frederick Lonsdale play The Last of Mrs. Cheyney. The film tells the story of a chic jewel thief in England, who falls in love with one of her marks.

The movie stars Joan Crawford, William Powell, Robert Montgomery and Frank Morgan. When director Richard Boleslawski died suddenly in the middle of production, George Fitzmaurice took over, and when he became ill, the film was completed by Dorothy Arzner. Both Fitzmaurice and Arzner were uncredited.

Two other versions of the story were made: The Last of Mrs. Cheyney (1929), starring Norma Shearer, and The Law and the Lady (1951), starring Greer Garson.

== Plot ==
Lord Francis Kelton finds a beautiful woman in his stateroom. He is flustered, but his playboy friend, Lord Arthur Dilling, is fascinated by her. He finds out from the ship's purser that she is American widow Fay Cheyney on her way to stay in England. In London, she becomes the darling of English society, impressing everyone, including Arthur's wealthy aunt, the Duchess of Ebley, who invites her to stay with her for the weekend. Arthur tries to impress Fay, but is rejected by her, even though she is becoming attracted to him.

After a charity auction at Fay's house, her "servants" look forward to a profitable future, but Charles, her butler, suggests that she may be more fond of Arthur than she pretends. Fay and her servants are really confidence operators who are planning a jewel robbery, using Fay as their front. At the duchess' country home, she suggests to Fay that Arthur, who usually acts like a cad, is really in love with her, but Fay shrugs off her words. After Lord Kelton makes a bungled attempt to propose to her, Fay sneaks into the duchess' room and attempts to steal her pearl necklace, but is interrupted by a maid. Before she can resume, Arthur also interrupts and proposes. In London, the servants worry about Fay's lack of success, while in the country Fay learns how to get into the duchess' safe, but finds it difficult to think of robbing her because of her kindness.

Soon Charles arrives, but tells Fay that she can't get out of the plan now because of the others. Before he leaves, she decides to continue, even though Charles offers to face the others himself, and tells him that she will signal him when she has the duchess' pearls. Arthur sees Charles sneaking around the grounds and tries to have him stay the night, suspecting that he has seen Charles somewhere before, but Charles leaves. Later, when Fay steals the pearls, Arthur confronts her before she can throw them down to her friends, after remembering that he recognized Charles from an incident the previous year on the Riviera. He tries to blackmail her into spending the night with him, but she refuses, saying that she has never done that before. She then rings the alarm, rousing the entire household. He tries to take the blame, saying he acted like a cad, but she produces the pearls and tells them all the truth.

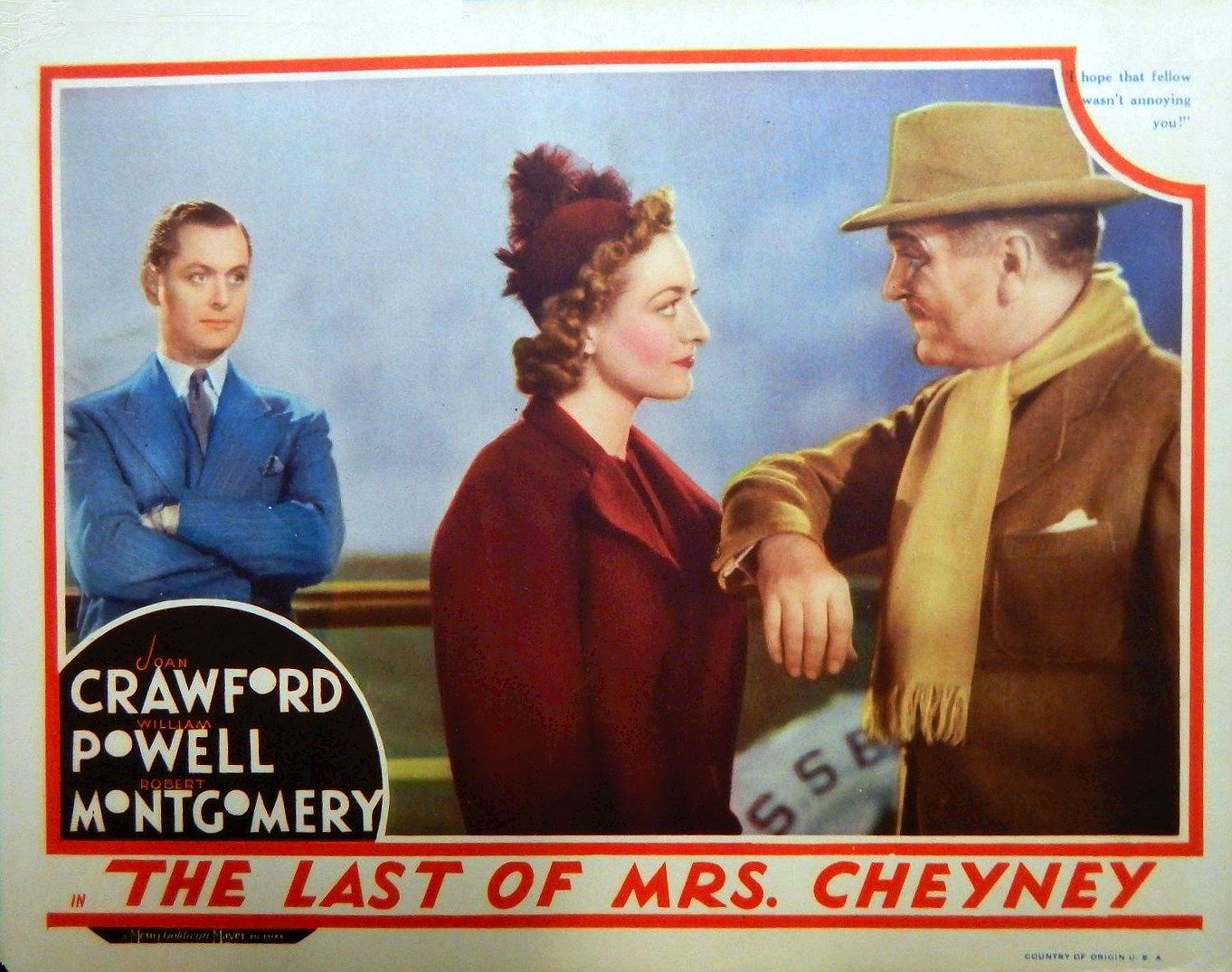
Lobby card

When Charles arrives, he summons the police, using Arthur's name, and they wait for Inspector Witherspoon of Scotland Yard's arrival the next morning. At breakfast, Arthur reveals that a letter that Lord Kelton wrote to Fay describing his friends may have to be used in court. Though at first amused, they are shocked when they learn that Kelton has written the unexpurgated truth about all of them. Kelton then suggests that they offer to pay Fay's passage back to America in exchange for not revealing the letter's contents. Fay, however, finds the offer too "dishonorable," until Kelton finally offers £10,000. She has destroyed the letter already, though, and will not take the money. In gratitude, Kelton offers to set Fay up with a modiste shop and the others offer to be her clients, but she again refuses. Though she wants Charles to stay, he declines, saying that he would have to remain honest if he stayed with her.

After offering to return Arthur's watch, which he stole five years before, Charles goes with Inspector Witherspoon, leaving Fay ignorant of the fact that he has turned himself in. When everyone has gone, Arthur says that he has arranged for them to be married by a neighboring bishop that morning, marking the last of Mrs. Cheyney and the first of Lady Dilling.

== Cast ==
- Joan Crawford as Mrs. Fay Cheyney
- William Powell as Charles
- Robert Montgomery as Lord Arthur Dilling
- Frank Morgan as Lord Francis Kelton
- Jessie Ralph as The Duchess of Ebley
- Nigel Bruce as Lord Willie Winton
- Phyllis Clare credited "Colleen Clare" as Joan
- Benita Hume as Lady Kitty Winton
- Ralph Forbes as Cousin John Clayborn
- Aileen Pringle as Maria
- Melville Cooper as William 'Bill'
- Leonard Carey as Ames, the Duchess' butler
- Sara Haden as Anna
- Lumsden Hare as Inspector Witherspoon
- Wallis Clark as George
- Barnett Parker as Purser

== Reception ==
Marguerite Tazelaar in the New York Herald Tribune wrote "Joan Crawford as Mrs. Cheyney was competent, besides giving the part considerable sympathy...The picture has been staged handsomely, the musical score accompanying it is good, and the lines glitter."

== Box office ==
The film grossed a total of $1,797,000: $1,107,000 from the U.S. and Canada and $690,000 in other markets. It made a profit of $460,000.
