= Achtung =

Achtung may refer to:

- Achtung, a German word meaning "attention"
- Achtung! – Auto-Diebe!, a crime film from 1930
- Achtung Baby, a 1991 album by U2
- Achtung Bono, a 2005 album by Half Man Half Biscuit
- Achtung, fertig, Charlie!, a 2003 Swiss film
- Achtung Jackass, a 2002 album by The Frustrators
- Achtung – Panzer!, a 1937 book by Heinz Guderian
- Achtung, die Kurve!, also known as Curve Fever, a computer game
- Achtung Spitfire!, a computer game released by Avalon Hill
