= The Blue Dragon =

1919 film directed by Harry Piel

- Directed by: Harry Piel
- Written by: Richard Hutter; Harry Piel; Josef Stöckler
- Produced by: Joe May
- Cinematography: Max Lutze
- Production company: May-Film
- Release date: April 1919
- Country: Germany
- Languages: Silent; German intertitles

The Blue Dragon (German: Der blaue Drachen) is a 1919 German silent film directed by Harry Piel. It features the popular detective character Joe Deebs.

== Cast ==
- Paul Bildt
- Heinrich Schroth as Joe Deebs

== Bibliography ==
- Thomas, Douglas B. (1999). The Early History of German Motion Pictures, 1895–1935. Washington, DC: Thomas International. ISBN 978-0-9612128-1-0.
