= Muff =

Muff or MUFF may refer to:

== Clothing ==
- Muff (handwarmer), a fashion accessory, usually of fur, for keeping the hands warm
  - Earmuffs, a device for protecting the ears

== Places ==
- Muff, former name of Eglinton, County Londonderry
- Muff, County Donegal, Ireland
- Muff, Pennsylvania, an unincorporated community in the United States

== People ==
- André Muff (born 1981), Swiss footballer
- George Muff, 1st Baron Calverley (1877–1955), British politician
- Thomas Harold Broadbent Maufe (1898–1942), British Army officer awarded the Victoria Cross (last name changed from Muff in 1909)
- Werner Muff (born 1974), Swiss equestrian
- Wolfgang Muff (1880–1947), German World War II general
- Muff Winwood (born 1943), English songwriter and record producer

== Other uses ==
- The Muff, a 1919 German silent film
- Melbourne Underground Film Festival
- Muff Potter, a character in The Adventures of Tom Sawyer and associated works
- Hans Muff, one of the companions of Saint Nicholas
- Muffed punt, in gridiron football, the act of touching a punted ball before possessing it
- Muff (chicken), a mutation found in chickens, which causes extra feathering under the chicken's face
- Muff, a method of making stained glass
- Slang term for the human vulva
- Muffing, a sex act involving the inguinal canals

== See also ==
- Muf (disambiguation)
- The Muffs, an American punk rock band
  - The Muffs (album), the band's 1993 debut album
- Yochanan Muffs (1932–2009), American-Jewish professor of the Bible and religion
