= Demon Blood =

1920 film

- Directed by: Fred Sauer
- Written by: Fred Sauer; Conrad Tietze
- Produced by: Conrad Tietze
- Cinematography: Heinrich Gärtner
- Production company: Macht-Film Conrad Tietze
- Distributed by: Odeon Filmvertrieb
- Release date: 1920
- Country: Germany
- Languages: Silent; German intertitles

Demon Blood (German: Dämon Blut) is a 1920 German silent horror film directed by Fred Sauer.

== Cast ==
In alphabetical order

- Emil Biron
- Ernst Dernburg
- Käthe Haack
- Aenderly Lebius
- Nien Soen Ling
- Frederic Nay
- Heinrich Peer
- Max Ruhbeck
- Fred Sauer
- Heinrich Schroth
- Emmy Sturm

== Bibliography ==
- Rolf Giesen. The Nosferatu Story: The Seminal Horror Film, Its Predecessors and Its Enduring Legacy. McFarland, 2019.
