= Rivalen =

Rivalen may refer to:

- The German language title of the 1923 film Rivals (1923 film), directed by and starring Harry Piel
- USS Rivalen (SP-63), a vessel of the US Navy in service 1917-1919
