= Diplomats (film) =

1918 film directed by Harry Piel

- Directed by: Harry Piel
- Written by: Harry Piel; Richard Hutter
- Produced by: Joe May
- Cinematography: Max Lutze
- Production company: May-Film
- Release date: December 1918
- Country: Germany
- Languages: Silent; German intertitles

Diplomats (German: Diplomaten) is a 1918 German silent film directed by Harry Piel. It features the detective Joe Deebs.

== Cast ==
- Max Ruhbeck
- Heinrich Schroth as Joe Deebs

== Bibliography ==
- Bock, Hans-Michael; Lenssen, Claudia, eds. (1991). Joe May: Regisseur und Produzent. Munich: Edition Text + Kritik. ISBN 978-3-88377-394-0.
