= The Demon of Kolno =

1921 film

- Directed by: Hanna Henning
- Written by: Hanna Henning; Fritz Skowronneck (novel)
- Produced by: Arthur Müller
- Starring: Max Ruhbeck; Sadjah Gezza; Ernst Dernburg
- Cinematography: Charles Paulus
- Production company: Doktram-Film
- Release date: 6 May 1921
- Country: Germany
- Languages: Silent; German intertitles

The Demon of Kolno (German: Der Dämon von Kolno) is a 1921 German silent film directed by Hanna Henning and starring Max Ruhbeck, Sadjah Gezza, and Ernst Dernburg.

The film's art direction was by Julian Ballenstedt.

== Cast ==
- Max Ruhbeck as Landgraf Stroganoff
- Sadjah Gezza as Serafine ALexandrowna, seine Frau
- Ernst Dernburg as Kolokotronski
- Kurt Ehrle as Juri Durowno
- Robert Leffler as Wnuk, der alte Schleusenwärter
- Toni Zimmerer as Ivan Piotrowitsch
- Albert Patry as Major von Adlersfeld
- Celly de Rheydt as Tänzein

== Bibliography ==
- Nelmes, Jill; Selbo, Jule, eds. (2015). Women Screenwriters: An International Guide. Basingstoke: Palgrave Macmillan. ISBN 978-1-137-31237-2.
