= A Night's Adventure =

1923 film directed by Harry Piel

- Directed by: Harry Piel
- Written by: Max Bauer
- Produced by: Harry Piel; Heinrich Nebenzahl
- Starring: Harry Piel; Lissy Arna
- Cinematography: Georg Muschner
- Release date: 1 June 1923
- Country: Germany
- Languages: Silent; German intertitles

A Night's Adventure (German: Abenteuer einer Nacht) is a 1923 German silent thriller film directed by and starring Harry Piel.

The film's sets were designed by the art director Kurt Richter.

== Cast ==
- Harry Piel
- Lissy Arna
- Friedrich Kühne
- Fred Immler
- Albert Bassermann

== Bibliography ==
- Grange, William. Cultural Chronicle of the Weimar Republic. Scarecrow Press, 2008.
