= The Lost House (1922 film) =

1922 film directed by Harry Piel

- Directed by: Harry Piel
- Written by: Lothar Knud Frederik
- Produced by: Harry Piel
- Starring: Harry Piel
- Cinematography: Georg Muschner
- Production company: Harry Piel Film
- Release date: 24 February 1922
- Country: Germany
- Languages: Silent; German intertitles

The Lost House (German: Das verschwundene Haus) is a 1922 German silent adventure film directed by and starring Harry Piel.

== Cast ==
In alphabetical order

- Maria Asti
- Charly Berger
- Umberto Guarracino
- Erner Huebsch
- Gottfried Kraus
- Albert Paulig
- Hermann Picha
- Harry Piel
- Karl Platen
- Fritz Rasp
- Frida Richard
- Friedrich Robert
- Emmy Sturm
- Gaby Ungar

== Bibliography ==
- Matias Bleckman. Harry Piel: ein Kino-Mythos und seine Zeit. Filminstitut der Landeshaupstadt Düsseldorf, 1992.
