= The Last Battle (1923 film) =

1923 film directed by Harry Piel

- Directed by: Harry Piel
- Written by: Victor Abel; Harry Piel; Alfred Zeisler
- Produced by: Heinrich Nebenzahl; Harry Piel; Louis Zimmerman
- Starring: Harry Piel; Charly Berger; Karl Platen
- Cinematography: Georg Muschner
- Production company: Apex Film
- Release date: 23 March 1923
- Country: Germany
- Languages: Silent; German intertitles

The Last Battle (German: Der letzte Kampf) is a 1923 German silent film directed by and starring Harry Piel.

The film's sets were designed by the art director Hermann Warm.

== Cast ==
- Harry Piel
- Charly Berger
- Inge Helgard
- Adolf Klein
- Karl Platen

== Bibliography ==
- Bock, Hans-Michael & Bergfelder, Tim. The Concise CineGraph. Encyclopedia of German Cinema. Berghahn Books, 2009.
