= The Sultan of Johore =

- Directed by: Harry Piel
- Written by: Harry Piel
- Produced by: Paul Davidson
- Production company: PAGU
- Release date: December 1917
- Country: Germany
- Languages: Silent; German intertitles

The Sultan of Johore (German: Der Sultan von Johore) is a 1917 German silent film directed by Harry Piel.

== Cast ==
- Tilly Bébé
- Aruth Wartan

== Bibliography ==
- Matias Bleckman. Harry Piel: ein Kino-Mythos und seine Zeit. Filminstitut der Landeshaupstadt Düsseldorf, 1992.
