= The Rolling Hotel =

- Directed by: Harry Piel
- Written by: Harry Piel; Richard Hutter; Eric Kay
- Produced by: Joe May
- Cinematography: Max Lutze
- Production company: May-Film
- Distributed by: UFA
- Release date: 27 September 1918
- Country: Germany
- Languages: Silent; German intertitles

The Rolling Hotel (German: Das rollende Hotel) is a 1918 German silent film directed by Harry Piel. It is one of a number of films featuring the detective character Joe Deebs.

== Cast ==
- Heinrich Schroth as Joe Deebs
- Käthe Haack
- Wilhelm Diegelmann
- Stefan Vacano

== Bibliography ==
- Hans-Michael Bock & Claudia Lenssen. Joe May: Regisseur und Produzent. 1991.
