= Ernst Dernburg =

German actor (1887–1969)

- Born: Erich Wilhelm Franz Hermann Calow; 4 April 1887; Halle (Saale), German Empire
- Died: 23 September 1969 (aged 82); West Berlin, West Germany
- Occupation: Actor
- Years active: 1913–1952

Ernst Dernburg (born Erich Wilhelm Franz Hermann Calow; 4 April 1887 – 23 September 1969) was a German stage and film actor.

== Selected filmography ==
- The Sacrifice (1918)
- The Living Dead (1919)
- The Marquise of Armiani (1920)
- Demon Blood (1920)
- Indian Revenge (1921)
- The Flight into Death (1921)
- The Demon of Kolno (1921)
- Sunken Worlds (1922)
- The Love Story of Cesare Ubaldi (1922)
- Hannele's Journey to Heaven (1922)
- I.N.R.I. (1923)
- The Second Shot (1923)
- The Royal Grenadiers (1925)
- The Iron Bride (1925)
- Their Last Love Affair (1927)
- The Tiger Murder Case (1930)
- The Rhineland Girl (1930)
- Father and Son (1930)
- 1914 (1931)
- The Woman They Talk About (1931)
- The Captain from Köpenick (1931)
- The Invisible Front (1932)
- Between Two Hearts (1934)
- The Irresistible Man (1937)
- Carousel (1937)
- A Prussian Love Story (1938)
- Dance on the Volcano (1938)
- D III 88 (1939)
- Robert Koch (1939)
- The Star of Rio (1940)
- Friedemann Bach (1941)
- Wedding in Barenhof (1942)
- Melody of a Great City (1943)
- A Beautiful Day (1944)
- Insolent and in Love (1948)
- Don't Ask My Heart (1952)

== Bibliography ==
- Giesen, Rolf. Nazi Propaganda Films: A History and Filmography. McFarland, 2003.
