= Muf (disambiguation) =

muf is a London collaborative of artists and architects.

MUF or muf may also refer to:

- MUF (programming language), "Multi-User Forth"
- Main Uralian Fault, in the Ural Mountains of Russia
- Maximum usable frequency, a term used for radio transmissions
- Moderata Ungdomsförbundet, or Moderate Youth League, Sweden
- Manchester United Football Ground railway station, UK, station code
- IATA code for Muting Airport, Indonesia
- Muslim United Front, Kashmiri political coalition
- Material unaccounted for, a discrepancy in an inventory of nuclear material
- Zdenko Muf (born 1971), a Serbian football manager

== See also ==
- Muff (disambiguation)
