= The White Terror (film) =

1917 film directed by Harry Piel

- Directed by: Harry Piel
- Written by: Harry Piel; Rudolf Kurz
- Produced by: Paul Davidson
- Production company: PAGU
- Release date: December 1917
- Country: Germany
- Languages: Silent; German intertitles

The White Terror (German: Der weiße Schrecken) is a 1917 German silent film directed by Harry Piel.

The film's art direction was by Kurt Richter.

== Cast ==
- Tilli Bébé as Abenteurerin
- Bruno Eichgrün
- Preben J. Rist as Rachesüchtiger Liebhaber

== Bibliography ==
- Douglas B. Thomas. The early history of German motion pictures, 1895-1935. Thomas International, 1999.
