= The Black Pierrot (1913 film) =

1913 film

- Directed by: Harry Piel
- Written by: Harry Piel
- Starring: Leontine Kühnberg; Ludwig Trautmann
- Cinematography: Emil Schünemann
- Production company: Continental Kunstfilm
- Release date: 14 March 1913
- Country: Germany
- Languages: Silent; German intertitles

The Black Pierrot (German: Der schwarze Pierrot) is a 1913 German silent film directed by Harry Piel.

== Cast ==
- Leontine Kühnberg
- Ludwig Trautmann

== Bibliography ==
- Thomas, Douglas B. (1999). The Early History of German Motion Pictures, 1895–1935. Washington, DC: Thomas International. ISBN 978-0-9612128-1-0.
