= Tilly Bébé =

Austrian circus performer

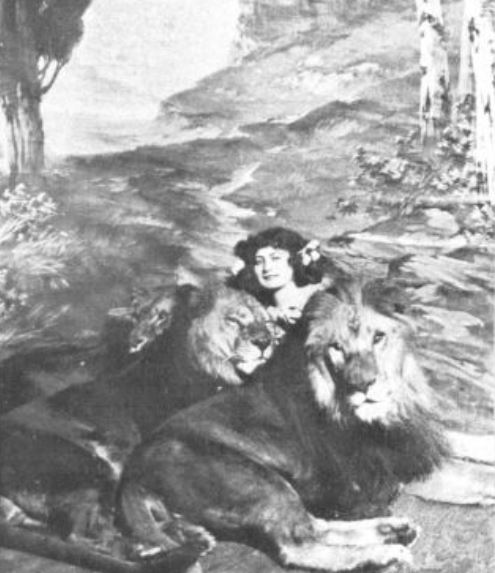
- Bébé and her lions, 1907
- Born: Mathilde Rupp; 27 March 1879; Perchtoldsdorf, Austria-Hungary
- Died: 11 April 1932 (aged 53); Vienna, Austria
- Other names: Matilda Rupp, Tilli Bébé
- Occupation: animal trainer
- Years active: 1897–1931

Mathilde Rupp (27 March 1879 – 11 April 1932), known by the stage name Tilly Bébé, was an Austrian circus performer. She was noted for her performances with large predators and is considered a pioneer in the performance aspects of lion taming. In addition to live acts, she participated in making silent films. Rupp was born in Vienna and initially trained to be a typist. Against her father's wishes, she left a position in a law firm to work with snakes in the Vienna Vivarium. She began performing with hyenas around 1897 and her father accepted her career choice, becoming her manager two years later. Bébé made appearances in many European capitals throughout her career with both lions and polar bears. She also toured South America in the 1920s. Performing into her 50s, she died in Vienna in 1932.

== Early life ==
Mathilde Rupp was born on 27 March 1879 in Perchtoldsdorf, Austria-Hungary. Her father, Franz Xaver Rupp, was a greengrocer and her grandfather was the teacher and composer Ambros Rieder. She grew up in the school building on the town square and her mother died when she was nine years old.

Rupp initially trained to be a typist at the Commercial Institute of Vienna. She obtained a job in a law firm but left to pursue a career caring for animals. Initially her father opposed the career choice, but in 1899 he gave in to her wishes, not only providing his approval but becoming her manager.

== Career ==
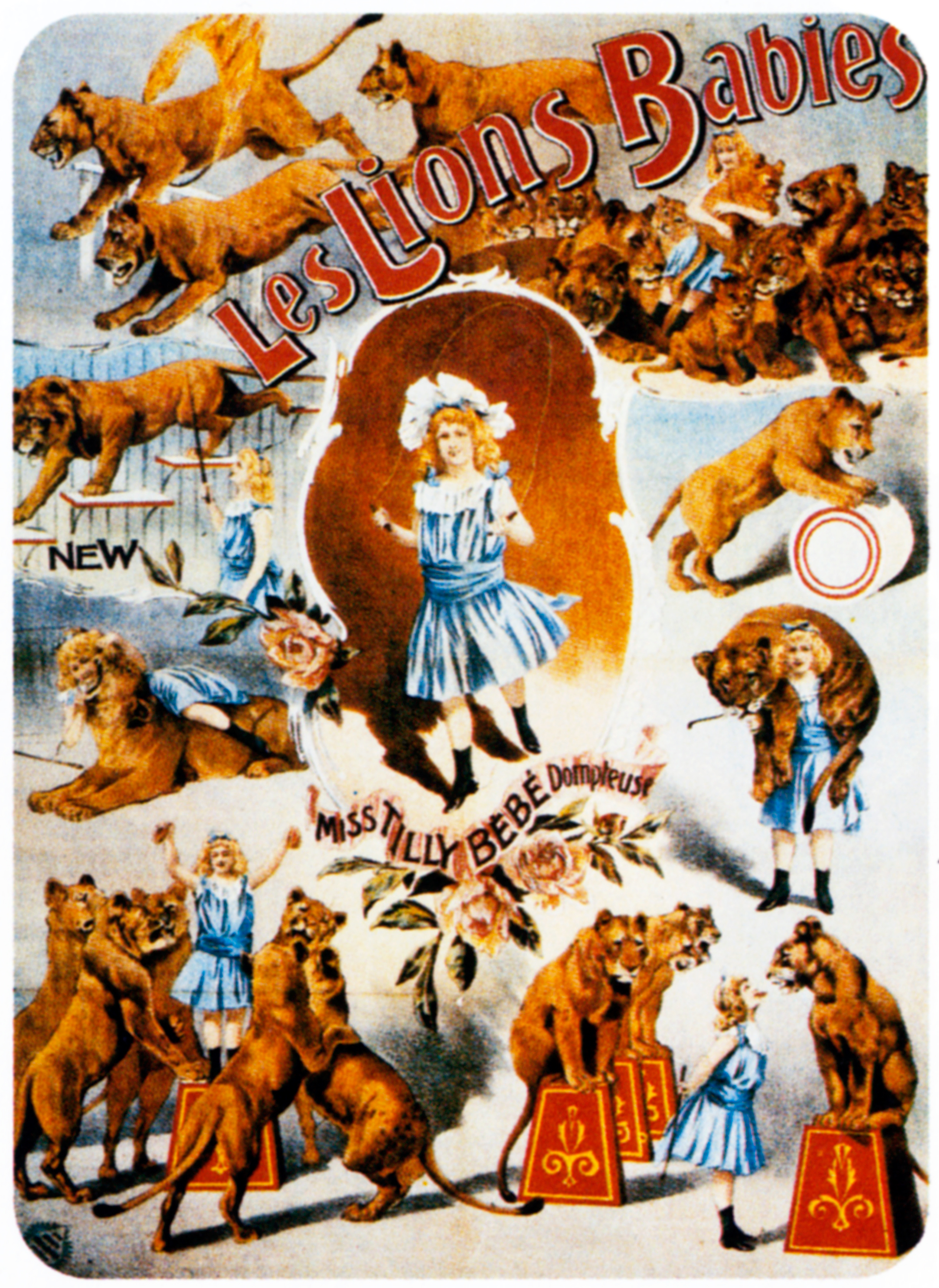
A poster announcing a performance by Bébé at the Varieté-Orpheum, in Graz (1902–03)

Rupp was first hired by the Vienna Vivarium as a snake handler in the herpetarium. Wanting to expand her skills, she trained under R. Falk to work with hyenas and began circus work around 1897. Her first performance, at the Vivarium with hyenas, was followed by a hit show in Vienna at the Ronacher with lions. Circus performing offered many opportunities that were unavailable to other women at the time and Rupp took advantage of them. She was able to choose her work, become financially independent and travel internationally.

Owing to her affection for her lions, she spent a lot of time with them; it was reported that she even slept with them. Her alternative lifestyle created considerable attention and led to the perception that she was in love with her animals, replacing life at home with a husband by her animals. By some accounts, she turned down suitors because of her love for her lions who vied for her caresses. Due to the erotic overtones in her act, she attracted press wherever she traveled and experienced the kind of fame that Mae West would have a decade later.

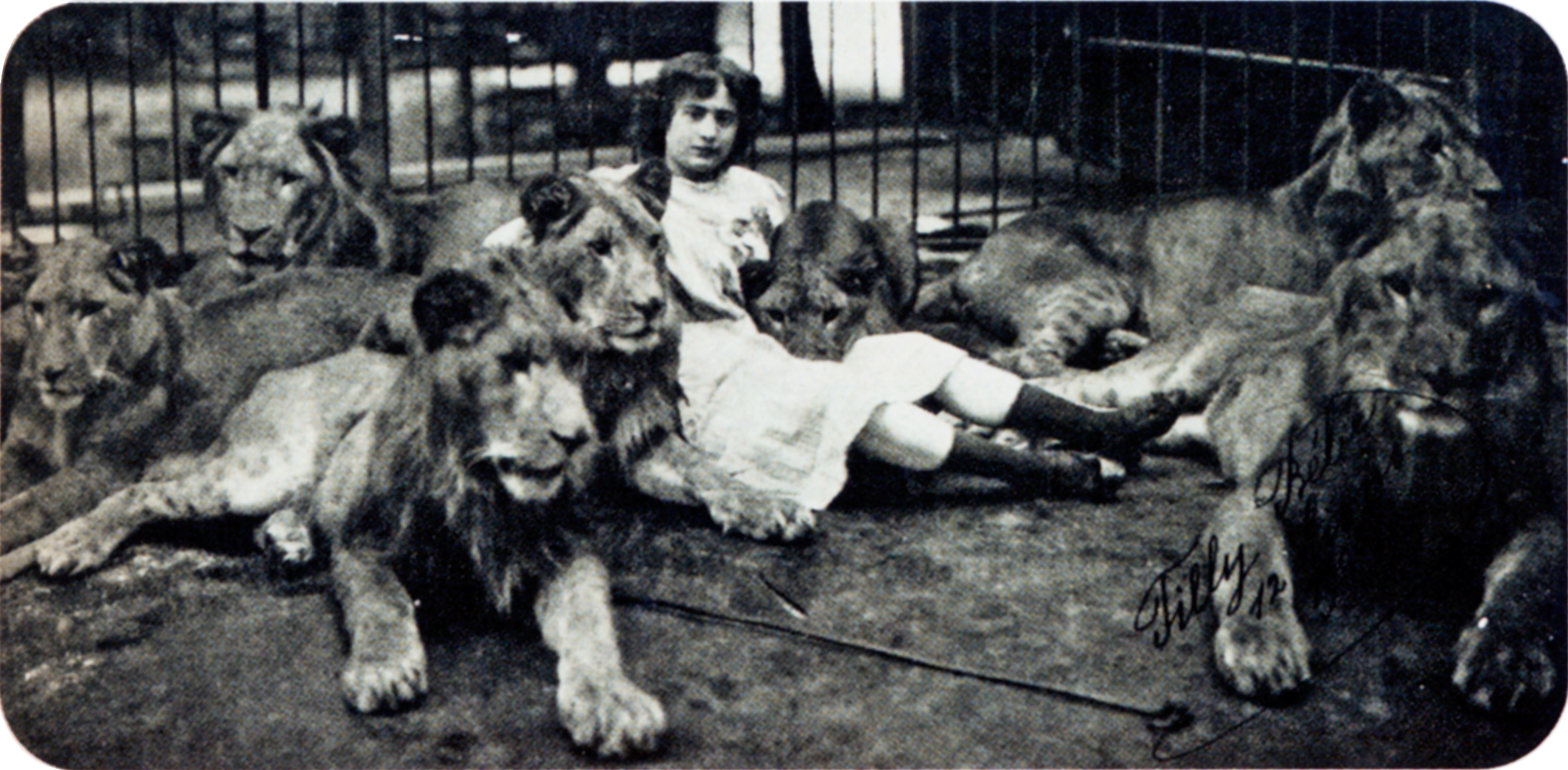
Bébé and her lions, 1905

In 1901, she trained in Bonn, Germany at the Tierpark (animal park) with Contessa X, the stage name of the daughter of Joseph-Bertrand Abadie, who not only taught her how to work with lions but, intending to retire, sold Rupp part of her pride. It was the Contessa who gave Rupp the stage name Tilly Bébé (literally, "baby Tilly").

Due to her diminutive stature, Bébé performed dressed in the garb of a little girl, using her doll-like appearance to contrast with the ferocity of her pride of lions. A master at garnering publicity, she used the press to enhance her stage persona, with stories of her demure nature and her kindness to animals.

It was frequently reported that she was a teenager, that she had been a society figure and had suffered injuries. On Christmas Day 1901, while performing at a circus in Essen, Bébé freed a fellow lion tamer from an attack by a lion, but the tamer died. Despite this incident, Bébé was soon engaged in a show at the Cirque Medrano in Paris, and, by the end of the year, was a regular feature at the Rembrandt-Theatre in Amsterdam. Performing at the Belgian Circus Krembser, at the climax of her act she put her head inside a lion's mouth before carrying him out of the arena on her shoulders.

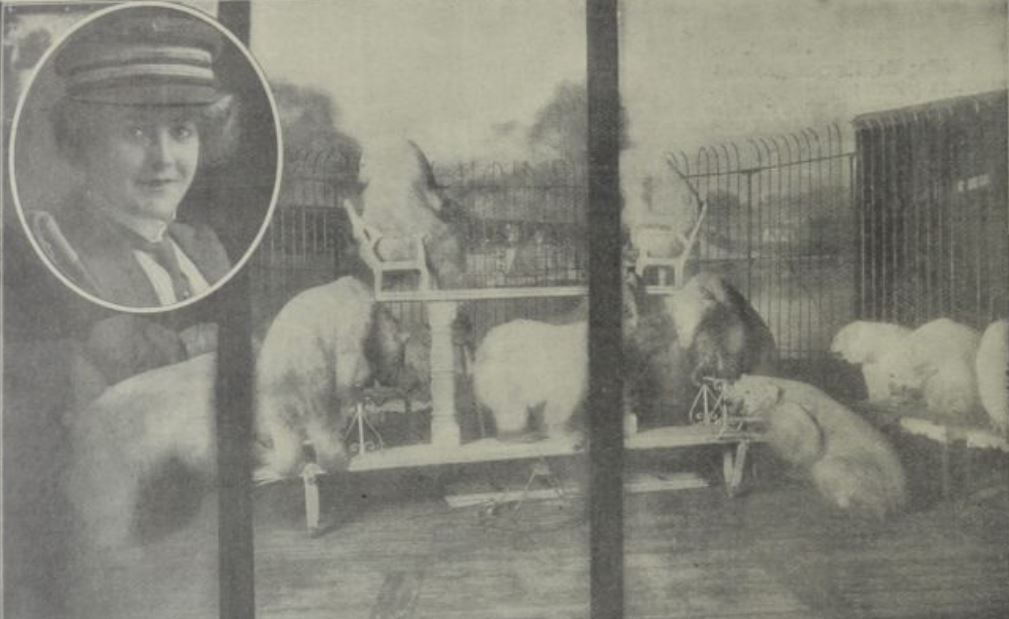
Bébé and her group of polar bears, 1907

In 1908, she began making silent films. The first, Tilly Bébé, die berühmte Löwenbändigerin (Tilly Bébé, the Famous Lion Tamer), featured Bébé as a young girl cuddling with her giant cats before prying open the mouth of a lion to show his teeth. The film is one of the best examples of the "exotic-erotic-escapist" genre that became popular at the time. That year, it was reported that she had been mauled by a lion which laid its paws on her and was about to bite her throat during a performance in the Nymphenburger Volksgarten in Munich. She hit it on the snout and moved away, dripping with blood. It turned out it was just an act as when it was repeated a few days later, she explained to the audience: "I just couldn't let him see I was frightened of him".

In 1913, she began performing in the colder months with a group of 20 polar bears. While performing with Carl Hagenbeck's circus in Germany, she handled a group of 40 polar bears. As with her lion performances, the press carried reports that the polar bears were docile in her care. She performed with them in the Circus Hagenbeek in The Hague in 1918. (Note: Several sources indicate that Bébé quit working during the war and then suffered from a lengthy illness until her death. Her film productions and later career, documented by numerous articles, show that this was not the case.) In 1923, Bébé went on tour with the Sarrasani Circus which performed throughout South America for two years. In Buenos Aires, when a lion escaped from its cage, she prevented it from being shot by grabbing it by the mane and returning it to the cage.

She performed into her 50s, having lost little of her drive. In 1928, she was working with Wilhelm Hagenbeck in Saxony. By 1930, it was reported that only three of the women who had previously worked in circuses with predators were still employed — Bébé, Mabel Stark, and a woman who performed as "Miss Texas". (Note: This is not Mrs. Herman Haupt, who performed in the 1910s as "Texas Girl". Haupt was killed in an accident with her lions in 1914–1915.)

== Death and legacy ==
Bébé died in poverty, in Vienna on 11 April 1932. She is noted as a pioneer in lion taming and for her innovations in the docile training of predators. Roman Proske published Lions, Tigers, and Me in 1956, a memoir of his years as a lion tamer, including stories about Bébé and other circus people with whom he had performed.

== Filmography ==
- 1908: Tilly Bébé, die berühmte Löwenbändigerin, producer Deutsche Bioscop
- 1916: Die Löwenbraut Tilly Bébé und ihre wilden Zöglinge, producer Duskes-Film Berlin
- 1917: Der weiße Schrecken, producer Hagenbeck Films
- 1917: When the Heart Burns with Hate, producer Saturn-Film AG
- 1917: Der Sultan von Johore, producer Projektions-AG Union
- 1917: Die Abenteuer des Kapitän Hansen, producer Eiko Film
- 1919: Die graue Frau von Alençon, producer Discus-Film, Berlin
