= When the Heart Burns with Hate =

1917 silent German film

- Directed by: Kurt Matull
- Starring: Pola Negri; Hans Adalbert Schlettow
- Cinematography: Otto Jäger
- Production company: Saturn-Film
- Distributed by: Arnold Bystrizki
- Release date: 1917
- Running time: 50 minutes
- Country: Germany
- Languages: Silent; German intertitles

When the Heart Burns with Hate (German: Wenn das Herz in Haß erglüht) is a 1917 German silent romantic drama film directed by Kurt Matull and starring Pola Negri and Hans Adalbert Schlettow.

== Cast ==
- Pola Negri as Ilja Vörösz
- Hans Adalbert Schlettow as Graf von Hohenau
- Harry Hopkins as Zirkusdirektor Hopkins
- Magnus Stifter as Baron Ilfingen
- Anna von Palen as Baronin Ilfingen
- Tilli Bébé

== Bibliography ==
- Mariusz Kotowski. Pola Negri: Hollywood's First Femme Fatale. University Press of Kentucky, 2014.
