= The Bear of the Baskervilles =

1916 film

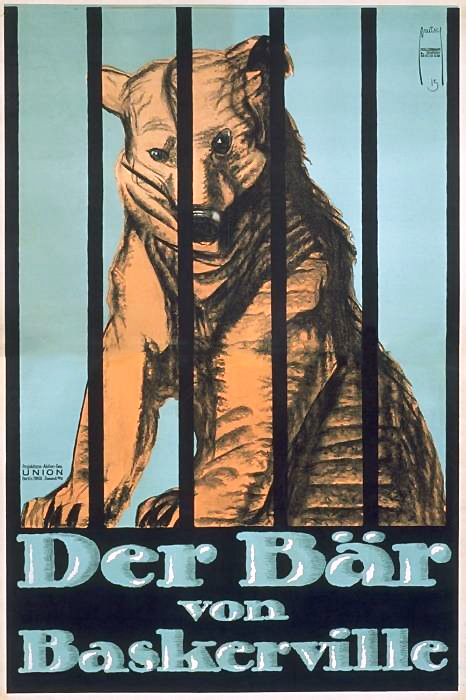
- Directed by: Harry Piel
- Production company: Pallas Film
- Release date: 4 September 1916 (Denmark)
- Country: Germany
- Languages: Silent; German intertitles

The Bear of the Baskervilles (German: Der Bär von Baskerville) is a 1916 German silent film directed by Harry Piel.

== Bibliography ==
- Bleckman, Matias (1992). Harry Piel: ein Kino-Mythos und seine Zeit. Düsseldorf: Filminstitut der Landeshaupstadt Düsseldorf. ISBN 978-3-929098-01-3.
