= My Wife's Diary =

1920 film

- Directed by: Paul L. Stein
- Written by: Hans Gaus
- Produced by: Paul L. Stein
- Starring: Alfred Abel; Heinrich Schroth
- Production company: Stein Film
- Release date: 11 November 1920
- Country: Germany
- Languages: Silent; German intertitles

My Wife's Diary (German: Tagebuch meiner Frau) is a 1920 German silent drama film directed by Paul L. Stein and starring Alfred Abel and Heinrich Schroth.

== Cast ==
- Alfred Abel
- Erra Bognar
- Gertrude Hoffman
- Willy Kaiser-Heyl
- Heinrich Schroth

== Bibliography ==
- Grange, William. Cultural Chronicle of the Weimar Republic. Scarecrow Press, 2008.
