= Heinrich Nebenzahl =

- Born: 1870; Kraków, Galicia, Austria-Hungary
- Died: 6 July 1938 (aged 67–68); Le Vésinet, Yvelines, France
- Occupation: Producer
- Years active: 1917–1930 (film)

Heinrich Nebenzahl (1870–1938) was an Austrian-born film producer. In 1925 he founded the German production company Nero Film which prospered under the management of his son Seymour Nebenzahl. In 1933 the Jewish Nebenzahls were forced to leave Germany by the coming to power of the Nazi Party. They resettled in Paris where Seymour continued to operate the company following the Nazi censorship of Seymour's film made with Fritz Lang. The Testament of Dr. Mabuse. In 1938 Heinrich died and his son Seymour and grandson, film producer Harold Nebenzal subsequently relocated to the United States.

== Selected filmography ==
- Rivals (1923)
- A Night's Adventure (1923)
- The Last Battle (1923)
- The House by the Sea (1924)
- The World Wants To Be Deceived (1926)
- Should We Be Silent? (1926)
- The Flight in the Night (1926)
- Escape to the Foreign Legion (1929)
- Helene Willfüer, Student of Chemistry (1930)

== Bibliography ==
- Prawer, S.S. Between Two Worlds: The Jewish Presence in German and Austrian Film, 1910–1933. Berghahn Books, 2005.
