= Countess Kitchenmaid =

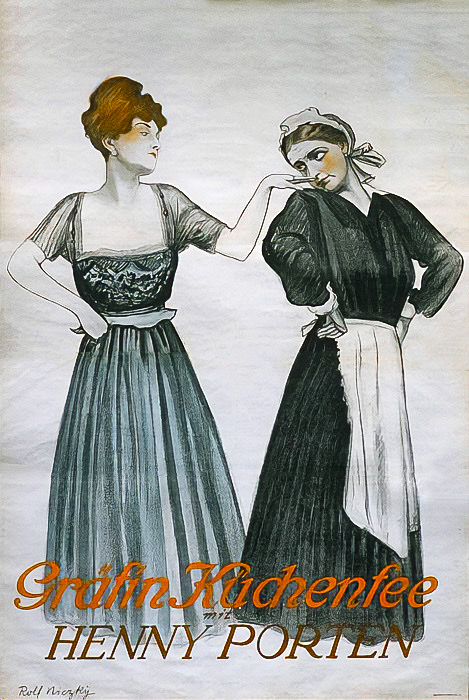
- Directed by: Rudolf Biebrach
- Written by: Robert Wiene
- Produced by: Oskar Messter
- Starring: Henny Porten; Heinrich Schroth; Martin Lübbert
- Cinematography: Karl Freund
- Music by: Giuseppe Becce
- Production company: Messter Film
- Distributed by: UFA
- Release date: 18 January 1918
- Country: Germany
- Languages: Silent; German intertitles

Countess Kitchenmaid (German: Gräfin Küchenfee) is a 1918 German silent comedy film directed by Rudolf Biebrach and starring Henny Porten, Heinrich Schroth and Martin Lübbert. While her mistress is away on an adulterous adventure, a young maid takes her place to convince a visiting dignitary that she is there with the other servants impersonating aristocrats.

== Cast ==
- Henny Porten - Gräfin Gyllenhand / Karoline Blume
- Heinrich Schroth - Graf Gyllenhand
- Martin Lübbert - Der Stürmische
- Ernst Hofmann - Der Melancholische
- Paul Biensfeldt - Fürst
- Reinhold Schünzel - Der Schüchterne
- Rudolf Biebrach (likely uncredited)

== Bibliography ==
- Jung, Uli & Schatzberg, Walter. Beyond Caligari: The Films of Robert Wiene. Berghahn Books, 1999.
