= The Black Cover =

1922 film directed by Harry Piel

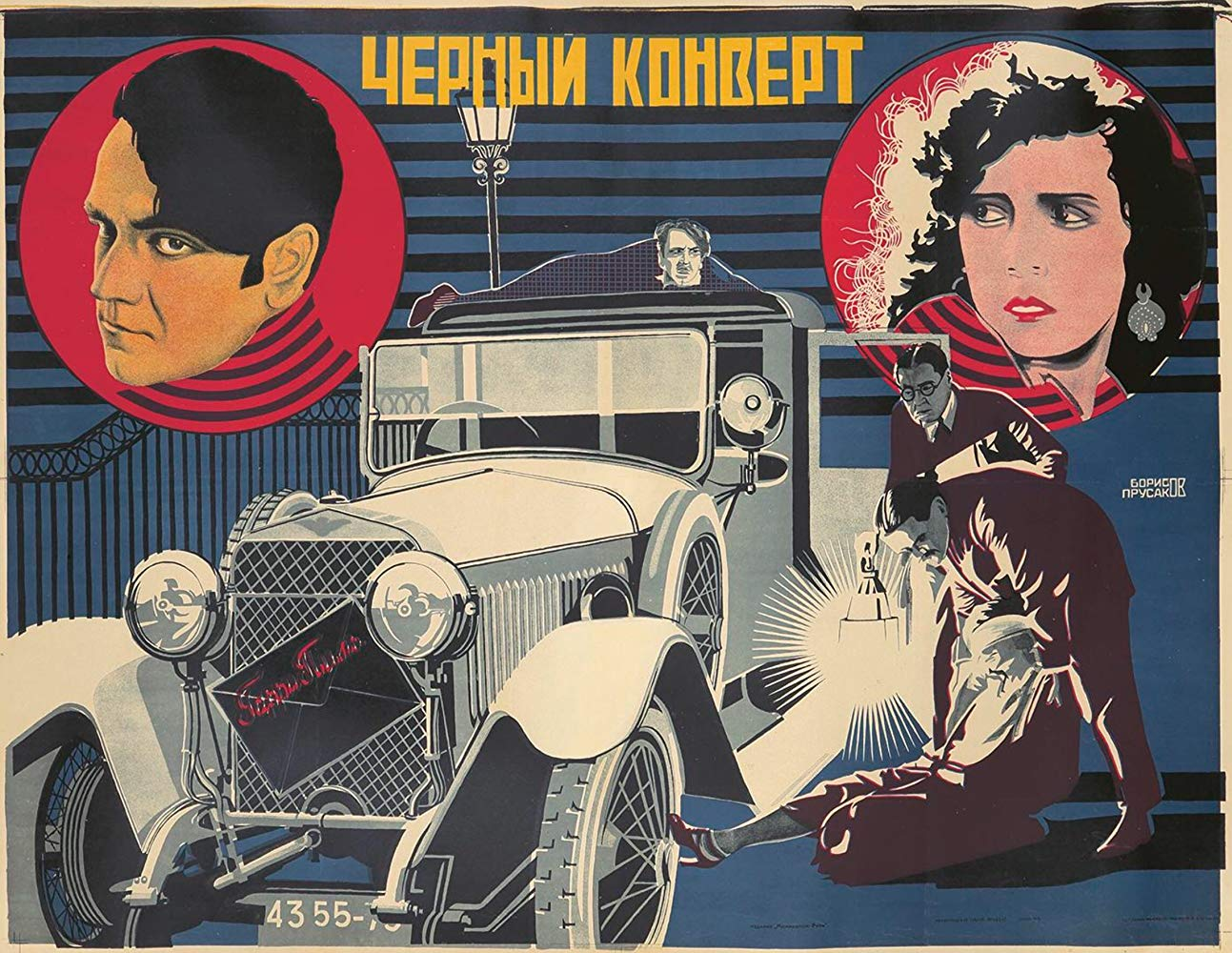
- Russian poster
- Directed by: Harry Piel
- Written by: Victor Abel; Harry Piel; Alfred Zeisler
- Produced by: Harry Piel
- Starring: Harry Piel
- Cinematography: Franz Meinecke; Georg Muschner
- Production company: Harry Piel Film
- Release date: 19 May 1922
- Running time: 97 minutes
- Country: Germany
- Languages: Silent; German intertitles

The Black Cover (German: Das schwarze Kuvert) is a 1922 German silent film directed by and starring Harry Piel.

The film's art direction was by Willi Herrmann and Albert Korell.

== Cast ==
In alphabetical order

- Charly Berger
- Else Bodenheim
- Inge Helgard
- Adolf Klein
- Albert Paulig
- Harry Piel
- Fritz Ruß
- Erich Sandt

== Bibliography ==
- Thomas, Douglas B. (1999). The Early History of German Motion Pictures, 1895–1935. Washington, DC: Thomas International. ISBN 978-0-9612128-1-0.
