= Rivals (1923 film) =

1923 film directed by Harry Piel

- Directed by: Harry Piel
- Written by: Alfred Zeisler; Victor Abel; Harry Piel
- Produced by: Louis Zimmerman; Heinrich Nebenzahl; Harry Piel
- Starring: Harry Piel; Inge Helgard; Adolf Klein; Karl Platen
- Cinematography: Georg Muschner
- Production company: Apex Film
- Release date: 23 February 1923
- Countries: Germany; United Kingdom
- Languages: Silent; German intertitles

Rivals (German: Rivalen) is a 1923 German-British silent adventure film directed by Harry Piel and starring Piel, Inge Helgard and Adolf Klein. It premiered in Berlin on 23 February 1923.

== Cast ==
- Harry Piel
- Inge Helgard
- Adolf Klein
- Karl Platen
- Charly Berger
- Albert Paulig
- Heinz Stieda
- Maria Wefers

== Bibliography ==
- Grange, William. Cultural Chronicle of the Weimar Republic. Scarecrow Press, 2008.
