= The Muff =

- Directed by: Joe May; Harry Piel
- Written by: Alfred Fekete; Richard Hutter; Harry Piel
- Produced by: Joe May
- Starring: Hella Ingrid; Heinrich Schroth; Stefan Vacano
- Cinematography: Max Lutze
- Production company: May-Film
- Distributed by: UFA
- Release date: 21 May 1919
- Country: Germany
- Languages: Silent; German intertitles

The Muff (German: Der Muff) is a 1919 German silent crime film directed by Joe May and Harry Piel and starring Hella Ingrid, Heinrich Schroth and Stefan Vacano. It is part of the series of films featuring popular detective Joe Deebs.

It was shot at the Tempelhof Studios in Berlin.

== Cast ==
- Heinrich Schroth as Joe Deebs, Detektiv
- Hella Ingrid
- Stefan Vacano

== Bibliography ==
- Hans-Michael Bock & Michael Töteberg. Das Ufa-Buch. Zweitausendeins, 1992.
