= Heinrich Schroth =

German actor

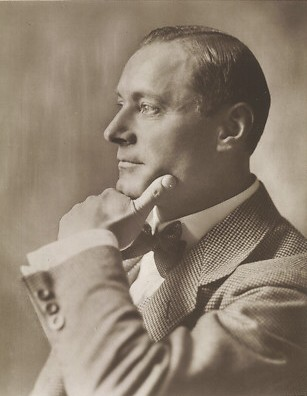
- Schroth, c. 1920
- Born: Heinrich August Franz Schroth; 23 March 1871; Pirmasens, Kingdom of Bavaria, German Empire
- Died: 14 January 1945 (aged 73); Berlin, Nazi Germany
- Occupation: Actor
- Years active: 1890–1943
- Spouses: Else Ruttersheim (divorced); Käthe Haack (m. 1922)
- Children: 3, including Carl-Heinz Schroth and Hannelore Schroth

Heinrich August Franz Schroth (23 March 1871 – 14 January 1945) was a German stage and film actor.

== Career ==
Schroth was born in Pirmasens, Rhineland-Palatinate, Germany. He made his acting debut at the Sigmaringen Royal Theatre in 1890. In 1894 he went to the Municipal Theatre in Augsburg, in 1896 to Mainz and in 1897 to the Royal Court Theatre in Hanover. From 1899 to 1905, he spent six years as a part of the ensemble of the Deutsches Schauspielhaus in Hamburg and from 1905 onwards at various Berlin theatres.

Schroth made his film debut in the 1916 Walter Schmidthässler-directed drama Welker Lorbeer. He spent the 1910s in numerous German silent film productions, working with such directors as George Jacoby, Robert Wiene and Harry Piel. His career in the 1920s was prolific, and he appeared opposite such silent film actors as Lil Dagover, Emil Jannings, Paul Wegener and Brigitte Helm and transitioned to sound film with ease.

During World War II Heinrich Schroth participated in a large number of film productions for the Nazi Party, including propaganda films for the Nazi regime. In the final phase of the Second World War, Reich Minister of Propaganda Joseph Goebbels placed Schroth on the Gottbegnadeten list ("God-gifted list" or "Important Artist Exempt List"), a 36-page list of artists considered crucial to Nazi culture. Schroth's most memorable role of the World War II era is possibly that of the role of Herr von Neuffer in the 1940 Veit Harlan-directed, antisemitic melodrama Jud Süß, commissioned by Joseph Goebbels.

Schroth's stage and film career spanned five decades. He died in January 1945.

== Personal life ==
Heinrich Schroth was married three times. Little is known of his first wife. The couple had a son, Heinz Schroth (1902–1957). His second wife was Else Ruttersheim, a noblewoman and aspiring actress from Ljubljana, with whom he had a son, actor and director Carl-Heinz Schroth (aka Heinz Sailer) in 1902. His third wife was German actress Käthe Haack, with whom he had a daughter, actress Hannelore Schroth in 1922.

== Selected filmography ==
- The Queen's Love Letter (1916)
- The Queen's Secretary (1916)
- Dr. Hart's Diary (1917) as Dr. Robert Hart
- The Nun and the Harlequin (1918)
- The Rolling Hotel (1918) as Joe Deebs
- Countess Kitchenmaid (1918) as Count Gyllenhand
- The Salamander Ruby (1918) as Attenhofer
- Put to the Test (1918) as Count von Steinitz,
- The Rat (1918) as Joe Deebs
- Out of the Depths (1919) as the American
- Madeleine (1919)
- The Muff (1919) as Joe Deebs
- The Skull of Pharaoh's Daughter (1920)
- Respectable Women (1920)
- Demon Blood (1920)
- The Eyes as the Accuser (1920) as Detective Bill Roid
- My Wife's Diary (1920)
- Jim Cowrey is Dead (1921)
- The Drums of Asia (1921) as Hopkins
- Love and Passion (1921)
- The False Dimitri (1922) as Jurjew
- Shadows of the Past (1922) as Henrik Krag
- Marie Antoinette, the Love of a King (1922) as the Count of Orléans
- The Strumpet's Plaything (1922)
- The Homecoming of Odysseus (1922)
- All for Money (1923) as the director of the Phönix-Werke
- The Sensational Trial (1923) as the "Contestable Existence"
- And Yet Luck Came (1923)
- Horrido (1924)
- The Heart of Lilian Thorland (1924)
- Living Buddhas (1925) as Dr. Smith
- People to Each Other (1926)
- The Great Duchess (1926) as Steenberg
- Tea Time in the Ackerstrasse (1926)
- The Poacher (1926) as Count Oetzbach
- The Lady with the Tiger Skin (1927) as Henry Seymor
- Prinz Louis Ferdinand (1927) as Yorck
- The Great Adventuress (1928)
- Alraune (1928) as a bar patron
- The President (1928) as Deon Ramirez
- Misled Youth (1929) as the commissioner
- Atlantik (1929) as Harry von Schroeder
- 1914 (1931) as War Minister von Falkenhayn
- Berlin-Alexanderplatz (1931)
- The Fate of Renate Langen (1931) as Schrott
- The Captain from Köpenick (1931) as the police chief
- No Money Needed (1932)
- Man Without a Name (1932)
- The First Right of the Child (1932)
- Girls of Today (1933)
- A City Upside Down (1933) as Revisionsrat
- William Tell (1934) as the Imperial commander
- At the Strasbourg (1934) as the commandant
- Stradivari (1935)
- The Foolish Virgin (1935) as Professor
- The Schimeck Family (1935)
- The Emperor's Candlesticks (1936) as conspirator
- Uncle Bräsig (1936) as Karl Hawermann
- The Traitor (1936) as the general manager of T-Metallwerke
- Woman's Love—Woman's Suffering (1937) as the attending physician
- The Coral Princess (1937) as Dr. Milich
- The Ruler (1937) as Direktor Hofer
- Urlaub auf Ehrenwort (1938) as the lieutenant Colonel
- Comrades at Sea (1938) as the capitain of the Marana
- Covered Tracks (1938) as Count Duval
- The Secret Lie (1938) as Chefarzt
- Dance on the Volcano (1938)
- The Merciful Lie (1939)
- Ursula Under Suspicion (1939) as Gast bei Tweels
- The Right to Love (1939)
- Water for Canitoga (1939) as Gouverneur
- Target in the Clouds (1939) as Commander von Selbitz
- Jud Süss (1940) as Mr. Von Neuffer
- Friedemann Bach (1941) as the landlord of Baron von Solnau
- The Dismissal (1942) as General von Caprivi
- The Great King (1942) as General Balthasar Rudolf von Schenckendorf
- Melody of a Great City (1943) as the old man
