= Max Ruhbeck =

German actor

- Born: 1 September 1858
- Died: 2 November 1945 (aged 87)
- Occupation: Actor
- Years active: 1915–1923

Max Ruhbeck (1 September 1858 – 2 November 1945) was a German actor. He appeared in more than ninety films from 1915 to 1923.

== Selected filmography ==
Year	Title	Role	Notes
1916	Homunculus		
1918	Diplomats		
1921	The Girl from Piccadilly		
1921	About the Son		
1921	The Black Spider		
1921	The Demon of Kolno		
1922	The Queen of Whitechapel		
1922	Women Who Commit Adultery		
1923	The Man in the Iron Mask		
