= Harry Piel =

German actor, filmmaker (1892–1963)

- autographed photo, date unknown
- Born: Heinrich Piel; 12 July 1892; Düsseldorf, German Empire
- Died: 27 March 1963 (aged 70); Munich, Bavaria, West Germany
- Occupation: Actor
- Years active: 1912–1953
- Spouse: Dary Holm

Heinrich Piel (12 July 1892 – 27 March 1963), known professionally as Harry Piel, was a prolific German actor, film director, screenwriter, and film producer who was involved in over 150 films.

Piel became a director in 1912, turning out such box-office successes as Mann Gegen Mann (1928), Achtung! - Auto-Diebe! (1930) and Artisten (1935). His last directorial effort was 1953's Gesprengte Gitter (Elephant Fury, a.k.a. Panic), which he also produced, wrote, and starred.

== Early life ==
After attending elementary school in Benrath and High School in Derendorf, Piel became a cadet in 1909 on a sailing ship, the Grand Duchess Elizabeth. In 1911, however, he finished his cadet hood and moved to Berlin in 1912 where he created the "Art Film Publishing House Company" and made, as a director, screenwriter and producer, his first feature Black Blood (1912) with Curt Goetz in the lead role. Further films followed, based on adventure and action.

== Career ==
Piel received the nickname "the dynamite director" because of his penchant for including explosion sequences in his films. These were authentic: Piel had befriended a demolition engineer who was often commissioned to dynamite bridges and other condemned structures slated for demolition. The engineer notified Piel of these assignments in advance: Piel filmed the explosions, then inserted the footage into his films.

In 1915, Piel became bored with just standing behind the camera and he started to act. The first film with him as a leading actor, Die große Wette (transl. "The Big Bet"), was a science fiction adventure, involving robots. Unter heißer Zone, 1916 included for the first time scenes with wild animals, which he had partly trained himself and which he used later in other films.

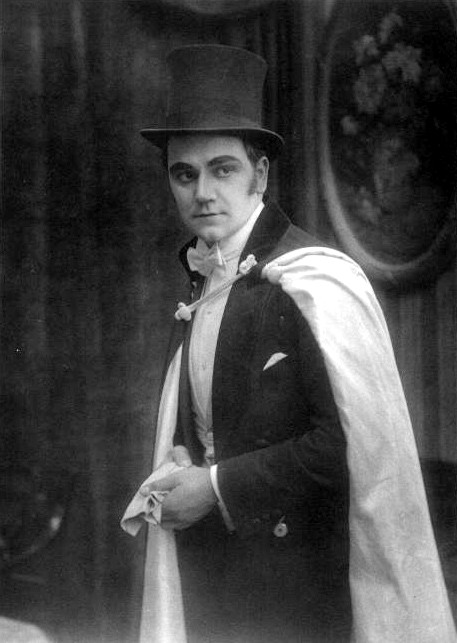
Harry Piel acting in a film

This was followed by a number of films between 1918 and 1919, in which he played the detective "Joe Deebs" eight times and with the film To the Large Unknown Quantity (1919) began to be credited by the name "Harry Peel" internationally.

In 1930 he directed the comedy Him or Me (1930), and many successful adventure films were to follow, such as Shade of the Underworld (1931), Johnny Steals Europe (1932), The Ship Without a Port, The Call of the Jungle (1935) and His Best Friend (1937).

In 1933 Harry Piel became a patron member of the SS and also joined the NSDAP.

This, however, did not avert difficulties with the Nazis, and his film Panik (1943) was banned for its all too realistic air attacks. It depicted a German hero who traps wild animals in Africa for German zoos. At the film's climax, an air-raid on a German city frees the zoo animals from their cages; when they run loose in the streets, the people are terrified and only the heroic trapper can recapture the beasts. During World War II, this film was suppressed by Reich censors who did not want the German people to believe that Germany was in danger from aerial bombardments. In the final stages of World War II, Reich Ministry of Public Enlightenment and Propaganda Joseph Goebbels included Piel on the Gottbegnadeten list, a 36-page list of artists considered crucial to Nazi culture.

Seventy-two negatives of his films, nearly all his silent film, were destroyed in an air attack. After the collapse of the Third Reich, Harry Piel, who had been a sustaining member of the SS, and had at first concealed this, was sentenced to six months detention and five years professional disqualification. After his denazification, he founded "Ariel Film" in 1950 in Hamburg with which he had only moderate success.

After Gesprengte Gitter (Elephant Fury, 1953), Piel withdrew from filmmaking. He died in 1963.

== Filmography ==
- Dämone der Tiefe (1912)
- Der Börsenkönig (1912)
- Nachtschatten (1913)
- Der schwarze Pierrot (1913)
- Der grüne Teufel (1913)
- Im Leben verspielt (1913)
- Menschen und Masken (1913)
- Seelenadel (1913)
- Erblich belastet? (1913)
- Harakiri (1913)
- Die Millionenmine (1913)
- Die braune Bestie (1914)
- Der geheimnisvolle Nachtschatten (1914)
- Das Teufelsauge (1914)
- Das geheimnisvolle Zeichen (1914)
- Das Abenteuer eines Journalisten (1914)
- Der schwarze Husar (1915)
- Der Bär von Baskerville (1915)
- Manya, die Türkin (1915)
- Im Banne der Vergangenheit (1915)
- Das Geheimnis von D. 14 (1915)
- Police Nr. 1111 (1915)
- Das verschwundene Los (1915)
- Das lebende Rätsel (1916)
- Unter heißer Zone (1916)
- Das geheimnisvolle Telephon (1916)
- Zur Strecke gebracht (1917)
- Der Sultan von Johore (1917)
- Der weiße Schrecken (1917)
- Um eine Million (1917)
- Der stumme Zeuge (1917)
- Sein Todfeind (1917)
- Das amerikanische Duell (1918)
- The Rat (1918)
- Das rollende Hotel (1918)
- Diplomaten (1918)
- Die närrische Fabrik (1918)
- Das Auge des Götzen (1919)
- The Muff (1919)
- Der blaue Drachen (1919)
- Der rätselhafte Klub (1919)
- Der grosse Coup (1919)
- Über den Wolken (1919)
- Die Geheimnisse des Zirkus Barré (1920)
- The Air Pirates (1920)
- The Flying Car (1920)
- Der Verächter des Todes (1920)
- Das Gefängnis auf dem Meeresgrund (1920)
- Der Reiter ohne Kopf (1921)
- Dier Fürst der Berge (1921)
- The Lost House (1922)
- Das schwarze Kuvert (1922)
- Rivals (1923)
- The Last Battle (1923)
- Abenteuer einer Nacht (1923)
- The Fake Emir (1924)
- A Dangerous Game (1924)
- Dangerous Clues (1924)
- The Man Without Nerves (1924)
- Swifter Than Death (1925)
- Zigano (1925)
- Adventure on the Night Express (1925)
- The Black Pierrot (1926)
- Eyes Open, Harry! (1926), also known as „Sechs Wochen unter Apachen"
- What's Going On at the Beely Circus? (1926)
- His Greatest Bluff (1927)
- Night of Mystery (1927)
- Panic (1928)
- Man Against Man (1928)
- His Strongest Weapon (1928)
- Taxi at Midnight (1929)
- Men Without Work (1929)
- His Best Friend (1929)
- People in the Fire (1930)
- Achtung! - Auto-Diebe! (1930)
- Him or Me (1930)
- Shadows of the Underworld (1931)
- Bobby Gets Going (1931)
- Johnny Steals Europe (1932)
- Secret Agent (1932)
- Ship Without a Harbour (1932)
- Jumping Into the Abyss (1933)
- The Black Forest Girl (1933, producer)
- The World Without a Mask (1934)
- Master of the World (1934)
- Artisten (1935)
- The Call of the Jungle (1936)
- Ninety Minute Stopover (1936)
- His Best Friend (1937)
- Wie einst im Mai (1938)
- The Impossible Mister Pitt (1938)
- Men, Animals and Sensations (1938)
- The Big Number (1943, screenplay)
- The Man in the Saddle (1945)
- The Tiger Akbar (1951)
- Elephant Fury (1953)
