= Achtung, die Kurve! =

- Developers: Filip Oščádal; Kamil Doležal
- Platforms: Amiga, MS-DOS
- Release: 1993, 1995
- Genre: Snake
- Mode: Multiplayer

Achtung, die Kurve!, also known as Curve Fever or simply Achtung, is a freeware, multiplayer snake game. Played by two to eight players simultaneously, players leave a trail and try to make the opponent hit a wall or trail first. The game is controlled by only two buttons to turn left or right, and players can turn and travel in any direction, not limited to the four cardinal directions. The game has several popular remakes.

== Background ==
The game is a clone of another Czech game Červi (Worms) from 1993, differing in that the lines now have holes. Author is Filip Oščádal, aka Fred Brooker, from the Czech Republic who made this game, together with Kamil Doležal, for Commodore Amiga including music, sound effects and graphical background (worm speed depending on the picture). The game was written in Motorola 68000 assembly. The title is in German.

== Gameplay ==
Each player spawns as a dot in a random location on the playing field and moves at a constant speed. Each player can turn left or right, but the turning speed is limited, making sharp turns impossible. As the dot travels across the field, it leaves a permanent, solid line in its wake, colored according to the player. When the dot collides with any part of the line or the boundary of the playing field, that player instantly loses; however, the line remains on the field until the end of the game. The challenge increases as more of the field gets blocked off by lines. Other players may attempt to create barriers to block the paths of their opponents, forcing them into collisions. However, as the lines are drawn, gaps occasionally appear that can be used to escape sections of the map that have been blocked off. The game is won when all but one player has collided.

In its original version, up to six people can play at the same time. All the lines are exactly the same, the color being the only thing setting the different lines apart. All the keys on the keyboard must be used to play this game as it takes a lot of skill and talent.

== Tournaments ==
In the summer of 2004 in Utrecht, Netherlands, the first-ever Achtung tournament was won by the Turkish Nationals. This tournament became a major success and paved the way for an even bigger tournament three years later. In October 2007, a second tournament was held in Jakarta, Indonesia in part of the nation's gaming tournaments. In front of a crowd of around 400, Indonesia's Mighty Badgers defeated Sam's Club from Singapore in the final. The majority of the contenders were part of IASAS schools. In December 2006, a third tournament took place at the Faculty of Electrical Engineering and Computing, University of Zagreb in Zagreb, Croatia where professors participated.

In 2012, the first Worldwide Tournament for Achtung was held where paying players of the game could attend in an online tournament. Maikkon won this first online tournament. In Sweden there were Achtung tournaments for a couple of years at a LAN party called Birdie, with around 1,000 people each year, in 2012 the winner won a graphics card from AMD. In January 2012, there was a "world cup" tournament in Denmark with 98 players from 13 countries. In the final there were five different countries represented: Dennis Zorko (Slovakia), Robert Feltcak (Poland), Pontus Larsson (Denmark), Anton Westman (Norway), Hampus Karlsson (Sweden) and Jimmie Klum (Sweden). The final was played in six games and Klum was the winner, Westman took second, and Karlsson took third. The prize was €1,000 collected from entry fees. The winner of the 2018 world cup was Johannes "Skillhannes" Girsch, also known as "the Austrian sniper".

== Legacy ==
The game's community created many remakes of Achtung die Kurve to be able to port the now-unsupported game to modern platforms, and to be played online from a web-browser:

- GitHub hosted Zatacka X remake was ported to the OpenPandora handheld in 2016. The game became a quite popular freeware download, for instance Softpedia counted 40,000 downloads of Zatacka. A shareware example of a similar game concept first released in 1998 is Vipers, which optionally includes AI-controlled opponents.
- achtungkurve.com, an open Source HTML5 and JavaScript version of Achtung, die Kurve!
- achtungkurve.net, an open Source remake by German duo Krito and the Stoker released in 2018.
- Curve Fever, published 2011 by the Dutch authors ZaaaK, Geert van den Burg and Robin Brouns, which ceased operations and was continued by Curve Fever Pro.
- Curve Crash, launched in 2021, the game is a browser-based remake of the now-defunct Curve Fever 2, highly resembling it.
- Achtung Royale Released in 2026. A modern browser-based version of the classical game. Introduces competative ranking and playable on phones.
