= Arthur Müller =

German entrepreneur and inventor

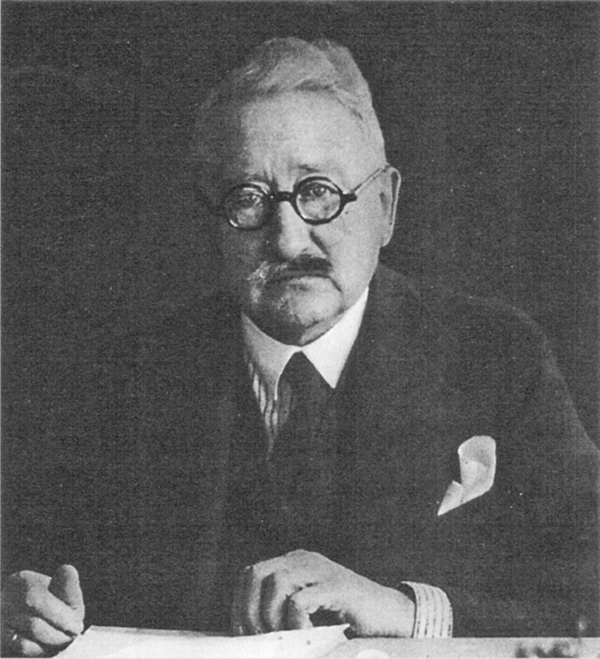
- Born: Aron Cohn; 23 October 1871; Stuhm, West Prussia, Germany
- Died: 19 January 1935; Berlin, Germany
- Occupations: Entrepreneur; Feed and fertilizer merchant Inventor and producer of "Müllers Mais-Melasse" animal feed Inventor of numerous industrial products and house building components Pioneer producer of all-steel car bodies
- Spouse: Thekla Sara Benari (1873–1953)
- Children: Heinrich Max Müller (1899–1983); Ludwig Werner Wilhelm Müller (1901–1989)
- Parent(s): Jeanette and Max Müller or Cohn

Arthur Müller (born Aron Cohn: 23 October 1871 – 19 January 1935) was a German entrepreneur and inventor. He became known as the founder and director of the "Deutsche Flugplatz Gesellschaft" ("German Airfield Company"), which instigated, built and then operated the "Motorflugplatz Johannisthal-Adlershof", Germany's first (and by a few weeks Europe's second) commercial airfield.

== Life and business ==
=== Provenance and early years ===
Aron Cohn was born into a Jewish family in Stuhm (as Sztum was known at that time), in West Prussia, a short distance to the south of Danzig. The little town had become something of a backwater at the heart of a region in which the principal source of wealth was the cultivation of grain, potatoes and sugar beet: the Cohns were among a handful of practicing Jews in what was - slightly unusually in this part of Germany - a predominantly Catholic town. He was the third son of Jeanette and Max Müller: there were also three sisters. Little is known of his childhood: sources speculate that the family was associated with a pharmacy shown in an old photograph of the town, which carries on its frontage the name "Cohn". According to an otherwise uncorroborated mention in a condolence book from the time of his death, his father died at a relatively young age, leaving his widowed mother to bring up the family on her own. Nor is it clear whether it was the entire family that at some stage switched their name from Cohn to Müller, or whether it was solely the aviation pioneer Arthur Müller who took that step, possibly applying it retrospectively also to his parents.

In 1885 Aron/Arthur enrolled at the Lutheran gymnasium (secondary school) further to the south, in Schweidnitz (Lower Silesia), indicating that the family was not completely destitute. Sources speculate that in order to attend the school he will have needed to stay with relatives in the area or else - more unusually - to attend the school as a "boarder". Subsequently, he undertook a business oriented training in Posen, which he completed in 1895, before embarking on a career in the animal-feed business. By 1895 Aron Cohn had unambiguously become known as Arthur Müller, although the name change would not be officially implemented till 1912: it was not unusual for Jewish families to adopt mainstream non-Jewish names during this period. Müller worked as a sales representative for three major fertilizer and feed companies, based respectively in Hamburg, Hanover and New York City. It was also during or very shortly after 1895, aged just 24, that he started his own business, devising and commercialising the feed formulation "Müllers Mais-Melasse", which incorporated molasses and a corn-glucose based ingredient imported from America. This product received an important endorsement from the influential Agriculture Faculty at the University of Bonn. It had also made Arthur Müller usefully rich.

=== Berlin and marriage ===
In or before 1898 Arthur Müller relocated to Berlin from where, till 1902, he continued to run his animal feed business. He was living in the German capital when he married Thekla Sara Benari (1873–1953), the daughter of a well-placed Jewish family from Coburg. The marriage was followed by the births of the couple's two sons, Max and Ludwig.

=== Lightweight commercial buildings ===
1902 saw an abrupt change of direction, as Müller's entrepreneurial ambition and inventiveness continued to burn brightly. Contacts with the rapidly mechanising and consolidating agriculture sector made him acutely aware of the growing shortage of warehouse space for newly harvested farm crops. Hay was often stored out of doors and crops often deteriorated due to poor storage. He therefore teamed up with a technical expert to develop a new type of storage barn, using inexpensive lightweight techniques employing a timber skeleton frame that could be covered with timber or simply with tarpaulin sheeting. He patented his invention appropriately. The business flourished, benefitting from a campaign being run by the Prussian government, backed by a budget of 4.2 million marks, to encourage the construction of barns for crops and livestock.

In order to expand the business he took on two friends as investors and co-shareholders, and in 1908 the lightweight construction business was relaunched as the "Arthur Müller Land- und Industriebauten AG" company. His new partners in the business were Karl Frank, a dealer in agricultural land from Pomerania who specialised in the break-up and resale of the huge Prussian landed estates, and Karl Haerms, a timber wholesaler who would play an important role in Müller subsequent business dealings. Müller's lightweight storage barns quickly found applications beyond the agriculture sector, notably in the emerging aerospace sector, first as hangars for airships and air balloons, and soon also for winged aircraft. For the first International Air Transport Exhibition, (Note: The "Internationale Luftschiffahrt-Ausstellung" was generally referred to by its initials as the ILA, which at this point stood for "International Airship Exhibition". It seems to have been during or very soon after the 1909 exhibition that the middle "L" came to stand not for "Luftschiffahrt" but for "Luftfahrt" or (loosely) "Air Transport".) held at Frankfurt in 1909, Arthur Müller constructed all the airship hangars at his own risk, and rented them out to the organisers.

=== Der Motorflugplatz Johannisthal-Adlershof ===
It was from Georg von Tschudi, the director of the Frankfurt exhibition, that Müller learned of plans to build an airfield at Berlin. Von Tschudi was a member of the original German Aero-Club founded in 1907, and a former member of the Prussian airship corps who had returned from a two-year assignment with the Moroccan government the previous year, also told fellow aviation enthusiasts about Müller who now became an enthusiastic member of Germany's small band of active aviation pioneers, albeit a member without a pilot's license. Early in 1909 the "fantastic air project" - or at least a fantastically embellished version of it - became public knowledge as result of an article appearing in the Berliner Tagesblatt on 8 March 1909. The previous day, Müller had held an informal meeting in the second class waiting room at Niederschöneweide–Johannisthal station, close to the intended airfield site. His interlocutors were two senior members of the local forestry department and his purposes was to discuss practical details of how the project might unfold. From the subsequent press report, it would appear that an employee of the station catering staff was listening. High levels of media interest would become an on-going aspect of the airfield project.

Up till now Zeppelin landings and the first trials with winged aircraft at Berlin had taken place on military training areas such as the Tempelhofer Feld: it was becoming apparent that the development of civil air travel was being held back by the absence of any more suitable facilities than these. Through contacts from his time in the agriculture sector, Müller was in a position to ensure that the "German Airfield Company", which was in the process of being set up in order to manage the airfield project, would be able to acquire rights to use the land for the future airfield inexpensively from the Prussian Forestry Administration. Such favourable financial terms would not be available directly to the already heavily indebted "German Airfield Company", however. Müller became a key investor and in many respects the de facto business leader of the airfield project team.

It was envisaged that the running of the airfield would be financed by entry fees from visitors making use of the anticipated daily passenger flights or attending special events. Most of the necessary airfield infrastructure, such as the wooden sheds and the aircraft hangars, audience barriers, ticket kiosks and the spectator stands were constructed by Müller's own company, "Arthur Müller Land- und Industriebauten AG". Despite delays involving the leased part of the site, meaning that a start could only be made on felling the trees on it on 1 September 1909, by 26 September 1909 it was possible to use the site for the opening of Germany's first-ever "flight week" ("die deutsche Flugwoche"). The Minister for War, Karl von Einem, took a close interest, but was slow to provide practical support. However, during September 1909 the minister agreed to make soldiers available for tree felling duties which, under the circumstances, was a valuable and timely intervention. The "Motorflugplatz Johannisthal-Adlershof" opened with a competitive flying display on 26 September 1909 followed by a week long celebration and exhibition. In total, the organiser and organisers were provided with 7 beer tents, 9 large toilets, 3 small toilets and a large car park. The event was a great public success, but in strictly financial terms results were disappointing: expenses and fees paid to the "flying stars" and other celebrities for their participation were not matched by revenue from ticket sales. Not for the last time, Müller was invited to fund the shortfall.

A separate company was formed by Arthur Müller on 30 October 1910 with a share capital of 2.2 million marks. The name of the company was "Terrain-Aktien-Gesellschaft am Flugplatz Johannisthal/Adlershof", but it is more usually identified in sources by its initials as "Tagafia". The defining objective of the company was to derive benefit from land to be acquired by it, whether through purchase, lease or other commercial involvement, and to participate in other land and construction related business. The background was the position of the "Forstfiskus", the government agency responsible for making available the leased part of the land. The Forstfiskus would be prepared grant a lease for the airfield site to the successful and eminently solvent businessman Arthur Müller (which included, by implication, a company controlled and backed by him). However, such an option could not be granted to the existing "German Airfield Company" (which was now dissolved). The agency's position was the one laid down earlier that year in a Cabinet Order" ("Allerhöchste Kabinettsorder") dated 21 March 1910 and the ensuing Ministerial Decree dated 9 April 1910, both of which expressly endorsed Müller's involvement. The "Tagafia" finally acquired the site for the Johannisthal Airfield: according to one source, 31% of the land came from the municipalities of Johannisthal and Adlershof at nil cost, in recognition that the project was a "community objective". Also included in the deal was a stipulation that Müller personally should have a right of first refusal in respect of the 300 hectare airfield site acquired for a "substantial price" by the "Tagafia" company. The creation of the "Tagafia" was only one of a number of company formations that Müller undertook around this time in connection with the airfield project, which presumably protected the airfield project, but which also gave rise to a complex and inscrutable network of commercial relationships, over all of which he presided. The years from 1910 till 1912 saw much development and construction at the "Motorflugplatz Johannisthal-Adlershof" which also had their impact in the surrounding districts of Berlin.

=== Luft-Verkehrs-Gesellschaft AG ===
In 1911 all; three of the airships built by the company "Luftfahrt Betriebs Gesellschaft mbh ab" crashed, bringing the company to ruin. Spotting an opportunity, Müller now teamed up with the Deutsche Kolonialbank and on 21 February 1912 launched his own aircraft manufacturing company, Luftverkehrsgesellschaft m.b.H. (LVG), with operations based at the Johannisthal Air Field. The venture was initially loss making, but in 1913 he was able to secure a contract to supply aircraft to the Imperial Army, and during the First World War LVG produced 5,640 aircraft, emerging as Germany's number two aircraft manufacture, second only to the mighty Albatros Flugzeugwerke.

=== Troubles ===
The airfield was a success. Many of his admirers assert that it was only as a result of support and careful financial planning by Müller that on several occasion financial disaster was averted. But the rapid expansion of his business interests between 1910 and 1914 had its price. Several former business partners and rivals emerged: Müller found himself entangled in a number legal disputes which spilled into (and beyond) the newspapers. He was accused of having used the "Tagafia" company as a device for the fraudulent expropriation of land in Johannisthal. The most high-profile case involved his former friend and business partner, the lawyer and regional government law officer August Eschenbach who had come to the rescue in 1909 during a cashflow crisis, with a substantial investment in Müller's building construction company, "Land und Industriebauten". In 1911 Eschenbach asked to have his investment returned. Müller's financial commitments to subsequent projects meant that in the short term he was in no position to comply with the request. At the end of 1911 Eschenbach launched legal proceedings, demanding repayment in full of the money he had paid for the shares back in 1909. (The price paid had been 150% of the original issue price for the shares.) In order to press the matter more effectively, Eschenbach joined with fellow flying club member Otto Wiener (who was also a senior director with Albatros Flugzeugwerke) and with various other members of the aviation establishment, to make very public the defamatory accusation that Arthur Müller had founded his own aircraft manufacturing company, LVG, only as a device for extracting investment capital from the fledgling aviation industry. The legal case was quickly concluded: Müller won and Eschenbach lost. However, several newspapers and magazines were persuaded to publish hostile articles. Under the headline "The Swamp" the banker-journalist Ludwig Lenn-Eschwege produced a meticulously detailed piece about the founding and financing of the "Tagafia" company and of the Johannisthal Air Field which was deeply critical of Arthur Müller's supposed motives, and was reprinted by the respected specialist journal "Die Bank". The media storm, which became increasingly toxic, peaked with a piece by Eschenbach's associate, Albert Greeven entitled "Moderne Gründungen" (loosely, "Modern start-ups") that appeared in May 1913, incorporating powerfully antisemitic undertones. The image of Arthur Müller as "a [Jewish] speculator" pursued him for the rest of his life and indeed, possibly, at least in part, because he died two years after the coming to power of the committed antisemite Adolf Hitler, haunted and damaged his widow and his sons for many years after he was himself no longer on the scene.

At least one of the hostile articles was also picked up by Vladimir Ilyich Ulyanov, an exiled Russian revolutionary living, at the time, alternately in Paris and London. A lengthy essay entitled (in English) "Imperialism, the Highest Stage of Capitalism" was published in 1917. In it Lenin, as he subsequently became known, included the so-called "Tagafia scandal" as a case study in the iniquities of capitalism, making reference to the "spectacular deceit" (... "tollen Betrug") which Müller had allegedly organised. Several commentators, seeking to understand and rehabilitate the reputation that pursued Müller during and beyond his later decades, assert that Lenin's portrayal of Müller as an archetypal demon of capitalism would later resonate powerfully with the leadership in the German Democratic Republic. Eventually Müller was moved to respond with a systematic rebuttal which was published in 1913 under the title "Thersites, nicht Gracchus. Entgegnungen auf die Broschüre des Herrn Albert Greeven. Nebst dem Abdruck der Broschüre von Albert Greeven" ("Thersites, not Gracchus. Rebuttal of the 'manifesto' of Mr Albert Greeven, alongside the printing of the 'manifesto' of Mr Albert Greeven."). Müller used his own 23 page publication to analyse the motives of his clamorous adversaries. By the time this rebuttal appeared Müller had resigned from the boards of "Tagafia" and of the air field company, which were the two entities drawing the most voluminous of the media criticism. He successfully pursued a number of further defamation cases against journalists, but the legal processes involved were often cumbersome and slow.

=== War ===
War broke out in July 1914. Control of the airfield was assumed by The Army. The army commander, Captain Alfred Hildebrandt, proved to be no friend to von Tschudi, nor to Müller. Sources are silent about Müller's attitude to the war, but it is known that production at his LVG aircraft factory on the airfield climbed steeply. It would be hard to believe that Müller's business interests did not profit significantly from his involvement in supplying the military. In October 1918 a new company, "Luftverkehrs-Gesellschaft Kommandit-Gesellschaft Arthur Müller" was registered, presumably in anticipation of a post-war aerospace boom.

The next month it became apparent the Germany had lost the war, and the "negotiations" that produced the Treaty of Versailles in June 1919 put an abrupt end to thoughts of an aerospace boom. Germany was permitted to retain 149 civilian aircraft, and the conditions imposed by the victorious powers included a complete ban on aircraft production. There were some aircraft entrepreneurs and workers who quietly switched their attention to gliders while others wondered if a more promising industrial future for Germany might lie in automobile production.

=== Modern housing and other manufacturing activities in the German Republic ===
With the emperor gone and the aerospace sector hobbled, it was time for new beginnings. At the end of the war Müller invested heavily in new sectors, as halls intended for balloon storage were hastily redeployed. The focus of "Arthur Müller Bauten- und Industriewerke" (AMBI), his new venture, was initially on pioneering building materials, based on innovative combinations of basic and readily available ingredients such as cement, sand, plaster, clay and coke ash. There were AMBI-bricks, AMBI-slabs, AMBI-roof tiles and AMBI-facings. Patents for the new materials were obtained, along with the necessary approvals from the building inspectorates. Müller also entered the homes construction business himself, concentrating on modern well-insulated multi-storey residential blocks. A noteworthy development on the northern edge of the airfield site included multi-occupancy blocks and detached houses, all constructed according to the AMBI-method. Several AMBI housing developments survive (2020) in the Berlin area, for instance along the Sterndamm in Treptow-Köpenick. The AMBI group business expanded through the 1920s. Most of the manufacturing continued to be produced in the Berlin area, but reflecting the weight of some of the products involved and the associated transport costs and challenges, there were also factories in Breisach, Kassel, Köslin, Merseburg and Neuruppin. In the end there were also branch offices in the larger population centres such as Breslau, Essen, Frankfurt, Hamburg, Hanover, Cologne, Königsberg, Leipzig, Mühlhausen, Munich and Nuremberg. Along with construction and the manufacture of building materials, the group was also engaged in producing agricultural and domestic engineering machinery, sawmills and the timber trade, iron foundry work, electricity generation, aircraft construction and flight training, railway equipment, land development and industrial research.

=== Steel car bodies ===
According to one (uncorroborated) source, in 1923, two years after celebrating his fiftieth birthday, Arthur Müller undertook a trip to the United States of America, accompanied by his sons Max and Ludwig, which lasted three years. More unambiguously evidenced is the agreement, mediated by the Henry Schröder Banking Corporation, that Müller concluded on behalf of his "Arthur Müller Bauten- und Industriewerke GmbH" with the Edward G. Budd Manufacturing Company of Philadelphia on 12 February 1926. The focus of the agreement was on all-steel car bodies, based on manufacturing techniques pioneered and developed by Edward G. Budd 1870 - 1946, which drove a complete reconfiguration of the Automotive industry in the United States during the 1920s and 1930s. The 1926 agreement between Müller and Budd was the necessary precursor to a corresponding reconfiguration of the Automotive sectors in Germany, France and England during the 1930s and 1940s. The new project was to be operated through "AMBI-Budd Presswerk GmbH", yet another company established on the land of the former Johannisthal-Adlershof airfield by Arthur Müller. The actual site selected was the Rumpler-Werke factory, built during the First World War to produce military aircraft. After 1918 Rumpler had attempted to reinvent itself as an automobile manufacturer, but eight years later it succumbed to economic pressures: the company liquidation early in 1926 had left the factory looking for a new owner. AMBI-Budd Presswerk GmbH was to be a joint venture project, with 49% of the start-up capital subscribed by Budd and 51% coming from Müller. Budd's share was financed not by cash but by revenues receivable under an associated licensing agreement. Funding for the project accordingly came from Arthur Müller.

Traditional car bodies, following the longstanding practices of the carriage trade, took their structural strength and rigidity from a timber frame. This was then coated with metal or fabric panels. The AMBI-Budd approach did away with the timber frame. Instead the car body was made up of a number of large steel panels, welded together to form a single rigid structure. A steel chassis, which bore much of the structural load, was at this stage retained. The AMBI-Budd all-steel car bodies were both stronger and lighter, which meant that manufacturers could choose to make their cars faster or to make the engines less powerful and thereby cheaper. The most critical difference involved production technologies. A new car model produced with an AMBI-Budd all-steel body needed a large amount of upfront initial investment in heavy presses and carefully crafted dies to form the ever more complex shapes for the body panels. Once that investment had been incurred, however, the production cost of an individual car body was far lower than with the traditional timber-frame body. Large auto-makers able to raise the capital to invest in the panel pressings could then undercut more traditional manufacturers and so out-compete smaller producers while amortising their initial investment costs over relatively large volumes. During the 1930s in Germany and France several middle tier auto-makers sought to reduce production cost by sharing a single design for car bodies. That included, in Germany, several automakers who purchased their car bodies from AMBI-Budd. One of the first customers was BMW for their BMW Dixi. For the early cars the steel body was attached to the chassis at a production facility that BMW had set up next to the AMBI-Budd factory on the former airfield site. BMW proved a somewhat fickle customer, playing the market between a number of different traditional and innovative car body producers during the 1930s, but the Dixi was not the only BMW model to be offered with an all-steel body from AMBI-Budd. Over that decade, most of the major German automakers worked with "AMBI-Budd Presswerk GmbH". The largest customer, in volume terms, was Adler, a mid-market hitherto conservative manufacturer, keen to expand in order to compete more directly with market-leaders Opel and DKW by including smaller cars in its range. In terms of unit volumes, during the 1930s Adler jostled for third place in the sales charts with Daimler-Benz. It was, indeed, characteristic of Müller's business approach that in 1927 he purchased a shareholding of approximately 27% in the Adler business, giving rise to a curiously symbiotic relationship which was also reflected in respect of product development, over which the two businesses worked closely together.

=== Death and burial ===
In 1934 Arthur Müller suffered a workplace accident at one of his properties in the Johannisthal industrial zone. He was already badly afflicted with Diabetes, and following the accident one of his legs had to be amputated. Aware that he was dying, Arthur and Thekla Müller sat down and in December 1934 wrote their joint will. Although they took great care over the details of the drafting, the terms were at heart simple and unsurprising. Their assets were to pass to their sons, Max and Ludwig. 37 days later, on 19 January 1935 Arthur Müller died from his illness and from the after effects of the accident. His son Max, who had recently lost his first wife to cancer, emigrated to London later that year. The couple's other son, Ludwig, who had still been living with his parents at the time of his father's death, emigrated to New York City in 1937.

His body was cremated at Wilmersdorf crematorium and then, two days later on 25 January 1935, buried in the Müller family plot at the interdenominational Heerstraße Cemetery. Arthur Müller had acquired plot reference 5-C-2 in 1927, and by 1935 it already contained the remains of one of his brothers, Hermann Nathan, and of Elisabeth (Aschkenasy) Müller, his daughter-in-law: she had died tragically young in August 1934. However, in 1987, following the expiry of the subsequently mandated standard sixty-year term and in the absence of further interest from family members, the plot was "dissolved", ready for reassignment. Arthur Müller's own ashes by that time had been absent for nearly half a century, having been removed by his widow in May 1941 for reburial in New York.

=== Thekla's widowhood ===
The Hitler government took power in January 1933 and lost no time in transforming Germany into a one-party dictatorship. Antisemitism was no longer a mere slogan: it was a core underpinning of government strategy. Nevertheless, at the time when Arthur Müller died in January 1935 there were still many in Germany convinced that the National Socialist dictatorship was a nightmare that would quickly pass. It was not to be: the savagery intensified, progressively rather than suddenly, over the next decade. Many Ambi-Budd employees followed the procession carrying Müller's ashes to the cemetery in January 1935. The family received many letters of condolence from Müller's former business partners and contacts, some from the early days of the Johannisthal venture, and including some from government backers or from people whom the National Socialists would later celebrate as war heroes. Modern commentators raise the question of just how many of those people would have dared (or wished) to be so open in their displays of grief over Müller's death if he had died not in 1935 but in 1938, after there had been a further three years for the relentless racist government propaganda to infiltrate the minds of the citizens.

For Müller's widow, after 1935 conditions in Berlin became progressively worse. By the time her sons emigrated in 1935 and 1937, relations between the two men had broken down completely: they no longer spoke together. They had both cut off all links with the Jewish community, respectively in 1929 (Max) and 1930 (Ludwig), which may have made it less problematic for them to flee the country when they did. For Thekla it seemed there was no question of leaving Germany. The endless legal and human complexities involving her links with her late husband's businesses and, indeed, the foreign shareholders would have made emigration unthinkable. After the 1938 November pogrom (identified in many English-language sources as "Kristallnacht") the unthinkable had to become thinkable, however. The destructive attacks on Jewish property in Berlin lasted for two days and left approximately 400 Jewish Berliners dead. The arrests and deportations of 26,000 followed immediately afterwards. Jewish Germans whose businesses had been destroyed were required to pay to restore the damage, while their insurance policies were confiscated. Pressure to emigrate increased at the same time as the emigration option became ever more costly and for many individuals impossible, thanks to a succession of arbitrary "exit taxes" and bureaucratic hurdles. Forced aryanization of the Müller business empire began in 1938. Early in 1939 Thekla Müller was forced to leave the comfortable home in Berlin-Charlottenburg in which she had lived with her family since 1916. In August 1939 the new owner, a government Gauleiter, moved in. Between April 1939 and June 1941 Thekla lived in a room at the Hotel Esplanade in the city centre.

After 1939 Thekla Müller hired a lawyer and became serious about the need to escape from Hitler's Germany. It was not until all the various Müller enterprises had been aryanized or closed down, and after payment of her "National flight tax" ("Reichsfluchtsteuer") that on 10 June 1941 she was allowed to leave Germany, however. The previous month she had arranged for the disinterment of her husband's ashes from the grave plot at Heerstraße, and these she took with her to New York City. From the circumstances in which she lived out the final years of her life, it would appear that she was able to take very little else. Arthur's ashes were reburied at the Linden Hill Cemetery in Queens.

=== After 1945 ===
War ended in May 1945 with Berlin reduced to rubble and the western two thirds of Germany divided into military occupation zones. Most of the Müller assets expropriated b the previous government had been physically located in what was now being administered as the Soviet occupation zone - relaunched in October 1949 as the Soviet sponsored German Democratic Republic. For the heirs of a Jewish capitalist who had been pilloried in the writings of Lenin back in 1916 there could be little prospect of restitution from that quarter. The prospects were better in respect of the relatively small number of family assets that had been physically located in the western half of Berlin or in other parts of Germany now under British, US or French administration. In 1945 Hellmuth Jacob, whose wife Elisabeth was one of the sisters of Arthur Müller, was appointed in West Berlin as a "carer in absentio" ("Abwesenheitspfleger"), authorised to look after Thekla Müller's interest while she was living abroad. (It is not clear how Hellmuth Jacob, who was also Jewish, had managed quietly to live "illegally" in Berlin, and to survive throughout the twelve Nazi years.) After more than a decade of legal wrangling, in 1956 the government of West Germany provided some restitution in respect of "west" German family assets forcibly taken by the Hitler government. By that time Thekla Müller was dead. There was never any corresponding restitution in respect of the far larger quantity of assets taken by the government in what had become East Germany.

== Reputation ==
After Arthur Müller died, the "bosses and staff" ("Führer und Gefolgschaft") from AMBI-Werke published a death announcement in which they paid tribute to Müller's outstanding personal merits. That was no small matter, given the power of the prevailing state-mandated racism of the time.

Otherwise, if only because he was for many years a high-profile member of the Jewish community, reports of his death were for a long time suppressed during the National Socialist period. Between 1945 and 1990, the German Democratic Republic, where the media were encouraged to follow the government line, Arthur Müller was mentioned, if at all, only dismissively, as a property speculator. The damning seeds sown in Lenin's essay Imperialism, the Highest Stage of Capitalism had fallen on fertile ground here. It was only after reunification that awareness of Müller's contributions to aerospace and industrial production technology began to enter into mainstream scholarship. Since 2002 a street in a new residential development on the south-west of the former airfield site has been named after him.
