= Achtung! – Auto-Diebe! =

1930 film directed by Harry Piel

Achtung! Auto-Diebe!
- Directed by: Harry Piel
- Written by: Hans Rameau
- Produced by: Bruno Duday
- Starring: Harry Piel
- Cinematography: Ewald Daub
- Distributed by: Ariel-Film
- Release date: 5 June 1930
- Running time: 101 minutes
- Country: Germany
- Language: German

Achtung! Auto-Diebe! (English: Warning! Car thieves!) is a 1930 German crime film directed by Harry Piel and written by Hans Rameau. The film starred Harry Piel and Leopold von Ledebur.

== Cast ==
- Harry Piel as Harry Palen, Auto-Verkäufer

and in alphabetical order

- Charly Berger
- Hugo Fischer-Köppe as Franz, Chauffeur
- Charles Francois
- Max Gülstorff as Jakob Reuß, Inhaber einer Auto-Firma
- Dary Holm as Helene, seine Gattin
- Herbert Paulmüller
- Lydia Potechina
- Oswald Scheffel
- Raimondo Van Riel as Robert Radek
- Leopold von Ledebur as Eggert, Kriminalkommissär

== Release ==
The film premiered on 5 June 1930 in Berlin.
